= List of Odia films of 2019 =

The tables list the Ollywood films in Odia released in theaters in the year 2019. Premiere shows and film festival screenings are not considered as releases for this list. A list of films produced by the Ollywood film industry and released and scheduled to be released in theaters in 2019.

== Released films ==
=== January – April ===
Release		Title	Director	Cast	Note	Ref.
J A N U A R Y	4	Bapa Tame Bhari Dusto	T. Ganesh	Pradyumna Lenka, Jayjeet Das, Samita		
J A N U A R Y	4	Dil Tate Deichi	Sanjay Nayak	Mihir Das, Biju Bajajena, Harihara Mohapatra		
J A N U A R Y	4	Ei Dil Tate Deli	Nilu Baksh	Riyana Shukla, Bibhas		
J A N U A R Y	11	Ajab Sanju Ra Gajab Love	Ashok Pati	Babushaan Mohanty, Archita Sahu, Udit Guru, Ashok Pati, Kunal Pattnaik, Mihir Das		
J A N U A R Y	11	Chal Tike Dusta Heba	Tapas Sarghariya	Mahima, Sayal, Rishan, Mihir Das, Pradyumna Lenka, Aiswarya Behera, Tribhuban Panda, Priyanka Mahapatra, Asit Pati		
J A N U A R Y	25	Tu Mo Suna Chadhei	Dilip Panda	Jyoti Ranjan, Sreya		
J A N U A R Y	25	Nimki	Susant Mani	Varsha Priyadarshini		
J A N U A R Y	F E B R U A R Y	8	Prema Pain Mahabharata	Niranjan Behera	Drama	
J A N U A R Y	F E B R U A R Y	8	Premare Rakhichi 100 Ru 100	Sanjay Nayak	Jyoti Ranjan Nayak, Riya Dey, Gudu Sawan, Aiswarya Behera, Suchismita, Manoranjan 'Bulu' Mallick	
10	F E B R U A R Y	Twist Wala Love Story	Rasesh Mohanty	Subhasish, Jagjeet, Rajesh, Lipika Senapati, Puja, Niharika, Premanjan Parida		
15	F E B R U A R Y	Bobal Toka	Sudhakar Vasanth	Pintu Nanda, Pradeep Dutta, Madhu, Sudhakar Vasanth		
25	F E B R U A R Y	Rangila Bohu	Sritam Das	Debasis, Lipsa, Usashi Mishra, Pintu Nanda		
M A R C H	8	Champion	K. Murli Krishna	Archita Sahu, Manoj Mishra, Sanu, Prithviraj		
M A R C H	28	Biju Babu	Vishal Mourya & Devi Prasad Lenka	Anubhav Mohanty, Supriya Nayak		

Release	Title	Director	Cast	Producer	Ref.
April	Nayakara Na Debadaasa	Mrutyunjaya Sahoo	Bhoomika Dash, Anu Choudhury, Asit Patra		
April	Champion	K Murari Krushna	Archita Sahu		
May	Maala Mahu Jibana Maati	Ramesh Rout	Sabyasachi Mishra, Elina Samantray, Swapna Pati		
June	Golmaal Love	Ashok Pati	Babushaan Mohanty, Tamanna Vyas, Bijay Mohanty, Sritam Das		
June	Tu Mo Love Story 2	Tapas Sargharia	Swaraj Barik, Bhoomika Dash, Sidhant Mohapatra, Anu Choudhury		
September	Tu Kahide I Love You	Satyabrata Nayak	Rakesh Deo, Divyadisha Mohanty, Sanmanita, Mihir Das, Pritiraj Satapathy, Santosh Nayak, Salil Mitra, Jeeban Panda, Pragyan, Bhakti]], Namrata Das	Bikram Mohapatra & Prabhat Mohapatra	
October	Mr. Majnu	Ashok Pati	Babushaan Mohanty, Sheetal Patra, Suryamayee, Divya, Mihir Das, Raimohan parida		
October	This Is Maya Re Baya	Susant Mani	Swaraj Barik, Elina Samantray, Sidhant Mohapatra, Jhilik Bhattacharjee|	Sitaram Agarwal, Siddharth TV	
November	Baala - The Rhythm Of Life	Amaresh Pati	Sameer Satpathy, Divyadisha Mohanty, Ananya Mishra, Ananta Mishra, Anmol Pati, Aiswarya Behera, Aparajita Mohanty	Akash Raj Karmakar, Tarang Cine Productions	
