= Humane Sagar =

Indian playback singer (1990–2025)

- Born: 25 November 1990; Titlagarh, Balangir, Odisha, India
- Died: 17 November 2025 (aged 34) Bhubaneswar, Odisha, India
- Genres: Indian pop, soul, classic
- Occupation: Playback singer
- Years active: 2012–2025
- Labels: Mahak Music; Aarman Music; Sarthak Music; Tarang Music; Venus
- Spouse: Shriya Mishra

Humane Sagar (25 November 1990 – 17 November 2025) was an Indian playback singer who worked mostly in Ollywood Industry. He won the second season of reality singing competition Voice of Odisha in 2012.

== Early life ==
Sagar's family had a musical background. His father and mother were singers, and his grandfather was a composer for private albums. He competed in a reality television show called "Voice of Odisha" on Tarang TV in 2012 and won the show.

== Career ==
Sagar got his break through Tarang Cine Productions in the feature film Ishq Tu Hi Tu where he sang the title track composed by Abhijit Majumdar which became a hit. After that he sang thousands of Odia movie songs. He also made a Hindi Album Mera Yeh Jahan. He worked on various Odia music albums like Tuma Otha Tale, Niswasa, Bekhudee, and Chehera in 2017.

== Political career ==
Sagar joined politics for Biju Janata Dal (BJD), a political party of the Indian state of Odisha on 3 March 2019.

== Personal life and death ==
Sagar was born in Titlagarh from a musical family. His father Ravi Chandra Sagar was a singer and musician while mother Sefali Suna was also a singer and teacher. Sagar married Shriya Mishra in 2017, his fellow participant in the show Voice of Odisha Season 2. They have a daughter.

Humane died of pneumonia and multiple organ failure at All India Institutes of Medical Sciences, in Bhubaneswar, Odisha, India on 17 November 2025, at the age of 34.

== Discography ==
=== Album ===
Year	Album	Track	Co-artist	Composer(s)	Language
2017	Mera Yeh desh	"Title Track"	Sonam Dash	Sudeep Jena	Hindi
2017	Niswasa	"Niswasa To Bina Mora Chalena"	Namita Agrawal	Baidyanath Dash	Odia
2017	Bekhudee	"Bhasijiba Khushi Tora"		Sushil Dalai	Odia
2017	Chehera	"To Premare Pagala Mu Aji"		Prem Anand	Odia
2017	Tuma Otha Tale	"Title Track"	Tapu Mishra	Baidyanath Dash	Odia

=== Singles ===
Year	Track	Composer(s)	Language
2017	"E Mana Mo Mana"	Japani	Odia
2018	"To Manare Thila Jadi Au Lo Kehi"	Manas Kumar	Odia
2018	"Kemiti Bhulibi Se Abhula Dina (Hrudaya Hina)"	Manas Kumar & OdiaNews24 Team	Odia
2020	"To Ghara Age Karibi Mu Dhamaka"		Odia

=== As playback singer ===
( Humane Sagar all odia film songs playlist - Click HERE )

Year	Film	Sl.	Song	Co-artist	Composer(s)
2014	Something something 2	1	"Prema Hei Jae Re"		Prem Anand
2014	Mental	2	"Baby Tu Sanjibani"		Prem Anand
2015	Ishq Tu Hi Tu'	3	"Ishq Tu Hi Tu (Title Track)"	Tapu Mishra	Abhijit Majumdar
2015	Ishq Tu Hi Tu'	4	"Ishq Phulara"	Tapu Mishra	Abhijit Majumdar
2015	Ishq Tu Hi Tu'	5	"Ishq Tu Hi Tu (Sad Version)"	Tapu Mishra	Abhijit Majumdar
2015	Rockstar	6	"Rockstar (Title Track)"		Chandrakant Sutar
2015	Love You Hamesha	7	"Chaati Tale Rahi Galu"	Ira Mohanty	Prem Anand
2015	Gapa Hele Bi Sata	8	"Tate Gaaidele Tu Gita Hei jau"		Prem Anand
2015	Gapa Hele Bi Sata	9	"Gote Sua Gote Sari"	Sohini Mishra	Prem Anand
2015	Gapa Hele Bi Sata	10	"Hae Re Mita"		Prem Anand
2015	Pilata Bigidigala	11	"Nisha Nisha"	Sohini Mishra	Prem Anand
2015	Aashiq	12	"Tate Mu Kahin Ete Bhala Pae Janena"	Aseema Panda	Abhijit Majumdar
2015	Kalki	13	"Mo Manare Chanchala Tu"	Tapu Mishra	Bibhuti Bhusan Gadnayak
2016	Gote Sua Gote Sari	14	"Na Re Na Re "		Prem Anand
2016	Hela Mate Prema Jara	15	"Hrudayara Dhadkan"	Ira Mohanty	Prem Anand
2016	Chup Chup Chori Chori	16	"Bhala Pae Boli"		Manmath Mishra
2016	Jabardast Premika	17	"Mana Khali Tate Chahe"		Abhijit Majumdar
2016	Agastya'	18	"Agastya (Title Track)"	Sricharana Mohanty Satyajeet Pradhan Sangram Mohanty Bishnu Mohan Kabi Ashutosh Mohanty Tarikh Aziz	Prem Anand
2016	Agastya'	19	"Dhire Dhire Bhala Pai Gali"	Ananya Nanda	Prem Anand
2016	Agastya'	20	"Rama Rama E Jhia Ta"	Pragnya Patra Aryan Das Asutosh Mohanty	Prem Anand
2016	Jhiata Bigidigala	21	"Malka Malka"	Prangya Hota	Prem Anand
2016	Jhiata Bigidigala	22	"Smart City Jhia"		Prem Anand
2016	Bhaina Kana Kala Se	23	"Luha Aei Luha"		Prem Anand
2016	Bhaina Kana Kala Se	24	"Tu Mora Life Re Asila Pare"	Sohini Mishra	Prem Anand
2016	Baby'	25	"Baby Title Song"	Chunmoon	Prem Anand
2016	Baby'	26	"Sun Zara"	Ananya Nanda	Prem Anand
2016	Baby'	27	"Na Re Na"		Prem Anand
2016	Baby'	28	"Baby Title Song (Sad)"		Prem Anand
2016	Love Pain Kuch Bhi Karega	29	"Shehzadi"		Abhijit Majumdar
2016	Tora Dine Ku Mora Dine	30	"To Niriha Niriha Akhire"	Nibedita	Malaya Mishra
2016	Premara Nisha Niara Niara	31	"Mo Nidara Tu Sapana"	Aseema Panda	Saumitri Palai Shailendra
2017	Nijhum Ratira Sathi	32	"Alo Lo Lo Lo Lo"	Ira Mohanty	Malay Mishra
2017	Nijhum Ratira Sathi	33	"Jebe Ichha Dekhi Paru"	Ira Mohanty	Malay Mishra
2017	Nijhum Ratira Sathi	34	"Kete Bhala Paye"		Malay Mishra
2017	Tamaku Dekhila Pare	35	"Aa Kahile Janha Phere"	Ira Mohanty	Malaya Mishra
2017	Dil Diwana Heigala	36	"Dil Diwana Heigala (Title Song)"	Nibedita	A. S. Kumar
2017	Dil Ka Raja	37	"Aa Re Arey Arey"	Tapu Mishra	Baidyanath Das
2017	Dil Ka Raja	38	"Mo Bhala Paibara Rutu Re (Ae Banara Chhai)"	Antara Chakraborty	Baidyanath Das
2017	Katha Deli Matha Chhuin	39	"Emiti Ae Samaya"		Prem Anand
2017	Katha Deli Matha Chhuin	40	"Pabana Juade Jaau"	Diptirekha	Prem Anand
2017	Katha Deli Matha Chhuin	41	"Tame Baha Heicha"		Prem Anand
2017	The End	42	"Tu Mo Manra Mita"		S. Chandrakant
2017	Sita Rama nka Bahaghara Kali Jugare	43	"Chumma Fotaka"	Sanju Mohanty	Kishan Kavadiya
2017	Sita Rama nka Bahaghara Kali Jugare	44	"Kahiki Manepadu Ete"		Kishan Kavadiya
2017	Tu Mo Love Story	45	"Jadi Ae Jibanare"	Ananya Nanda	Prem Anand
2017	Tu Mo Love Story	46	"Tu Mo Love Story (Title Song)"	Ananya Nanda	Prem Anand
2017	Tu Mo Love Story	47	"Tike Tike Achinha Tu"	Diptirekha Padhi	Prem Anand
2017	Tike Khara Tike Chhai	48	"Ei Mo Akhire"	Jasaswini Nayak	Biswaswarup
2017	Mitha Mitha	49	"License De"	Ira Mohanty	Malaya Mishra
2017	Mitha Mitha	50	"Prathama Prathama"	Ira Mohanty	Malaya Mishra
2017	Abhaya'	51	"Priya Mo Priya (Tote Mu Jhuruchi)"	Lopamudra	Prem Anand
2017	Abhaya'	52	"Rabba Rabba"	Ananya Nanda	Prem Anand
2017	Abhaya'	53	"Gajal Gajal"	Diptirekha Padhi	Prem Anand
2017	Abhaya'	54	"Abhaya (Title song)"		Prem Anand
2017	Romeo Juliet	55	"Tu Kahibu Ta"	Ananya Nanda	Prem Anand
2017	Romeo Juliet	56	"To Sathire Gaputhile"	Ananya Nanda	Prem Anand
2017	Love Formula	57	"Khaali To Baate"	Nicky	Prem Darshan
2017	Just Mohabbat	58	"Priya Basanti"	Tapu Mishra	Abhijit Majumdar
2017	Mu Khanti Odia Jhia'	59	"Dil Janiye"	Tapu Mishra	Baidyanath Dash
2017	Emiti Bi Heipare	60	"Pagala Na Mu Deewana (Ranjhana Ranjhana)"	Anjali Dutta	Baidyanath Das
2017	Hero No. 1	61	"DJ Wala Dance"	Antara Chakrabarty	Abhijit Majumdar
2017	Shiva - Not Out	62	"Prema Re Jane"	Lopamudra	Prem Anand
2017	Kabula Barabula'	63	"Zalima O Zalima"	Ananya Nanda	Prem Anand
2017	Tu Mo Hero	64	"Tu mo Hero(Tiltle)"	Aseema Panda	Baidyanath Dash
2017	Tu Mo Hero	65	"Aashiqana"	Ananya Nanda	Baidyanath Dash
2017	Tu Mo Hero	66	"Ye Ki Prema"		Baidyanath Dash
2017	Bajrangi	67	"Dhima DHima Aakhi"	Diptirekha Padhi	Prem Anand
2017	Bajrangi	68	"Mo Life Re Tu"	Diptirekha Padhi	Prem Anand
2017	Bajrangi	69	"Chinha Chinha Aakhi Re"	Ananya Nanda	Prem Anand
2017	To Premare Padila Pare	70	"Dil Kahuchi Aaji (Come On Baby)"	Tapu Mishra	Baidyanath Dash
2017	To Premare Padila Pare	71	"To Premare Padila Pare (Title)"	Tapu Mishra	Baidyanath Dash
2017	Tike Anadi Pura Khiladi	72	"Phula Ra Barasa To Pain"		Agniraj Kishore
2017	Laila O Laila	73	"First Time Gote Jhia"	Nibedita	Baidyanath Dash
2017	Laila O Laila	74	Aadhaar Card Re Sukuti Sahu		Baidyanath Dash
2017	Laila O Laila	75	Laila O Laila (Title)	Aseema Panda	Baidyanath Dash
2017	Laila O Laila	76	Ye Ki Pagalami		Baidyanath Dash
2018	Only Pyar	77	"Silly Silly Only Pyar (Title)"	Pragnya Hota	Abhijit Majumdar
2018	Only Pyar	78	"Aaste Aaste"	Diptirekha Padhi	Abhijit Majumdar
2018	Happy Lucky	79	"Prema Tora Badmas"	Diptirekha Padhi	Prem Anand
2018	Manara Manasi	80	"Manara Manasi (Title)"	Antara Chakraborty	Sushil Dalai
2018	Dipu - The Dance Boy	81	"Prema Pruthibi Re"		Prem Anand
2018	Dipu - The Dance Boy	82	"Lovely Lovely"	Sohini Mishra	Prem Anand
2018	Ajatashatru	83	"Ore Priya Mo Priya Re"		Biswa Bhusan Mohapatra
2018	Deewana Heli To Pain	84	"Tuku Musi"	Pamela Jain	Abhijit Majumdar
2018	Jogi	85	"Dhuan Dhuan"		Deepak Kumar
2018	Shakti - The Lion Heart	86	"Hata Dhari Mora Chali Sikheila"		Abhijit Majumdar
2018	Love Promise	87	"Hai Mora Heartbeat - Tik Tik"	Diptirekha Padhi	Prem Anand
2018	Love Promise	88	"Love Promise (Title)"	Ananya Nanda	Prem Anand
2018	Sundergarh Ra Salman Khan	89	"Pyar wala Hichki"		Abhijit Majumdar
2018	4 Idiots	90	"Aji Tharu"	Diptirekha Padhi	Prem Anand
2018	4 Idiots	91	"Aji Tharu (Sad Version)"	Diptirekha Padhi	Prem Anand
2018	Tokata Fasigala	92	"Janu Superstar (Honey Honey)"	Nibedita	Baidyanath Dash
2018	Tokata Fasigala	93	"Tokata Fasigala Title (Single Wife)"	Sourin Bhatt	Baidyanath Dash
2018	Excuse Me	94	"Kemiti Kemiti"		Sarat Nayak
2018	Local Toka Love Chokha	95	"Local Toka Love Chokha (Title)"		Baidyanath Das
2018	Local Toka Love Chokha	96	"Deidele Sarijibaki"		Baidyanath Das
2018	Blackmail	97	"Bhabiba Agaru"	Ananya Nanda	Prem Anand
2018	Ishq Puni Thare	98	"Dhire Dhire"	Diptirekha Padhi	Prem Anand
2018	Ishq Puni Thare	99	"Mora Hosa Nahi"	Diptirekha Padhi	Prem Anand
2018	Bhaijaan	100	"Deli Re Deli Tate A Mana"	Ananya Nanda	Baidyanath Dash
2018	Bhaijaan	101	"Sarmili Manchali Chanchali"	Diptirekha Padhi	Baidyanath Dash
2018	Premi Diwana	102	"Chahun Chahun"	Antara Chakraborty	Sarat Chandra Bardhan
2018	Mana Khali Tate Chanhe	103	"Mana Khali Tate Chanhe"	Pragnya Hota	Abhijit Majumdar
2018	Sriman Surdas	104	"Chipudi Delu DIl Ta"		Abhijit Majumdar
2018	Prem Kumar: Salesman of the Year	105	"Sunjaara Sunjaara"	Ananya Nanda	Prem Anand
2018	Prem Kumar: Salesman of the Year	106	"To Sathire Jebe Dekhahue"	Ananya Nanda	Prem Anand
2018	Pyar Alaga Prakar	107	"Pyaar Alga Prakar (Title)"	Aseema Panda	Amarendra Mohanty
2018	Pyar Alaga Prakar	108	"Bhala Paithili"	Ananya Nanda	Amarendra Mohanty
2018	Pyar Alaga Prakar	109	"Papuli Re Mora"	Diptirekha Padhi	Amarendra Mohanty
2018	Sathi Tu Pheria	110	"Jibana"		Prem Anand
2018	Love Express	111	"Goal Keeper Thile Kan Goal Hueni"	Aseema Panda	Baidyanath Das
2018	Love Express	112	"Gadilare Love Express"	Nibedita	Baidyanath Das
2018	Love Express	113	"Awara Dil Mo Kahe"	Nibedita	Baidyanath Das
2019	Chal Tike Dushta Heba	114	"Sun Saheba Sun"	Diptirekha Padhi	Bibhuti Bhusan Gadanayak
2019	Ajab Sanjura Gajab Love	115	"Aa Lagei De Daga"	Diptirekha Padhi	Prem Anand
2019	Ajab Sanjura Gajab Love	116	"Jhia Mane Sabu Pabana"		Prem Anand
2019	Nimki - Neempur Ru Naveen Nivas	117	"Ethi Sapanara Bhida"		Prem Anand
2019	Tu Mo Suna Chadhei	118	"Tu Mo Suna Chadhei (Title Song)"	Aseema Panda	Baidyanath Dash
2019	Tu Mo Suna Chadhei	119	"O Sathi"	Ananya Nanda	Baidyanath Dash
2019	Prema Pain Mahabharata	120	"Ishq Sufiana"	Jagruti Mishra	Abhijit Majumdar
2019	Premare Rakhichi 100 Ru 100	121	"Tadap Tadap Kari"		Malay Mishra
2019	Twist Wala Love Story	122	"Tori Niswasa"		Prem Anand
2019	Twist Wala Love Story	123	"Sabu Dekha Thu Alagaa"	Diptirekha Padhi	Prem Anand
2019	Rangeela Bohu	124	"Tate Tike Dekhibaku Bahana Khoje"		Debitosh Acharya
2019	Champion	125	"Heigala Ishq Re"	Pragyan Hota	Baidyanath Dash
2019	Biju Babu	126	"Hai Re Mu Galini Mari"	Diptirekha Padhi	Prem Anand
2019	Biju Babu	127	"Batabana Aaji Jauthi"	Ananya Nanda	Prem Anand
2019	Tu Mo Love Story 2	128	"To Dhadkan Ra Dhun Mo Chatire"	Ananya Nanda	Prem Anand
2019	Tu Mo Love Story 2	129	"Holi Re Prema Chhita"	Lopamudra Dash	Prem Anand
2019	Tu Mo Love Story 2	130	"Feel Karuchhi"	Diptirekha Padhi	Prem Anand
2019	Tu Mo Love Story 2	131	"Tike Tike Friendship"	Diptirekha Padhi	Prem Anand
2019	Golmal Love	132	"Surgical Strike"		Abhijit Majumdar
2019	To Bina Mun Kichi Chanhe Na	133	"To Bina Mu Kichhi Chanhe Na (Title)"	Diptirekha Padhi	Sudhansu Himansu
2019	Selfish Dil	134	"Prema Heigala"	Pragnya Hota	Saumitri Palai
2019	Selfish Dil	135	"Selfish Dil (Tite)"		Saumitri Palai
2019	Selfish Dil	136	"Darling Premare Falling"	Aseema Panda	Saumitri Palai
2019	Abhiman	137	"To Prema Mate Kala Badmash"	Nibedita	Bikash Das
2019	Prema Tora Naughty Naughty	138	"Aare Ajnabi"	Jagruti Mishra	Abhijit Majumdar
2019	Nayakara Na Devdas	139	"Toh Sathire"	Diptirekha Padhi	Baidyanath Das
2019	Nayakara Na Devdas	140	"Re Uparwala"		Baidyanath Das
2019	Tu Kahide I Love You	141	"Tu Kahide I Love You (Title)"	Amrita Nayak	Durga Nabs Saroj
2019	Tu Kahide I Love You	142	"Aei Mo Jibana Re"		Durga Nabs Saroj
2019	Chhabirani	143	"Tame Mora Dilrooba"	Diptirekha Padhi	Prem Anand
2019	Chhabirani	144	"Mitha Mitha Base Deha"	Lopamudra	Prem Anand
2019	Chhabirani	145	"Jali Jali Jae (Sad version)"		Prem Anand
2019	Jor Ka Jhatka	146	"Madhuri"		Abhijit Majumdar
2019	Dekha Hela Prema Hela	147	"Dekha Hela Prema Hela (Title)"	Diptirekha Padhi	S Chandrakant Sutar
2019	This Is Maya Re Baya	148	"Aaji Tharu Tu Mora"		Malaya Mishra
2019	This Is Maya Re Baya	149	"Tate Tike Chahin Dele"	Diptirekha Padhi	Malaya Mishra
2019	Baala	150	"Hai Hai Mo Dil"		Abhijit Majumdar
2019	From Me To You	151	"From Me To You (Title)"		Prem Anand
2019	From Me To You	152	"Kichhi Kichhi Hei Jaye"	Ananya Nanda	Prem Anand
2019	From Me To You	153	"I Wanna Die Darling"	Diptirekha Padhi	Prem Anand
2019	Mal Mahu Jiban Mati	154	"Malika Chal Jiba Chilika"	Sonali Nanda	Abhijit Majumdar
2019	Mal Mahu Jiban Mati	155	"Mal Mahu Jiban Mati"		Abhijit Majumdar
2020	Mu Paradesi Chadhei	156	"Mana Tu Pheri Aa"		Asad Nizam
2020	Mu Paradesi Chadhei	157	"Tofa Chandini re"	Aseema Panda	Asad Nizam
2020	Queen	158	"Queen (Title)"		Malaya Mishra
2020	Queen	159	"Sabu Sahi Jae"		Malaya Mishra
2020	Queen	160	"To Spandan Mo Spandan"	Ira Mohanty	Malaya Mishra
2020	Queen	161	"Tora Mora Love Story"	Ira Mohanty	Malaya Mishra
2020	Adrushyam	162	"Mun Nahi Aau Mun Hei"	Diptirekha Padhi	Biswaswarup
2020	Golmaal	163	"Golmaa (Title)"		Prem Anand
2020	Moosha Mora Rajanikant	164	"Premi Premi"	Aseema Panda	Prem Anand
2020	Tike Love Tike Twist	165	"Sayoni Sayoni"	Diptirekha Padhi	Prem Anand
2020	Tike Love Tike Twist	166	"Flower Flower"	Diptirekha Padhi	Prem Anand
2020	Love You Priya	167	"To Akhiru Luha Na Jharu"	Subhadra	Ashesh Das
2021	Paapa	168	"Jaha Pain"	Diptirekha Padhi	Prem Anand
2021	Romeo Raja	169	"To Let Board"		Baidyanath Dash
2021	Romeo Raja	170	"Mahire Mahi"	Gitishree Jena	Baidyanath Dash
2021	Srikhetra	171	"Dhima Dhima Pabana Re"	Antara Chakraborty	Goodly Rath
2021	Srikhetra	172	"Huye Ta Mana Chori"	Lipsa Mahapatra	Goodly Rath
2021	Tu Bhari Beautiful	173	"Tu Bhari Beautiful (Title)"	Ira Mohanty	Malaya Mishra
2021	Tu Bhari Beautiful	174	"Gote Janama Nuhen"	Ira Mohanty	Malaya Mishra
2021	Super Boy	175	"Ramani Mani Tu (Prema Gadi)"	Diptirekha Padhi	Baidyanath Dash
2021	Tandav	176	"O Janiya"		Agniraj Kishore
2021	Tandav	177	"Akhi Tumara"		Agniraj Kishore
2021	Chumki My Darling	178	"Chumki My Darling (Title)"	Antara Chakraborty	Abhijit Majumdar
2021	Tume Mo Sankha Tume Mo Sindura	179	"Tume Mo Sankha Tume Mo Sindura (Title)"	Rinki	Abhijit Majumdar
2021	Indrajala	180	"Cham Cham Payalia"		Abhijit Majumdar
2021	Ea Bi Gote Love Story	181	"Aama Chhota Chhota Dustami"	Amrita Nayak	Abhijit Majumdar
2021	Sahid Raghu Sardar	182	"To Bina"	Aseema Panda	Bikash Shukla
2021	Maa Ra Mamata	183	"Mu Megha Hei Na Jharile"	Ananya Nanda	Goodly Rath
2021	To Pain Feribi Basudha Chiri	184	"To Pain Feribi Basudha Chiri (Title Track)"	Ira Mohanty	Malaya Mishra
2021	To Pain Feribi Basudha Chiri	185	"Sahere Tapila Kanta"	Ira Mohanty	Malaya Mishra
2021	Paro Hates Devdas	186	"You Are My Right Choice Baby"	Lipsa Mohapatra	Baidyanath Dash
2021	Rangeela Bohu 2	187	"Jebe Jebe Bhabi Diye"	Lipsa Mohapatra	Goodly Rath
2021	Mane Mane Mana Khojuthila	188	"Mane Mane Mana Khojuthila (Title)"	Ananya Acharya	G. Ashok Kumar
2021	Mana Mo Neigalu Re	189	"Mana Mo Neigalu Re (Title)"	Jyotirmayee Nayak	Baidyanath Dash
2021	Chal Tike Prema Kariba	190	"O Jane Jaa (Title Track)"	Tapu Mishra	Bibhuti Bhusan Gadnayak
2021	Bijayinee Bijayi Bhava	191	"Bijayinee (Title Track)"	Diptirekha Padhi	Prem Anand
2021	Cuttack weds Sambalpur	192	"Ken Raiju Aaichu Tui Kaha (Pagal Premi)"		Baidyanath Dash Kamalesh Chakraborty
2021	Cuttack weds Sambalpur	193	"Tate Ete Bhala Paibi Mu"	Aseema Panda	Baidyanath Dash Kamalesh Chakraborty
2021	Ardhangini	194	"Mu Ardhangini"	Ira Mohanty	Goodly Rath
2021	Ardhangini	195	"Gote Khali Swapna Mora"	Lipsa Mahapatra	Goodly Rath
2021	Pal Pal Tate Chahen	196	"Pal Pal Tate Chahen (Title)"	Diptirekha Padhi	Abhijit Majumdar
2021	Pal Pal Tate Chahen	197	"Ore Meheruba"		Abhijit Majumdar
2021	Akhi Bujidele Tu	198	"Akhi Buji Dele Tu (Title)"	Antara Chakraborty	Abhijit Majumdar
2021	Herogiri	199	"Herogiri (Title)"		Abhijit Majumdar
2021	Herogiri	200	"Tiding Tiding"	Pamela Jain	Abhijit Majumdar
2022	Hau Hau Heigala Re	201	"Hau Hau Heigala Re (Title)"	Antara Chakraborty	Bimugdha Das
2022	Mr. Kanheya	202	"Sakuntala"		Baidyanath Dash
2022	Mr. Kanheya	203	"God Promise"	Aseema Panda	Baidyanath Dash
2022	Krazzy 4	204	"Hulchul Hulchul"		S. Chandrakant
2022	Mana Mora Kagaz Gudi	205	"Chori Chori Chandini Ku Rajanandini"	Jyotirmayee Nayak	Japani Bhai
2022	Jatha Rabanasya Mandodari	206	"Mu Pushpa Hele Srivalli Tu"	Smrutimayee Mohapatra	Abhijit Majumdar
2022	Aau Gote Love Story	207	"Lekhiba Aa Lekhiba"	Lipi Mishra	Baidyanath Das
2022	Prema ATM	208	"Madhubala"	Diptirekha Padhi	Abhijit Majumdar
2022	Dil Mora Manena	209	"Dil Moro Manena (Title)"	Ananya Nanda	Prem Anand
2022	Biswanath	210	"Jeebana Ta Lage"	Sohini Mishra	Abhijit Majumdar
2022	Biswanath	211	"Ore Gho Gho Re"	Jagruti Mishra	Abhijit Majumdar
2022	Eka Tu Eka Mu	212	"Mana Mora Garden Garden"	Nibedita	Manmath Mishra
2022	Eka Tu Eka Mu	213	"Eka Eka Mun"		Manmath Mishra
2022	Bidyarana	214	"Jaan Neigalu Jaan"	Lipsa Mahapatra	Baidyanath Dash
2022	Lage Prema Najar	215	"Lage Prema Najar"	Ananya Nanda	Baidyanath Dash
2022	Astika Nastika	216	"E Dil Ta To Diwana"	Aseema Panda	Goodly Rath
2022	Dil Re Achi Tori Naa	217	"Dil Re Achi Tori Naa (Title)"	Amrita Nayak, Antara Chakrabarty	Abhijit Majumdar
2022	Dil Re Achi Tori Naa	218	"Dil Bejuban"	Anuradha Panigrahi	Abhijit Majumdar
2022	Kahibini Tate I Love You	219	"Pagala Ete Agaru"	Diptirekha Padhi	Tubun Sen
2022	Kahibini Tate I Love You	220	"First Time Aji Kain Mana"		Baidyanath Dash
2022	Kahibini Tate I Love You	221	"Saga Pakhala"	Arpita Choudhury	Baidyanath Dash
2022	Kahibini Tate I Love You	222	"Ete Khusi Jadi"		Baidyanath Dash
2022	Sesharaati	223	"Prema Aauthare Hei Gala"		Asad Nizam
2022	Kichhi Kahibara Achhi	224	"Aji Kali Pabana"	Nibedita	Prem Anand
2022	Ai Rakhi To Rakshya Kabacha	225	"Prema Au Prema Ra Asara"	Neha Niharika	Baidyanath Dash
2022	Mahabahu	226	"Kie Sei Manara Manisa"	Diptirekha Padhi	Prem Anand
2022	Chumki	227	"Jibana Tu"	Antara Chakrabarty	Bibhuti Bhusan Gadanayak
2022	Bali - The Saviour	228	"Haire Hai Mo Anarakali"	Aseema Panda	Sanjay - Situ
2022	Bali - The Saviour	229	"Palaka Padena"	Shreya Mishra	Sanjay - Situ
2022	Prema Re Risk Hela Mote Ishq	230	"Tate Pai Mu"	Arpita Choudhury	Sanjay Patra Situ Rath
2022	Oye Anjali	231	"Maribaku De"		Prem Anand
2022	Rudrani	232	"Feel My Dil"	Ananya Nanda	Prem Anand
2022	Tu Mora OK	233	"Saware Saware"	Shriya Mishra	Asad Nizam
2022	Tu Mora OK	234	"Tu Mora OK (Title)"	Aseema Panda	Asad Nizam
2022	Tu Mora OK	235	"Tu Kie Mora"		Asad Nizam
2022	Sahari Bagha	236	"Jami Gala Ethara Ama Jodi"	Amrita Nayak	Bombay Bhole
2022	Sahari Bagha	237	"Dheere Dheere Ei Manaku"	Amrita Nayak	Bombay Bhole
2022	Pratikshya	238	"Kaha Re Akasha (Album Version)"		Ankesh-Ashish
2022	Life Re Kichhi Bi Heipare	239	"Bhala Lage Chalibaku (Title Track)"	Nibedita	Bikash Das
2022	Life Re Kichhi Bi Heipare	240	"Tu Mora Gita Hele"	Nibedita	Bikash Das
2022	Prasthanam	241	"To Nisha Nisha Akhire"	Neha Niharika Kar	Asad Nizam
2022	Dear Love	242	"To Chhabi Bahi"	Jyotirmayee Nayak	Japani Bhai
2023	Tora Mora Katti	243	"Mu Tate Bhala Paye Ki"	Diptirekha Padhi	Prem Anand
2023	Udanta Thalire Asichi Priya	244	"Padigali Mun To Prema Re"	Antara Chakraborty	Baidyanath Dash
2023	Bohu Ama Bichhuati	245	"Kebethu Asila Mo Jibanare"	Neha Niharika	Baidyanath Dash
2023	Bajiba Lo Sahanai	246	"Mahire Mahire"		Tapas Das Amrutanshu Patnayak
2023	Prem For Sale	247	"Satarangi Re Satarangi"	Amrita Nayak	Abhijit Majumdar
2023	Sagara Puraru Asichi Priya	248	"Saragapura Ru"	Neha Niharika	Baidyanath Dash
2023	Delivery Boy	249	"Tu Dele Thare Chimuti"	Aseema Panda	Baidyanath Dash
2023	Delivery Boy	250	"Bachan Bhai LLB"		Baidyanath Dash
2023	Dho Re Babu Dho	251	"Hata Dhara Nahin"	Diptirekha Padhi	Abhijit Majumdar
2023	Shayari Shayari	252	"Shayari Shayari (Title)"		Baidyanath Dash
2023	Padigali To Premare	253	"Padigali To Premare"		Shoubhagya Samal
2023	Padigali To Premare	254	"I love You I Love You"	Diptirekha Padhi	Shoubhagya Samal
2023	Love in London	255	"Mate Laguchi Se Tora Heigalani"	Aseema Panda	Baidyanath Dash
2023	Guddu Gangster	256	"Prema Khanjani"	Aseema Panda	Asad Nizam
2023	Guddu Gangster	257	"Suneli Chamka"	Antara Chakraborty	Asad Nizam
2023	Pakhe Pakhe Thibi Harpal	258	"Katha Tora Painkiller"	Neha Niharika	Baidyanath Dash
2023	Pakhe Pakhe Thibi Harpal	259	"Kete Wait Mate Kareibu"	Arpita Choudhury	Baidyanath Dash
2023	Pakhe Pakhe Thibi Harpal	260	"Khoji Khoji Kalira Prema"		Baidyanath Dash
2023	To Pain Feribi Rahila Rana	261	"To Pain Feribi Rahila Rana (Title)"	Neha Niharika	Baidyanath Das
2023	Priye Tu Mo Siye	262	"Bhala Pauchhi Kete"	Ananya Nanda	Baidyanath Dash
2023	Priye Tu Mo Siye	263	"Chhati Tale Hastakhyara"	Aseema Panda	Baidyanath Dash
2023	Paglu	264	"Ore Mahi"		Abhijit Majumdar
2023	Adhura Prema Kahani	265	"Tu Tike Hot Boli"	Arpita Choudhury	Baidyanath Dash
2023	Adhura Prema Kahani	266	"Adhura Prema Kahani (Track)"	Aseema Panda	Baidyanath Dash
2023	Janha Ratira Sathi	267	"Abhimani Tu Abhisarika"	Aseema Panda	Goodly Rath
2023	Janha Ratira Sathi	268	"Saware"	Lipsa Mahapatra	Goodly Rath
2023	Love Impossible	269	"Premara A Ki Pagalami"	Aseema Panda	Baidyanath Dash
2023	Tu Sei Nilanayana	270	"Tu Sei Nilanayana (Title)"	Diptirekha Padhi	Prem Anand
2023	Tuma Bina	271	"Tuma Bina (Title)"	Lipsa Mohapatra	Goodly Rath
2023	Monalisa	272	"Monalisa (Title)"	Lipsa Mohapatra	Goodly Rath
2023	Kartavya	273	"Khuda Ka Shukriya"	Tina Kumari	P. Kumar
2023	Kasturi	274	"Chanhili Jete Mu Chahinbi Nahin"	Aseema Panda	Sibu Jena
2023	Kahide Thare I Love You	275	"Kahide Thare I Love You (Title)"		Asad Nizam
2023	Sankar	276	"Mo Bhitare Mu Au Nahi"	Diptirekha Padhi	Baidyanath Dash
2023	Kaincha Mali	277	"Kaincha mali (Title)"	Diptirekha Padhi	Baidyanath Dash
2023	Kaincha Mali	278	"To Prema Thila Mo Bhagyare"	Sital Kabi	Baidyanath Dash
2023	Kaincha Mali	279	"Kaincha mali (Sad Version)"		Baidyanath Dash
2023	Dotpen	280	"Aai Mana Ghara"		Somesh Sathpathy
2023	Malyagiri	281	"Baa"		Gaurav Anand
2023	Katak - Sesha Ru Arambha	282	"Tame Jadi Gadhidia Balighara"	Aseema Panda	Asad Nizam
2023	RAM	283	"Pungi"		Asad Nizam
2023	Pratha	284	"Aparupa Apsari"	Aseema Panda	Asad Nizam
2023	Tu Mo Subhadra Mu To Jaga	285	"Tu Mo Hrudaya Sathi"	Neha Niharika	Biraja Prasad
2023	Om Swaaha	286	"Anyamanaska"	Ira Mohanty	Malay Mishra
2023	Om Swaaha	287	"Om Swaaha (Title)"		Malay Mishra
2024	Kemiti Bhulibi Mun	288	"Besahara Mana"	Pragyan Hota	Baidyanath Dash
2024	Samaya Kahiba Kie Kahara	289	"Preyasi"	Aseema Panda	Shantiraj Khosla
2024	Samaya Kahiba Kie Kahara	290	"Tu Mo Rehenuma"	Antara Chakraborty	Shantiraj Khosla
2024	Aei Ama Prema Kahani	291	"Aei Ama Prema Kahani (Title)"	Aseema Panda	Chandan Kumar
2024	Aei Ama Prema Kahani	292	"Tu Aau Kahara Nuhan"	Aseema Panda	Chandan Kumar
2024	Shanti Appartment	293	"Kalakaar"	Arpita Choudhury	Sandeep Panda
2024	Ashiq Surrender Hela	294	"Ashiq Surrender Hela"	Ananya Nanda	Prem Anand
2024	Ashiq Surrender Hela	295	"Jibanathu Tu Mora Bhari Jaruri"	Diptirekha Padhi	Prem Anand
2024	Mo Kahanire Tori Naa	296	"Mo Kahanire Tori Naa (Title)"	Diptirekha Padhi	Abhijit Majumdar
2024	Shriman Shrimati	297	"Mo Room Sara To Deha Basna"	Nibedita	Abhijit Majumdar
2024	Vote	298	"Mana Thila Baanara Pabana"		Bikash Das
2024	Jayveer	299	"Prema Hastakshyara"	Jyotirmayee Nayak	Japani
2024	Jayveer	300	"Dhana Mora Dhana"	Rupali	Japani
2024	Operation 12/17	301	"Mu Khojibathu Paigali Besi"	Ananya Nanda	Baidyanath Dash
2024	Tate Sohala Ku Mate Satara	302	"Tate Sohala Ku Mate Satara (Title)"	Pragyan Hota	Baidyanath Dash
2024	Tate Sohala Ku Mate Satara	303	"Di Taa Pilara Mummy"	Aseema Panda	Baidyanath Dash
2024	Tike Tike Achihna Tu	304	"Lambi Lambi Jaantaki Rasta"	Sohini Mishra	Prem Anand
2024	Tike Tike Achihna Tu	305	"Pahili Raja"	Diptirekha Padhi	Prem Anand
2024	Dancing Star	306	"Srabanara Bunda Bunda"	Aseema Panda	Asad Nizam
2024	Kuhudi	307	"Bhabuthili Jemiti"	Ananya Nanda	Somesh Satpathy
2024	Bohu Amara Matric Fail	308	"Dhire Dhire Prema Gala Badhi"	Sital Kabi	Baidyanath Dash
2024	Sita – Sangharsa Ra Kahani	309	"Sita Lo"		Japani
2024	I Love You 2	310	"I Love You 2 (Title)"	Diptirekha Padhi	Prem Anand
2024	Atithi – The Unwanted Guest	311	"Ajana Atithi"	Arpita Choudhury	Ajana Atithi
2024	Sanam Tu Suhana	312	"Sanam Tu Suhana (Title)"	Ira Mohanty	Malaya Mishra Bijay Kumar
2024	Sanam Tu Suhana	313	"Tu Mora Tu Mora"	Ananya Nanda	Malaya Mishra Bijay Kumar
2024	Khoka Bhai Tama Pain: A Song Epic	314	"Gori Gori"	Pragyan Hota	Bhubaneswar Mishra Mitrabhanu Mohanty
2024	KARMA – When Destiny Strikes Back	315	"Chiring Chiring"		Ashish Pradhan
2024	KARMA – When Destiny Strikes Back	316	"To Pain Chale Spandana"	Antara Chakraborty	Baidyanath Dash
2024	Inspector Chulbul Pandey	317	"Haran Pa Pa Pa"	Diptirekha Padhi	Abhijit Majumdar
2024	Tu Mo Kamzori	318	"Tu Mo Kamzori (Title)"	Diptirekha Padhi	Prem Anand
2024	Tu Mo Kamzori	319	"Narangi Narangi"	Diptirekha Padhi	Prem Anand
2024	Tu Mo Kamzori	320	"Tu Mo Kamzori (Sad Version)"		Prem Anand
2024	Sapana Tie – A Dream	321	"Sapana Tie (Title)"		Prem Anand
2025	Wife	322	"Wife (Title)"	Ira Mohanty	Malaya Mishra
2025	Bhai – The Opening Part	323	"Tu Mora Bhai"	Amrita Nayak	Nabs and Saroj
2025	Kabadi	324	"A Prema"	Diptirekha Padhi	Abhaya Mishra
2025	Valentine – The Memorable Day	325	"Odda Odda Mana Mora"	Pragyan Hota	Gobind Senapati
2025	Racket	326	"To Dehara Basna"	Diptirekha Padhi	Prem Anand
2025	First Love	327	"Jay Jay King Khan"	Antara Chakraborty	Somesh Satpathy
2025	First Love	328	"Sata Thila Na Sarta"		Somesh Satpathy
2025	Jwain Puara Jibana Bima	329	"Kemiti Je Kahibi"	Aseema Panda	Goodly Rath
2025	Jwain Puara Jibana Bima	330	"Samarpana"	Lipsa Mahapatra	Goodly Rath
2025	Chi Re Nani	331	"Jedebele Dekhli"	Aseema Panda	Asad Nizam
2025	Delivery Boy 2	332	"Local Madhuri"	Aseema Panda Chiragdeep Panda	Baidyanath Dash
2025	Delivery Boy 2	333	"Prema Heijae"	Ananya Nanda	Baidyanath Dash
2025	Delivery Boy 2	334	"To Bina Mu Adha"	Antara Chakraborty	Baidyanath Dash
2025	Delivery Boy 2	335	"To Bina Mu Adha (Sad Version)"	Antara Chakraborty	Baidyanath Dash
2025	Charidham - A Journey Within	336	"Kerkeraa"	Pamela Jain	Baidyanath Dash
2025	Challenge	337	"Makhamali Misiri"	Ananya Nanda	Gaurav Anand
2025	Tora Mora Prema	338	"Tora Mora Prema (Title)"	Antara Chakraborty	Saroj Samal
2025	Vaastav	339	"Vaastav (Title)"		Baidyanath Dash
2025	Vaastav	340	"Tana Tana Tora Akhi"		Baidyanath Dash
2025	Vaastav	341	"Tu Juade Mu Siade"	Antarikshyaa Nayak	Baidyanath Dash
2025	Vaastav	342	"Pakhe Thile Bhala Lage"		Gyana Behera
2025	Shambhu	343	"Sona Sona"	Amrita Nayak	Deepak Kumar
2025	Darpana (The Mirror)	344	"Jhare Jhara Sefali"	Ananya Nanda	Tunu Pattnayak
2025	Darpana (The Mirror)	345	"Ye Dil"	Antara Chakraborty	Tunu Pattnayak
2025	Namaste Kamala Mago 3	346	"Tame Hin Mora Prathama Prema"		Baidyanath Dash
2025	Miss Call Friend	347	"Aji Tharu Tu Mora"	Shreya Mishra	Baidyanath Dash
2025	Miss Call Friend	348	"Teka Mari Janha Jhadei Delu"	Jagruti Mishra	Baidyanath Dash
2025	Miss Call Friend	349	"Samparka Emiti Bandhana Tie"		Baidyanath Dash
2025	Motorcycle	350	"Premare Khele Kiti Kiti"	Ananya Nanda	Somesh Satpathy
2025	Haran	351	"Maliphula"	Aseema Panda	Asad Nizam
2025	Haran	352	"Chehera Tora"		Asad Nizam
2026	Pabitra Bandhan		"Rasuna Kaha Katha Jama Na Suna"	Aseema Panda	Baidyanath Dash
2026	Pabitra Bandhan		"Pabitra Bandhana Title Track"	Arpita Choudhury	Baidyanath Dash
2026	Apekhya		"Dine Nadekhile"	Ipsita Sahu	Baidyanath Dash
2026	Apekhya		"Raja Jema"	Aseema Panda	Baidyanath Dash
2026	Rakta Golapa		"Megha Kadamba"		Ashish Pradhan
2026	Mantra Muugdha		"Jalsa"	Antara Chakraborty	Ashish Pradhan

( Humane Sagar all odia film songs playlist - Click HERE )
