= Biswajit Mohapatra =

Indian Playback Singer from Odisha

Biswajit Mahapatra
- ବିଶ୍ୱଜିତ ମହାପାତ୍ର
- Born: Bhawanipatna, Odisha
- Education: Utkal University
- Known for: Playback Singer, Indian Idol

Biswajit Mahapatra is an Indian singer from Bhawanipatna, Odisha. He was a participant in Indian Idol Season 10. He has mostly worked as playback singer in Odia film Industry named 'Ollywood'.

== Early life ==
He was born in 1992 in Bhawanipatna, Odisha. He completed his graduation from Utkal University. He was the runner-up in reality singing show 'Voice of Odisha' in 2012.

== Career ==
After Voice of Odisha, he received offers from Odia film Industry. Since 2012 he has contributed in Odia films and released many solo albums. Then he participated in the Indian Idol in 2016.

== Indian Idol ==
=== Season 9 ===
Before joining this singing reality show, he was already an Odia playback singer. He took part in season 9 in 2016 and sang the popular Odia song 'Phuchuki gali' from film Suna Panjuri.He made into top 40 before getting eliminated.

=== Season 10 ===
Biswajit participated as a contestant in Indian idol season 10 in 2018, making into Top 14 for 4th round. In 4th round, he had performed a Marathi song "Hi Porgi Konachi" which was well received by the judges of the show. Biswajit got eliminated in 5th round.

== Discography ==
=== as Playback Singer ===
Year	Film	Song	Co-artist	Composer(s)	Language
2017	Kabula Barabula	"O sahiba"	Ananya Nanda	Prem Anand	Odia
2017	Kabula Barabula	"Sajna"	Diptirekha Padhi	Prem Anand	Odia
2017	Tu Mo Love Story	"Premare Papa Kete"	Ananya Nanda	Prem Anand	Odia
2018	Blackmail (2018 Odia film)	"Welcome Song"	Shabisesh & Lopamudra	Prem Anand	Odia
2018	Happy Lucky	"(Title Track)"	Shasank Sekhar	Prem Anand	Odia
2019	Chal Tike Dusta Heba	"Miss You Papa"	Solo	Bibhuti Bhusan Gadanayak	Odia

=== Albums ===
Year	Album	Track	Co-artist	Composer(s)	Language
2016	Sunle Maula	"(Title Track)"	Various	Rituraj Mohanty	Hindi
2018	Odia Fresh Hits	"Prathma Prema"	Solo	Priyabrata Das	Odia
2018	Sastha Ru Nastha	"(Title Track)"	Sumit Dikshit	Sumit Dikshit	Odia
2019	Hai Re	"(Title Track)"	Solo	Saroj Samal	Odia
