= Manara Manasi =

2018 Odia-language action film

- Directed by: Sachidananda Samal
- Screenplay by: Sachidananda Samal
- Story by: Sachidananda Samal
- Produced by: Jogendra Kumar sahoo
- Starring: Vivash, Sonali
- Cinematography: Chandan Maharana
- Edited by: Saumya Sobhan Nayak
- Music by: Sushil Dalai
- Release date: 2 March 2018
- Running time: 140 minutes
- Country: India
- Language: Odia language

Manara Manasi is a 2018 Odia language action film directed by Sachidananda Samal written by Tusharkanta Pattanayak. Starring Vivash and Sonali in the lead roles.

== Cast ==
- Vivash
- Sonali
- Ajit Das
- Kuni Mishra
- Pragya Ranjan

== Soundtrack ==
Manara Manasi

Soundtrack album by Sushil Dalai
- Released: 8 February 2019
- Recorded: 2018
- Genre: Tele-film soundtrack
- Length: 9:24
- Label: Cine 24

Music composed by Sushil Dalai. The soundtrack was released by Cine 24.

Track listing
No.	Title	Singer(s)	Length
1.	"Manara Manasi - Title Track"	Humane Sagar, Antara Chakrabarti	02:16
2.	"Hrudaya Mora"	Tariq Aziz, Diptirekha Padhi	02:30
3.	"Aasichi Aasichi Holi"	Bishnu Mohan Kabi, Sasanka Samir	04:38
