= Biju Babu =

- Poster
- Directed by: Debi Prasad Lenka; Vishal Mourya
- Written by: Debi Prasad Lenka; Vishal Mourya
- Produced by: Nila Madhab Panda; Manav Rath; Barnali Rath; Anuj Tyagi
- Starring: Anubhav Mohanty; Supriya Nayak
- Cinematography: Pratap Raout
- Edited by: Sandeep Sethi
- Music by: Prem Anand
- Production companies: Prakash Films; Eleeanora Images
- Distributed by: Prakash Films
- Release date: 29 March 2019
- Running time: 162 min
- Country: India
- Language: Odia

Biju Babu is a 2019 Indian Odia-language political action film written and directed by Debi Prasad Lenka and Vishal Mourya and produced by Nila Madhab Panda. It stars Anubhav Mohanty in the lead role. It is the first Odia film produced by Panda.

Mourya claimed it to be the most expensive Odia film at the time. Its first motion poster was released on International Mother Tongue Day. It was released on Odisha Day on 29 March 2019.

It is not a biopic of Biju Patnaik (the former Chief Minister of Odisha) as was widely rumored.

== Plot ==
Anubhav Mohanty fights with fake news and is inspired by Biju Pattanaik.

== Cast ==
- Anubhav Mohanty as Babu
- Supriya Nayak as Ragini
- Chittaranjan Tripathy
- Ashrumochan Mohanty
- Prangyan Khuntia

== Music ==
Biju Babu

Film score by Prem Anand
- Released: 29 March 2019
- Recorded: 2019
- Genre: Feature Film Soundtrack
- Length: 25:09
- Label: Sarthak Music
- Producer: Prem Anand

Prem Anand chronology
Nimiki (2019)	Biju Babu (2019)

Music composed by Prem Anand. The soundtracks was released by Siddharth Music.

Track listing
No.	Title	Singer(s)	Length
1.	"Batabana Aaji Jauthi"	Humane Sagar, Ananya Nanda	4.03
2.	"Tu Mate Kichhi Kahinu"	Humane Sagar, Diptirekha Padhi	5.00
3.	"Bhai Aame Bobal Toka"	Ashutosh Mohanty	3.22
4.	"Eka Eka lage Eka"	Ananya Nanda, Sabishesh	4.43
5.	"E Pabanata San San"	Diptirekha Padhi	3.53
6.	"Na Mun Bhujuparuni"	Shashank Shekar	3.17
