= Chal Tike Dusta Heba =

2019 Odia language film directed by Tapas Sargharia

- Directed by: Tapas Sargharia
- Screenplay by: Debidutta Mohanty; Tapas Sargharia; Sanjay Mohakul
- Story by: Dasratha Singh; Sanjay Mohakul
- Produced by: Manoranjan Sarangi
- Starring: Mahima, Sayal, Rishan
- Cinematography: Rabindra Behera
- Edited by: Rajesh Dash
- Music by: Bibhuti Bhusan Garnaik
- Production company: Tarang Cine Productions
- Distributed by: Tarang Cine Productions
- Release date: 11 January 2019
- Running time: 122 minute
- Country: India
- Language: Odia language

Chal Tike Dusta Heba is a 2019 Odia language film co-written and directed by Tapas Sargharia. The screenplay is written by Debidutta Mohanty. The film stars Mahima, Sayal and Rishan are in lead roles. The film is a teenage love story.

== Cast ==
- Rishan as Rishan
- Mahima as Annie
- Sayal Mukherjee as Sakshi Sasmal
- Mihir Das as Binayak/Mr.Bin (Rishan's Dad)
- Priyanka Mahapatra as Rishan's Mother
- Pradyumna Lenka as Sakshi's Dad
- Tribhuban Panda as Ghanta
- Aiswarya Behera as Aiswarya Ma'am (Teacher)
- Bhoomika Dash as Herself (Cameo)
- Saroj Das as Principal Sir
- Siba Prasad as Rishan's Friend
- Ashish Champaty as Rishan's friend
- Siddhartha as Rishan's Friend

== Plot ==
Rishan and Annie are teenagers fall in love with each other.

== Music ==
Chal Tike Dusta Heba

Film score by Bibhuti Bhusan Garnaik
- Released: 12 January 2019
- Recorded: 2019
- Genre: Feature Film Soundtrack
- Length: 25:09
- Label: Tarang Music
- Producer: Bibhuti Bhushan Garnaik

Bibhuti Bhusan Garnaik chronology
| Kalki Movie (2015) | Chal Tike Dusta Heba (2019) |

Music composed by Bibhuti Bhusan Garnaik. The soundtrack was released by Tarang Music.

Original Tracklist
| No. | Title | Singer(s) | Length |
|---|---|---|---|
| 1. | ""Chal Tike Dusta Heba"" | Tariq Aziz | 3.47 |
| 2. | ""Dear Darlu"" | Navya Jaiti, R.G.K | 4.02 |
| 3. | ""Jhum Le"" | Abhijit Mazumdar | 4.20 |
| 4. | ""Miss You Papa"" | Ashutosh Mohanty | 3.49 |
| 5. | ""Sun Saheba Sun"" | Humane Sagar, Diptirekha Padhi | 4.35 |
| 6. | ""Ye Loveship"" | Ananya Nanda, Swayam Padi | 4.47 |

== Release ==
The film was released on 11 January 2019 in theatres all over Odisha and it is the 18th movie to be released under the banner of Tarang Cine Productions.
