= Abhaya (film) =

- Directed by: K Muralikrishna
- Screenplay by: K Muralikrishna
- Produced by: Tarang Cine Productions
- Starring: Anubhav Mohanty; Elina Samantray; Manoj Mishra; Abhisek Bhatta
- Music by: Prem Anand
- Production company: Tarang Cine Productions
- Release date: 11 June 2017
- Country: India
- Language: Odia

Abhaya (Fearless) is an Odia action thriller film produced by Tarang Cine Productions. Anubhav Mohanty, Elina Samantray, and Manoj Mishra feature in lead roles. A remake of Tamil film Ivan Veramathiri (2013), the key sequences of the screenplay (not found in the original version) were based on the Kannada film Chakravyuha (2016).

== Plot ==
In the bustling city, Abhaya is just an average guy, a middle-class youth with a simple life and a loving family. The irony is that his father is a police officer.

A former gangster and present Odisha State Law minister asks for an illegal quota in student admissions in Government Law College, but the principal refuses. In order to remove the principal, he instigates violence on the law college campus using his students and his brother Satyaprakash in the college. One of the students manages to come out of the campus, but gets badly wounded. Before fainting, he reveals the minister's plans to Abhaya. Abhaya, along with his friends takes the student to the hospital and learns that he is suffering from blood loss. Abhaya then takes Anu, a college student, and makes her donate blood, but the next day the student dies, and his grief-stricken mother screams in public.

But beneath his quiet exterior, Abhaya is deeply frustrated by that corrupt minister and his ruthless brother, Satyaprakash, who rule the city through fear and violence. He takes the incident seriously and made a perfect plan. He kidnaps Satyaprakash, who is the brother of the minister, where he locks him in an abandoned construction site. The next day, Satyaprakash tries to escape, but Abhaya disguises himself and thrashes Satyaprakash, locking him in a half built bathroom at an abandoned construction site for 6 days. Satyaprakash is forced to drink latrine water to stay alive.

Abhaya never reveals his face or his name. He doesn't want money; he wants to humiliate the villains and show the public that these powerful leaders are vulnerable.

At the same time, due to certain coincidences, Abhaya again meets that sweet girl named Anu. Anu falls for Abhaya and he also. In a cafe, he tells her humorously to eat chillies if she really loves him. She starts eating chillies seriously, then immediately he expressed his feelings for her. Their love-life continues smoothly.

The minister tries to find Satyaprakash, but to no avail. He has to leave his minister post as he had given legal assurance for his brother's parole. He is also removed from the state cabinet. He is also arrested by the police. After that, Abhaya releases fainted Satyaprakash on the highway, who is admitted in hospital. When he learns about his brother's imprisonment, he decides to take revenge. Satyaprakash is consumed by a singular, psychotic obsession of finding the man who kidnapped him. He uses his entire criminal network to scan the city, looking for any tiny clue

Meanwhile, Abhaya goes back to his normal life. He falls more for Anu and their love-bond becomes stronger. For a while, it seems he has gotten away with his mission. He believes he has taught the villains a lesson and can now live in peace.

When the police learn about Satyaprakash's plans, they try to arrest him. But, he escapes and stops a biker for lift, who is revealed to be Abhaya. He escapes by leaving Satyaprakash. Soon he realises that the Abhaya was the kidnapper by noticing his locket.

Due to an error made by Abhaya, Satyaprakash learns about his family members and also Anu. He captures Anu in an attempt to find his kidnapper, and later ties her disguised in a closed room in a building. Abhaya and Anu's family start searching for Anu. Satyaprakash challenges Abhaya to save the people who are beloved to him. Abhaya finds the building, thrashes the goons and Satyaprakash. He manages to save Anu. While he is taking her, Satyaprakash agay tries to attack Abhaya, but Abhaya's father shoots and kills him. He salutes his son and tells him to leave. Abhaya leaves with Anu and they reunite.

== Cast ==
- Anubhav Mohanty as Abhaya
- Elina Samantray as Anu
- Mihir Das
- Manoj Mishra
- Ashrumochan Mohanty
- Anita Das
- Pratibha Panda
- Saroj Das
- Sankarsan Pradhan

== Music ==
The music for Abhaya is composed by Prem Anand while the lyrics are written by Basant Raj Samal and Subrat Swain.

Abhaya

Film score by Prem Anand
- Released: 11 June 2017
- Recorded: 2017
- Genre: Feature Film Soundtrack
- Language: Odia
- Director: Murali Krishna
- Producer: Tarang Cine Productions

| No. | Title | Singer(s) | Length |
|---|---|---|---|
| 1. | "Tate Mu Jhuruchi" | Humane Sagar, Lopamudra | 5:26 |
| 2. | "Rabba Rabba" | Humane Sagar, Ananya Sritam Nanda | 5:49 |
| 3. | "Gajal Gajal" | Humane Sagar, Diptirekha Padhi | 4:26 |
| 4. | "Tu mora kieki" | Ananya Sritam Nanda | 3:59 |
| 5. | "Abhaya (title song)" | Humane Sagar | 4:15 |
| Total length: | | | 22.75 |
