= Prem Kumar: Salesman of the Year =

2018 Ollywood Movie by Tapas Sargharia

Prem Kumar Salesman of the Year
- Directed by: Tapas Sargharia
- Written by: Sanjay Mahakul, Sakti Baral
- Screenplay by: Tapas Sargharia; Debidutta Mohanty
- Produced by: Tarang Cine Productions
- Starring: Anubhav Mohanty; Sivani Sangita; Tamanna Vyas
- Edited by: Rajesh Dash
- Music by: Prem Anand
- Release date: 16 October 2018 (Odisha)
- Country: India
- Language: Odia

Prem Kumar: Salesman of the Year is a 2018 Action Odia language film directed by Tapas Sargharia and produced under banner Tarang Cine Productions. The movie stars Anubhav Mohanty, Tamanna Vyas and Shivani in lead roles. The movie is a remake of 2016 Punjabi movie Ambarsariya.

== Plot ==
Kumar aka Prem Kumar is a policy agent in an insurance company. He is very successful, selling 50 policies in a single day.

The story then switches to RAW headquarters where Prem is entering as an officer. It is revealed that Prem is a RAW secret agent disguised as an insurance agent. He was assigned to decode a phone call from which he learned that the defense minister's life is at risk and some person named SAROJ is to kill him in Bhubaneswar. He set out to Bhubaneswar to trace the person and tracked down three suspects, namely Saroj Das, an event manager; Saroj, a dance teacher; and Saroj Khan, a very intelligent lady with ambitious of becoming an actress. He starts to spy on them. Meanwhile, he rents a room at Simran's house and eventually falls in love with her.

During his investigation he discovers that all the people he has suspected are innocent and have no connections to terrorist groups. Simran thinks he has deceived her and asks him to leave. Prem, out of duty, does not tell her his real identity and leaves.

Prem begins to track down the real culprit and comes in contact with one of henchmen of the group who tried to kill him. He learns that there is no change in plan and Saroj is going to kill the minister. He tries to pass the information to Simran, but she doesn't respond. He calls Saroj Das who succeeds in passing the information to Simran; she is told to reveal it only to the minister or his secretary.

When Simran speaks to the secretary, he takes her away from the auditorium and locks her in a room. It is then revealed that the secretary is the mastermind. Meanwhile, Prem reaches the hall and is also kidnapped by the secretary. After an intense fight with the secretary's henchmen, he saves Simran and heads off to save the minister. Saroj Khan has been watching all this from a control room and comes to help Prem take care of Simran.

Prem learns that Bablu, Simran's brother, is actually Saroj Kumar and is going to kill the minister in an act of Bhagat Singh. Prem reaches him in time and makes Saroj realize that the real General Diare and fired the secretary.

Prem returns from his mission to take care of Simran and promises her not to take on any further missions. He receives a call that reveals the real culprit, who is above the secretary, has been traced to Abu Dhabi and he has to go there. When Simran asks why he must go to Abu Dhabi he says he wants to have their honeymoon there and the film ends.

== Cast ==
- Anubhav Mohanty
- Tamanna Vyas
- Sivani Sangita
- Kuna Tripathy
- Chittaranjan Tripathy
- Pradyumna Lenka
- Shakti Baral
- Choudhury Bikash Das
- Manoj Mishra

== Soundtrack ==
Prem Kumar: Salesman of the year

Film score by Prem Anand
- Released: 16 October 2018
- Recorded: 2018
- Genre: Feature Film Soundtrack
- Length: 25.55
- Language: Odia
- Director: Tapas Sargharia
- Producer: Tarang Cine Productions

The music of this film is composed by Prem Anand and Lyrics are written by Basantraj Samal, Subrat Swain and Debidutta Mohanty.

Original Tracklist
No.	Title	Lyrics	Singer(s)	Length
1.	"Sunjaara Sunjaara"	Basantraj Samal	Humane Sagar, Ananya Nanda	04.27
2.	"Jhumka Tike Haleide"	Basantraj Samal	Diptirekha Padhi, Ashutosh Mohanty	02:56
3.	"To Sathire Jebe Dekhahue"	Subrat Swain	Ananya Nanda	04:33
4.	"First To Pain"	Debidutta Mohanty	Diptirekha Padhi, Ashutosh Mohanty	04:10
5.	"Premara Maza Nabaa"	Subrat Swain	Satyajeet Pradhan, Lopamudra Dash	03:22
6.	"Dil Se Bande Mataram"	Basantraj Samal	Rituraj Mohanty	07:07
Total length:				25.55

== Production ==
During the shooting actor Anubhav Mohanty was injured on the set, so shooting of the film got delayed. The film was supposed to be released during Raja festival but it was released during Durga puja. Songs of the movie were shot in Kashmir. Initially the film was believed to be inspired by Rocket singh. During the audio release lead actor Anubhav Mohanty confirmed it was not a remake and not inspired by any movie, however the story has similarities to Ambarsariya a Punjabi movie.

== Release ==
Previously it was finalised to be released on the day of Raja Festival. But due to some development of the film It was released on 16 October 2018 during Durga Puja in theatres all over Odisha.
