= Tu Mo Hero =

- Directed by: Dillip Panda
- Screenplay by: Dillip Panda
- Produced by: Chamarti Srinibas Rao
- Starring: Jyoti Ranjan Nayak; Jhilik Bhattacharya; Mihir Das
- Edited by: Chandrasekhar Mishra
- Music by: Baidyanath Dash
- Production company: Uday Movies
- Release date: 20 October 2017
- Country: India
- Language: Odia

Tu Mo Hero is a 2017 Indian Odia drama and romance film released on 20 October 2017. The film stars Jyoti Ranjan Nayak, Jhilik Bhattacharya and Mihir Das in key roles.

== Synopsis ==
Lata and her husband Sambhu get introduced at Salia Sahi in Bhubaneswar. Sambhu and Lata adopt his sister's son Prem. Prem is the most stylish among the boys which makes Khushi daughter of State Bank manager Abhiji fall in love with him. But her father is against their relationship and wants Khushi to marry the son of a wealthy builder. Heartbroken, Prem attempts suicide but survives somehow. The rest of the movie conveys how they fight to be together.

== Cast ==
- Jyoti Ranjan Nayak
- Jhilik Bhattacharya
- Mihir Das
- Priyanka Patnaik
- Bikash Das
- Jaya Biswas
- Guddu
- Kalia
- Soumya
- Bulu
- Pratibha Sahu
- Jeevan Panda
- Dev Sethy
- Chakradhar Jena
- Rajani Ranjan
- Rock Patra
- Master Suhana

== Soundtrack ==
Tu Mo Hero

Soundtrack album by Baidyanath Dash
- Released: 20 October 2017
- Recorded: 2017
- Studio: Zee Music Odia
- Genre: Feature film soundtrack
- Length: 29:07
- Language: Odia
- Director: Dillip Panda
- Producer: Chamarti Srinibas Rao

Complete soundtrack album was released on 20 October 2017. The song "Aashiqana" is based on "Awaara Dil" from Ki Kore Toke Bolbo (2016).

All music is composed by Baidyanath Dash.

Track listing
No.	Title	Lyrics	Singer(s)	Length
1.	"Tu Mo Hero"	Nirmal Nayak	Humane Sagar, Asima Panda	4:03
2.	"Goldeniya Chumma"	Jayant Das	Tarique Aziz, Sobha	3:31
3.	"Patei Janile"	Nirmal Nayak	Satya	4:11
4.	"Aashiqana"	Bapu Goswami	Humane Sagar, Ananya Nanda	4:02
5.	"Akhire Akhire"	Arun Mantri	Pragnya	3:52
6.	"Ye Ki Prema"	Bijay Malla	Humane Sagar	4:42
7.	"Do Re Baya Do"	Arun Mantri	Asima Panda	4:42
Total length:				29:07
