= 4 Idiots =

- Directed by: Basanta Sahoo
- Written by: Basanta Sahoo
- Screenplay by: Dr. Rajani Ranjan
- Produced by: Akshay Kumar Parija, Prashant Behera & K Sunil Kumar Yadav
- Starring: Sabyasachi Mishra; Akash Dasnayak; Kuna Tripathy; Chittaranjan Tripathy; Elina Samantray; Lipsa Mishra; Poonam Mishra
- Edited by: Rajesh Dash
- Music by: Prem Anand
- Production companies: Akshay Parija Productions; Prakash Films Productions
- Distributed by: Zee Sarthak
- Release date: 14 June 2018
- Running time: 146 minutes
- Country: India
- Language: Odia

4 Idiots (stylized as 4 idiots) is a 2018 Indian Odia language comedy film directed by Basanta Sahoo and starring Sabyasachi Mishra, Akash Dasnayak, Kuna Tripathy, Chittaranjan Tripathy, Elina Samantray, Lipsa Mishra and Poonam Mishra. The music is composed by Prem Anand.

== Plot ==
"Four friends" referred as "4 Idiots" in the movie. They are living a Happy-go-Lucky life but one day they dragged accidentally into trouble. 3 of the idiots are married and only one (Sabysachi Mishra) is not married but is engaged and in love with a lady (Elina Samantray).

== Cast ==
- Sabyasachi Mishra
- Akash Dasnayak
- Kuna Tripathy
- Chittaranjan Tripathy
- Elina Samantray
- Lipsa Mishra
- Poonam Mishra

== Production ==
The launch event for the film was held at a hotel in Bhubaneswar with the star cast of the film. The star cast includes Kuna Tripathy, Akash Dasnayak, Papu Pom Pom and Sabyasachi Mishra, Chandini, Poonam Mishra, Lipsa Mishra and Elina Samantray. The principal photography of the film was started on 20 April 2018. This event was attended by Odia film and serial fraternity.

== Soundtrack ==
All songs are composed by Prem Anand and the song "Mad Romeo" is composed by G. Durga Prasad, Nabs & Saroj. An event was held for the music release of the film at Forum Mart, Bhubaneswar on 25 May 2018. The cast and crew of the film were also present at the event.

4 Idiots

Film score by Prem Anand
- Released: 29 May 2018
- Recorded: 2018
- Studio: Zee Sarthak
- Genre: Feature Film Soundtrack
- Language: Odia Language
- Label: Zee Music
- Director: Prem Anand
- Producer: Akshay Kumar Parija, Prashant Behera, K Sunil Kumar Yadav

Original Tracklist
No.	Title	Lyrics	Artist(s)	Length
1.	"Mad Romeo"	Kuna Tripathy	G. Durga Prasad
2.	"Aji Tharu"	Subrat Swain	Humane Sagar, Dipti Rekha Padhi
3.	"O Yaara"	Basant Raj Samal	Sabisesh Mishra, Ananya Nanda
4.	"Yoga Queen"	Dr. Nirmala Nayak	Pamela Jain
5.	"Aji Tharu"	Subrat Swain	Humane Sagar, Dipti Rekha Padhi

== Release ==
This film was released on 14 June 2018 on the day of Raja Festival.
