= Dekha Hela Prema Hela =

2019 Indian Odia-language film

- Directed by: T Ganesh
- Screenplay by: T Ganesh
- Story by: Ramesh Barik
- Produced by: Ramesh Barik
- Starring: Subhasis Sharma, Avisekh Rath, Ragini Sutradhar
- Cinematography: R Bhagat Singh
- Music by: S Chandrakanta
- Release date: 26 September 2019
- Running time: 128 minutes
- Country: India
- Language: Odia language

Dekha Hela Prema Hela is a 2019 Odia language romantic film directed by T Ganesh written by Ajay Samal. Starring Subhasis Sharma, Avisekh Rath, and Ragini Sutradhar in the lead roles.

== Cast ==
- Subhasis Sharma
- Avisekh Rath
- Ragini Sutradhar
- Pradyumna Lenka
- Pratibha Panda
- Jojo

== Soundtrack ==
Dekha Hela Prema Hela

Soundtrack album by S Chandrakanta
- Released: 13 September 2019
- Recorded: 2019
- Genre: Feature film soundtrack
- Length: 10:48
- Label: Cine 24

Music composed by S Chandrakanta. The soundtrack was released by Cine 24.

Track listing
No.	Title	Singer(s)	Length
1.	"Dekha Hela Prema Hela - Title Track"	Diptirekha Padhi, Humane Sagar	04:54
2.	"Bhija Bhija Prema Chhita"	Swayam Padhi	03:25
3.	"Khas Tuma Pain"	Swayam Padhi	02:29
