= Kabula Barabula =

- Directed by: Ramesh Rout
- Screenplay by: Ashok Pati
- Produced by: Vijay Kandoi; Aviram Sahu
- Starring: Anubhav Mohanty; Elina Samantray; Abhisek Bhatta; Babul Mohanthy
- Cinematography: Pratap Rout
- Edited by: Rajesh Dash
- Music by: Prem Anand
- Production companies: Vidisha kraft & AB Films
- Release date: 27 September 2017
- Country: India
- Language: Odia

Kabula Barabula is a 2017 Indian Odia comedy film directed by Ramesh Rout. The film stars Anubhav Mohanty and Elina Samantray in the lead roles. The film was released on September 27, 2017. The movie is a remake of 2013 Punjabi movie Singh vs Kaur.

== Plot ==
The story is based on a village Odia man who is going to Malaysia to search for his Laila, the daughter of a rich father. Finding her proves difficult.

== Cast ==
- Anubhav Mohanty as Kabula
- Elina Samantray as Saloni
- Papu Pom Pom as Sweety
- Abhisek Bhatta
- Harihar Mohapatra
- Pradyumna Lenka as Village head
- Anisha
- Mantu
- Prince
- Anita Das
- Sambhu
- Devansh Maheshwar
- Banku Bala

== Production ==
The movie was developed under banner Amara Muzik, including more five Odia films in the next two years.

== Release ==
'Kabula Barabula' was released on September 27, 2017, on the occasion of Durga Puja.

== Box office ==
The film proved to be a hit by collecting a total of ₹2 crore (US$210,000). It became a hit at the box office.

== Soundtrack ==
Kabula Barabula

Soundtrack album by Prem Anand
- Released: 27 September 2017
- Recorded: 2017
- Genre: Feature film soundtrack
- Length: 26:17
- Language: Odia
- Director: Ramesh Rout
- Producer: Vijay Kandoi; Aviram Sahu

Music of this film was composed by Prem Anand. The complete soundtrack of this album was released on 27 September 2017.

Original Tracklist
No.	Title	Lyrics	Singer(s)	Length
1.	"Dussehra Bazara Sandha"	Basantraj Samal	Papu Pom Pom, Vinod Rathod	3:36
2.	"Zalima O Zalima"	Basantraj Samal	Ananya Nanda, Humane Sagar	4:04
3.	"O Sahiba"	Basantraj Samal	Ananya Nanda, Biswajeet Mohapatra	4:30
4.	"Sonu"	Basantraj Samal	Abhijeet Majumdar	3:44
5.	"Sajna"	Basantraj Samal	Diptirekha Padhi, Biswajit Mohapatra	5:11
6.	"Sajna Reprise"	Basantraj Samal	Diptirekha Padhi, Biswajit Mohapatra	5:12
Total length:				26:17
