= Baby (2016 film) =

- Film Poster
- Directed by: K Muralikrishna
- Screenplay by: K.Murali Krishna; Aditya Raj Panigrahi
- Produced by: Pooja Bharlawala
- Starring: Anubhav Mohanty; Preeti Priyadarshini; Poulomi Das; Jhilik Bhattacharya
- Production company: Saurav Entertainments
- Release date: 2016
- Country: India
- Language: Odia

Baby is a 2016 Indian Odia drama film directed by K Muralikrishna and produced under Saurav Entertainment. Anubhav Mohanty, Preeti Priyadarshini, Poulomi Das and Jhilik Bhattacharya are in the lead roles.

Mahurat of the film in Gadagadia Temple, Cuttack on 31 July 2016 and is scheduled for a release on Dussehra 2016. It is remake of Tamil movie Pichaikkaran.The music is released by Amara Muzik.

A

== Soundtrack ==
Baby

Soundtrack album by Prem Anand
- Released: 1 October 2016
- Genre: Feature film soundtrack
- Length: 34:12

The music of Baby is composed by Prem Anand while the lyrics are written by Arun Mantri and Subrat Swain . The full soundtrack was launched on 1 October 2016. Prior to that, Two Songs were released for "Baby (Title song)" and "Sun Zara" on 24 and 26 September respectively. And promotional videos of the songs "Askaa 40" and "Baby (Title song)" were released on 25 and 27 September respectively.

Track listing
No.	Title	Singer(s)	Length
1.	"Baby Title Song"	Humane Sagar, Chunmoon	4:42
2.	"Tu Mo Hridaya Ro Bhasha (Male)"	Madhav Das	2:53
3.	"Mu Kahinki Ete"	Ananya Nanda	4:24
4.	"Sun Zara"	Humane Sagar, Ananya Nanda	4:45
5.	"Askaa 40"	Govind Chandra & James	4:58
6.	"Kebe Sahe Kabe Suna"	Krishna Beura	3:28
7.	"Tu Mo Hridaya Ro Bhasha (Female)"	Dipti Rekha Padhi	2:53
8.	"Na Re Na"	Humane Sagar	4:32
9.	"Baby Title Song (Sad)"	Humane Sagar	1:37
Total length:			34:12
