= Happy Lucky =

- Directed by: Sudhanshu Sahu
- Screenplay by: Sanjay Mahakul; Debidutta Mohanty
- Starring: Sambit Acharya; Elina Samantray; Jyoti Ranjan Nayak; Sasmita
- Music by: Prem Anand
- Production company: Tarang Cine Productions
- Release date: 21 January 2018
- Running time: 159 Minutes
- Country: India
- Language: Odia

Happy Lucky is a 2018 Indian Odia-language romantic action comedy film directed by Sundhanshu Sahu. The film stars Sambit Acharya and Jyoti Ranjan Nayak opposite Sasmita and Elina Samantray respectively in lead roles. The film is an official remake of Tamil film Vettai.

== Plot ==
The film's story is about two brothers who fall in love with two sisters.

== Cast ==
- Mihir Das
- Jyoti Ranjan Nayak
- Sambit Acharya
- Sasmita
- Elina Samantray
- Bobby Mishra
- prithviraj
- Vikas
- Dipu
- Kalicharan
- Kalia

== Soundtrack ==
The music was composed by Prem Anand and the lyrics have been written by Basantraj Samal.

Happy Lucky

Film score by Prem Anand
- Released: 27 December 2017
- Recorded: 2017
- Studio: Tarang Cine Productions
- Genre: Feature Film Soundtrack
- Length: 18:30

Original Tracklist
No.	Title	Singer	Length
1.	"Osadha Nei Aa"	Ashutosh Mohanty, Asima Panda	3:48
2.	"Prema Tora Badamas"	Humane Sagar	4:01
3.	"Party Whole Night"	Satyajeet Pradhan	3:46
4.	"Chaliba Chaliba"	Diptirekha Padhi	3:20
5.	"Title Track"	Biswajit Mohapatra	4:15
Total length:			18:30

== Release ==
The audio was released at Municipality Kalyan Mandap, Chandrasekharpur at Odisha Television Limited's Rasagola Mahotsav. Which is released on 21 January 2018.

== Box office ==
The film did well at the box office. The total box office collection of this movie was 4.50 crore.
