= Nimki (film) =

2018 Odia language film

- Directed by: Susant Mani
- Produced by: Varsha Priyadarshini; Prelude; Subhashree films; Phoenix
- Starring: Varsha Priyadarshini; Ashrumochan Mohanty; Chittaranjan Tripathy; Trupti Sinha
- Music by: Prem Anand
- Production company: Zee Music
- Release date: 25 January 2019
- Country: India
- Language: Odia

Nimki is a 2019 Indian Odia language political propaganda film directed by Susant Mani. Varsha Priyadarshini plays lead role in this movie.

== Plot ==
This film is about the journey of a girl from Nimpur to Naveen Niwas, Bhubaneswar, in each step she finds new different obstacle but she never stops and find her way out.

== Cast ==
- Varsha Priyadarshini as Nimki
- Anubhav Mohanty as Himself (Cameo Appearance)
- Ashrumochan Mohanty
- Chittaranjan Tripathy
- Trupti Sinha
- Pragyan Khatua

== Soundtrack ==
The music of the film is composed by Prem Anand.

Nimki - Nimppur Ru Nabin Neebas

Soundtrack album by Prem Anand
- Released: 2018
- Recorded: 2018
- Genre: Feature film soundtrack
- Label: Zee Music Company
- Producer: Prem Anand

Prem Anand chronology
Ajab Sanju Ra Gajab Love (2019)	Nimki - Nimppur Ru Nabin Neebas (2018)	Biju Babu (2019)

Track listing
No.	Title	Lyrics	Artist(s)	Length
1.	"Ethiki sapana"	Nirmal Nayak	Tariq Aziz, Pamela Jain
2.	"Chota Mora Gaon Ti"	Nirmal Nayak	Humane Sagar
3.	"Mana Nache"	Nirmal Nayak	Swayam Padhi, Sohini Mishra
