= Love Dot Com =

- Theatrical poster
- Directed by: Rahat Quddusi
- Written by: Ramashankar
- Screenplay by: Rajani Ranjan
- Produced by: Rahat Quddusi
- Starring: Sabyasachi Mishra; Megha Ghosh; Bijay Mohanty; Tandra Roy; Harihara Mahapatra; Snigha Mohanty; Mihir Das; Kuna Tripathy
- Cinematography: Diigvijay Singh
- Edited by: Chandra Sekhar Mishra
- Music by: Prem Anand
- Release date: 21 September 2009
- Country: India
- Language: Odia

Love Dot Com is a 2009 Oriya film produced & directed by Rahat Quddusi. This film is a love story of two lovers, who has family rivalry. The movie is a remake of 1991 Malayalam movie Godfather.

== Plot ==
The story centers around the rivalry between two families headed by Bijay Mohanty & Snigdha Mohanty. Hero Raj (Sabyasachi Mishra) is the only son of Bijoy Mohanty and heroine Debajani (Megha Ghosh) is the daughter of Snigdha Mohanty. Raj & Debajani are studying in the same college. Both pretend to fall in love in order to seek revenge for their own families. But gradually both found they are indeed in love each other & decided to marry.

== Cast ==
- Sabyasachi Mishra as Raj
- Megha Ghosh as Debajani
- Bijay Mohanty
- Snigdha Mohanty
- Pupinder Singh
- Harihara Mahapatra
- Tandra Roy
- Kuna Tripathy
- Ratan Meher
- Mihir Das (guest appearance)
- Mumaith Khan
- Badal Mohanty
- Mika Singh
- Sambhavna Seth as item girl

== Soundtrack ==
The Composer of the film is Prem Anand

Track	Song	Singer(s)	lyric
1	Ei pruthibiru Dure Bahu Dure (Sad)	Raj Nagendra, Tapu Mishra	Arun Mantri
2	Ei pruthibiru Dure Bahu Dure Aa	Kumar Bapi, Tapu Mishra	Arun Mantri
3	Sabu Papara Prayaschita Achhi Sabu Bhulra	Saurabh Nayak	Rajani Ranjan
4	Prema heigala	Shri Charana, Pami	Rajani Ranjan
