= Agastya (film) =

- Poster of Agastya
- Directed by: K Muralikrishna
- Story by: Prashanth Neel
- Produced by: Akshya Kumar Parija
- Starring: Anubhav Mohanty; Minaketan Das; Jhilik Bhattacharya; Akash Dasnayak; Mihir Das
- Edited by: Chandrasekhar Mishra
- Music by: Prem Anand
- Production company: Akshay Parija production house
- Distributed by: AA films
- Release date: 12 June 2016
- Running time: 160 mins
- Country: India
- Language: Odia

Agastya is a 2016 Indian Odia action thriller film directed by K Muralikrishna and produced under Akshya Parija Productions. It was released on 12 June 2016 at Rajo Festival. Being a remake of the 2014 Kannada film Ugramm, it was one of the best Odia movies in 2016. Anubhav Mohanty, Akash, and Jhillik play lead roles. The music was released by Amara Muzik. It was a Superhit movie in the Odia film industry.

== Cast ==
- Anubhav Mohanty as Agastya
- Akash Das Nayak as Suraj
- Jhilik Bhattacharya as Neha
- Mihir Das as Rudra Pratap
- Minaketan Das
- Manoj Mishra
- Prithviraj Patanaik as Neha's Father
- Aswin Tripathy
- Agastya Asthana
- Kalicharan
- Pragnya Khatua
- Shankar
- Kumar
- Priyanka Patanaik (Agastya's Mother)

== Soundtrack ==
Agastya

Soundtrack album by Prem Anand
- Released: 12 June 2016
- Recorded: 2016
- Genre: Feature film soundtrack
- Length: 18:14
- Language: Odia
- Director: K.Murali Krishna

The complete soundtrack album was released on 27 September 2017.

All music is composed by Prem Anand.

Track listing
| No. | Title | Lyrics | Singer(s) | Length |
|---|---|---|---|---|
| 1. | "Agastya(Title Track)" | Subrata Swain | Ananya Nanda, Humane Sagar | 4:50 |
| 2. | "Dhire Dhire Bhala Pai Gali" | Subrata Swain | Ananya Nanda, Humane Sagar | 3:33 |
| 3. | "Rama Rama-e-Jhia Ta" | Arun Mantri | Pragyan Hota; Aryan Das; Ashutosh Mohanty; Humane Sagar | 3:30 |
| 4. | "Tipi Tipi Barsha Topa" | Subrata Swain | Ananya Nanda | 5:00 |
| 5. | "Dhire Dhire (Sad Version)" | Subrata Swain | Ananya Nanda, Humane Sagar | 2:31 |
| Total length: | | | | 18:14 |

== Satellite rights ==
Sarthak TV purchased the film's satellite rights for ₹4 crores, which was a record amount for an Ollywood film.
