= Tamanna Vyas =

Indian Odia actress

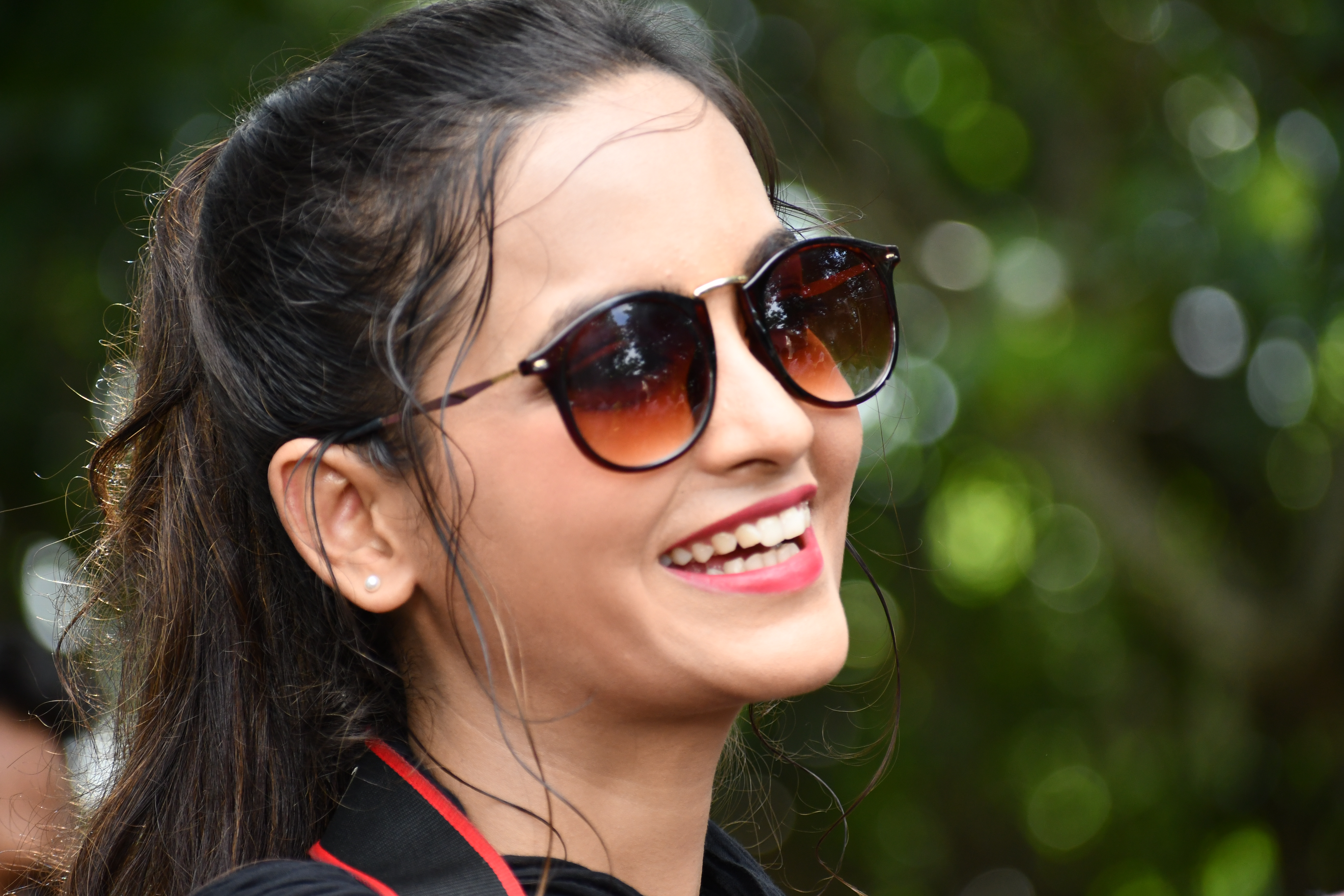
- Vyas at the shooting set of Prem Kumar: Salesman of the Year
- Born: 14 November 1996 (age 29); Brahmapur, Odisha, India
- Education: Khallikote College
- Occupation: Actor
- Years active: 2016–present
- Known for: Odia language Films
- Notable work: Prem Kumar: Salesman of the year, Blackmail, Golmal Love

Tamanna Vyas is an Indian actress who works in the Odia film industry. She made her debut in the movie Joker opposite actor Papu Pom Pom in 2015. She was selected in the Top 10 of the Miss Diva - 2018 competition in Mumbai.

== Early life ==
Tamanna was born and raised in Berhampur. She completed her schooling and college education in her hometown. She is a graduate in Bachelor of Business Administration. She came into limelight after winning the TV reality show 'Raja Queen' and was the runner-up in another reality show, 'Mu Bi Hebi Heroine' in 2015.

== Career ==
Tamanna got her first break in the comedy film Joker opposite actor Papu Pom Pom, which has not yet been released. She has recently acted in severAl films, including Bhaina Kana Kala Se opposite Balakrushna, Nijhum Ratira Sathi opposite Jyoti Ranjan Nayak, all directed by Sanjay Nayak. In 2018, she shared the screen with Anubhav Mohanty in the film Prem Kumar: Salesman of the year and with Ardhendu in Blackmail.

== Filmography ==
Year	Film	Role	Director
2016	Bhaina Kana Kala Se		Sanjay Nayak
2017	Nijhum Ratira Saathi		Sanjay Nayak
2017	Luchei De Mate Chhati Bhitare		Sanjay Nayak
2018	Blackmail		Amit Nayak
2018	Prem Kumar: Salesman of the year		Tapas Sargharia
2019	Golmaal Love		Ashok Pati
2020	Lucky Ra Lockdown Love Story	Honey	Ashok Pati
2021	Romeo Raja		Rakesh Samal
2022	Lagaam		Pinu Nayak
