= Tu Mo Love Story =

- Directed by: Tapas Sargharia
- Written by: Tapas Sargharia
- Produced by: Deepak kumar mishra
- Starring: Swaraj Barik; Bhoomika Dash; Mihir Das
- Production companies: Tarang Cine Productions and DK Movies
- Release date: 7 April 2017
- Country: India
- Language: Odia

Tu Mo Love Story is an Indian Odia-language drama film directed by Tapas Sargharia produced by Deepak Kumar Mishra for Tarang Cine Productions, and DK Movies. Starring Swaraj Barik and Bhoomika Dash, and with a screenplay by Tapas Sargharia, it was released on 7 April 2017.

== Cast ==
- Swaraj Barik
- Bhoomika Dash
- Mihir Das
- Priyanka Mahapatra
- Manoj Mishra
- Choudhury Bikash Das
- Debasish Patra
- Tribhuban Panda
- Bhakti Ranjan Das
- Sabita Dyna Behera

== Music ==
All songs are composed by Prem Anand.

- Music Director- Prem Anand
- Vocals - Asutosh Mohanty, Diptirekha Padhi, Humane Sagar, Ananya Nanda, Biswajit Mohapatra

=== Track listing ===
| Song | Lyrics | Singers | composer |
|---|---|---|---|
| Chal Ame Pakha Pakhi | Debidutta Mohanty | Asutosh Mohanty, Diptirekha Padhi | Prem Anand |
| Jadi Ae Jibanare | Subrat Swain | Humane Sagar, Ananya Nanda | Prem Anand |
| Premare Papa Kete | Debidutta Mohanty | Biswajit Mohapatra, Ananya Nanda | Prem Anand |
| Tike Tike Achinha | Arun Mantri | Diptirekha Padhi, Humane Sagar | Prem Anand |
| Tu Mo love Story | Debidutta Mohanty | Humane Sagar, Ananya Nanda | Prem Anand |
