= Bhoomika Dash =

Indian Odia film actress (born 2003)

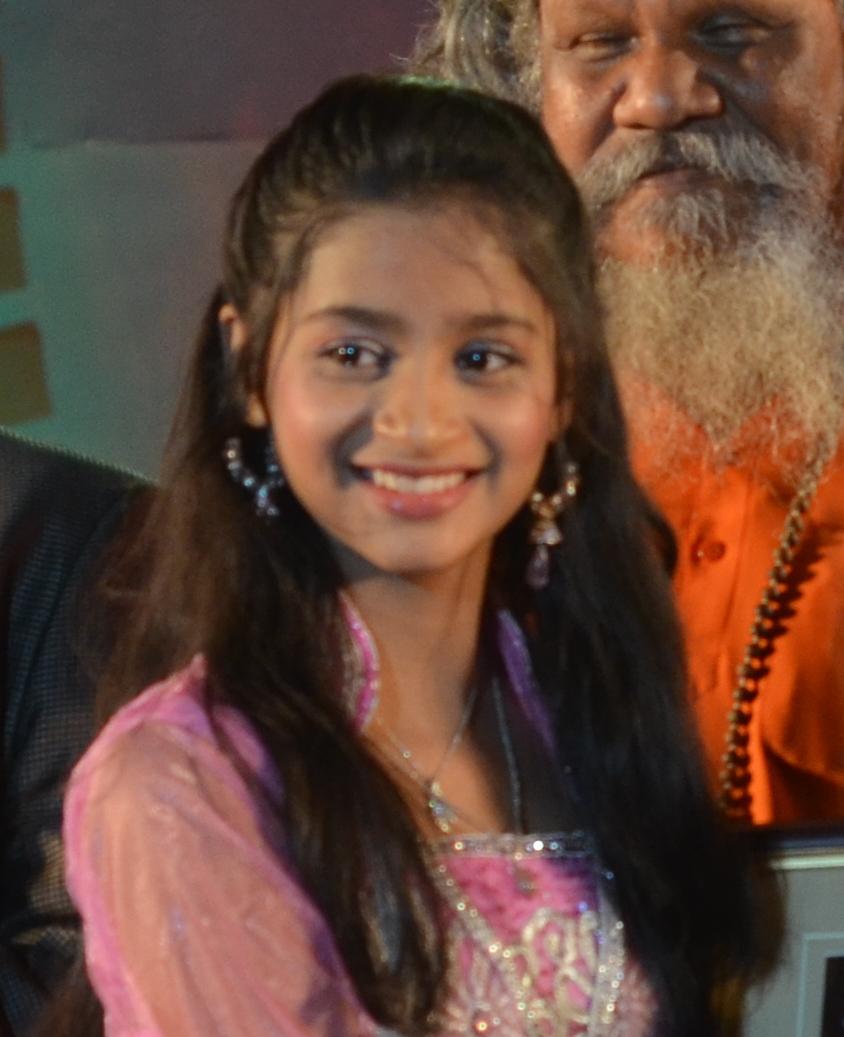
- Bhoomika while receiving Odisha State Film Award
- Born: 22 January 2003 (age 23); Bhubaneswar, India
- Education: Siksha 'O' Anusandhan
- Occupations: Actress, Classical Odissi Dancer
- Years active: 2014–present

Bhoomika Dash is an Indian actress and classical Odissi dancer who is known for her acting in the Odia film industry. She made her debut through an Odia movie called Rumku Jhumana as a child artist, then as a lead actress in the movie Tu mo love story.

== Early life ==
Bhoomika was born on 22 January 2003 in Bhubaneswar, Odisha to Trupti and Prasanna Kumar Dash. She did her schooling from DAV Public School, Unit-8, Bhubaneswar and currently pursuing her B.D.S. from Institute of Dental Sciences, Bhubaneswar.

== Career ==
Bhoomika Dash began her acting career in 2014 with the film Rumku Jhumana as a child artist alongside Harihar Mohapatra for which she received an Odisha State Film Award as the best child artist. Dash made her debut in Ollywood as a lead actress with the film Tu mo love story. In 2015, she appeared in the film Gapa Hele Bi Sata playing the child role of Barsha Priyadarshini. She continued her career in Ollywood along with her studies. She then appeared as the lead actress in the film Hero No. 1 alongside Babushan. In 2019, she appeared as Paro in the film "Nayakara Naa Devdash", a modern take on the legendary movie of the same name

== Filmography ==
Year	Title	Language	Notes
2014	Rumku Jhumana	Odia	Child artist
2015	Gapa Hele Bi Sata	Odia	Child artist
2017	Tu Mo Love Story	Odia	Lead
2017	Hero No.1	Odia	Lead
2018	Sriman Surdas	Odia	Lead
2019	Nayakara Na Debadaasa	Odia	Lead
2019	Tu Mo Love Story 2	Odia	Lead
2021	Mana Mo Neigalu Re	Odia	Lead
2021	Chakhyubandhan	Odia	Lead
2021	Au Gote Love Story	Odia	Lead
2022	Mana Mora Kagaja Gudi	Odia	Lead
2022	Mayavee	Odia	Lead
2023	Chandrama	Odia	Lead
2023	Zero Banhi Hero	Chhattisgarhi	Lead

== Awards and nominations ==
Year	Award	Category	Film	Result
2015	Odisha State Film Award	Best Child artist	Rumku Jhumana	Won
2015	5th Tarang Cine Awards	Best Child artist	Rumku Jhumana	Won
2018	9th Tarang Cine Awards	Star of Tomorrow	Tu Mo Love Story	Won
2018	Chalachitra Jagat	Best Newcomer	Tu Mo Love Story	Won
2021	Utkarsh Award	Best Actress	Tu Mo Love Story 2	Won
