= Tapu Mishra =

Indian singer (1985–2021)

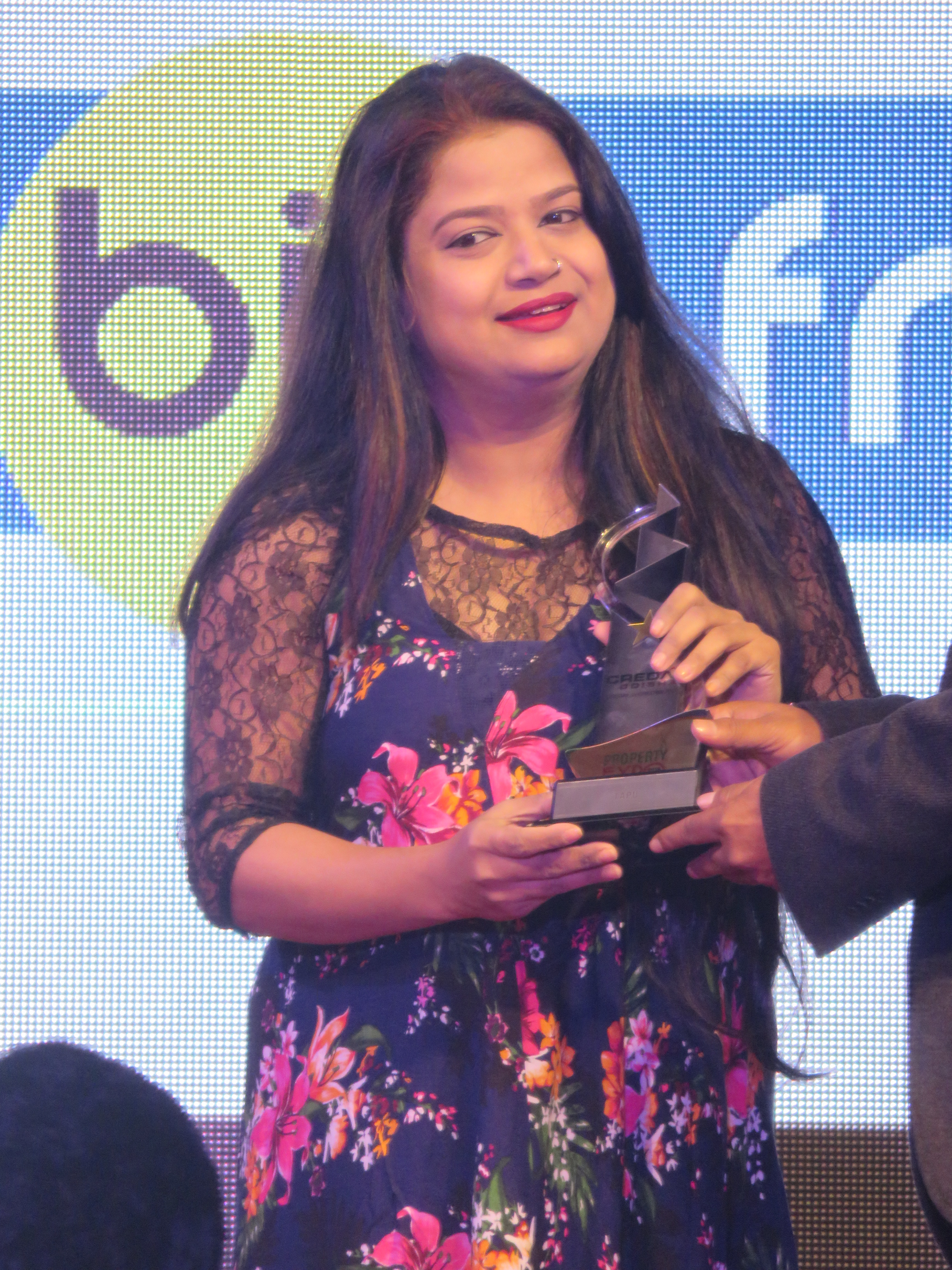
- Born: 11 January 1985; Sambalpur, Odisha, India
- Died: 19 June 2021 (aged 36); Bhubaneswar, Odisha, India
- Occupation: Singer

Tapu Mishra (Odia: ତପୁ ମିଶ୍ର; 11 January 1985 – 19 June 2021) was an Indian playback singer who worked mainly in the Ollywood industry. She sang in over 150 films including Mate Ta Love Helare, Dream Girl and Love Dot Com.

== Biography ==
Mishra was born in Sambalpur, Odisha. She began singing at a young age, taking lessons with Prabhudatta Pradhan and Gyan Ranjan Mohapatra. She received a degree in music from Sambalpur University, and later studied at Gandharva Mahavidyalaya.

Mishra made her debut as a playback singer in the Odia film Kula Nandan (1995), and went on to sing over 500 songs. Besides Odia, she sang in Bengali, Hindi, and other regional languages. She received four State Film Awards. She married actor Deepak Pujahari in 2018.

Mishra died from complications of COVID-19 in Bhubaneswar on 19 June 2021, aged 36. CM Naveen Patnaik, Union Minister Dharmendra Pradhan, and OFDC Chairman Kuna Tripathy paid tribute to her online. Many Ollywood film industry members attended her last rites.
