= Jyoti Ranjan Nayak =

Indian actor

Jyoti
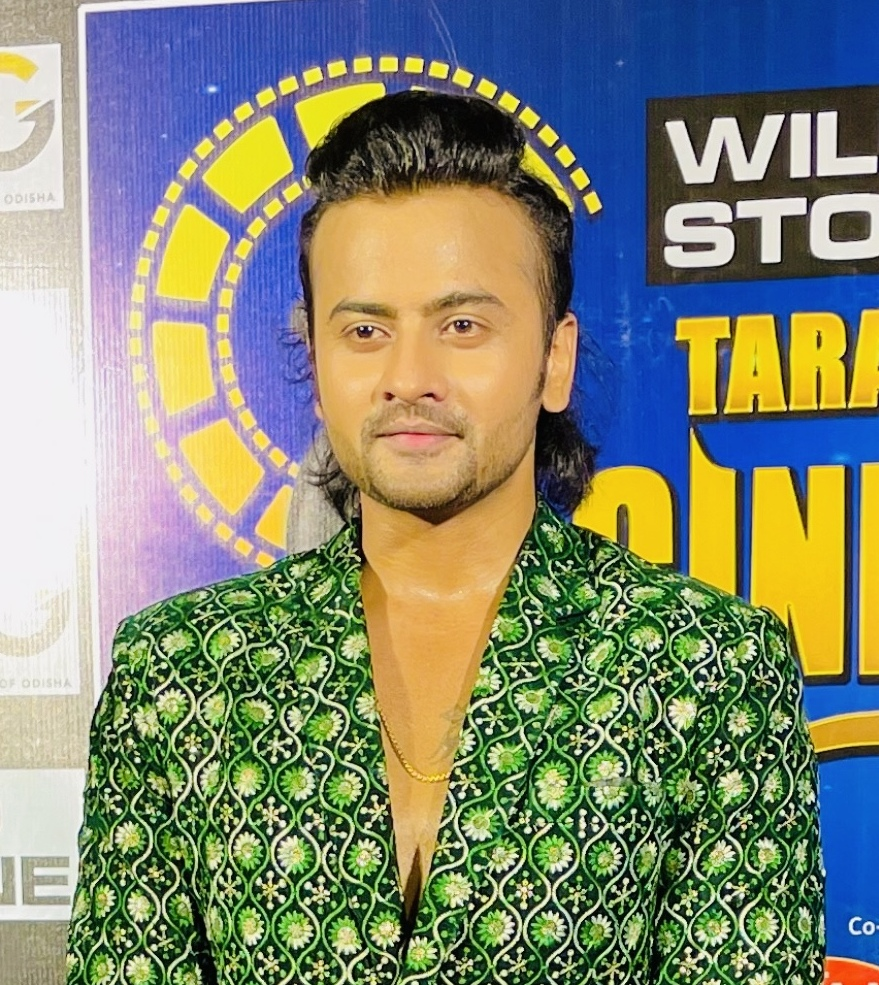
- Born: October 24, 1992 (age 33); Cuttack, Odisha, India
- Occupation: (Odia) actor
- Years active: 2016 – present
- Spouse: Simran Maharana (m. 2025)
- Parents: Ramesh Kumar Nayak (father); Jayashree Sahu (mother)
- Relatives: Ankit Kumar Nayak (brother)
- Awards: Tarang Cine Utsav, 2022

Jyoti Ranjan Nayak is an Indian actor who mostly appears in Odia Film Industry. He started his career in Ollywood through Mitha Mitha directed by Shrikant Gautam. But his first release was Dele Dhara Katha Sare. Later he appeared in Tu Mo Hero, Happy Lucky, Dil ka Raja, Nijhum Rati ra Sathi, Ole Ole Dil Bole, etc.

== Early life and education ==
He was born to Ramesh Kumar Nayak, an Indian Air Force officer and homemaker Jayashree Nayak in Cuttack, Odisha. He completed B. Tech from an institute in Chennai.

== Career ==
Nayak started his career through an Odia television reality show named Mitha Mitha Jodi telecasted on Colors Odia to cast lead actors for the Odia movie Mitha Mitha by Shrikant Gautam. He won this show and got the film, but before its release his first movie Dele Dhara Katha Sare by Shailendra Mishra released in 2016. Before debuting in Ollywood, he tried in Tamil Industry, but due to language barrier, he couldn't succeed.

=== Filmography ===
Year	Title	Director	Role	Note
2016	Dele Dhara Katha Sare	Shailendra Mishra		Debuted in Ollywood
2017	Nijhum Rati ra Sathi	Sanjay Nayak		
2017	Dil ka Raja	Dillip Panda		
2017	Mitha Mitha	Shrikant Gautam		
2017	Tu Mo Hero	Dillip Panda		
2018	Happy Lucky	Sudhanshu Mohan Sahoo	Lucky	
2018	Ole Ole Dil Bole	Kailash Mohapatra		
2018	Sathi Tu Pheria	Sudhakar Vasant		
2018	Pyar Alaga Prakara	Heera Chaudhury		
2019	Tu Mo Suna Chadhei	Dillip Panda		
2019	Premare Rakhichhi 100ru 100	Sanjay Nayak		
2019	From Me To You	Hemanta Sahoo		
2021	Tu Bhari Beautiful	Sanjay Nayak		
2021	Super Boy	K. Anish		
2021	Mana Mo Neigalu Re	Sanjay Nayak		
2022	Au Gote Love Story	Sanjay Nayak		
2022	Tu Mora Ok	Mrutyunjay Sahoo		
2023	Bibhrant	Biswabhushan Mohapatra		
2023	Dotpen	Aswini Tripathy		
2023	Om Swaaha	S. Dillip Panda		
2024	Shri Jagannath Nka Nabakalebara	Binny Samal		
2025	Motorcycle	Aswin Tripathy		
2025	Pari	Tripati Sahu		
2026	Mehermunda	Nikunj Hota		
2026	Danger Devdas	Aswin Tripathy		

== Awards ==
- Tarang Cine Utsav, 2022: Best Entertainer of the Year for Super Boy
