= Gapa Hele Bi Sata (2015 film) =

- Directed by: Murali krishna
- Written by: Nirmala Nayak
- Story by: R. Chandru
- Produced by: Jagi Mangat Panda
- Starring: Anubhav Mohanty; Barsha Priyadarshini; Mihir Das; Bikash Das
- Cinematography: Abhiram Mishra
- Release date: 12 June 2015
- Country: India
- Language: Odia

Gapa Hele Bi Sata is a 2015 Indian Odia-language drama film directed by Murali Krishna. The film stars Anubhav Mohanty and Barsha Priyadarshini is in the film as lead cast. Prem Anand is the music director. The movie is a remake of 2013 Kannada movie Charminar. This film released on Raja alongside Super Michhua and Love You Hamesha. The film was a box office failure.

== Cast ==
- Anubhav Mohanty
- Barsha Priyadarshini
- Dipika Tripathy
- Mihir Das
- Bikash Das
- Salil Mitra
