= Sohini Mishra =

Indian playback singer

Sohini Mishra is a playback singer based in Mumbai, India. She hails from Cuttack, Odisha. She came to limelight through Sony TV's reality show Indian Idol 6 (2012). She was one of the top six contestants.

Mishra is an approved artiste (B High Grade) of All India Radio, Cuttack, and she has received training in Hindustani classical vocal music under the tutelage of Pandit Devendra Narayan Satapathy. Her forte is classical music, though she can sing all kinds of songs. She has recorded songs in Odia, Hindi, and Bengali. She is a well known name in the Odia music and film industry. She has lent her voice to many Odia films and modern albums.

Mishra has an MS in Biotechnology from Ravenshaw University, Cuttack. She hails from a musical background. Both her father and mother are approved artistes of AIR, Cuttack. She has won several prestigious awards in the Best Playback Singer category. Notable among them are Big FM 92.7 Best Singer Award, Tarang Cine Best Playback Singer Award, the Governor's Award (Rajiv Gandhi Forum Award), and the Chief Minister's Award. Mishra also performs widely on the stage in India and abroad.

"Love Rainbow" is Mishra's debut solo album of Hindi songs, written by Mohan Majithia and composed by Om Prakash Mohanty.
