= Jhilik Bhattacharjee =

Indian actress

- Born: 1 June; West Bengal, India
- Other name: Tulia
- Occupations: Actress, Model
- Years active: 2013 – present
- Spouse: Pritiranjan Gharai (m. 2020)
- Children: 2
- Parent(s): Mrityunjay Bhattacharjee (father); Sumana Bhattacharjee (mother)

Jhilik Bhattacharjee is an Indian actress and filmmaker, who works in Odia and Bengali film industry. Lahari, directed by Amartya Bhattacharyya and made under her production won the National Film Award for Best Feature Film in Odia at the 72nd National Film Awards.

== Early life ==
Bhattacharjee was born in West Bengal. Her father is Mrityunjay Bhattacharjee and mother is Sumana Bhattacharjee. She is a trained dancer in Bharat Natyam and Katthak. She has also learnt modern dance from Shiamak Davar Dance Institute. She was also an assistant director under Mani Ratnam.

== Personal life ==
She is married to MLA Pritiranjan Ghadai in a private marriage ceremony in Chilika on 11 March 2020. Her father in law is the Former Finance Minister and BJD Vice President Sri Prafulla Chandra Ghadai.

== Career ==
Bhattacharjee started her career with the Bengali film Tomaye Bhalo Bashi. Apart from Tomaye Bhalo Bashi she has done many Bengali films such as Classmate, Identity, Neel Lohit, Encounter. In 2013 she made her debut with the Odia film Target. Apart from Target she has done many Odia film such as Akhire Akhire, Lekhu Lekhu Lekhi Deli, Super Michua, Zabardast Premika, Love You Hamesha.

== Filmography ==
Year	Film	Language	Ref.
2013	Tomay Bhalo Bashi	Bangla	
2013	Target	Odia	
2013	Identity	Bangla	
2014	Amar Ami	Bangla	
2014	Classmate	Bangla	
2014	Akhire Akhire	Odia	
2014	Lekhu Lekhu Lekhi Deli	Odia	
2015	Super Michhua	Odia	
2015	Zabardast Premika	Odia	
2015	Love You Hamesha	Odia	
2015	Jaga Hatare Pagha	Odia	
2015	Neel Lohit	Bangla	
2015	Encounter	Bangla	
2016	Agastya	Odia	
2016	Baby	Odia	
2017	Tu Mo Hero	Odia	
2017	Tamaku Dekhila Pare	Odia	
2018	Ole Ole Dil Bole	Odia	
2018	Pyar Alag Prakar	Odia	
2019	This is Maya re Baya	Odia	
2019	Ami Shudu Tor Holam	Bangla	
2022	Mr. Kanheiya	Odia	
2022	Rudrani	Odia	
2023	Bajiba lo sahanai	Odia	

== Awards ==
Year	Award	Category	Result
2015	Tarang Cine Award	Best Actress for Akhire Akhire	Won
