= Ananya Nanda =

Ananya Sritam Nanda
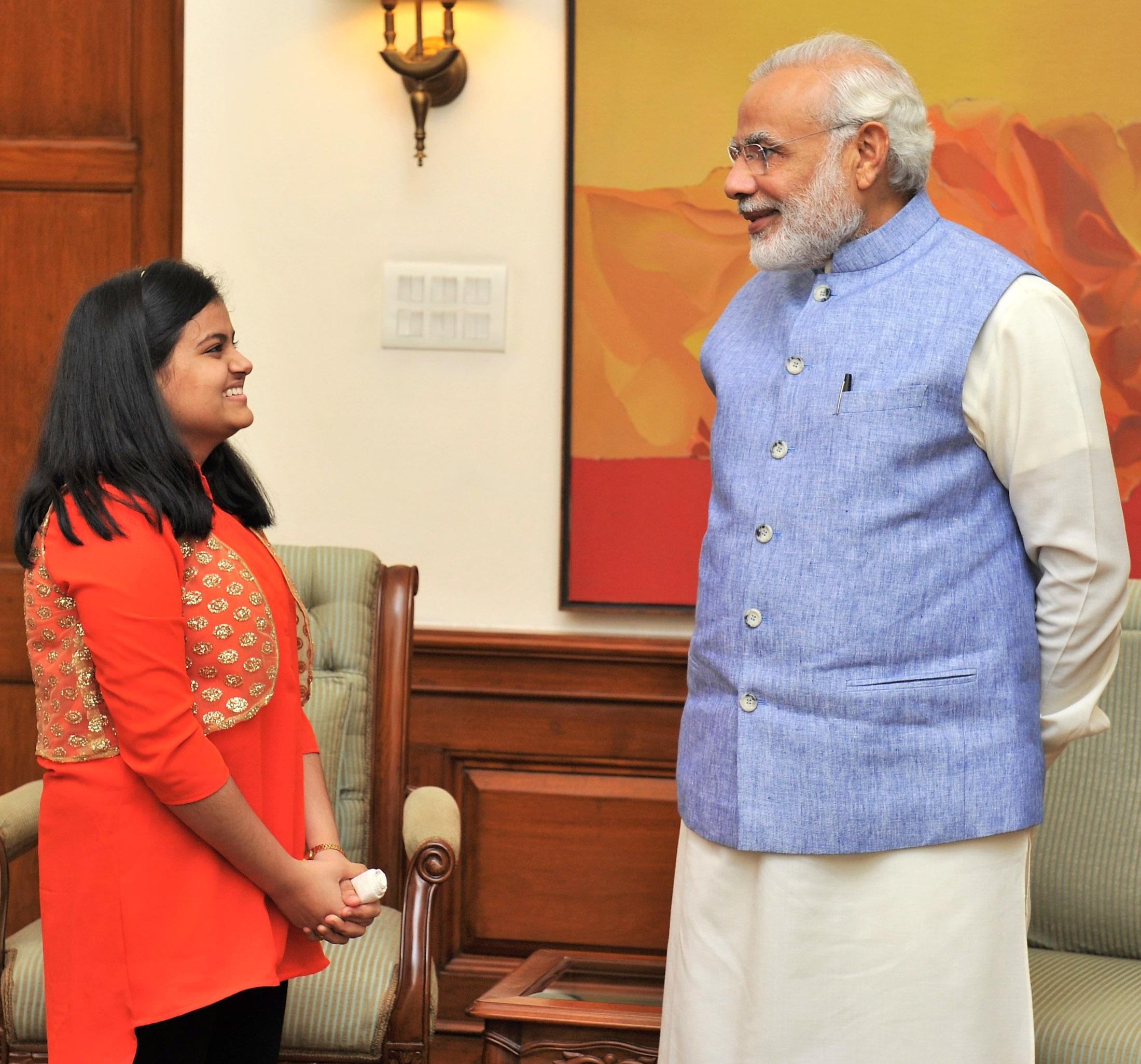
- Ananya Nanda with PM Narendra Modi

Background information
- Born: Ananya Sritam Nanda; Puri, Odisha, India
- Genres: Filmi, Pop
- Occupation: Singer
- Instrument: Vocal
- Years active: 2015–present

Ananya Sritam Nanda is an Indian playback singer. She was the winner of Indian Idol Junior Season 2.

== Early life ==
Ananya's father, Prasanna Kumar Nanda, is a director in a government industrial department and her mother, Prasanti Mishra, is a housewife. She started her study from DAV Public School, Pokhariput, Bhubaneswar.

== Career ==
Ananya won the Season 2 of Indian Idol Junior in 2015. During competing in Indian Idol Junior she got a two-year record deal with Universal Music India. After winning Indian Idol Junior, she released her debut album 'Mausam Mastana' under the Universal Music label. The song was originally sung by veteran playback singer Asha Bhosle from the 1982 movie Satte Pe Satta. The additional music and lyrics were composed and written by DJ AKS. She started as a Bollywood playback singer in film ‘M.S. Dhoni: The Untold Story’ for the music director Amaal Mallik. She is also regular playback singer for Ollywood Industry, has sung in many films like ‘Agastya’, Baby (2016 film), Kathadeli Matha Chuin. When she won the competition received calls to visit Narendra Modi, Prime Minister of India and Naveen Patnaik, Chief minister of Odisha. In 2019, she participated in Colors TV reality show Rising Star where she was in Top 5.

== Discography ==
| Year | Song(s) | Film(s) | Composer(s) | Co-singer(s) |
|---|---|---|---|---|
| 2016 | Mausam Mastana | Mausam Mastana | DJ AKS | Jusa Dementor |
| 2016 | "Padhoge Likhoge" | M.S. Dhoni: The Untold Story | Amaal Mallik | Adhityan Prithviraj |
| 2016 | "Sun Zara" "Mu Kahinki Ete" | Baby (2016 film) | Prem Anand | Humane Sagar |
| 2016 | "Dhire Dhire" "Tipi Tipi" | Agastya | Prem Anand | Humane Sagar |
| 2017 | "Tu mo love story" "Jadi Ae Jibanare" "Tike Tike Achinha" | Tu Mo Love Story | Prem Anand | Humane Sagar; Biswajit Mohapatra |
| 2017 | "Kathadeli Matha Chhuin" "Tori Hrudaye" | Kathadeli Matha Chuin | Prem Anand | Kumar Bapi |
| 2017 | "Romeo Juliet Title" "Nanhimo Pade" "Tu Kahibu ta" | Romeo Juliet | Prem Anand | Humane Sagar |
| 2017 | "Tu Mora kieki" "Rabba Rabba" | Abhaya | Prem Anand | Humane Sagar |
| 2017 | "Kabula Barabula" "Zalima zalima" "O Saiba" | Kabula Barabula | Prem Anand | Humane Sagar; Sibasis |
| 2017 | "Tu Mo hero" "Anjana Thili" | Tu Mo hero | Baidyanath Dash | Humane Sagar |
| 2023 | "Parichaya Khoje Aji" "Sakhi" | Phalguna Chaitra | | Gaurav Anand |
| 2024 | "Akha Diaan" | Pabar | Gourav Anand | Swayam Padhi |
| 2024 | "Bhabuthuli Jemiti" | Kuhudi | Somesh Satpathy | Humane Sagar |
| 2025 | "Basinda" | Charidham - A Journey Within | Somesh Satpathy | Satyajeet Jena |
| 2026 | "Mahama" | Jadi | "Somesh Satpathy" | Kuldeep Pattnaik |
