= Diptirekha Padhi =

Dipti Rekha
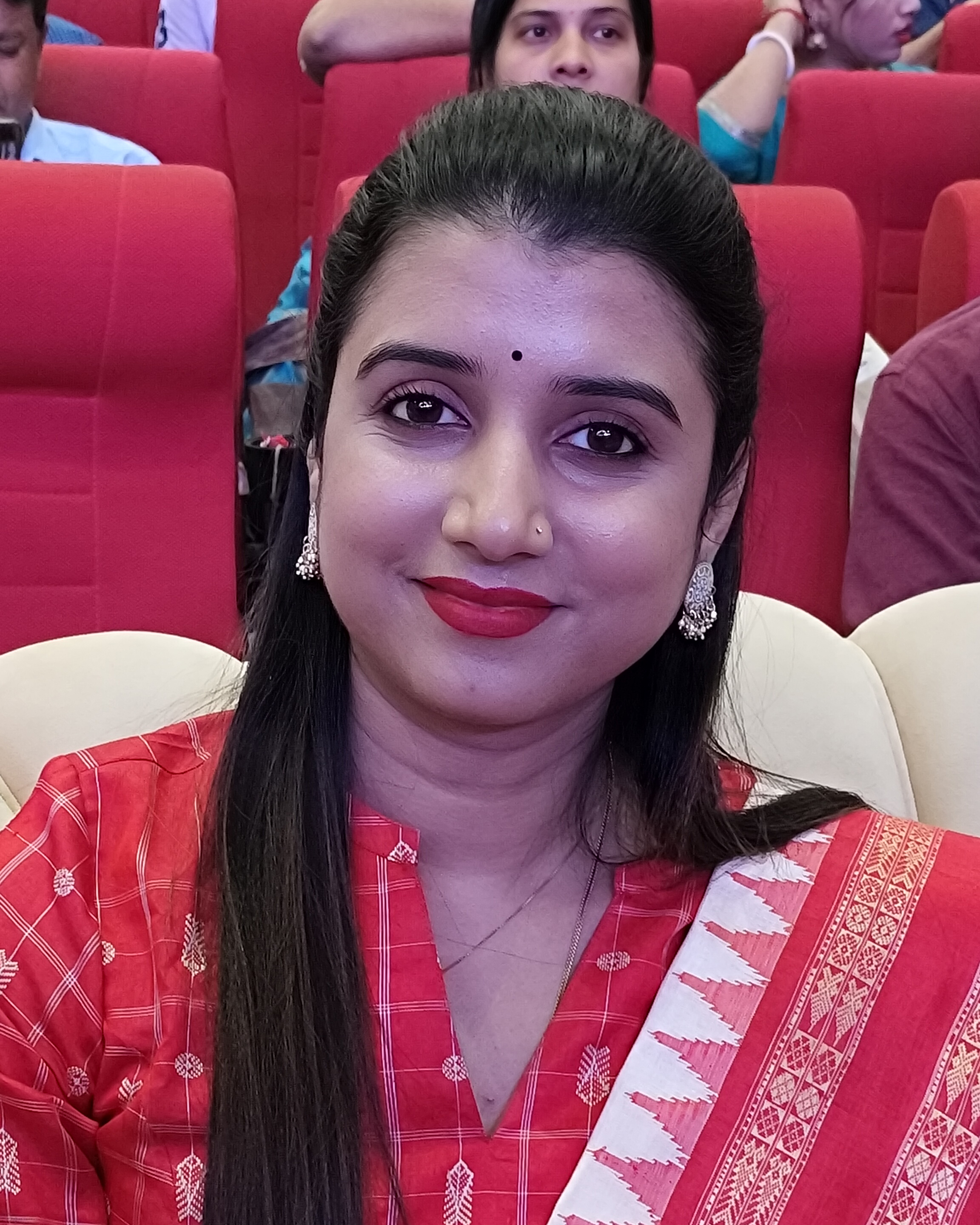
- Diptirekha Padhi at Delhi during Odisha day celebration at Delhi in 2025

Background information
- Born: Diptirekha Padhi; 17 October 1991 (age 35); Bhubaneswar, Odisha, India
- Genres: Filmi, Pop
- Occupations: Singer; actress
- Instrument: Vocals
- Years active: 2009–present

Diptirekha Padhi, also known as Dipti Rekha, is an Indian Odia playback singer and actress. In 2023, she won the 31st Odisha State Film Awards for the Best Female Playback Singer for the year 2019.

== Career ==
Diptirekha has mostly worked in many Odia language films as a playback singer since 2009. She has also acted as an actress in Tele-Serials such as Raja Kanya, where she was the lead actress. She has lent her voice in films like 4 Idiots, Tu Mo Love Story, Kabula Barabula. She has sung the theme song in voter awareness campaign "My Vote My Country: My Vote not for Sale" for the Odisha Election Watch (OEW).

She won the ninth Tarang Music award in 2017.

=== Live performances ===
- Dipti has performed live on Khandagiri Mela in Bhubaneswar on the occasion of ‘Ratha Saptami’.
- She has performed in the ‘Dola Yatra’ – the festival of colours at the lawns of India Gate in New Delhi.

== Discography ==
Year	Song(s)	Album(s)	Composer(s)	Co-singer(s)
2017	"Tu mo love story" "Jadi Ae Jibanare" "Tike Tike Achinha"	Tu Mo Love Story	Prem Anand	Humane Sagar and Biswajit Mohapatra
2017	"Tu Mo Darling"	Hero No 1	Prem Anand	Abhijit Mazumdar
2017	"Tike Tike Achinha Tu"	Tu Mo Love Story	Prem Anand	Humane Sagar
2017	""Bele Bele""	Romeo Juliet	Prem Anand	Humane Sagar
2017	"O sajana"	Kabula Barabula	Prem Anand	Humane Sagar and Sibasis
2018	"Jhumka Tike" "First Time To Pain"	Prem Kumar: Salesman of the year	Prem Anand	Ashutosh Mohanty
2018	"Bula Kukura"	Ole Ole Dil Bole	Prem Anand	Ashutosh Mohanty
2020	"Toh prema lage sa ra ra"	Toh prema lage sa ra ra	Sushil Dalai	Debesh Pati

== Filmography ==
=== Television ===
Year	Title	Role	Platform	Language	Ref.
2014–2017	Rajakanya	Purbi	ETV Odia	Odia	
2024	Sandya Ragini	Debaki	Zee Sarthak	Odia	
