= Prem Anand =

Indian music director and composer (born 1975)

- ପ୍ରେମ ଆନନ୍ଦ
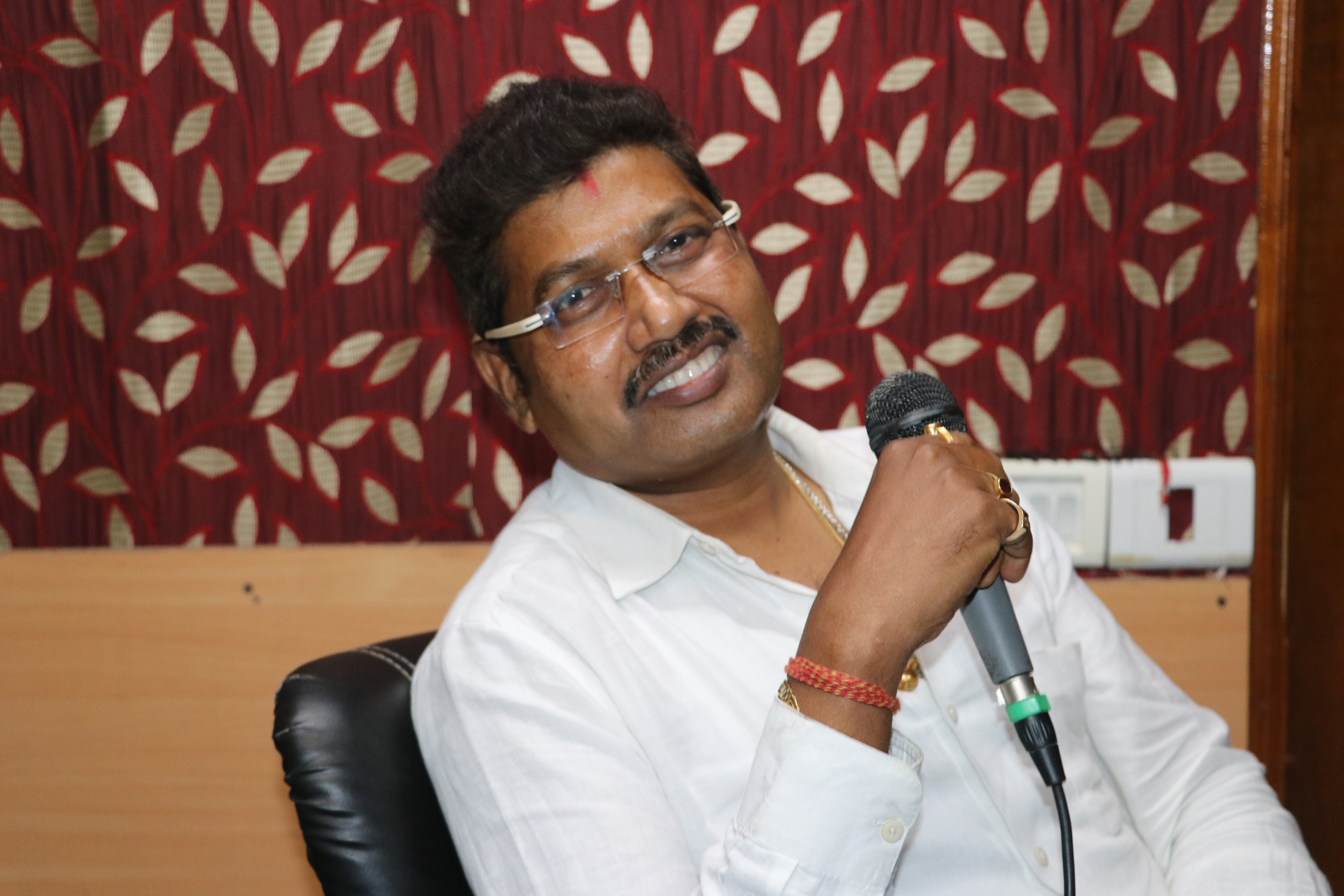
- Born: Prem Anand Samal; 23 January 1975 (age 51); Saanagaan, Kendrapara, Odisha, India
- Other name: Premanand
- Education: Utkal Sangeet Mahavidyalaya
- Occupations: Music director; composer
- Years active: 1993 – present
- Known for: Pilata Bigidigala, Abhaya, Tu Mo Love Story, Abhimanyu, Raja Jhia Sange Heigala Bhaba
- Spouse: Saswati Acharya
- Awards: Odisha State Film Awards, 2011

Prem Anand (Odia: ପ୍ରେମ ଆନନ୍ଦ) is an Indian music director and composer. He usually works in Odia film and television industry. In 2006, he started his career as a music director through the Odia movie Tu Eka Ama Saha Bharasa and worked as a music director in more than 60 Odia films. Apart from Odia films, he composed music for Odia daily shops, Bhajans and Jatra songs. In 2009, Anand worked as a music director for the Hindi film Dekha Bhai Dekh in 2019, he composed music for Bollywood film Luv U Turn. Apart from Odia and Hindi films, he composed music for Marathi and Bengali films. He composed the 2023 Men's FIH Hockey World Cup anthem.

== Early life and education ==
Anand was born on 23 January 1975 at Saanagaan in Kendrapara district of Odisha to a Hindu family. He was the middle child of the family with an elder brother and a sister. His family was against his music career since childhood, but somehow he managed to learn harmonium from his village.

After passing out from the Gopinathpur Sanskrit Vidyalaya in the early 1990s, Prem Anand joined the Utkal Sangeet Mahavidyalaya to learn music and trained himself in the Odissi. He honed his skills there under gurus like late Bhikari Bal, Gopala Chandra Panda, and Ramahari Das.

He graduated in history in 1997 from the Marshaghai College and later trained himself in Hindustani classical music. Then he joined a school in Raygada as a music teacher, but later resigned from that post and started traveling from village to village and composing for plays and small opera troupes.

== Career ==
After school, Anand was composing music for small theaters and plays, but in 1993, he got a chance to compose one song for Janani Gananaatya, one of the famous Opera companies in Odisha. There he composed a song for the play named Naalu Bhai Ra Mo Naali Gaamuchhaa. Later, he worked for many other Opera troupes like Parbati Gananaatya, Kalinga Gananatya, Tulasi Ganantya, Gouri Gananatya, Trinaatha Gananaatya, Shivani Ganantya, Tarapur Opera, and Indrabhubana Gananaatya.

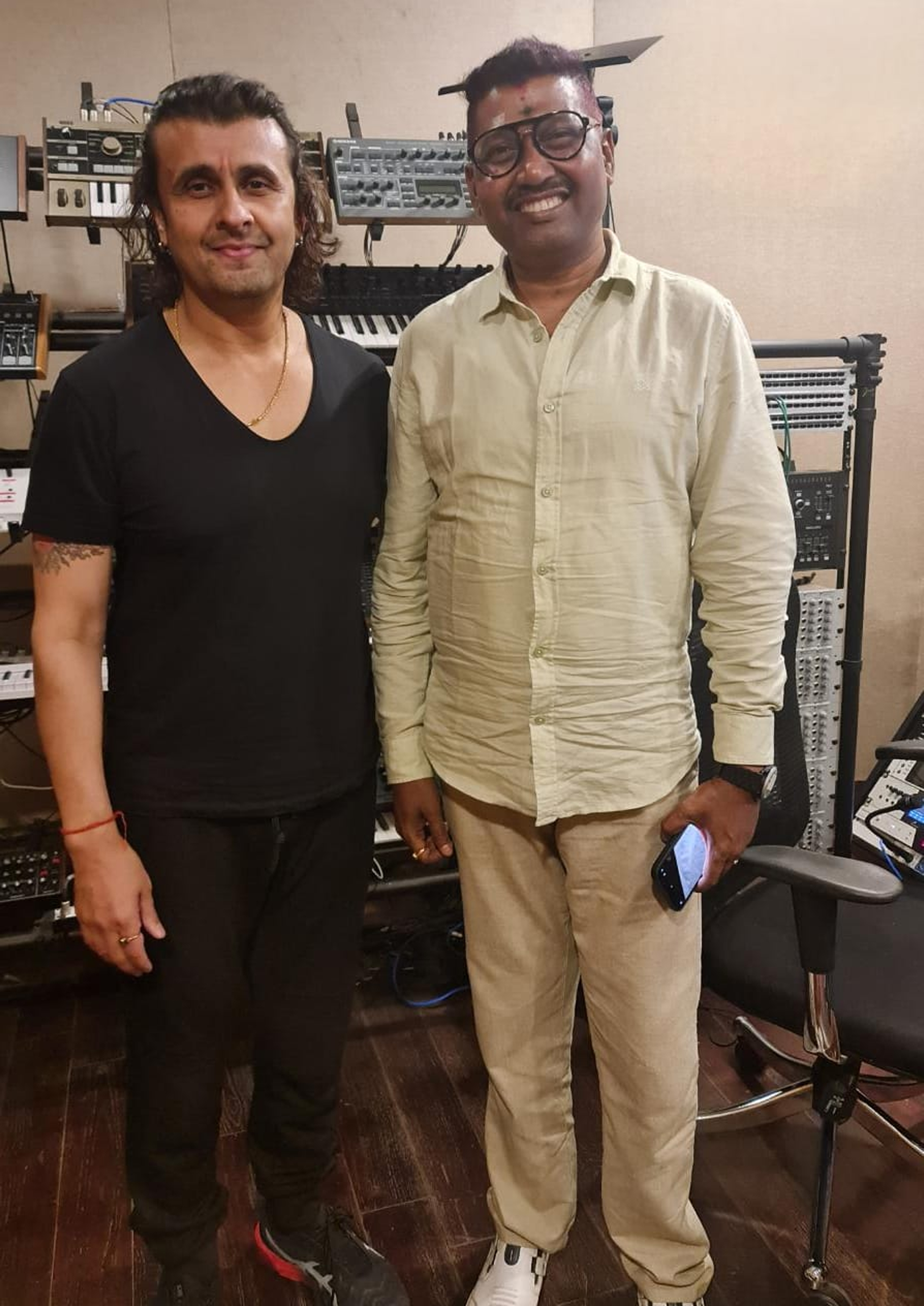
Prem Anand with Sonu Nigam

In 1996 his 1st album Maa Gojabayani was released which is a devotional song. Later his album Anamika Nayika under Sarthak Music had made him famous. He has composed more than 200 Odia albums. Some of his popular albums are Janha Re, Hey Priyatama, Manini, Kanya Kumari, Malliphula Gajara, Shila I Love You, Michhei Jhia, Lotani Para, Tu Besi Paduchu Mane, Nali Tikili, Rangani Phula, Premi and Sei Jhiati.

In 2005 he got a chance to work in the Odia film industry as a music director. His first Odia movie was Tu Eka Ama Saha Bharasa starring Siddhanta Mahapatra, Jyoti Mishra, and Mihir Das in the lead role. This film was released in 2006. Later he worked for more than 60 Odia films like Rasika Nagara, Love dot Com, Aailare Odia Pua, Chandini I Miss You, Hata Dahri Chalutha, Something Something 2, Gapa Hele bi Sata, Agastya, Kabula Barabula, Happy Lucky, Prem Kumar: Salesman of the year, Nimki and Biju Babu.

In 2009 Anand worked as a music composer in a Hindi film Dekh Bhai Dekh. In 2019 he composed another song for Bollywood film Luv U Turn.

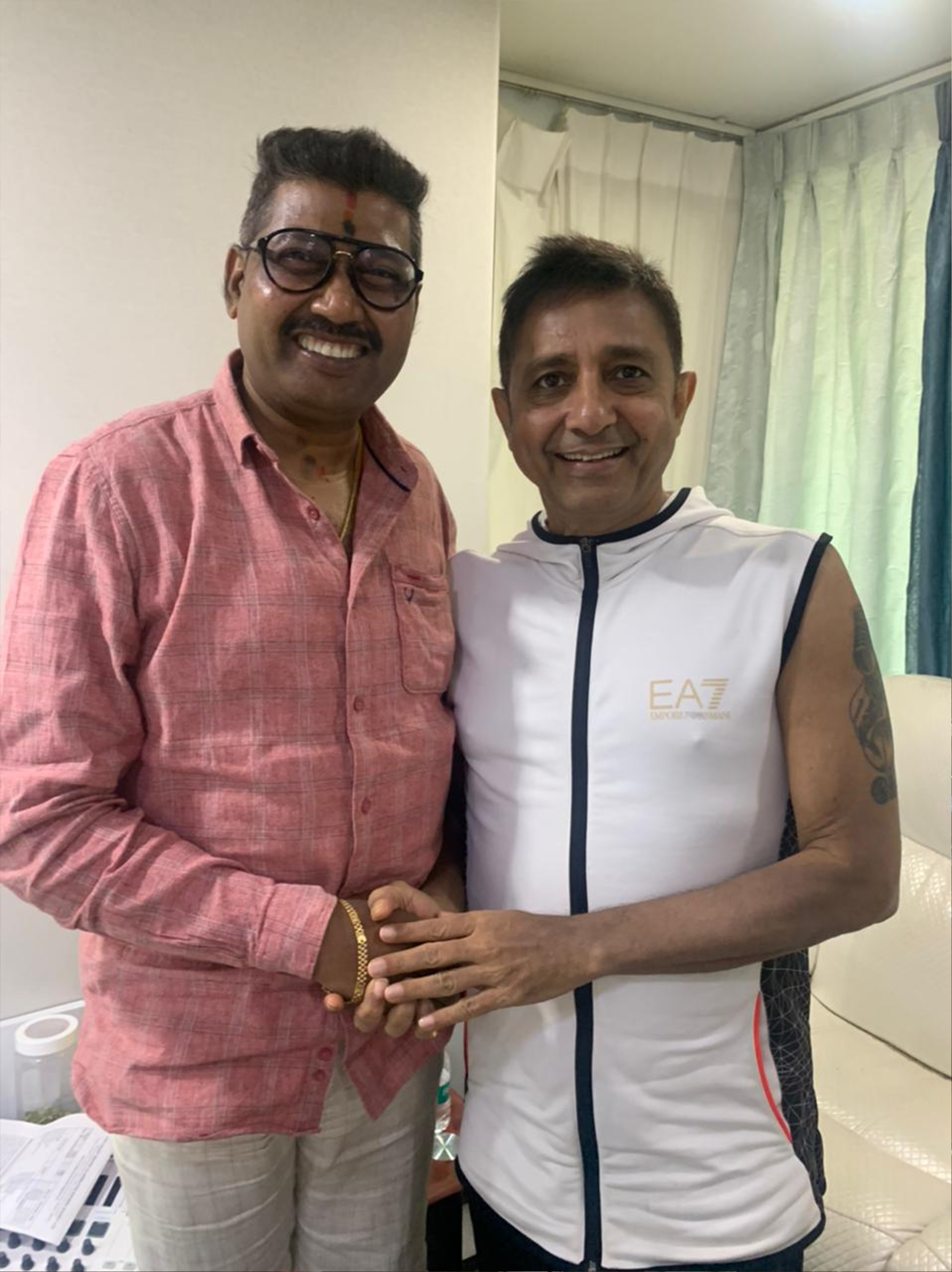
Prem Anand with Sukhwinder Singh

Anand composed music for some Odia daily shops like Nua Bohu, Sankha Sindura, Swabhima for Tarang TV, To Pain Mun, Samparka Hrudayara, Jibana Satha for Zee Sarthak. Ahuti for ETV Odia, Khusi for DD Odia and Abhinetri for Zee Kalinga. Apart from serials, he has composed music for shows like Srimati Kam Nuhanti, Sampurna, Chal Pherijiba Gaon ku.

He also worked as a judge some Odia musical reality shows. He judged Amari Swara on ETV Odia in 2008 along with Tansen Singh and Nijam. Later he judged Zee Sarthak's musical reality shows Sa Re Ga Ma Pa Swara Ra Mahamancha and Sa Re Ga Ma Pa Little Champs.

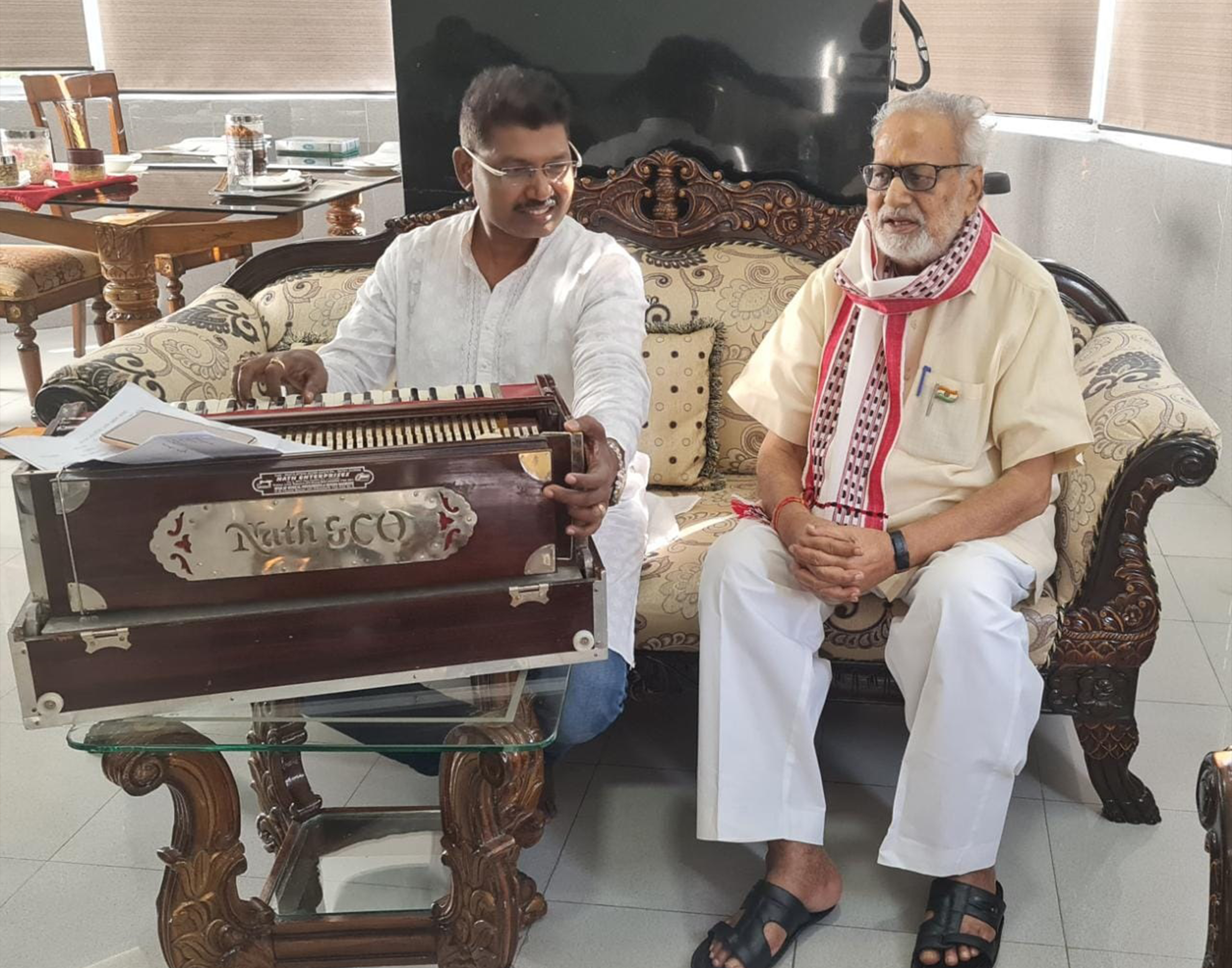
Governor Ganeshi Lal with Premanand during Ae maati Odisha, ae jaati song recording.

A patriotic song titled Ae maati Odisha, ae jaati Odia was released on 1 April 2021 in the occasion of Utkla Dibasa. Fifteen popular singers contributed their voice to that song along with the Chief Minister Odisha, Naveen Patnaik and Governor of Odisha, Ganeshi Lal. Governor personally visited the studio to lend his voice for this song.

In 2021, Premanand has composed the music for Odia TV Series Srimandira based on Kanchi Abhiyan of Purushottama Deva starring Buddhaditya Mohanty. The title track was composed with the A cappella music format and 15 than 15 singers has sung this song. A cappella was for the 1st time in the Odia musical industry.

He composed the 2023 Men's FIH Hockey World Cup anthem named Jai Ho Hindustan Ki. This was written by Sameer Anjaan and sung by Sukhvinder Singh. In early 2024, during the 2024 Indian General Election, he worked the BJP election campaign video named, Phir Aayega Modi.

== Personal life ==
Premanand is married to Saswati Acharya, a software engineer by profession. This couple has two sons.

== Filmography ==
| Year | Name | Note(s) |
|---|---|---|
| 2024 | Tike tike Achinha | Odia |
| 2024 | Ashiq Surrender Hela | Odia |
| 2023 | Tu Sei Nilanayana | Odia |
| 2022 | Titli | Odia |
| 2022 | Tora Mora Kati | Odia |
| 2022 | Mahabahu | Odia |
| 2022 | Rudrani | Odia |
| 2022 | Oye Anjali | Odia |
| 2022 | Dil Mora Manena | Odia |
| 2021 | Bijayini | Odia |
| 2020 | Tike Love Tike Twist | Odia |
| 2019 | Luv U Turn | Hindi |
| 2019 | From Me To You | Odia |
| 2019 | Chhabirani | Odia |
| 2019 | Tu Mo Lovestory 2 | Odia |
| 2019 | Biju Babu | Odia |
| 2019 | Nimki | Odia |
| 2019 | Ajab Sanju Ra Gajab Love | Odia |
| 2019 | Saathi tu Feria | Odia |
| 2018 | Prem Kumar: Salesman of the year | Odia |
| 2018 | Ishq Puni Thare | Odia |
| 2018 | BlackMail | Odia |
| 2018 | 4 Idiots | Odia |
| 2018 | Love Promise | Odia |
| 2018 | Ole Ole Dil Bole | Odia |
| 2018 | Dipu, The Dance Boy | Odia |
| 2018 | Happy Lucky | Odia |
| 2017 | Bajrangi | Odia |
| 2017 | Shiba not Out | Odia |
| 2017 | Kabula Barabula | Odia |
| 2017 | Romeo Juliet | Odia |
| 2017 | Abhaya | Odia |
| 2017 | Tu Mo Love Story | Odia |
| 2017 | Katha deli Matha Chhuin | Odia |
| 2016 | Baby | Odia |
| 2016 | Bhaina Kana Kala Se | Odia |
| 2016 | Jhiata Bigidi gala | Odia |
| 2016 | Agastya | Odia |
| 2016 | Hela Mate Prema Jara | Odia |
| 2016 | Gote Sua Gote Sari | Odia |
| 2015 | Shortcut | Marathi |
| 2015 | Galpa Nuhe Alpa Dina ra | Odia |
| 2015 | Jaga Hatare Pagha | Odia |
| 2015 | Pilata Bigidigala | Odia |
| 2015 | Love You Hamesha | Odia |
| 2015 | Gapa Hele bi Sata | Odia |
| 2014 | Tame Thiile Saathire | Odia |
| 2014 | Mental | Odia |
| 2014 | Something Something 2 | Odia |
| 2014 | To Bata Chahinchi Rati Sara | Odia |
| 2014 | Tu Mo Dehara Chhai | Odia |
| 2013 | Mita Basichhi Mun Bhuta Sathire | Odia |
| 2013 | Gadbad | Odia |
| 2013 | Bachelor | Odia |
| 2013 | Hata Dahri Chalutha | Odia |
| 2013 | Paribeni kehi alaga kari | Odia |
| 2012 | Chanda Na Tame tara | Odia |
| 2012 | Raja jhia sanghe hei gala bhaba | Odia |
| 2012 | Something Something | Odia |
| 2011 | Katak | Odia |
| 2011 | Chandini I Miss You | Odia |
| 2011 | Hi Darling | Odia |
| 2011 | Kemiti E Bandhana | Odia |
| 2011 | Prem Weds Priya | Odia |
| 2010 | Tate Bhala Pauchi Boli | Odia |
| 2010 | Aalo Mora Kandhei | Odia |
| 2010 | Pagal Karichhi Paunji Tora | Odia |
| 2009 | Dekh Bhai Dekh | Hindi |
| 2009 | Love dot com | Odia |
| 2009 | Abhimanyu | Odia |
| 2009 | Aailare Odia Pua | Odia |
| 2009 | Dhire Dhire Prema Hela | Odia |
| 2009 | Tu Mori Paiin | Odia |
| 2007 | Rasika Nagara | Odia |
| 2006 | I Love my India | Odia |
| 2006 | Tu Eka Ama Saha Bharasa | Odia |

== Awards ==
- Odisha State Film Awards for Chandini I Miss You in 2011
- Odisha Excellence Award in 2018
- Odia Filmfare Awards for Gapa Hele bi Sata in 2016, Baby in 2017, Tu Mo Love Story 2 in 2019
- Tarang Cine Awards for Chandini I Miss You in 2012 and Gapa hele bi Sata in 2016.
