= Odisha State Film Awards =

Odisha State Film Awards. Department of Culture of the Government of Odisha

- Awarded for: Excellence in cinematic achievements
- Country: India
- Presented by: Department of Culture, Government of Odisha
- First award: 1973

The Odisha State Film Awards have been conferred by the Department of Culture of the Government of Odisha, India.

The awards were initiated in 1968. The awards are decided by independent juries formed by the Department of Culture. The jury usually consists of eminent personalities from the film fraternity, academic, journalist and public servants.

Nine new awards were introduced in 2012: five for tribal language films, best dialogue writer, best costumer, best make-up artist, and best choreographer.

In 2023, the awards ceremonies for the years 2020, 2021, and 2022 were held with modifications to the rules instituted in 2010.

== Lists of awardees ==
=== Mohan Sunder Dev Goswami Award ===
The Mohan Sunder Dev Goswami Award (earlier known as Jayadev Award) is a special award given to a film personality for outstanding contribution to the growth and development of Odia cinema.

Year	Winners	Notes	Ref.
1980	Dhira Biswal	Special Award	
1981	Krushna Chandra Tripathy		
1982	Nitai Palit		
1984	Samuel Sahu		
1985	Sarat Pujari		
1986	Govind Tej		
1987	Parvati Ghosh		
1988	Balakrushna Dash		
1989	Bhubaneswar Misra		
1990	Priyanath Mishra		
1991	Hemant Das		
1992	Gloria Mohanty		
1993	Bymokesh Tripathy	Posthumously	
1994	Dukhiram Swain	Posthumously	
1995	Sujata Anand	Posthumously	
1996	Akshaya Mohanty		
1997	Jharana Das		
1998	Prasant Nanda		
1999	Uttam Mohanty		
2000	Manimala Devi		
2001	Manmohan Mahapatra		
2002	Basant Nayak		
2003	Bhanumati Devi		
2004	Prafulla Kar		
2005	Sisir Misra		
2006	Surendra Sahoo		
2007	Rama Chandra Pratihari		
2008	Sadhu Meher		
2009	Mahasweta Ray		
2010	Apurba Kishore Bir		
2011	Sriram Panda		
2012	Raju Mishra		
2013	Sarada Prasana Nayak		
2014	Bijay Mohanty		
2015	Ashok Swain		
2016	Pranab Patnaik		
2017	Ravi Shankar Patnaik		
2018	Bijay Mishra		
2019	Ghanashyam Mohapatra		
2020	Ananta Mohapatra		
2021	Srinivas Mohapatra		
2022	Jayeeram Samal		
2023	Shyamalendu Bhattacharya		
2024	Namrata Das		

=== Odisha State Film Award for Best Film ===
Year	Film	Producer	Director	Ref.
1973	Adina Megha	Babulal Doshi	Amit Mitra	
1974	Dharitri	Dhira Biswal	Nitai Palit	
1975	Mamata	Prafulla Kumar Mishra; Ramesh Vaisinka	Byomokesh Tripaty	
1976	Shesha Shrabana	Shree Jagannath films	Prashant Nanda	
1977	Bandhu Mohanty	Dhiren Pattanayak	Nitai Palit	
1978	Balidan	United Production	Prashant Nanda	
1979	Mathura Bijay	Babulal Doshi	A. Sanjeevi	
1980	Tapasya	Biswanath Mishra	Nagen Roy	
1981	Pooja	Maa Samali Films	Prashant Nanda	
1982	Phoola Chandan	Bata Krushna Nayak	Manmohan Mahapatra	
1983	Maya Miriga	Nirad Mohapatra		
1984	Kaberi	Nagen Sahu	Govind Tej	
1985	Hakima Babu	Amiya Patanaik	Pranab Das	
1986	Trisandhya	Jyoti Das	Manmohan Mahapatra	
1987	Tunda Baida	Nagen Sahu	Govind Tej	
1988	Kichhi Smruti Kichhi Anubhuti	Manmohan Mahapatra		
1989	Andha Diganta	Manmohan Mahapatra		
1990	Agnee Veena	Manmohan Mahapatra		
1991	Adi Mimansa	Apurba Kishore Bir		
1992	Agni Sankat	D. Mohapatra	Shantanu Mishra	
1993	Indradhanura Chhai	Jugal Debata	Sushant Misra	
1994	Lubai Dak	Sushant Adhikari	Padmalochan Das; Ashok Mishra	
1995	Mokhya	P. Nayak; J. Mallick	G.K. Dash; M. Ray	
1996	Sunya Swaroop	Ajay Mohanty	Himansu Khatua	
1997	Ahalya	Arati Rout	Bijay Ketan Mishra	
1998	Bou	Falcon Movies	Sabyasachi Mahapatra	
1999	Maa O Mamata	Jyoti Prakash Debata		
2000	Gare Sindur Dhare Luha	Nagen Sahu	Gobind Tej	
2001	Laxmi Ra Abhisara	Hariram Agarwal; Laxmi Narayan Agarwal	Raju Mishra	
2002	Muhurta	Sakuntala Ray	Manmohan Mahapatra	
2003	Aw Aaakare Aa	Subas Das		
2004	Om Santi Om	Prashant Nanda		
2005	Kathantara	Iti Samanta	Himansu Khatua	
2006	Puja Pain Phulatie	Padmini Puty	Gadadhar Puty	
2007	Dhauli Express	Chittaranjan Tripathy		
2008	Jianta Bhoota	Akshay Kumar Parija	Prashant Nanda	
2009	Saata Sure Bandha E Jibana	Dilip Das; Manmath Mishra	Apu Kanungo	
2010	Swayamsiddha	Sudhansu Sahu	Prabhat Ranjan Mallik	
2011	Eka Eka	Subas Das		
2012	-Not awarded-			
2013	Sala Budha	Chintu B. Mohapatra	Sabyasachi Mohapatra	
2014	Krantidhara	Iti Samanta	Himanshu Khatua	
2015	Kehi Nuhen Kahara	Akshaya Kumar Parija	Sushant Mani	
2016	Chini	Bhabani Majhi; Snehalata Parida	Pradeep Bhol	
2017	Hello Arsi	Ajay Rautray	Sambit Mohanty	
2018	Bhija Matira Swarga	Akshay Kumar Parija	Manmohan Mahapatra	
2019	Kalira Atita	Nila Madhab Panda		
2020	Sahid Raghu Sardar	Dr. Biswanath Pattnaik	Rajeeb Mohanty	
2021	Pratikshya	Anupam Patnaik		
2021	Daalcheeni	Atish Kumar Rout	Sisir Kumar Sahu; Peenakee Singh	
2022	DAMaN	Deependra Samal	Debi Prasad Lenka; Vishal Mourya	
2023	My Sweet Housewife	Pritiraj Satpathy; Naina Das Tiwari; Mystic Claw Claps	Sisir Kumar Sahu; Peenakee Singh	
2023	Pushkara	Tarang Cine Productions	Subhransu Das	
2024	Ashram	Aneesh Entertainment; Tapan Kumar Das	Sudhanshu Mohan Sahoo	

=== Odisha State Film Award for Best Documentary ===
Year	Film	Producer	Director	Ref.
1973	Radhu-O-Shyam	Ghanashyam Mohapatra		
1974	Maa-O-Sishu	Ghanashyam Mohapatra		
1984	Krushi Jantrapati	Ghanashyam Mohapatra		
1991	Pragati Pathe Bidut sakati	Government of Odisha		
1992	Gana Kabi Baisnab Pani	Government of Odisha		
2010	-No Selection-			
2011				
2012	-No Selection-			
2013	The Tale of Kolhar	Manorama Sahu	Manas Sahu	
2014	-Not awarded-			
2015	X	X	X	
2016	X	X	X	
2017	X	X	X	
2018	X	X	X	
2019	X	X	X	
2020	Mask (short film)	Nila Mahapatra	Dr. Sweta Kumar Das	
2021	The Healing Touch (short film)	Nila Mahapatra	Dr. Sweta Kumar Das	
2021	The Mountain Hockey	Raj Kishore Hota	Debashis Mahapatra; Abhinash Pradhan	
2022	Manayun: My Wonderland	Shantanu Mishra	Pranab Kumar Aich	

=== Odisha State Film Award for Best Director ===
Year	Film	Director	Ref.
1973	Bandhan	Nitai Palit	
1974	Dharitri	Nitai Palit	
1974	Mana Akasha	Nitai Palit	
1975	Mamata	Byomokesh Tripaty	
1976	Shesha Shrabana	Prasant Nanda	
1977	Bandhu Mohanty	Nitai Palit	
1978	Gouri	Dhira Biswal	
1979	Chinha Acinha	Kumar Ananda	
1980	Maa O Mamata	Prasanta Nanda	
1981	Pooja	Prasanta Nanda	
1982	Phula Chandan	Manmohan Mahapatra	
1983	Maya Miriga	Nirod Mohaptra	
1984	Kaberi	Govind Tej	
1985	School Master	Govind Tej	
1986	Trisandhya	Manmohan Mahapatra	
1987	Tunda Baida	Govind Tej	
1988	Kichhi Smruti Kichhi Anubhuti	Manmohan Mahapatra	
1989	Andha Diganta	Manmohan Mahapatra	
1990	Agnee Veena	Manmohan Mahapatra	
1991	Adi Mimansa	Apurba Kishore Bir	
1992	Agnee Sanket	Pranab Das	
1993	Indradhanura Chhai	Sushant Misra	
1994	Lubeidak	Padmalochan Das; Ashok Mishra	
1995	Mokhya	G.K. Dash; Malati Ray	
1996	Sunya Swarupa	Himansu Khatua	
1997	Ahalya	Bijoy Ketan Mishra	
1998	Bou	Sabyasachi Mahapatra	
1999	Maa O Mamata	Jyoti Prakash Debata	
2000	Gare Sindur Dhare Luha	Govind Tej	
2001	Laxmi Ra Abhisar	Raju Misra	
2002	Pua Mora Jagatjita	Sanak Debata	
2003	Aw Aaakare Aa	Subas Das	
2004	Om Santi Om	Prashant Nanda	
2005	Kathantara	Himansu Khatua	
2006	Puja Pain Phulatie	Gadadhar Puty	
2007	Tumaku Paruni Ta Bhuli	Chakradhar Sahu	
2008	Jianta Bhoota	Prashant Nanda	
2009	Paagala Karichi Paunji Tora	Sanjay Nayak	
2010	Swayamsiddha	Sudhansu Sahu	
2011	Thukul	Prashant Nanda	
2012	-Not awarded-		
2013	Sala Budha	Sabyasachi Mohapatra	
2014	Aadim Vichar	Sabyasachi Mohapatra	
2015	Tulasi Apa	Amiya Patnaik	
2016	Namard	Ajaya Rath	
2017	Hello Arsi	Sambit Mohanty	
2018			
2019	Kalira Atita	Nila Madhab Panda	
2020	Romeo Raja	Rakesh Samal	
2021	Trushna	Suresh Patnaik	
2022	Mayabi	Sudhanshu Mohan Sahoo	
2023	My Sweet Housewife	Shishir Kumar Sahu; Pinaki Singh	
2024	Pabar	Ashok Pati	

=== Odisha State Film Award for Best Actor ===
Year	Film	Actor	Ref.
1973	Bandhan	Samuel Sahu	
1974	Ghara Sansara	Sarat Pujari	
1974	Mana Akasha	Prasant Nanda	
1975	Mamata	Prasant Nanda	
1976	Shesha Shrabana	Prasant Nanda	
1977	Bandhu Mohanty	Govind Tej	
1978	Gouri	Prasant Nanda	
1979	Neela Madhab	Ramachandra Pratihari	
1980	Tapasya	Sarat Pujari	
1981	Aarati	Bijay Mohanty	
1982	Phula Chandan	Uttam Mohanty	
1983	Jheeati Sita Pari	Uttam Mohanty	
1984	Danda Balunga	Uttam Mohanty	
1985	Hakim Babu	Ajit Das	
1986	Ei Aama Sansar	Bijay Mohanty	
1987	Badhu Nirupama	Sriram Panda	
1988	Suna Chadhei	Uttam Mohanty	
1989	Andha Diganta	Arun Nanda	
1990	Mukti Mashal	Ashrumochan Mohanty	
1991	Adi Mimansa	Lalatendu Rath	
1992	Bhina Samaya	Saroj Patnaik	
1993	Bhisma Pratingya	Bijay Mohanty	
1994	Bhai Hela Bhagari	Bijay Mohanty	
1995	Mana Ra Murchana	Arun Mohanty	
1996	Pua Mora Bhola Sankara	Mihir Das	
1997	Doora Digant	Arun Mohanty	
1998	Bou	Bijay Mohanty	
1999	Vidhata	Mihir Das	
2000	Sindura Nuhe Khela Ghara	Sidhant Mohapatra	
2001	Mo Kola To Jhulana	Sidhant Mohapatra	
2002	Pua Mora Jagatjita	Sidhant Mohapatra	
2003	Aethi Swarga Aithi Narka	Sidhant Mohapatra	
2004	Om Santi Om	Sidhant Mohapatra	
2005	Shaashu Ghara Chaalijibi	Sidhant Mohapatra	
2006	Pheria Mo Suna Bhauni	Mihir Das	
2007	Pagala Premi	Sabyasachi Mishra	
2008	Kalinga Putra	Akash Das Nayak	
2009	Akashe Ki Ranga Lagila	Anubhav Mohanty	
2010	Prema Adhei Akhyara	Babushaan Mohanty	
2011	Eka Eka	Sidhant Mohapatra	
2012	Emiti Bi Prema Hue	Sabyasachi Mishra	
2013	Sala Budha	Atal Bihari Panda	
2014	Aadim Vichar	Atal Bihari Panda	
2015	Antarleena	Soumya Ranjan Das	
2016	Namard	Samaresh Routray	
2017	Hello Arsi	Partha Sarathi Ray	
2018	Bhija Matira Swarga	Mihir Das	
2019	Kalira Atita	Pitobash Tripathy	
2020	Sahid Raghu Sardar	Debasish Patra	
2021	Bhoka	Ankit Kumar	
2021	Romeo Raja	Amlan Das	
2022	DAMaN	Babushaan Mohanty	
2022	Pratikshya	Dipanwit Dashmohapatra	
2023	Dho Re Babu Dho	Harihara Mahapatra	
2024	Pabar	Babushaan Mohanty	

=== Odisha State Film Award for Best Actress ===
Year	Film	Actress	Ref.
1973	Adina Megha	Jharana Das	
1974	Mana Akasha	Sujata Ananad	
1975	Jajabara	Banaja Mohanty	
1976	Gapa Hele Bi Sata	Banaja Mohanty	
1977	Mukti	Anima Pedin	
1978	Gouri	Mahasweta Ray	
1979	Chinha Achinha	Sujata Ananad	
1980	Tapasya	Anita Das	
1981	Pooja	Mahasweta Ray	
1982	Phula Chandan	Aparajita Mohanty	
1983	Bhakta Salabeg	Anita Das	
1984	Kaberi	Mahasweta Ray	
1985	Hakim Babu	Jaya Swami	
1986	Bhanga Silata	Manjula Kunwar	
1987	Tunda Baida	Aparajita Mohanty	
1988	Jahaku Rakhibe Ananta	Aparajita Mohanty	
1989	Sasti	Aparajita Mohanty	
1990	Daiba Daudi	Rekha Rao	
1991	To Binu Any Gati Nahin	Mahasweta Ray	
1992	Agni Sankat	Gayatri Chand	
1993	Asha	Aparajita Mohanty	
1994	Akuha Katha	Mahasweta Ray	
1995	X	X	
1996	Laxman Rekha	Aparajita Mohanty	
1997	Ahalya	Tanuja Nayak	
1998	Bou	Mahasweta Ray	
1999	Maa O Mamata	Anushree	
2000	Gare Sindur Dhare Luha	Anu Choudhury	
2001	Mo Kola To Jhulana	Rachana Banerjee	
2002	Rakhi Bandili Mo Rakhib Mana	Anu Choudhury	
2003	Sabat Maa	Mahasweta Ray	
2004	Om Santi Om	Anu Choudhury	
2005	Shaashu Ghara Chaalijibi	Anu Choudhury	
2006	Pheria Mo Suna Bhauni	Jeena Samal	
2007	Tumaku Paruni Ta Bhuli	Ameli Panda	
2008	Kalinga Putra	Ralli Nanda	
2009	Paagala Karichi Paunji Tora	Archita Sahu	
2010	Prema Adhei Akhyara	Riya Dey	
2011	Chocolate	Archita Sahu	
2012	Prema Sabuthu Balban	Barsha Priyadarshini	
2013	A.C.P. Sagarika	Archita Sahu	
2014	Krantidhara	Gargi Mohanty	
2015	Tulasi Apa	Barsha Nayak	
2016	Mimansa	Sushree Sangita Mohapatra (Lipi)	
2017	Laila o Laila	Sunmeera Nagesh	
2018	Champion	Archita Sahu	
2019	Babu Bhaijaan	Sivani Sangita Sarangi	
2020	Sahid Raghu Sardar	Kabya Kiran Shukla	
2021	Dalchini	Suryamayee Mohapatra	
2022	Boura Hatabaksa	Lopamudra Mishra	
2023	My Sweet Housewife	Naina Dash	
2023	Pushkara	Supriya Nayak	
2024	Bhagia Bharija	Debjani Dehury	

=== Odisha State Film Award for Best supporting Actor ===
Year	Film	Actor	Ref.
1980	Maa O Mamata	Hemant Das	
1981	Pooja	Priyanath Mishra	
1982	Samaya Bada Balaban	Sisir Mishra	
1983	Bhakta Salabeg	Biren Routray	
1984	Danda Balunga	Hemant Das	
1985	Mamata Mage Mula	Bijay Mohanty	
1986	Bhanga Silata	Basanta Samal	
1987	Bhuli Huena	Dukhiram Swain	
1988	Suna Chadhei	Debu Bose	
1989	Pratosodh Aparadh Nuhen	Bijay Mohanty	
1990	Mukti Mashal	Bhaskar Muduli	
1991	To Binu Anya Gati Nahin	Uttam Mohanty	
1992	Bhina Samaya	Sachidananda Rath	
1993	Asha	Choudhury Jayprakash Das	
1994	Lakhya Siva Puji Paichi Pua	Narayan Pati	
1995	Sae Jhiati	Premanjan Parida	
1996	Nila Masterani	B. Das	
1997	Soubhagyabati	Mihir Das	
1998	Laxmi Pratima	Mihir Das	
1998	Bou	Sidhant Mohapatra	
1999	Maa O Mamata	Suresh Bal	
2000	Maa Pari Kia Heba	Biraja Das	
2001	Laxmi Ra Abhisar	Boby Mishra	
2002	Rakshi Bandili Mo Rakhib Mana	Mihir Das	
2003	Sabat Maa	Deepak Parida	
2004	Om Santi Om	Minaketan Das	
2005	Kathantara	Bhakta Prahalad Pattnaik (Hadu)	
2006	Prema Rutu Asilare	Arindam Roy	
2007	Tumaku Paruni Ta Bhuli	Monaj Misra	
2007	Rasika Naagar	Boby Mishra	
2008	Satyameb Jayete	Bijay Mohanty	
2009	Abhimanyu	Mihir Das	
2010	Prema Adhei Akhyara	Mihir Das	
2011	Thukul	Minaketan Das	
2012	Emiti Bi Prema Hue	Ashrumochan Mahanty	
2013	Bachelor	Ashok Das	
2014	Suka Asuchi	Pritiraj Satapathy	
2015	Ishq Tu Hi Tu	Samaresh Routrai	
2016	Mimansa	Minaketan Das	
2017	Mu Khanti Odia Jhia	Manoj Patnaik	
2018			
2019			
2020	Romeo Raja	Gyanendra Kumar Pallai	
2021	Trushna	Samaresh Routray	
2021	Ajati	Samaresh Routray	
2022			
2023	Phalguna Chaitra	Choudhury Jayaprakash Das	
2024	Trikanya	Sukanta Rath	

=== Odisha State Film Award for Best supporting Actress ===
Year	Film	Actress	Ref.
1980	Tapasya	Deepa Sahu	
1981	Ulka	Gloria Mohanty	
1982	Samaya Bada Balaban	Jharana Das	
1983	Ashar Akas	Jaya Swami	
1984	Jaga Balia	Bijaya Jena	
1985	School Master	Sujata Anand	
1986	Ei Ama Sansar	Sujata Anand	
1987	Eai Ta Dunia	Anita Das	
1988	Papa Punya	Sangita Das	
1989	Sasti	Deepti Panda	
1990	Agni Veena	Jaya Swami	
1991	Ama Ghara Ama Sansar	Isha Bebarta	
1992	Agni Sankat	Laxmi Devi	
1993	Indradhanura Chhai	Sonia Mohapatra	
1994	Sagar Ganga	Sujata Anand	
1995	X	X	
1996	Laxman Rekha	Sangita Das	
1997	Doora Diganta	Bina Singh	
1998	Laxmi Pratima	Namrata Das	
1999	Pabitra Badhan	Smita Mahanty	
2000	Maa Pari Kia Heba	Aparajita Mohanty	
2001	Dharma Sahile Hela	Sadhana Das	
2002	To Akhni Mo Aina	Mama Mishra	
2003	Aw Aaakare Aa	Deepti Panda	
2004	Om Santi Om	Madhumita Mohanty	
2005	Kathantara	Bhaswati Basu	
2006	Babu I Love You	Archita Sahu	
2007	Pagala Premi	Debjani	
2007	Chaka Chaka Bhunari	Kajal Mishra	
2008	Hasiba Puni Mo Suna Sansar	Aparajita Mohanty	
2009	Suna Chadhei Mo Rupa Chadhei	Madhusmita	
2010	Tu Tha Mu Jauchi Rushi	Usasi Misra	
2011	Mote Bohu Kari Nei Jaa	Aparajita Mohanty	
2012	Tu Mo Suna tu Mo Hira	Pushpa Panda	
2013	Rumku Jhumana	Runu Parija	
2014	Aadim Vichar	Lochani Bag	
2015	Ishq Tu Hi Tu	Priyanka Mahapatra	
2016	Dele Dhara Katha Sare	Mahasweta Roy	
2017	Mu khanti odia jhia	Mamuni Mishra	
2018			
2019			
2020	Sahid Raghu Sardar	Pushpa Panda	
2021	Khyudha	Sadhana Mali	
2021	Drustikona	Elina Samantray	
2022			
2023	Delivery Boy	Suryamayee Mohapatra	
2024	Kemiti E Samparka	Lipsa Mishra	

=== Odisha State Film Award for Best Comedian ===
Year	Film	Comedian	Ref.
1980	Tapasya	Prasanna Mishra	
1981	X	X	
1982	X	X	
1983	X	X	
1984	Jaga Balia	Jairam Samal	
1985	Sahari Bagha	Jairam Samal	
1986	Sata Kebe Luchi Rahena	Radha Panda	
1987	Tunda Baida	Jairam Samal	
1988	Kanyadana	Narendra Behera	
1989	Pratosodh Aparadh Nuhen	Debu Brahma	
1990	X	X	
1991	Ama Ghara Ama Sansar	Bijay Mohanty	
1992	X	X	
1993	Shradhanjali	Debu Brahma	
1994	X	X	
1995	X	X	
1996	X	X	
1997	X	X	
1998	X	X	
1999	Vidhata	Jairam Samal	
2000	Sindur Nuhe Khala Ghara	Mami Bhuiya	
2002	X	X	
2003	Sabat Maa	Shritam Das	
2004	X	X	
2005	Wrong Number	Pintu Nanda	
2006	Prema Rutu Asilare	Pintu Nanda	
2007	Mu Tate Love Karuchi	Mihir Das	
2008	Hasib Puni mo Suna Sansar	Bhakta Prahalad Pattnaik (Hadu)	
2009	Suna Chadei Mo Rupa Chadei	Harihara Mohapatra	
2010	Prema Adhei Akhyara	Jiban Panda	
2011	Mote Bohu Kari Nei Jaa	Bhakta Prahalad Pattnaik (Hadu); Leena	
2012	Tu Mo Suna tu Mo Hira	Hrushikesh	
2013	Gaddbadd	Antryayami Panda	
2014	Smile Please	Bhakta Prahalad Pattnaik (Hadu)	
2015	Ishq Tu Hi Tu	Pragyan Khatua	
2016	Love you Jessica	Chittaranjan Tripathy	
2017	Hero no.1	Tribhuban Panda	
2018			
2019			
2020	-Not awarded-		
2021	Arundhati	Sankar Pradhan	
2022			
2023	Shanti Apartment - Flat No. 203	Santosh Kumar Kandi	
2024	Adrushya	Jiban Panda	

=== Odisha State Film Award for Best Child Artist ===
Year	Film	Winner	Ref.
1978	Balidan	Soumitri Patnaik	
1979	Mathura Bijay	Baban Kumar	
1980	Agni Parikshya	Luna Mahapatra	
1981	X	X	
1982	Ram Rahim	Bapi	
1983	Dhare Alua	Amrita Ahmed	
1984	Basanta Rasa	Lisa Mohanty	
1985	Shesha Pratikshya	Dwipnita Das	
1986	Bhanga Silata	Susma Das	
1987	Bhuli Huena	Pinky	
1988	Kurukshetra	Sidhartha Bose	
1989	Pratisodha Aparadh Nuhen	Mayuri	
1990	Paradeshi Chadhei	Suman Mishra	
1990	Chaka Dola Karuchi Leela	Jani	
1991	Ama Ghara Ama Sansara	Suman Mishra	
1992	Agni Sankat	Dipayan Das	
1993	Mo Khanu Re	Tarun	
1994	Sagara Ganga	Kiran Rana	
1995	Mokhya	Bapi	
1996	X	X	
1997	X	X	
1998	X	X	
1999	X	X	
2000	X	X	
2001	Lakshmi Ra Abhisar	Jagyanseni Jena	
2002	To Akhi Mo Aina	Anshuman	
2003	Aw Aakare Aa	Adyasha Mohapatra	
2004	Om Shanti Om	Chandan	
2005	Puja Pain Phulatie	Adyasha Mohapatra	
2006	Shaashu Ghara Chaalijibi	Prakruti Mishra	
2007	Samay Hathare Dori	Swarajya Barik	
2008	Kalinga Putra	Buddhan	
2009	Sata Sure Bandha E Jibana	Omkar	
2010	Sasura Ghara Zindabad	Ankit	
2011	Eka Eka	Anwesha Mohapatra	
2012	Emiti Bi Prema Hue	Aryan Misra	
2013	Rumku Jhumana	Bhoomika Dash	
2014	Papi	Jitulal Sahu	
2015	Tulasi Apa	Madhusmita Maharana	
2016	Chini	Tithirupa Bahidar	
2017	Sapana tie	Maguni Patra	
2018			
2019			
2020	Mask (short film)	Ajay Kumar Choudhary	
2021	Bishwaas–The Light Over Darkness	Nabanit Mohanty	
2022			
2023	Shanti Apartment - Flat No. 203	Alia Nanda	
2024	Tuma Bina	Latasa Khurana	

=== Odisha State Film Award for Best Photography ===
Year	Film	Cinematographer	Ref.
1981	Ulka	Raju Mishra	
1982	Phula Chandan	Rajan Kinnagi	
1983	Swapna Sagara	Bhanu Kumar	
1984	Dora	Surendra Sahu	
1985	Hakim Babu	Rajan Kinnagi	
1986	Trisandhya	Dilip Ray	
1987	Tunda Baida	Rajan Kinnagi	
1988	Suna Chadhei	Rajan Kinnagi	
1989	Rajani Gandha	Surendra Sahu	
1990	Ageena Beena	Jehangir Choudhary	
1991	Adi Mimansa	Apurba Kishore Bir	
1992	Bhinna Samaya	Jehangir Choudhary	
1993	Aranya Rodan	Raju Misra	
1994	Lubai Dak	Nirajan Das	
1995	Mana Ra Murachana	M. Ray	
1996	Sunya Swarupa	Sudhir Palsane	
1997	Ahalya	Jugal Debata	
1998	Sata Michha	Raju Misra	
1999	Pabitra Badhan	Shamba Siba Rao	
2000	Gare Sindur Dhare Luha	Shamba Siba Rao	
2001	Laxmi Ra Abhisar	Raju Misra	
2002	Pua Mora Jagata Jita	Jugal Debata	
2003	Rahichhi Rahibi Tori Pain	Ranjan Mishra	
2004	Om Santi Om	Shamba Siba Rao	
2005	Kathantara	Sameer Mahajan	
2006	Puja Pain Phulatie	Jugal Debata	
2007	Rasik Nagar	Susant Bahinipati	
2007	Chaka Chaka Bhaunri	Abhiram Misra	
2008	Jianta Bhuta	Apurba Kishore Bir	
2009	Abhimanyu	Subhransu Das	
2010	Swayamsiddha	Sanjeev Mohapatra	
2011	Thukul	Abhiram Misra	
2012	Nai Separi Kanak Gori	Gagarin Mishra	
2013	Superstar	Barada Prasana Tripathy	
2014	Bhaunri	Sanjeev Mohapatra	
2015	Tulasi Apa	Arjun Jena	
2016	Chini	Dilip Ray	
2017			
2018			
2019			
2020	Sahid Raghu Sardar	Niranjan Das; Rajesh Yogi	
2021	Chakhyu Bandhan	Deepak Kumar Ghadai	
2022			
2023	My Sweet Housewife	Rudrakanta Singh	
2024	Bhagia Bharija	Manas Kumar Mishra	

=== Odisha State Film Award for Best Story ===
Year	Film	Story writer	Ref.
1973	Adina Megha	Kuntala Kumari Sabat	
1974	Ghara Sansar	Rama Chandra Mishra	
1975	Samaya	Ganesh Mohapatra	
1976	Shesha Shrabana	Basant Mahapatra	
1977	X	X	
1978	Balidana	Prasanta Nanda	
1979	Chinha Acinha	Binod Nanda	
1980	Aparachita	Pratibha Ray	
1981	X	X	
1982	Asanta Graha	Bijaya Misra	
1983	Maya Miriga	Nirad N. Mohapatra; Bibhuti Patnaik	
1984	Kaberi	Gayatri Basu Malik	
1985	Sesha Pratikshya	Pranab Das	
1986	Trisandhya	Nandalal Mahapatra	
1987	Badhu Nirupama	Bibhuti Pattnaik	
1988	Kasturi	J.H.Satar	
1989	Andha Diganta	Prakash Patra	
1990	Mukti Mashala	Santanu Mishra	
1991	Adi Mimansa	Nandalal Mahapatra	
1992	Mukti Tirtha	Himansu Das	
1993	Aranya Rodan	Satakodi Hota	
1994	X	X	
1995	Mokhya	Premlata Roy	
1996	Nila Masterani	V.G. Mahapatra	
1997	Ahalya	Laxmipriya Acharya	
1998	Sata Michha	Raju Misra	
1999	Maa O Mamata	Jyoti Prakash Debata	
2000	Gare Sindur Dhare Luha	Bibhuti Pattnaik	
2001	Laxmi Ra Abhisar	Manoj Das	
2002	Samaya Chaka Re Sansara Rath	Biyaj Mishra	
2003	Aw Aaakare Aa	Subas Das	
2004	Om Santi Om	Prasant Nanda	
2005	Kathantara	Himansu Khatua	
2006	Puja Pain Phulatie	Gadadhar Puty	
2007	Chaka Chaka Bhaunri	Suvendu Swain	
2008	Satye Mabe Jayete	Biranchi Naryan Panda	
2009	Ulugulan	Deepak Panda	
2010	Swayamsiddha	Namita Mallick	
2011	Thukul	Prashant Nanda	
2012	Tu Mo Suna tu Mo Hira	Chinmayee Mohanty	
2013	Superstar	Debananda Panda; Barada Prasanna Tripathy	
2014	Krantidhara	Iti Samanta	
2015	Ishq Tu Hi Tu	Tapas Sarghariya	
2016	Namard	Dilip Choudhury	
2017			
2018			
2019			
2020	Sahid Raghu Sardar	Dr Biswa Patnaik	
2021	Bhoka	Ranjan Das	
2021	Pratikshya	Gaurahari Das	
2022	Bagha Bazari Dance of Tigers	Mihir Ranjan Acharya	
2022			
2023	Niyati	Pinaki Srichandan	
2024	Vote	Ajay Mohapatra	

=== Odisha State Film Award for Best Screen Play ===
Year	Film	Screen Play	Ref.
1988	Kichhi Smruti Kichhi Anubhuti	Nada Lal Mohapatra	
1989	Rajni Gandha	Bijaya Mishra	
1990	Paradesi Chadhei	Sankar Kinagi	
1991	X	X	
1992	Agni Sanket	Pranab Das	
1993	Indradhanura Chhai	Sushant Mishra	
1994	X	X	
1995	X	X	
1996			
1997	Ahalya	Bijoy Ketan Mishra	
1998	Bou	Sabyasachi Mohapatra	
1999	Pabitra Badhan	Ravi Kinnagi	
2000	Sindur Nuhe Khela Ghara	Ravi Kinnagi	
2001	Laxmi Ra Abhisar	Raju Mishra	
2002	Muhurta	Man Mohan Mahapatra	
2003	Sabat Maa	Sisir Misra	
2004	X	X	
2005	Sasughara Chali Jibi	Bijay Mishra	
2006	Pheria Mo Suna Bhauni	Ranjit Mohanty	
2007	Rasik Nagar	Dilip Panda	
2008	Kalinga Putra	Barada Prasana Tripathy	
2009	Akaesha Ki Ranga Lagila	Bijaya Mall	
2010	-No selection-		
2011	Eka Eka	Subas Das	
2012	-Not awarded-		
2013	Superstar	Barada Prasanna Tripathy	
2014	Aadim Vichar	Sabyasachi Mohapatra	
2015	Kehi Nuhe Kahar	Sushant Mani	
2016	Namard	Dilip Choudhury	
2017			
2018			
2019			
2020	-Not Awarded-		
2021	Chakhyu Bandhan	Dilip Kumar Choudhary	
2022			
2023	Phalguna Chaitra	Pranab Prasanna Rath	
2024	Parab	Chinmay Kumar Das	

=== Odisha State Film Award for Best Dialogue ===
Year	Film	Winner	Ref.
1993	Indradhanura Chhai	Debasis Chotrai	
2011	Mu Premi Mu Pagala	Rajani Ranjan	
2012	-Not awarded-		
2013	Superstar	Saranarabinda	
2014	-No selection-		
2015	Tulasi Apa	Chinmay Das Pattnaik	
2016	Love you Jessica	Dilip Choudhury	
2017			
2018			
2019			
2020	Sahid Raghu Sardar	Ranjani Ranjan Das	
2021	Ajati	Pranab Das	
2021	Bishwaas–The Light Over Darkness	Chinmay Patnaik	
2022			
2023	Mana Museum	Bharadwaj Panda	
2024	Sindura	Bijay Das	

=== Odisha State Film Award for Best Lyrics ===
Year	Film	Winner	Ref.
1988	Suna Chadhei	Devdas Chottray	
1989	Rajani Gandha	Nizam	
1990	Daiba Daudi	Devdas Chottray	
1991	Kotia Manisha Gotia Jaga	Jogananda Sahu	
1992	X	X	
1993	X	X	
1994	Rupa Gaon Ra Suna Kania	Devdas Chottray	
1995	Sakala Tirtha To Charane	Swarup Nayak	
1996	Raghu Arakhita	Akshaya Mohanty	
1997	Jibana Sathi	Nizam	
1998	X	X	
1999	Mana Rahi Gala Tumari Thare	Swarup Nayak	
2000	Gare Sindur Dhare Luha	Narayan Prasad Singh	
2001	Samaya Kheluchhi Chaka Bhaoari	Nimaie Mohanty	
2002	Nari Nuhe Tu Narayani	Swarup Nayak	
2003	Rahichi Rahibi Tori Paain	Srikant Gautam	
2004	Suna Sankhali	Sirsananda Das Kanungo	
2005	Jiban Mrutyu	Swarup Nayak	
2006	Bhagya Chakra	Ramani Ranjan Das	
2007	Tumaku Paruni Ta Bhuli	Nirmal Nayak	
2008	Aa Janhera Lekhiba Naa	Debidutt Mohanty	
2009	Sata Sure Bandha E Jibana	Basantraj Samal	
2010	Swayamsiddha	Swarup Nayak	
2011	Kebe Tume Naha, Kebe Mu Nahin	Arun Mantri	
2012	Nai Separi Kanak Gori	Bijaya Malla	
2013	Sapanara Nayika	Jiten Mohanty	
2014	Rasta	Mohit Chakravarty	
2015	Kehi Nuhe Kahar	Bapu Goswami	
2016	Agastya	Subrat Swain	
2017			
2018			
2019			
2020	Romeo Raja	Panchanan Nayak	
2021	Bishwaas–The Light Over Darkness	Chinmay Daspattnaik	
2022			
2023	Maharshi	Dr. Nirmal Nayak	
2024	Karma	Durga Madhab Panda	

=== Odisha State Film Award for Best Music Director ===
Year	Film	Music director	Ref.
1975	Mamata	Prafulla Kar	
1976	Shesha Shrabana	Prafulla Kar	
1977	Bandhu Mohanty	Prafulla Kar	
1978	Sati Anusaya	Prafulla Kar	
1979	Mathura Bijaya	Balakrushna Das	
1980	Sita Laba Kusha	Prafulla Kar	
1981	Aarati	Basudev Ratha	
1982	Phula Chandan	Saroja Patanaik	
1983	Abhilasa	Saroja Patanaik	
1984	Basant Rasa	Balakrushna Das	
1985	School Master	Prafulla Kar	
1986	Sata Kebe Luchi Rahena	Basanta Das	
1987	Badhu Nirupama	Akshaya Mohanty	
1988	Papa Punya	Arun Mohanty	
1989	Rajaani Gandha	Murali Subash	
1990	Kalia Bharasha	Akshaya Mohanty	
1992	Mukti Tirtha	Shantanu Mohapatra	
1993	Bhisma Pratingya	Akshaya Mohanty	
1994	Sagara Ganga	Radhakrushna Bhanja	
1995	X	X	
1996	Sunya Swaroop	B. V. Karanth	
1997	Ahalya	Raghunath Panigrahi	
1998	Laxmi Pratima	Saroj Nanda	
1999	Mana Rahi Gala Tumari Thare	Swarup Nayak	
2000	Maa Pari kia Heba	Biju Swain	
2001	Dharma Sahile Hela	Manmath Mishra	
2002	Pua Mora Jagata Jita	Akshaya Mohanty	
2003	Nari Akhi Re Nia	Malaya Mishra	
2004	Om Santi Om	Manmath Mishra	
2005	Shaashu Ghara Chaalijibi	Swarup Nayak	
2006	Bhagya Chakra	Om Prakash Mohanty	
2007	Dhauli Express	Chittaranjan Tripathy	
2008	Hasib Puni Mo Suna Sansar	Babu Mishra	
2009	Sata Sure Bandha E Jibana	Manmath Mishra	
2010	Tu Tha Mun Jauchi Rushi	Abhijit Majumdar	
2011	Chandini I Miss You	Premananda	
2012	Tu Mo Arambha Tu Mo Sesha	Badrinath Das	
2013	Sala Budha	Pankaj Jall; Ghasiram Mishra	
2014	Golapi Golapi	Bikash Das	
2015	Tulasi Apa	Pankaj Jall	
2016	Tu Kahibu Na Mu	Goodly Rath	
2017			
2018			
2019			
2020	Romeo Raja	Baidyanath Das	
2021	Trushna	Abhijit Majumdar	

=== Odisha State Film Award for Best Singer ===
Year	Film	Female Singer	Ref.	Film	Male Singer	Ref.
1976	X	X		Sindura Bindu	Pranab Patnaik	
1977	X	X		Mukti	Raghunath Panigrahi	
1978	Taapoi	Trupti Das		Balidan	Prafula Kar	
1979	Srikrushna Rasalila	Bhubaneswari Mishra		Mathura Bijay	Bhikari Bal	
1980	Jay Ma Mangala	Bhubaneswari Mishra		Kie Jite Kie Hare	Akshaya Mohanty	
1981	Devajani	Vani Jairam		Tike Hasa Tike Luha	Bhikari Bal	
1982	Asanta Graha	Geeta Patanaik		Astaraga	Pranab Patnaik	
1983	Dhare Aalua	Indrani Mishra		Jhiati Sita Pari	Pranab Patnaik	
1984	Jaga Balia	Trupti Das		Jaiphula	Akshaya Mohanty	
1985	Gruhalakshmi	Gita Das		School Master	Ajaya Chakrabarty	
1986	Sata kebe Luchi Rahena	S. Janaki		Ei Aama Sansar	Akshaya Mohanty	
1987	Tunda Baida	Anuradha Paudwal		Badhu Nirupama	Akshaya Mohanty	
1988	Jahaku Rakhibe Ananta	Trupti Das		Kanyadaan	Pranab Patnaik	
1989	Sasti	Trupti Das		Pratisosh Aparadh Nehen	Pranab Patnaik	
1990	Daiba Daudi	Geeta Das		Daiba Daudi	Subas Das	
1991	Ama Ghar Ama Sansar	Lopita Mishra		Kotia Manisha Gotia Jaga	Debasis Mohapatra	
1992	Mukti Tirtha	Lopita Mishra		Mukti Tirtha	Debasis Mohapatra	
1993	Mo Kanhu Re	K. S. Chithra		Asha	Pranab Patnaik	
1994	Sagar Ganga	Sadhna Sargam		Akuha Katha	Kumar Sanu	
1995	Sakala Tirtha To Charana	Geeta Das & Sangita & Schitra		X	X	
1996	X	X		Raghu Arakhita	Akshaya Mohanty	
1997	Khandaei Akhi Re Luha	Anuradha Paudwal		Jibana Sathi	Chandra Sekhara	
1998	Sata Michha	Gita Das		Ram Laxman	Sonu Nigam	
1999	Mana Rahi Gala Tumari Thare	Ira Mohanty		Mana Rahi Gala Tumari Thare	Subash Das	
2000	Gare Sindura Dhare Luha	Mitali Chinara		Kasia Kapila	Rudra Mahanty	
2001	Mo Kola To Jhulana	Ira Mohanty		Mo Kola To Jhulana	T.Souri	
2002	Rakhi Bandili Mo Rakhib Mana	Priti Nanda		Rakhi Bandili Mo Rakhib Mana	Abhaya Mallia	
2003	Rahichhi Rahibi Tori Pain	Priti Nanda		Nari Akhi Re Nia	T.Souri	
2004	Suna Sankhali	Shweta Mishra		X	X	
2005	Shaashu Ghara Chaalijibi	Tapu Misra		Mo Mana Khali Tumari Pain	Saurabh Nayak	
2006	Puja Pain Phulatie	Sreeja Panda		Bhagya Chakra	Ratikant Satpathy	
2007	Rakate Lekchi Naa	Sulagana Nanda		Dhauli Express	Chittaranjan Tripathy	
2008	Hasib Puni Mo Suna Sansar	Sailabhama Mahapatra		Hasib Puni Mo Suna Sansar	Bibhu Kishore	
2009	Suna Chadhei Mo Rupa Chadhei	Ira Mohanty		Ulugulan	Pankaj Jal	
2010	Megha Sabari Re Asiba Pheri	Ira Mohanty		Prema Adhei Akhyara	Babushaan Mohanty	
2011	Mote Bohu Kari Nei Jaa	Ira Mohanty		Mu Premi Mu Pagala	Krishna Beura	
2012	Tu Mo Suna tu Mo Hira	Tapu Misra		Love Master	Babushaan Mohanty	
2013	Mu Raja Tu Rani	Ira Mohanty		Rumku Jhumana	Ratikant Satpathy	
2014	Ganja Ladhei	Tapu Misra		Kidnap	Sourav Nayak	
2015	To Sathe Bandha Mo Jibana Dori	Antra Chakarbarti		To Sathe Bandha Mo Jibana Dori	Goutam Giri	
2016	Mimansa	Mahalakshmi Iyer		Tu Kahibu Na Mu	Sashank	

=== Odisha State Film Award for Best Editor ===
Year	Film	Editor	Ref.
1988	Suna Chadhei	Rabi Pattnaik	
1989	Andha Diganta	Rabi Pattnaik	
1990	Paradesi Chadhei	Deben Mishra	
1991	Doora Diganta	Gadadhar Puty	
1992	Bihnna Samaya	Rabi Pattnaik	
1993	Bhisma Pratingya	Biswanath Ray	
1994	X	X	
1995	X	X	
1996	Nila Masterani	Chakradhar Sahu	
1997	Jeeban Sathi	Ashok Sarma	
1998	Sata Michha	Ashok Sarma	
1999	Maa O Mamata	Dilip Panda	
2000	Kasia Kapila	Deben Mishra	
2001	Samaya Kheluchhi Chaka Bhaunri	Biswanath Ray	
2002	Pua Mora Jagata Jita	Rabi Pattnaik	
2003	Aw Aaakare Aa	Gadadhar Puty	
2004	Om Santi Om	Prasant Nanda	
2005	Shaashu Ghara Chaalijibi	Susant Mani	
2006	Jai Jagannatha	Rajendra Mahapatra	
2007	Mu Tate Love Karuchi	Susant Mani	
2008	Jianta Bhuta	Prasant Nanda	
2009	Akaesha Ki Ranga Lagila	Chandra Sekhar Mishra	
2010	Sanju Aau Sanjana	Sukumar Mani	
2011	Kebe Tume Naha, Kebe Mu Nahin	Chakradhar Sahu	
2012	Love Master	Sukumar Mani	
2013	A.C.P. Sagarika	Sukumar Mani	
2014	Suka Asuchi	Chakradhar Sahu	
2015	Ishq Tu Hi Tu	Sukumar Mani	
2016	Love you Jessica	Sukumar Mani	
2017			
2018			
2019			
2020	Romeo Raja	Rajesh Das	
2021	Chakhyu Bandhan	Manas Kumar Sahoo	

=== Odisha State Film Award for Best Art Director ===
Year	Film	Art Director	Ref.
1981	Devajani	Budha Moharana	
1982	Hisab Nikas	Nikhil Baran Sengupta	
1983	Maya Miriga	Sampad Mohapatra	
1984	Janani	Nikhil Baran Sengupta	
1985	Hakim Babu	Nikhil Baran Sengupta	
1986	Bhanga Silata	Aruna Das	
1987	Nisiddha Swapna	Banchhanidhi Patnaik	
1988	Jahaku Rakhibe Ananta	Budha Maharana	
1989	Rajnigandha	Budha Maharana	
1990	Mukti Mashal	Ranjan Misra; Pitabas Senapati	
1991	X	X	
1992	Agni Sankat	A. Basu	
1993	Shradhanjali	Pradumna Das	
1994	Lubai Dak	Sushant Adhikari	
1995	X	X	
1996	Sunya Swarupa	Amiya Maharana	
1997	Ahalya	Subas Sahu	
1998	Sata Michha	Buddha Maharana	
1999	Pabitra Badhana	Pitabas Senapati	
2000	Kasia Kapila	Pitabas Senapati	
2001	Dharma Debata	Rabi Maharana	
2002	Samaya Chaka Re Sansara Rath	Pitabas Senapati	
2003	Rahichhi Rahibi Tori Pain	Subas Sahu	
2004	X	X	
2005	Babu I Love You	Amiya Maharana	
2006	Shaashu Ghara Chaalijibi	Pradip Swain	
2007	Dhauli Express	Amiya Maharana	
2008	Jianta Bhoota	Budha Maharana	
2009	Akaesha Ki Ranga Lagila	Maguni Parida	
2010	Swayamsiddha	Budha Maharana	
2011	Keimiti E Bandhana	Amiya Maharana	
2012	-Not awarded-		
2013	Sala Budha	Kunu Bej	
2014	Suka Asuchi	Surendra Sethi	
2015	Ishq Tu Hi Tu	Subash Behera	
2016	Chini	Deben Amat	
2017			
2018			
2019			
2020	Sahid Raghu Sardar	Suresh Chandra Sethi	
2021	Wuhan Ru Odisha	Sudhanshu Bhushan Mohanty	

=== Odisha State Film Award for Best Sound Recordist ===
Year	Film	Sound Recordist	Ref.
1980	Jai Maa Mangla	Golak Bihari Misra	
1981	X	X	
1982	X	X	
1983	X	X	
1984	Janani	Nagen Barik	
1985	Sahari Bagha	Nagen Barik; S. Srinibasan	
1986	Aei Ama Sansar	Nagen Barik	
1987	Nisiddha Swapna	Sanjay Pathak	
1988	Suna Chadhei	Nagen Barik; Sanjay Pathak	
1989	Rajni Gandha	Sanjay Pathak	
1990	Chaka Dola Karuchi Leela	Sanjay Pathak	
1991	Kotia Manisha Gotia Jaga	Sanjay Pathak	
1992	X	X	
1993	Asha	Nagen Barik	
1994	Lubai Dak	Sushant Adhikari	
1995	Mana Ra Murchana	Nagen Barik	
1996	Nila Masterani	Subash Sahu	
1997	Kandhei Akhire Luha	Nagen Barik; Sanjay Pathak	
1998	Laxmi Pratima	Nagen Barik	
1999	Suna Harin	Sanjay Pathak	
2000	Pati Parameswara	Nagen Barik	
2001	Mo Kola To Jhulana	Nagen Barik; Arun Bose	
2002	Laxmi Narayana	Nagen Barik	
2002	Nari Nuhe Tu Narayani	Nagen Barik	
2003	Aw Aaakare Aa	Nagen Barik	
2004	Suna Sankhali	Nityasri Ranjan	
2005	Kathantara	Manas Chowdhury; Gitimugdha Sahani	
2006	Prema Rutu Asilare	Nityasri Ranjan	
2007	Rasik Nagar	Rakesh Das	
2008	Jianta Bhuta	Anup Mukherjee	
2009	Suna Chadhei Mo Rupa Chadhei	Swapnajit Sabat	
2010	Swayamsiddha	Jyoti Prakash Mahana	
2011	Eka Eka	Namita Nayak	
2012	Nai Separi Kanak Gori		
2013	Dharma	Upendra Panda	
2014	Suka Asuchi	Subas Sahu	
2015	Kehi Nuhe Kahar	Basudev Sethi	
2016	Mimansa	Subas Sahu	
2017			
2018			
2019			
2020	-Not Awarded-		
2021	Chakhyu Bandhan	Shakti Swarup Dwivedi	

=== Odisha State Film Award for Best Costumes ===
Year	Film	Costumer	Ref.
2012	Sapatha	Babuni	
2013	Sala Budha	Bhagawan Suresh	
2014	-Not awarded-		
2015	Kehi Nuhe Kahar		
2016	Mimansa	Santosh Kumar Dalai	
2017			
2018			
2019			
2020	Sahid Raghu Sardar	Sarat Kumar Behera	
2021	Trushna	Rabi Chandra Patra	

=== Odisha State Film Award for Best Makeup artist ===
Year	Film	Makeup artist	Ref.
2012	Love Master	Khirod Panda	
2013	Superstar	Samresh Pal	
2014	-Not awarded-		
2015	Kehi Nuhe Kahar		
2016	Tu Kahibu Na Mu	Samaresh Paul	
2017			
2018			
2019			
2020	Queen	Satyabrat Patara	
2021	Mayadarpana	Samresh Pall	

=== Odisha State Film Award (Special Jury Award) ===
Year	Film	Winner	Ref.
1983	Maya Miriga	Kishori Devi	
1983	Mana Akasha	Biju Sadangi	
1984	Basanta Rasa	Rabi Narayan Mohanty	
1985	Shesha Pratikhya	Bidyutmayee Das	
1986	Bhnga Silata	Sitakanta Mishra	
1987	X	X	
1988		Hemant Das; Archana Jogalker	
1989	Bhuka	Sabyasachi Mahapatra	
1990	Mukti Mashal		
1991	Doora Diganta		
1992	Agni Sanket	Bimal Rautrai	
1993	Indradhanu Ra Chhai		
1994	Akuha Katha	A. Purna Chandra Rao	
1995	Mana Ra Murchana		
1996	Nila Masterani	Rabi Rath	
1997	X	X	
1998	Sata Micha	Rai Mohan Parida	
1999	Suna Harini	Rachna Banerjee	
2000	Pati Parameswar	Jaya Swami	
2001	Lakshmi Ra Abhisar	Silalipi Parida	
2002	Muhurta	Rai Charan Das	
2003	Nari Akhire Nia	Meghna Misra	
2004	Suna Sankhali	Barsha Priyadarshini	
2005	Shaashu Ghara Chaalijibi	Basant Sahu	
2006	Jai Jaganatha	Sabyasachi Mahapatra	
2007	Tumaku Paruni Ta Bhuli	Rukmani Das; Chakrradhar Sahu	
2008	Jianta Bhuta	Rimjhim	
2009	Sata Sure Bandha E Jibana	Trupti Panda	
2010	Swayamsiddha	Siddhanta Mahapatra	
2011	Chandini I Miss You	Priya Choudhury	
2012	Emiti Be Prem Hue	Mihir Das	
2012	Tu Mo Suna tu Mo Hira	Singdha Mohanty	
2013	Gaddbadd	Ashwini Verma	
2013	Superstar	Anshuman	
2014	Aadim Vichar	Biswanath Swain	
2015	Pahada Ra Luha		
2016	Namard	Bidita Bag	
2022	Torch	Pranab Kumar Aich; Shantanu Mishra	

== See also ==
- Cinema of Odisha
- Filmfare Awards East
