= Mohan Sundar Deb Goswami =

Odissi classical musician, Guru of traditional Odisha Rasa theatre, Indian film director

- ମୋହନ ସୁନ୍ଦର ଦେବ ଗୋସ୍ୱାମୀ
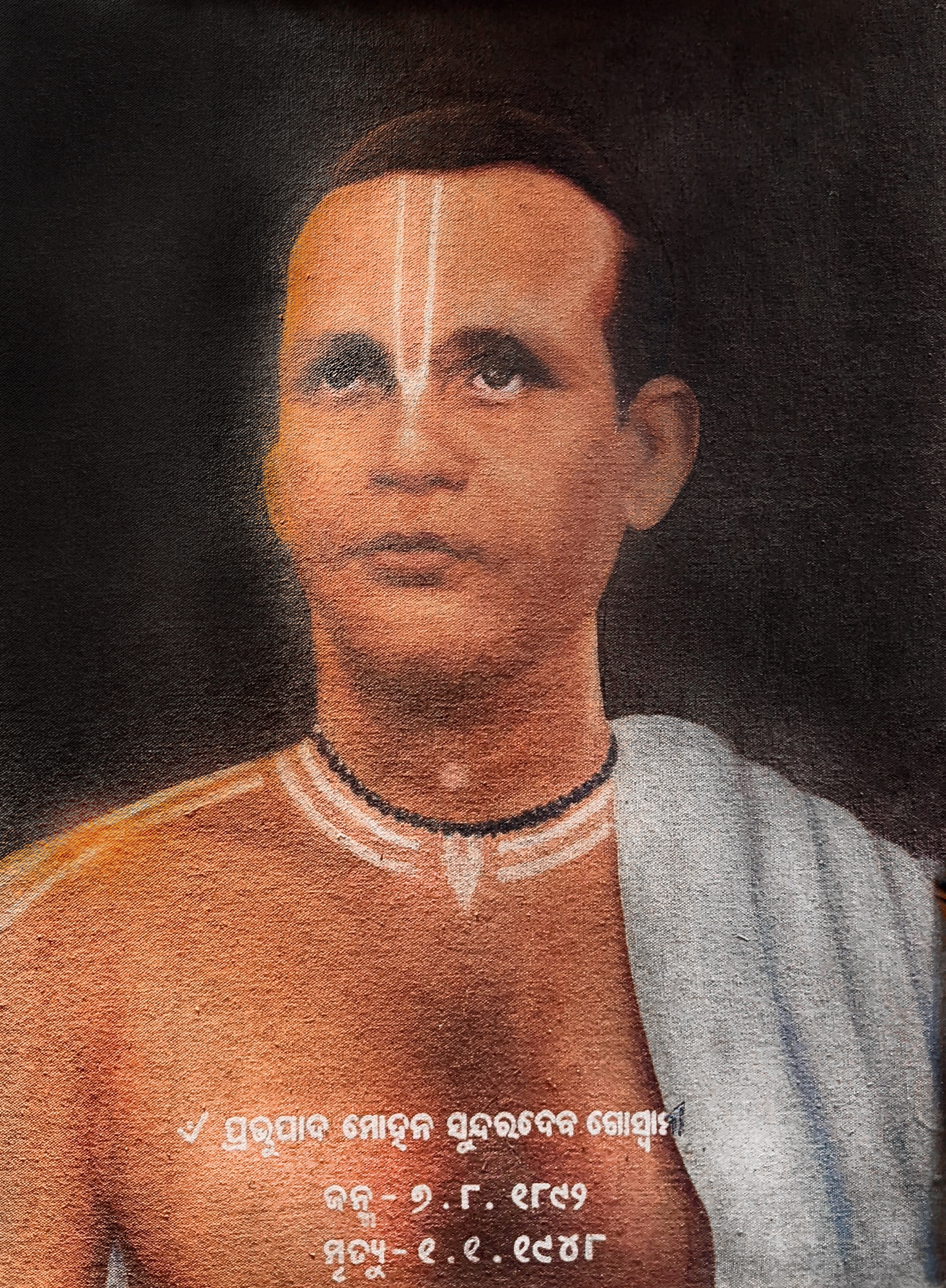
- Born: Shyama Sundar Deb Goswami; 8 August 1892; Puri, British India
- Died: 11 January 1948 (aged 55)
- Occupations: Film director, producer
- Known for: Odia Rahasa (Manabhanjana), Odissi music, Abhinaya (Odissi dance)
- Notable work: Manabhanjana
- Style: Odissi music

Mohan Sundar Deb Goswami (Odia: ମୋହନ ସୁନ୍ଦର ଦେବ ଗୋସ୍ୱାମୀ, romanized: Mohana Sundara Deba Goswāmi, 8 August 1892 – 11 January 1948) was an Odissi musician, poet & composer, a Guru of traditional Rahasa or Rasa and film director in Odia-language films. Widely known for his efforts to keep alive the Rahasa or Rasa, a traditional theatrical form depicting the romance of Radha and Krishna, Gosain became iconic for his renditions of classical Odissi songs, including Odissi, Chhanda, Champu, Kirtana, Bhajana, Janana, etc. His renditions on gramophone records pressed under the label His Master's Voice and over All India Radio made him a household figure in Odisha. He had a major role in creating the first Odia film Sita Bibaha in the year 1936, himself directing, producing and acting in this film.

== Mohan Sunder Dev Goswami awards ==
An annual film award has been constituted in his name in the state of Odisha.

Mohan Sunder Dev Goswami Awards
Serial	Name of Movie	Year
1	Kichhi Smurti Kichhi Anubhuti	1988
2	Andha Diganta	1989
3	Agni Bina	1990
4	Adi Mimansa	1991
5	Agni Sanketa	1992
6	Asha	1993
7	Lubai Daka	1994
8	Mokshya	1995
9	Sunya Swarupa	1996
10	Ahalya	1997
11	Bou	1998
12	Maa O Mamata	1999
13	Gare Sindura Dhare Luha	2000
14	Laxmira Abhisara	2001
15	Muhurtta	2002
16	Aa Aakare Aaa	2003
17	Om Shanti Om	2004
18	Kathantara	2005
19	Puja Paain Phulatie	2006
20	Dhauli Express	2007
21	Jeeanta Bhoota	2008
22	Sata Sure Bandha A Jeeban	2009
