= Odisha State Film Award for Best Singer =

Winners of Odisha State Film Award for Best Singer:

Year	Film	Female Singer	Film	Male Singer
1976	X	X	Sindura Bindu	Pranab Patnaik
1977	X	X	Mukti	Raghunath Panigrahi
1978	Taapoi	Trupti Das	Balidan	Prafula Kar
1979	Srikrushna Rasalila	Bhubaneswari Mishra	Mathura Bijay	Bhikari Bal
1980	Jay Ma Mangala	Bhubaneswari Mishra	Kie Jite Kie Hare	Akshaya Mohanty
1981	Devajani	Vani Jairam	Tike Hasa Tike Luha	Bhikari Bal
1982	Asanta Graha	Geeta Patanaik	Astaraga	Pranab Patnaik
1983	Dhare Aalua	Indrani Mishra	Jhiati Sita Pari	Pranab Patnaik
1984	Jaga Balia	Trupti Das	Jaiphula	Akshaya Mohanty
1985	Gruhalakshmi	Gita Das	School Master	Ajaya Chakrabarty
1986	Sata kebe Luchi Rahena	S. Janaki	Ei Aama Sansar	Akshaya Mohanty
1987	Tunda Baida	Anuradha Paudwal	Badhu Nirupama	Akshaya Mohanty
1988	Jahaku Rakhibe Ananta	Trupti Das	Kanyadaan	Pranab Patnaik
1989	Sasti	Trupti Das	Pratisosh Aparadh Nehen	Pranab Pattnaik
1990	Daiba Daudi	Geeta Das	Daiba Daudi	Subas Das
1991	Ama Ghar Ama Sansar	Lopita Mishra	Kotia Manisha Gotia Jaga	Debasis Mohapatra
1992	Mukti Tirtha	Lopita Mishra	Mukti Tirtha	Debasis Mohapatra
1993	Mo Kanhu Re	K. S. Chithra	Asha	Pranab Pattnaik
1994	Sagar Ganga	Sadhna Sargam	Akuha Katha	Kumar Sanu
1995	Sakala Tirtha To Charana	Geeta Das & Sangita & Schitra	X	X
1996	X	X	Raghu Arakhita	Akshaya Mohanty
1997	Khandaei Akhi Re Luha	Anuradha Paudwal	Jibana Sathi	Chandra Sekhara
1998	Sata Michha	Gita Das	Ram Laxman	Sonu Nigam
1999	Mana Rahi Gala Tumari Thare	Ira Mohanty	Mana Rahi Gala Tumari Thare	Subash Das
2000	Gare Sindura Dhare Luha	Mitali Chinara	Kasia Kapila	Rudra Mahanty
2001	Mo Kola To Jhulana	Ira Mohanty	Mo Kola To Jhulana	T.Souri
2002	Rakhi Bandili Mo Rakhib Mana	Priti Nanda	Rakhi Bandili Mo Rakhib Mana	Abhaya Mallia
2003	Rahichhi Rahibi Tori Pain	Priti Nanda	Nari Akhi Re Nia	T.Souri
2004	Suna Sankhali	Shweta Mishra	X	X
2005	Shaashu Ghara Chaalijibi	Tapu Misra	Mo Mana Khali Tumari Pain	Saurabh Nayak
2006	Puja Pain Phulatie	Sreeja Panda	Bhagya Chakra	Ratikant Satpathy
2007	Rakate Lekchi Naa	Sulagana Nanda	Dhauli Express	Chitaranjan Tripathy
2008	Hasib Puni Mo Suna Sansar	Sailabhama Mahapatra	Hasib Puni Mo Suna Sansar	Bibhu Kishore
2009	Suna Chadhei Mo Rupa Chadhei	Ira Mohanty	Ulugulan	Pankaj Jal
2010	Megha Sabari Re Asiba Pheri	Ira Mohanty	Prema Adhei Akhyara	Babushaan Mohanty
2011	Mote Bohu Kari Nei Jaa	Ira Mohanty	Mu Premi Mu Pagala	Krishna Beura
2012	Tu Mo Suna Tu Mo Hira	Tapu Misra	Love Master	Babushaan Mohanty
2013	Mu Raja Tu Rani	Ira Mohanty	Rumku Jhumana	Ratikant Satpathy
2015	To Sathe Bandha Mo Jibana Dori	Antra Chakarbarti	To Sathe Bandha Mo Jibana Dori	Goutam Giri
