= List of Odia films of 2023 =

This is a list of Odia films that were released in 2023.

== Films ==
Opening		Title	Director	Cast	Ref
J A N U A R Y	6	Tora Mora Kati	Ramesh Rout	Sidhant Mohapatra, Sailendra Samantaray, Sheetal Patra, Sudhanshu Mohan Sahoo, Sanjay Naik	
J A N U A R Y	8	Udanta Thalire Asichhi Priya	Sanjay Nayak	Abhijit Das, Cookies Swain	
J A N U A R Y	29	Bohu Amara Bichhuati	Sanjay Nayak	Lipsa Mishra, Bikram, Manaswitni Pati, Kuna Tripathy, Rabi Misrha	
J A N U A R Y	29	Kanyadana	Mrutyunjay Sahoo	Mahasweta Ray, Jasmin Rath, Bikram Mohanty	
F E B R U A R Y	17	Mama Weds Papa	Appu Kanungo	Abhishek Rath, Ritisha, Priyanka, Krusha Abhishek, Jyoti Mishra, Debu Pattnaik	
F E B R U A R Y	19	Bandini	Pinu Nayak	Subhasish Sharma, Riya Dey, Babi Mishra, Saroj Das, Subhranshu Nayak	
F E B R U A R Y	19	Breakup Wala Love-story	Rasesh Mohanty	Pradeep Kumar Sahu, Debasmita, Ilu Banarjee, Kedar Mishra, Shaki Baral	
M A R C H	3	Bajibalo Sahanai	Ashutosh Mohapatra	Amlan Das, Jhilik Bhattacharjee, Sambit Acharya	
M A R C H	3	Bapa Superman	Sudhanshu Mohan Sahoo	Sidhant Mohapatra, Supriya Nayak, Subhranshu, Ashwini Brahma	
M A R C H	5	Tinga Raju	Mrutyunjay Sahoo	Rakesh Deo, Piyali Dash, Pruthviraj Nayak, Udit Guru	
M A R C H	12	Prem for Sale	Sanjeeb Dwibedi	Sambit Acharya, Tamanna Vyas	
M A R C H	19	Bahaghara.com	Sudhanshu Mohan Sahoo	Pradeep Kumar Sahoo, Sayal Banarjee, Pushpa Panda, Pradyumna Lenka	
M A R C H	24	Mana Museum	Dhrubananda Panda	Nihar Nayak, Upasana Bhadra Mohanty, Sayal Mukherjee, Suryamayee Mohapatra	
M A R C H	24	Manaska	Manas Sahoo	Ashwini Ray Mohapatra, Madhumita Barik, Choudhury Bikash Das	
A P R I L	7	Delivery Boy	Ashwini Tripathy	Sailendra Samantaray, Priyambada Swain, Suryamayee Mohapatra, Buddhaditya Mohanty, Pupul Bhyuan	
M A Y	12	Phalguna Chaitra	Sisir Kumar Sahu and Peenakee Singh	Partha Sarathi Ray, BM Baisali, Ananya Mishra, Choudhary Jayprakash Das, Sukant Rath, Bhaswati Basu	
J U N E	13	Love in London	Tapas Sargharia	Anubhav Mohanty, Swapna Priyadarshini	
J U N E	13	Guddu Gangster	Ashok Pati	Sidhant Mohapatra, Sailendra Samantaray, Sivani Sangita	
J U L Y	21	Niyati	Pinaki Srichandan	Samaresh Routray, Pupul Bhuyan, Divya Mohanty, Sudhanshu Narayan Dash	
S E P T E M B E R	19	Pushkara	Subhransu Das	Sabyasachi Mishra, Surpriya Nayak, Pintu Nanda, Ashrumochan Mohanty	
O C T O B E R	19	Malyagiri	Prithvi Raj Pattnaik	Babushaan Mohanty, Amlan Das, Sivani Sangita, Suryamayee Mohapatra	
O C T O B E R	20	Katak-Sesha Ru Arambha	Sudhanshu Mohan Sahoo	Sidhant Mohapatra, Anu Choudhury, Devasis Patra	

== See also ==
- List of Odia films
- List of Odia films of 2022
- List of Odia films of 2024
