= List of Odia films of 1998 =

The following is a list of films produced in 1988 by the Ollywood film industry, which is based in Bhubaneshwar and Cuttack:

== A-Z ==
| Title | Director | Cast | Genre | Notes |
|---|---|---|---|---|
1998
| Bou | Sabyasachi Mohapatra | Mahasweta Roy, Bijay Mohanty | | |
| Eei Sangharsha | Arun Mohanty | Siddhanta Mahapatra, Deepti Naval | | |
| Laxmi Ra Abhisara | Raju Mishra | Anita Das, Mihir Das, Saroj Das | | |
| Nandan | A. K. Bir | Soubhagya Chandan Satapathy | | |
| Rupa Gaan Ra Suna Kania | Raju Mishra | Siddhanta Mahapatra | | |
| Sahara Jaluchi | Sudhansu Sahu | Siddhanta Mahapatra, Mihir Das, Mithun Chakraborty, Uttam Mohanty | | |
| Santana | Mohammad Mohsin | Siddhanta Mahapatra, Rachana Banerjee | | Remake of Hindi movie Beta |
| Singha Bahini | Basant Sahu | Siddhanta Mahapatra, Rachana Banerjee, Anushree | | |
| Soubhagyabati | | Siddhanta Mahapatra, Jyoti Misra, Mihir Das | | |
| Stree | Rabi Kinnagi | Ajit Das, Mihir Das, Archana Joglekar | | |
| Suna Palinki | Surya Misra | Siddhanta Mahapatra, Gayatri Jariwala, Rachana Banerjee, Sagar Misra | | |
