= Iti Rani Samanta =

Indian writer, film producer, journalist, editor (born in 1970)

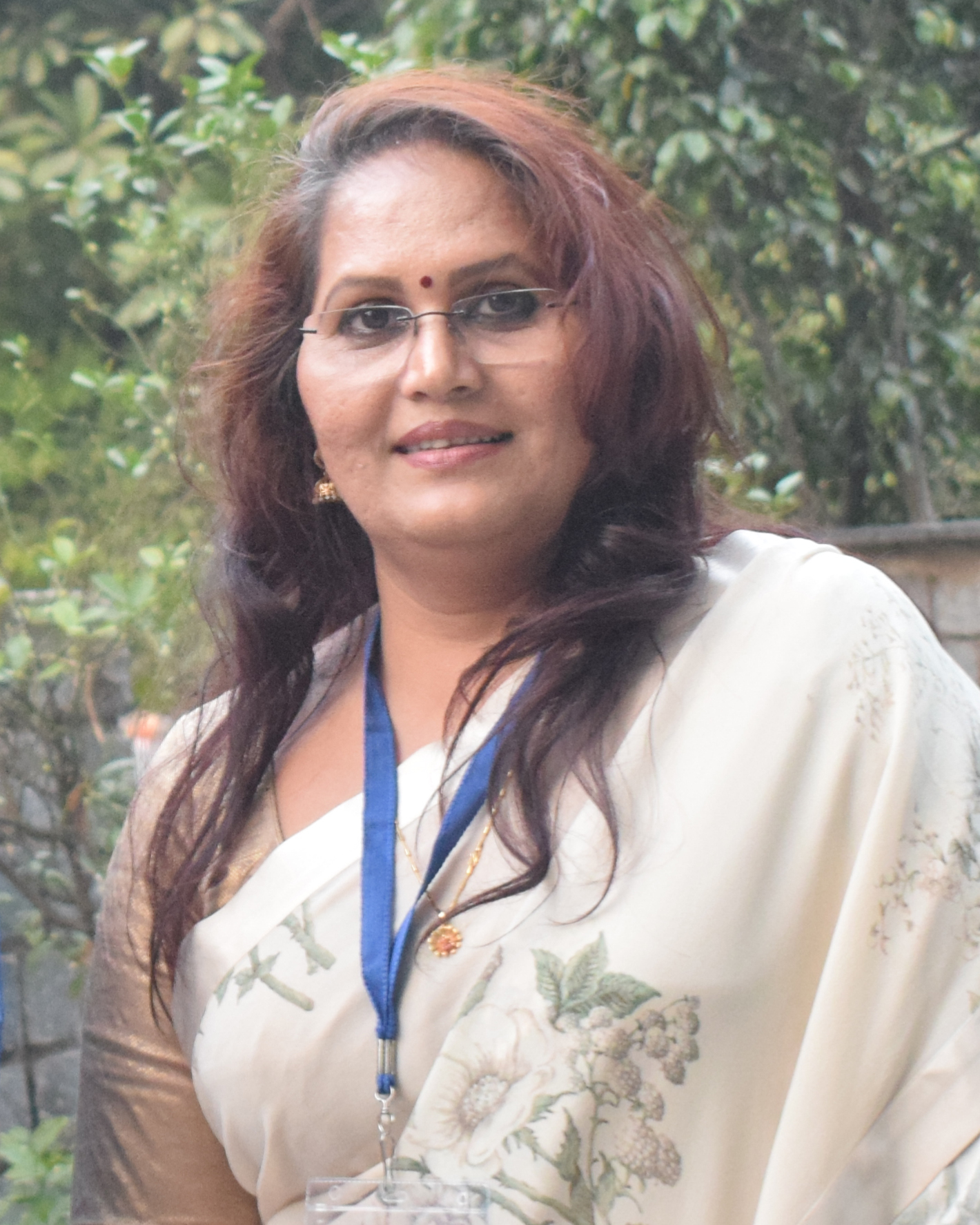
- Photograph of Samanta
- Born: 1970 (age 55–56); Cuttack, Odisha
- Education: M.A. in Literature, M.A. (Journalism and Mass Communication), Ph.D (Literature)
- Alma mater: Utkal University, Visva-Bharati University
- Occupations: writer, editor, film producer
- Children: Shreejit Abhishek
- Relatives: Achyuta Samanta (Elder brother)
- Awards: National Film Award, Odisha State Film Awards

Iti Rani Samanta (born in 1970) is an Indian columnist, journalist and film producer. She won the Odisha State Film Awards in 2014 for Best Story Writer. She is also the editor of the monthly family magazine The Kadambini and the children's magazine The Kunikatha.

== Early life and education ==
Iti Rani Samanta was born in 1970 in a village called Kalarabanka in Cuttack, Odisha. She is the youngest of the seven siblings born to Nilimarani Samanta and Anadi Charan Samanta. After losing her father early, and due to scarce economic support, Samanta's early childhood saw her struggling for sustenance and survival. She was brought up by her mother amidst poverty and sticky social challenges. Samanta pursued her primary education in her village school at Kalarabanka and thereafter shifted to Cuttack to complete her high school examination. Soon after completion of her +2 science from Ramadevi Women's College, Bhubaneswar, she joined electronics & telecommunication from Bhubaneswar to financially support her family. Since she wanted to become a writer, she joined the post-graduate degree program in Odia Literature and a Masters Degree in Mass Communication & Advanced Journalism from Utkal University, Odisha. Later, she did her Ph.D in literature from Visva-Bharati University, Shantiniketan and was awarded the fellowship instituted by Ministry of Culture, Government of India.

== Career ==
Samanta's early writing efforts later developed into short stories, novels and feature articles on women's empowerment and other gender-related issues.

Dr. Samanta established Kadambini Media Pvt Ltd in the year 2000. From the beginning as a publisher of family magazine The Kadambini the organization has now expanded to a leading publishing house. The Kadambini and The Kunikatha are two magazines in Odia being published by Kadambini Media and run by Samanta, who also edits these two periodicals.

In November 2023, she served as jury member at the 54th International Film Festival of India for Indian Panorama Feature Films section.

=== Filmography ===
Kadambini Media claims to provide a platform to young people to showcase their talent in the field of art, literature and cinema. Kadambini Media has also ventured into the field of audio-visual productions and during the past years, it has also produced several television series, tele-films and music albums.

Kadambini Media marked its début in feature film production with its maiden offer Kathantara. The film directed by Himansu Sekhar Khatua won the Odisha State Film Awards-2005 as well as the Silver Lotus for Best Odia Feature Film 2006. The next venture Krantidhara (2014) based on a short story ‘Jhada Parara Surya’ by Samanta also won the Asian Excellence Film Awards 2019 in South Korea.

=== Television ===
- Bhinna Manisha Bhinna Katha (A series on the lives of transgender people)
- Kadambini Ama Patrika (A weekly literary television magazine)
- Kahani Gita Pachhara (The stories behind popular Odia songs)
- Katha Apanka Pasandara (A television show about celebrities)
- Glamour Lane (A television show on the glamour world of cinema and television)
- Chit Chat (Gossip between two celebrity actors)

== Honours ==
=== Films ===
- National Award for best film production in 2006 for Odia feature Film Kathantara
- Odisha State Film Awards for Best Film Kathantara
- Odisha State Film Awards 2014 for best feature film Krantidhara
- Odisha State Film Awards 2014 for best story writer for the film [Krantidhara

=== Editing ===
- Kaliprasad Das Upanyas Samman
- Rajiv Gandhi Sadbhabana Award – 2008 & 2007 (as best editor)
