= Tu Kahibu Na Mu =

- Directed by: Susant Mani
- Screenplay by: Susant Mani
- Story by: Susant Mani
- Produced by: Tarang Cine Productions
- Starring: Niharika Dash; Amlan Das; Aparajita Mohanty; Mihir Das
- Cinematography: Sitansu Mohapatra
- Music by: Goodly Rath
- Production company: Tarang Cine Productions
- Release date: 15 January 2016
- Country: India
- Language: Odia

Tu Kahibu Na Mu is an Indian Odia-language romantic drama film directed by Susant Mani and produced by Tarang Cine Productions. It stars Niharika Dash and Amlan Das in lead roles while Aparajita Mohanty and Mihir Das play supporting roles. The music is released by Amara Muzik.

== Cast ==
- Niharika Dash
- Amlan Das
- Aparajita Mohanty
- Mihir Das
- Akash Das Nayak
- Papu Pom Pom
- Jairam Samal

== Music ==
The music rights of the film were acquired by Amara Muzic. The music of the film is composed by Goodly Rath while the lyrics are penned Arun Mantri and Bapu Goswami.

| No. | Title | Lyrics | Singer(s) | Length |
|---|---|---|---|---|
| 1. | "Tu Kahibu Na Mu" | Arun Mantri | Sourin Bhatt, Ira Mohanty | 4:32 |
| 2. | "Rahana Aau Tu Dure" | Bapu Goswami | Goodly Rath, Tapu Mishra | 4:51 |
| 3. | "Dine Futithila Fula" | Bapu Goswami | Shashank Shekhar | 4:01 |
| 4. | "Tu Gala Pare Pare" | Bapu Goswami | Tapu Mishra | 4:51 |
| 5. | "Odisha TV Re" | Arun Mantri | Bibhu Kishore, Aseema Panda | 4:01 |
| Total length: | | | | 22:16 |

== Awards ==
28th Odisha State Film Awards

- Best Music Director: Goodli Rath
- Best Playback Singer - Male: Shashank
