= Tumaku Paruni Ta Bhuli =

- Directed by: Chakradhara Sahu
- Written by: Sankar Tripathy& Ranjan Das
- Produced by: Chakradhara Sahu & Rukmani Das
- Starring: Manoj Misra; Sunil Kumar; Anu Chowdhury; Amelie Panda; Uttam Mohanty
- Cinematography: Ganeswara Mohapatra
- Edited by: Chakradhara Sahu
- Music by: Malaya Mishra
- Distributed by: Dreamland Cine Crafts
- Release date: 12 December 2007
- Country: India
- Language: Odia

Tumaku Paruni Ta Bhuli is a 2007 Indian Oriya film directed by Chakradhara Sahu.

== Plot ==
Anu & Ameli are two sisters. Both deeply in love with Sunil. But Sunil loves Anu. When Anu becomes aware of Ameli's love interest with Sunil, she decides to make a sacrifice and compels Sunil to marry Ameli. Anu herself marries Manoj, a local goon to stay away from Sunil & Amile. As usual Manoj starts torturing Anu & her son. In the meantime, when Sunil gets knowledge of Anu's trauma, he comes to rescue Anu from Manoj. In a clash between Sunil & Manoj, when Monaj attempts to kill Sunil, Anu kills Manoj.

== Cast ==
- Sunil Kumar
- Anu Chowdhury
- Amelie Panda
- Manoj Misra
- Uttam Mohanty
- Ashok Das

== Awards ==
Orissa State Film Awards 2006

- Best Director
- Best Supporting Actor
- Best Supporting Actress
- Best Lyrics
- Special Jury award

== Soundtrack ==
The composer of the film is Malay Misra.

Track	Song	Singer(s)	lyric
1	Aare Aare Mo Geetare Mitare Aare	Kunal Ganjawala	Mohit Chakraborty
2	Dinare Souchi Mun Rati Sounahin	Pankaja Jal & Ira Mohanty	Jatindra Pradhan
3	E Jibana Emiti Suna Geetatiere	Kunal Ganjawala	Arun Mantri
4	E kemiti Rutu Hela	Abhijit Misra	Nirmal Nayak
5	Na Na Nare Jibana Dau Sadhena	Kailash Kher	Bijaya Malla
