= Krantidhara =

- Theatrical poster
- Directed by: Himanshu Khatua
- Written by: Iti Samanta
- Produced by: Iti Rani Samanta
- Starring: Samaresh Routray; Gargi Mohanty; Debasis Patra
- Release date: 19 February 2016
- Country: India
- Language: Odia

Krantidhra is an Oriya film based on 'Jhada Pare Surya' written by Iti Samanta and directed by Himansu Sekhar Khatua . The main star cast of the film includes Samaresh Routray, Gargi Mohanty & Debasis Patra. The film is produced by Iti Rani Samanta.

== Plot ==
The story is based on women empowerment, the role of women in politics & society and it shows dominance of husband over wife in Indian society . The dilemma, the struggles a woman faces in her lifetime even after giving up everything for her husband & for being on the right side of humanity.

== Cast ==
- Gargi Mohanty ... as Pratigyan
- Samaresh Routray .... as Abhay
- Debashis Parta ... as Babu Swain
- Biduprava Pattnaik ... as Ranga Bou
- Priya Mishra ... as Father-in-law
- Bijaylaxmi Praharaj ... as Mother-in-law
- Asutosh Pattnaik ... as Bablu

== Awards ==
Krantidhara went on to win several awards at the 2014 Odisha State Film Awards, including the Best feature film of the year prize.

- Odisha State Film Awards
  - Best Film of the year 2014
  - Best Actress - Gargi Mahanty
  - Best Story - Iti Samanta
