= Antarleena (film) =

- Directed by: Manas Sahoo
- Written by: Sarojini Pattayat
- Produced by: Alina Samal, Maskman Film
- Starring: Soumyaranjan, Bijay Mohanty, Auro Varat Patnaik
- Cinematography: Subhendu Ghadei
- Edited by: Jyotiprakash
- Music by: Sudeep Prabhu
- Production company: Maskman Films
- Release date: 2015
- Running time: 145 minutes
- Country: India
- Language: Odia

Antarleena (transl. Engrossed Within Oneself) is a 2015 Indian Odia-language film directed by Manas Sahoo, produced by Alina Samal, and written by Sarojini Pattayat. The film stars Soumya Ranjan in the lead role, with Bijay Mohanty, Lipsa Bhawani, Dharitri, Ansuman, Auro Varat Patnaik, Subham, and Sai in supporting roles. The story is based on the point of view from an autistic savant child who is at first not accepted by society but goes on to become a writer and philosopher.

Antarleena is one of the first films of its kind in Odia.

== Plot ==
Chintan Das, known as Chinu, lives with his grandfather, Sunil Das, who is his only surviving family member. Unable to understand Chinu's restlessness and hyperactivity, and fearing for him, he takes Chinu to a doctor who diagnoses autism. Although he accepts the diagnosis, and attempts to research and understand Chinu, he continues efforts to make Chinu behave "like a normal child". Unable to face the reality of his grandson's condition, Sunil dies. Pihu, the little girl who is Chinu's only friend, leaves the city and makes him feel even more lonely. Renuka, the principal of a children's autistic centre, sees Chinu and recognises his condition. She takes him into her care, providing him with both occupational therapy and maternal affection. He begins pouring out his thoughts and feelings, and as he grows up, goes on to become a well known writer and philosopher. In the meantime, Pihu, inspired by the desire to understand the unusual behaviour of her childhood friend, becomes a research scholar in sociology. She comes to realise that the now famous writer Chintan Das is none other than her old friend, Chinu. She meets him and they visit landmarks to relive their old memories. In the process, Pihu tries to use her academic and research knowledge in sociology to teach Chinu to behave like an average person and socialise with others. This has a negative impact on their friendship, and he returns to his private world, becoming engrossed within his own thoughts again.

== Cast ==
- Soumyaranjan as Chintan Das/Chinu, based on a real person with autism.
- Auro Varat Patnaik as 14 year old Chinu
- Anshuman (Bapu) as Young Chinu
- Bijaya Mohanty as Sunil Das, Chinu's grandfather
- Lipsa Mishra as Adyasha/Pihu
- Adya Utkalika (Lity) as Young Pihu
- Dharitri Khandual as Renuka
- Bhabani Prasad as Udaya
- Sushant Mishra as Sunil's friend
- Minati Roy as Pihu's grandmother
- Kabi Das as Kabi's Uncle
- Upendra Nayak as the yoga teacher
- Alok Kundu as the therapy teacher
- Rainy as principal
- V. Jyoti as the class teacher
- Subham as 3 year old Chinu
- Jyoti Ratan as the anchor
- Anshuman Pratapshing as a courier boy
- Iti as Pihu's friend

== Casting ==
Manas Sahoo, Auro Varat Patnaik, and Soumya Das visited a school for autistic children to gain an understanding of their behaviour, lifestyle and body language.

Soumya Ranjan was awarded Best actor at the Odisha State film Awards for his performance.

== Development ==
Director Manas Sahoo was contemplating a film on the subject of intellectual disability when he and Alina Samal met the autistic daughter of an acquaintance. Never having met someone with autism before, they decided to take on this subject as the concept for their next film, to create more awareness about the condition. While researching the complexities and realities of autism by consulting and with people in the medical field, they met Gautam Panda, an autistic savant child, who became the final inspiration for their story concept.
