= Maya Miriga =

- Poster
- Directed by: Nirad N. Mohapatra
- Written by: Bibhuti Patnaik; Nirad N. Mohapatra
- Produced by: Lotus Film International
- Starring: Kishori Devi; Sampad Mahapatra; Manaswini Mangaraj
- Cinematography: Raj Gopal Mishra
- Edited by: Bibekanand Satpathy
- Music by: Bhaskar Chandavarkar
- Distributed by: Lotus Film International
- Release date: 1984
- Running time: 120 minutes
- Country: India
- Language: Odia

Maya Miriga (English:The Mirage) is a 1984 award-winning Odia film directed by Nirad N. Mohapatra.

== Plot ==
Three generations of a family live under a decaying roof. The widowed grandmother is the head of the family, her son Raj Kishore Babu, father of four sons and a daughter, is a gentle yet disciplined headmaster on the verge of retirement. Raj demands his sons pursue education as a means of upward mobility. The centre of the family's hopes is the brilliant second son studying in Delhi to get into the Indian Administrative Service. When he is admitted to the IAS, the family thinks all their sacrifices have been worth it.

The family receives flattering marriage proposals and the IAS probationer marries a city-bred girl above his status. Unvoiced protest comes from the eldest daughter-in-law Prabha, beast of burden and kitchen slave. Her husband is a college lecturer. Prabha wonders if the IAS officer's wife will share the chores. She is proved right when the new bahu defies tradition by opting to stay with her parents when the husband is away on training. She takes her dowry of a new fridge and furniture to her independent home, causing strong resentment in Prabha. She nudges her husband towards independence and he opts to be deputed to Cuttack. The bewildered patriarch seeks consolation in stoic acceptance of these changes, ruminating over the younger generation's break for independence on his walks with a friend who waits for his America-based son. In his hurting, he has the comfort of memories to fall back upon just as his two older sons have their future to look forward to. The youngest son, the rebel whose passion is cricket, not only manages to get a first class but shames the IAS brother into financing his higher studies in Delhi. The timid third son, whose second division in the all-important exam leaves him in mediocrity, is left with a sense of being a failure and conscious of his father's disappointment.

== Cast ==
- Kishori Devi as Raj Kishore's wife
- Sampad Mahapatra as Tutu
- Manaswini Mangaraj as Prabha
- Manimala
- Binod Misra as Tuku
- Bansidhar Satpathy as Raj Kishore
- Sujata Mahapatra as Tutu's Wife
- Bibekananda Satpathy
- Shriranjan Mohanty

== Restoration ==
Māyā Miriga was restored using the best surviving elements: the 16 mm original camera negative preserved at Film Heritage Foundation and a 35 mm print preserved at the NFDC-National Film Archive of India.

The restoration was extremely challenging as the original camera negative was found by Film Heritage Foundation abandoned in a warehouse in a very poor condition with certain portions of the film having no image. The 35 mm print had also deteriorated over time. The image was very grainy and blurred in portions and the colours had faded to magenta. The restoration, which took almost three years, needed hours of work on the film repair, digital restoration and colour grading.

The restored version of the film premiered at Il Cinema Ritrovato 2024, and was later screened at the MAMI Mumbai Film Festival 2024 under the Restored Classics section.

== Awards and Participation ==
- Cannes Film Festival (1984), Critics Week Section

[Mannheim-Heidelberg International Film festival - Best Third World Film (1984)

- Regus London Film Festival (28th)
- National Film Awards (1984) - Second Best Feature Film
- Los Angeles Film Festival
- Odisha State Film Awards (1985) -Best Director, Best Film
- Locarno Film Festival
- Hawaii Film Festival, Special Jury Commendation
