= Niharika Dash =

Indian Odia actress, model

- Occupation: Actress

Niharika Dash is an Indian actress, model & dietitian . She made her debut with the Odia film Tu Kahibu Na Mu. She is the winner of 2nd season of Kie Heba Mo Heroine by Tarang TV. She was last seen in the show Kalijai on Tarang TV, in the title role.
