= Swarup Nayak =

Indian Odiyaan musician and lyricist (1947–2023)

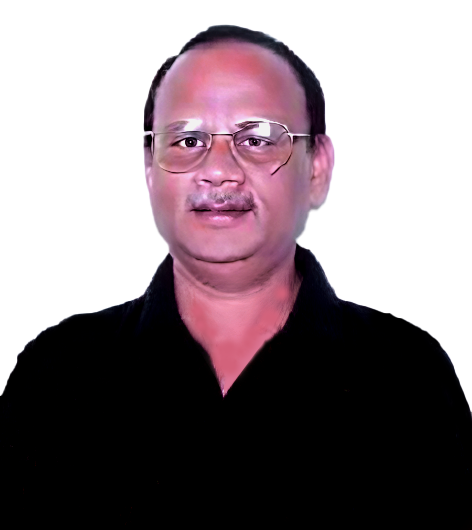
- Born: 8 February 1947; Cuttack, Orissa Province, British India
- Died: 27 October 2023 (aged 76); Kataka, Odisha, India
- Known for: Musician, singer, lyricist, actor
- Spouse: Niharika Sahu
- Relatives: Sarada Prasanna Naik (Brother); Parbati Ghose (Sister)
- Awards: Odisha State Film Awards

Swarup Nayak ([suɔrupɔ najɔkɔ]; 8 February 1947 – 27 October 2023) was an Indian Odiyaan musician, lyricist, screen singer and actor. His film industry career began when he acted as a child in film Jayadeb in 1962.

== Biography ==
Swarup Nayak was born in Cuttack on 8 February 1947. Odia actress Parbati Ghose is his sister and Odia lyricist Sarada Prasanna Naik is their brother.

== Death ==
Nayak died from cancer at a private hospital in Cuttack, on 27 October 2023, at the age of 76.
