= Bhaswati Basu =

Odia actress (born 1973)

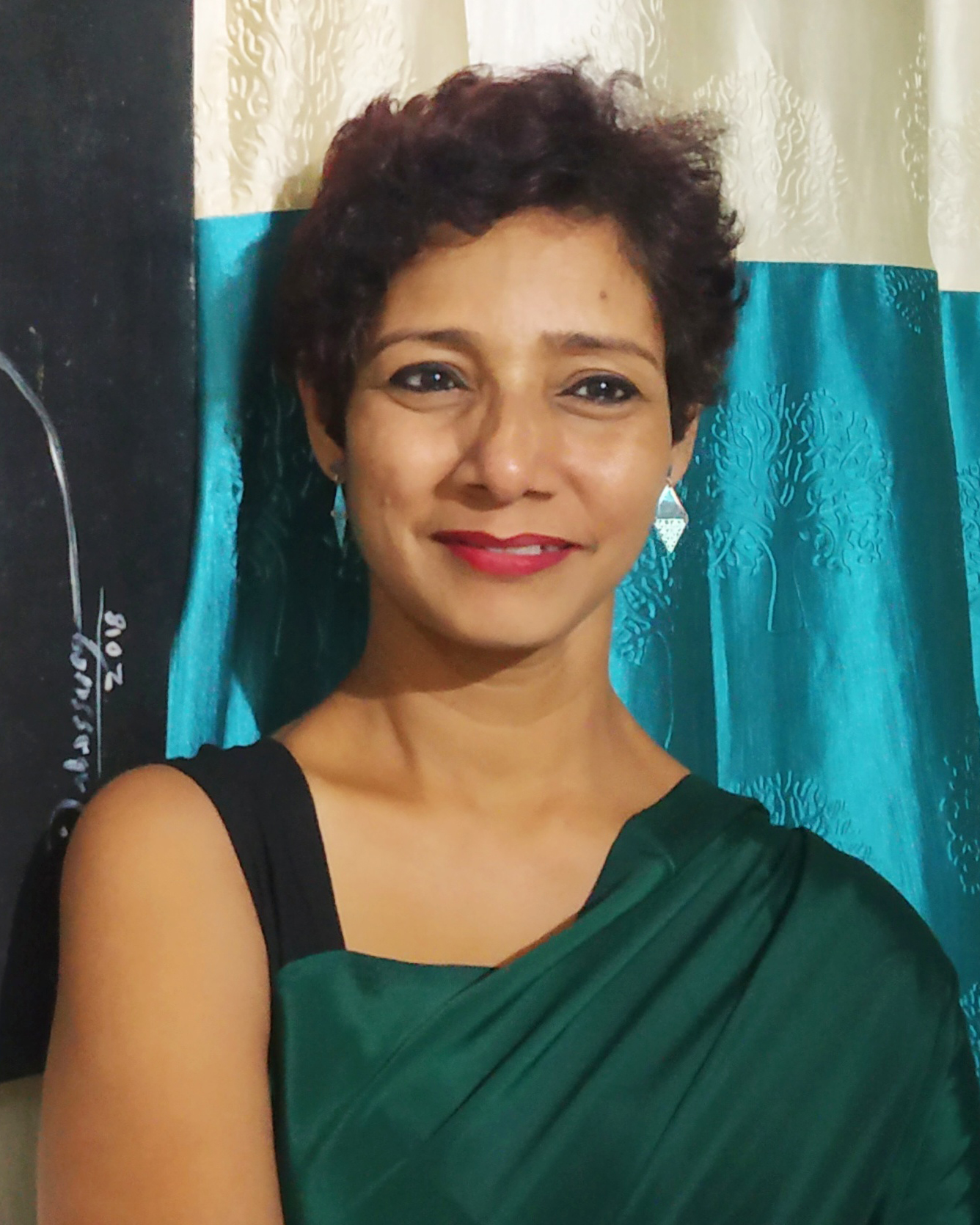
- Born: 5 March 1973 (age 53); Bhubaneswar
- Education: Utkal Sangeet Mahavidyalaya
- Known for: Acting in films, television serials and theatre; poetry
- Spouse: Vijay Mandal
- Children: Dishani
- Parents: Asim Basu (father); Gita Basu (mother)
- Awards: Best Supporting Actress, Odisha State Film Awards (2005)

Signature
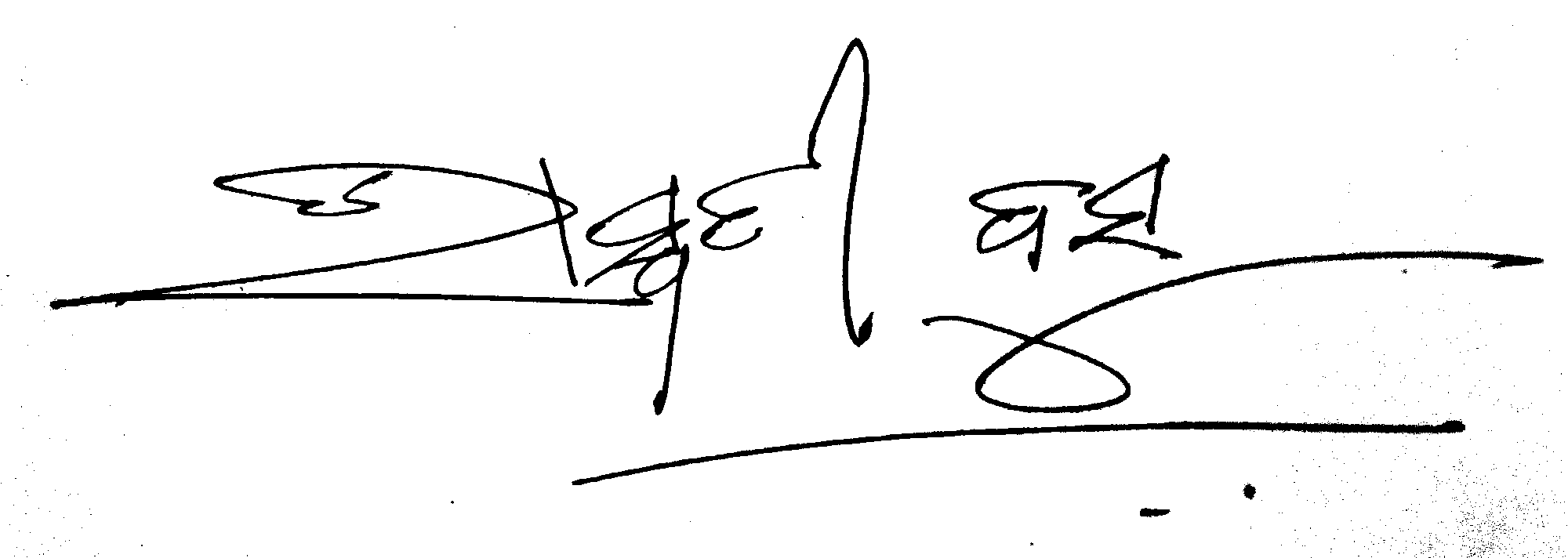

Bhaswati Basu (born 5 March 1973) is an Odia film, television and stage actress, playwright and director. Her notable performances in Odia films include those in Kathantara, recognized as the Best Supporting Actress in the 2005 Odisha State Film Awards, and Khyanikaa: The Lost Idea. Her father is stage and art director Asim Basu.

== Early life and family ==
Bhaswati Basu was born on 5 March 1973 in Bapuji Nagar, Bhubaneswar, Odisha. Her mother is Gita Basu and her father, Asim Basu, renowned painter, actor, director, writer and art director. She has two siblings, Atasi and Gautam. Basu married Vijay Mandal and they have a daughter Dishani.

Basu graduated in drama from Utkal Sangeet Mahavidyalaya. She served as guest faculty at the institute after completing her studies.

== Career ==
=== Films ===
Bhaswati Basu made her acting debut in 2005 with the Odia film Jiwan Mrutyu, directed by Raju Mishra. Her second film was Kathantara, released in 2006 and directed by Himanshu Khatua. Among the eight awards the film won in the 2006 Odisha State Film Awards, her performance in it secured her the Best Supporting Actress award.

Basu also acted in the 2017 film Khyanikaa: The Lost Idea, directed by Amartya Bhattacharyya. The film was featured in Indian Panorama section of the 2017 edition of the International Film Festival of India. It also received critical acclaim at several international film festivals.

Basu also acted in the short film Rasagola, directed by Swaraj Mishra and screened in 2020, that is based on Babuna, a collection of stories of a child growing up in a village in Odisha.

Basu played the role of the mother of the eponymous protagonist in the 2021 film, Kokoli: Fish Out of Water, whose theme was the impact on the Odia fishing community of rising sea levels thanks to climate change.

Phalguna Chaitra, in which Basu essayed a prominent role, was the first Odia film to be released simultaneously in 9 countries, in 2023.

=== Stage ===
Basu began her stage career with the theatre group Satabdira Kalakar, and, notably, has directed plays like Aparna, Dine Ratire, Yada Yada Hi Dharmasya and Tyaga.

Basu starred in over twenty five plays, wrote the script for nineteen productions and directed thirteen.

In 2009, Basu directed Aparna, her adaptation of the Bengali play of the same name by Balai Chand Mukhopadhyay at the Utkal Sangeet Mahavidyalaya. Three years later, she directed Kandhei Ghara, her own translation of the Henrik Ibsen play, A Doll's House, for the institute's Natya Saptah theatre festival.

Basu adapted the Satabdira Kalakar production of Charandas Chor, a famous Habib Tanvir play.

=== Television ===
Basu has acted in several Odia serials.

Title	Telecaster	Director
Ananya	ETV Network	Debananda Nayak
Badhu Nuhen Bandhu	DD Odia	Ajit Das
Sei Kahani	DD Odia	Rajat Paikaraya
Ananya Anupama	DD Odia	Jyoti Prakash
Dharmatma	DD Odia	Gudiya Mahapatra
Nila Mastrani	DD Odia	Sadhu Meher
Budha Sankhari	DD Odia	Tapas Bose
Queen	Tarang TV	
Abujhaa Ae Man	Tarang TV	
Gayatri	ETV Odia	Sudhanshu Sahu
Bhagya Bidhata	ETV Odia	Sudhanshu Sahu
Ashar Aakash	Kalinga TV	
Badhu	Sarthak TV	
Maaya	Tarang TV	
Sinhadwar	Manjari TV	

=== Poetry ===
When her father died in 2017, Basu returned to writing poetry which she occasionally had done in college. Having written 70 poems, she published them as the anthology Bata Abata in 2021

In 2023, another volume of her poems, Raga Malkosh, was published.

=== Other ===
Basu also helped organize the 2018 Asim Utsav, commemorating the first death anniversary of her father, that staged three of his plays. She was in charge of conceptualizing the Odisha Pavilion at the India International Trade Fair in New Delhi. She also organised, along with Subhashree Shubhashmita Mishra, an informal event called Cafetaria, in which litterateurs discuss politics and policy for a young audience.

== Filmography ==
- 2005 Jiwan Mrutyu
- 2006 Kathantara
- 2017 Khyanikaa: The Lost Idea
- 2019 Rasagola
- 2021 Kokoli: Fish Out of Water
- 2023 Phalguna Chaitra
- 2025 Indradhanu

== Bibliography ==
- Basu, Bhaswati (2021). Bata Abata. Barsha Publication, Bhubaneswar, India. pp. 136.
- Basu, Bhaswati (2023). Raga Malkosh. Barsha Publication, Bhubaneswar, India. pp. 88.
