= Amlan Das =

Indian actor

Amlan
- Born: Amlan Das; Cuttack, Odisha, India
- Education: SRM Institute of Science and Technology
- Occupation: Actor
- Years active: 2013–present
- Parent(s): Mihir Das, Sangita Das

Amlan Das is an Odia actor mostly viewed in Ollywood films and advertisements. He is the son of Famous Odia actor Mihir Das. He started his career just after completing his graduation in 2013.

== Biography ==
Amlan was born as the elder son of Mihir Das and Sangita Das at Cuttack. He completed his schooling and college at DAV school, CDA. He joined for his graduation in the Sivaji Ganesan Film Institute of SRM Institute of Science and Technology located in Chennai. In 2013 he completed his graduation and started his film career in the movie Target with direction from SK Muralidharan. But his first performance failed to attract a wider audience. He grew in popularity after appearing in Tu Mo Dehara Chhai but later on he failed to impress the Odia viewers with his performance. He failed to increase his popularity and audience attention due to continuous flop movies.

== Filmography ==
Year	Film	Role	Director	Notes
2013	Target		S.K. Muralidharan	Debut Film
2013	Tu Mo Dehara Chhai		Himanshu Parija	
2014	Golapi Golapi	Aditya	Susant Mani	
2015	Pagala Karichu Tu	Shiba	Susant Mani	
2015	College Time		Sudhansu Mohan Sahoo	
2015	Nua Nua Premare		S.K. Muralidharan	
2016	Tu Kahibu Na Mu		Susant Mani	
2016	Tora Dine Ku Mora Dine		Sudhansu Mohan Sahoo	Remake of Tamil film Drohi
2016	Chini	Manav	Pradeep Bhol	
2016	Tiger		Dilip Panda	Remake of Telugu film Bengal Tiger
2017	Sapanara Pathe Pathe		Sushant Mani	
2017	Bajrangi		Bini Pattnaik	Remake of Tamil film Jilla
2019	From Me To You		Hemanta Kumar Sahoo	
2021	Romeo Raja		Rakesh Samal	
2022	Gupchup		Prithviraj Pattnaik	Remake of Kannada film Love Mocktail
2022	Prasthanam		Raja D	
2023	Malyagiri		Prithviraj Pattnaik	
2025	Bhai - The Opening Part		Prithviraj Pattnaik	
2026	Shikar		Mrutyunjaya Sahoo	
2026	Danger Devdas		Aswin Tripathy	
