= Phalguna Chaitra =

2023 Indian Odia-language film

- Directed by: Sisir Kumar Sahu; Peenakee Singh
- Written by: Pranab Prasanna Rath
- Screenplay by: Pranab Prasanna Rath
- Story by: Sulagna Mohanty
- Produced by: Sakti Jagdev; Babushaan
- Starring: Partha Sarathi Ray; BM Baisali; Ananya Mishra; Choudhury Jayaprakash Das; Sukanta Rath; Bhaswati Basu
- Cinematography: Rudrakant Singh
- Edited by: Rashmi Ranjan Dash
- Music by: Abhishek; Eshan; Kaushik
- Production companies: Aadya Jagdev Films; Babushaan Films
- Release date: 12 May 2023
- Running time: 138 minutes
- Country: India
- Language: Odia

Phalguna Chaitra is a 2023 Indian Odia-language family drama film directed by the duo Sisir Kumar Sahu and Peenakee Singh. It was produced by Sakti Jagdev and Babushaan Mohanty under the banners of Aadya Jagdev Films and Babushaan Films. The story was conceived by Sulagna Mohanty, while Pranab Prasanna Rath penned the screenplay and dialogues.

The film features Partha Sarathi Ray, BM Baisali, and Ananya Mishra in lead roles, alongside Choudhury Jayaprakash Das, Sukanta Rath, and Bhaswati Basu in prominent supporting roles. It was theatrically released on 12 May 2023. At the 35th Odisha State Film Awards, the film won three awards: Best Supporting Actor, Best Screenplay, and Best Costume Designer.

== Cast ==
- Partha Sarathi Ray
- BM Baisali
- Ananya Mishra
- Choudhury Jayaprakash Das
- Sukanta Rath
- Bhaswati Basu
- Pranab Prasanna Rath
- Chandan Biswal
- Manisha Manjari Mishra
- Kailash Panigrahi

== Soundtrack ==
The soundtrack for the film was composed by Abhishek, Eshan, and Kaushik. The lyrics were written by J.P. Wordsmith, Sthita Pattnaik, and Sumit Panda. Vocal performances were rendered by Gaurav Anand, Ananya Sritam Nanda, Kuldeep Pattanaik, Suril Bispute, and Aishwarya Kumar.

Track listing
No.	Title	Lyrics	Singer(s)	Length
1.	"Parichaya Khoje Aji"	Sthita Pattnaik	Gaurav Anand, Ananya Sritam Nanda	4:43
2.	"Sakhi"	J.P. Wordsmith	Gaurav Anand, Ananya Sritam Nanda	4:28
3.	"Khoji Yaere"	Sumit Panda	Kuldeep Pattanaik, Suril Bispute	3:13
4.	"Smruti Bunijaye Jeebane"	J.P. Wordsmith	Aishwarya Kumar	4:50
5.	"Phalguna Chaitra"	Sumit Panda	Gaurav Anand	3:34
Total length:				20:48

== Accolades ==
Award	Category	Recipient(s)	Result	Ref.
35th Odisha State Film Awards (for 2023)	Best Supporting Actor	Choudhury Jayaprakash Das	Won	
35th Odisha State Film Awards (for 2023)	Best Screenplay	Pranab Prasanna Rath	Won	
35th Odisha State Film Awards (for 2023)	Best Costume Designer	Wasidia Tabassum	Won	
