= Himansu Sekhar Khatua =

Indian movie director and journalist

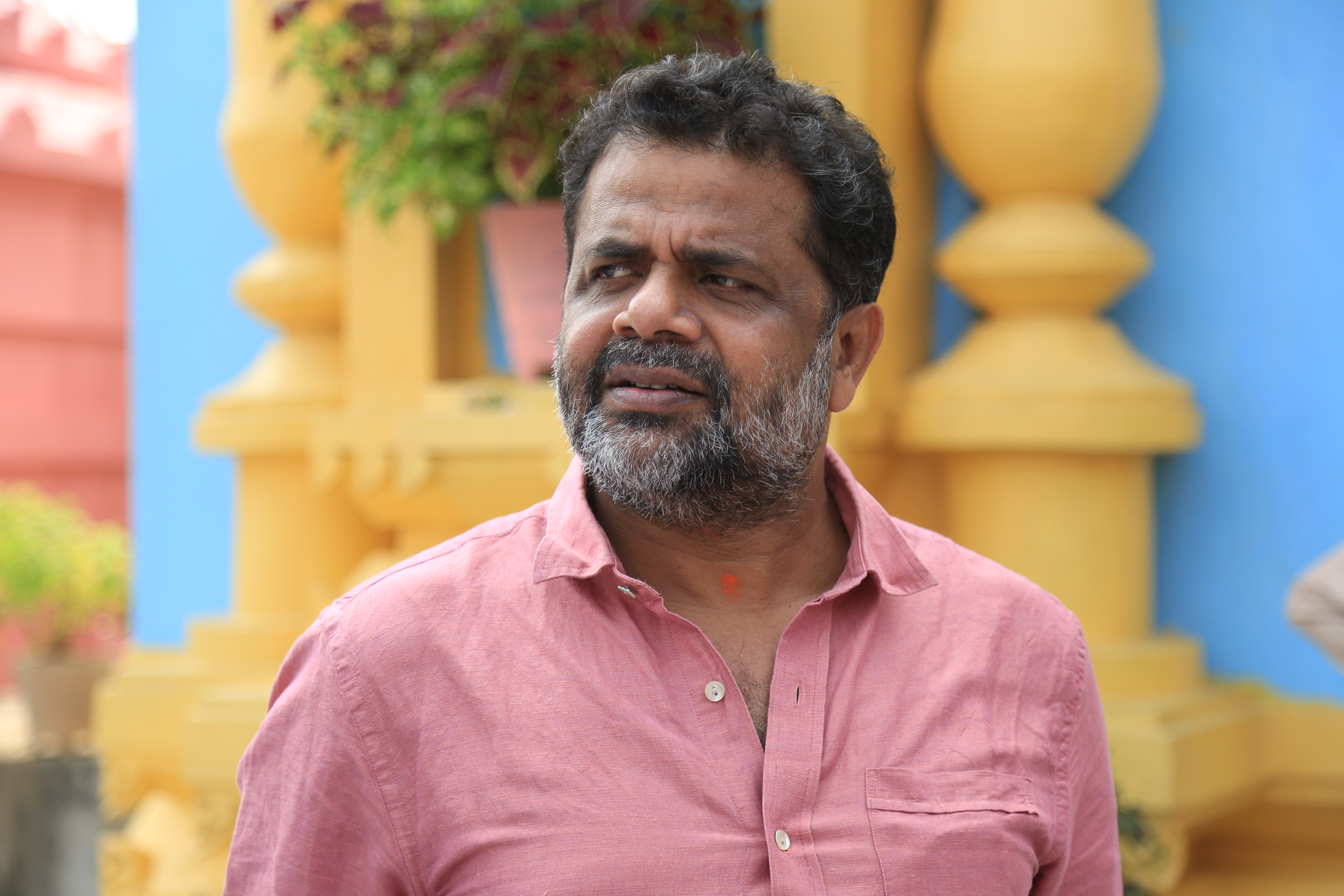
- Born: 21 December 1965 (age 59); Khatuapatna, Bhadrak, Odisha, India
- Occupation: Film Maker
- Spouse: Snehashri Swain
- Children: Anshuman Khatua, Sriman Khatua
- Parent(s): Rabindra Khatua, Kunjalata Khatua

Himansu Sekhar Khatua is an Indian director, educationalist, and journalist. He directed the national film award winning movies Shunya Swaroopa and Kathantara in 1996 and 2005 respectively. He was the previous managing director from the house of Kalinga Media and Entertainment Private Limited (KMEPL) and also the Ex-CMD of Kalinga TV, a news channel and KNews Odisha, a digital platform.

He was instrumental in establishing three schools in KIIT University. Mr Himansu Khatua took the responsibility for establishment of School of Film, School of Fashion and school of Mass Communication. He was holding the position of Director General when he left KIIT University in order to join as Director of Satyajit Ray Film and Television Institute.

Khatua is the National Film Award recipient for Best Film direction in 2005 and National Award recipient for best debut film Shunya Swaroopa in 44th National Film Festival.

== Early life and education ==
Khatua was born in 1965 in Khatuapatna, a remote village in Bhadrak, Odisha. He is the eldest among all siblings of Rabindra Khatua and Smt. Kunjalata Khatua. After his primary education in his native village, he shifted to several places in the state to complete his high school. In fact, his maternal grandfather was his first teacher who taught him languages like Odia, English and Sanskrit during his formative years. It was while pursuing a career in science with Physics major, he qualified to join country's film institute FTII Pune. He has done Diploma in Cinema from Film and Television Institute of India.

== Filmography ==
In 1990s, Khatua moved to Mumbai to work as a professional audiographer, but only after a year, he decided to come back to his homeland Odisha and pursue his career here. Independently, he did sound designing for Indradhanura Chhai (Shadows of the rainbow).

Later, Khatua moved into film direction independently with his debut film Shunya Swaroopa (Contours of the void) which took him to international film festivals including International Film Festival Rotterdam (Netherlands), Kinotavr (Sochi International Film Festival, Russia), Gothenburg Film Festival (Sweden), and Cinema Jove International Film Festival, Valencia (Spain). The Film also got National Award as the Best Regional Film in Oriya, and many state awards.

His second feature film Kathantara (Another Story) based on the aftermath of 1999 Odisha cyclone, a landmark in Odia Cinema, dealt with the lives and predicaments of cyclone survivors mostly the women.

His third film feature Matira Bandhan (The Inheritance) was based on a short story The Trunk of Ganesha by eminent writer Padmashree Jayanta Mahapatra. This couldn't receive certificate from CBFC because of reasons other than artistic credibility. However, the film was screened at the Mumbai Film Festival organized by Mumbai Academy of Moving Image (MAMI) and Bangaluru International Film Festival.

The fourth feature film Krantidhara (Coup de grace) based on the story Jhada Parara Surjya by Dr Itirani Samanta, got Asian Excellence Awards, South Korea as the best feature film. It also got Best Feature Film Award along with several other state film awards.

Now Khatua is working on the Biopic of Dutee Chand the sprinter.

=== Television ===
- 'Prayaschit' (Penance)
- 'Abhisapta Jarayu' (Cursed Womb by Akhil Mohan Pattnaik)
- 'Bhagnansha'
