= Mana Akasha =

- Theatrical poster
- Directed by: Nitai Palit
- Written by: Basant Mahapatra
- Screenplay by: Nitai Palit
- Produced by: Ras Bihari Misra
- Starring: Shanti Swaroop Misra; Prashant Nanda; Chandana; Bhanumati Debi; Dhira Biswal; Gobind Tej; Nityananda Misra
- Cinematography: Krishna Chakraborty
- Edited by: Ramesh Joshi
- Music by: Upendra Kumar
- Distributed by: Ideal Distributor
- Release date: 8 December 1974
- Running time: 167 min
- Country: India
- Language: Odia

Mana Akasha is a 1974 Oriya film directed by Nitai Palit based on Basant Mahapatra's Novel Jhara Baula. The film portrays socio-economic conflicts in rural Odisha.

== Plot ==
Sashank Patnaik and Rudra Choudhury are close friends. Rudra's son Bhanu develops love relationship with Sashank's daughter Mala. After demise of Rudra, Sashank tries to acquire the properties of Rudra. In spite of knowing Mala is pregnant and Bhanu is her lover, Sasank tries to kill Bhanu by giving poison to be the owner of the whole property. But later on Sashank realizes his mistake helps unite Bhanu and Mala.

== Cast ==
- Shanti Swaoop Misra... Bhanu Pratap
- Prashant Nanda... Srikant
- Dhira Biswal... Sashank Patnaik
- Gobind Tej... Rudra Choudhury
- Chandana... Mala
- Bhanumati Debi... Mala's mother
- Narendra Behera
- Shyamalendu Bhatacharjee
- Bhim Singh

== Soundtrack ==
| Track | Song | Singer(s) | Composer | lyric |
|---|---|---|---|---|
| 1 | "Mora Kania Suna Pania" | Chitta Ranjan Jena & S. Janaki | Upendra Kumar | Shibabrata Das |
| 2 | "Bahuchhe Hure Huria Dhuka Phutichhe Phula" | Sikandar Alam & Purnaprabha Bahidar | Upendra Kumar | Ras Bihari Misra |
| 3 | "E Bana Jharana Nachi Nachi Jaa Na" | Chitta Ranjan Jena, Sikandar Alam & Purnaprabha Bahidar | Upendra Kumar | Shibabrata Das |
| 4 | "Mora Phula Bali" | Mohini Mohan Rath & Purnaprabha Bahidar | Upendra Kumar | Shibabrata Das |
