= Nila Masterani =

1996 Indian Odia-language film

- Directed by: Chakradhar Sahu
- Story by: Godabarish Mohapatra; Chakradhar Sahoo
- Produced by: Rabi Ratha
- Starring: Minaketan; Priyanka Mahapatra
- Edited by: Chandrasekhar Sahu
- Music by: Malay Mishra
- Release date: 1996
- Country: India
- Language: Odia

Nila Masterani is an Odia feature film released in 1996. This film was produced by Rabi Ratha and written by Godabarisha Mohapatera and Chakradhar Sahu. This comic was also directed by Chakradhar Sahu.

Meenaketan Das and Priyanka Mahapatra have acted in different roles in this feature film.

== Cast ==
- Minaketan Das
- Priyanka Mahapatra

== Songs and music ==
In this film, music is directed by Malay Mishra.

== Awards ==
In 1997 this film was awarded with 5 state awards. Special Jury Award, Best Script, Best recording, Best story & Best Acting.
