= Ratikant Satpathy =

Indian music director (born 1970)

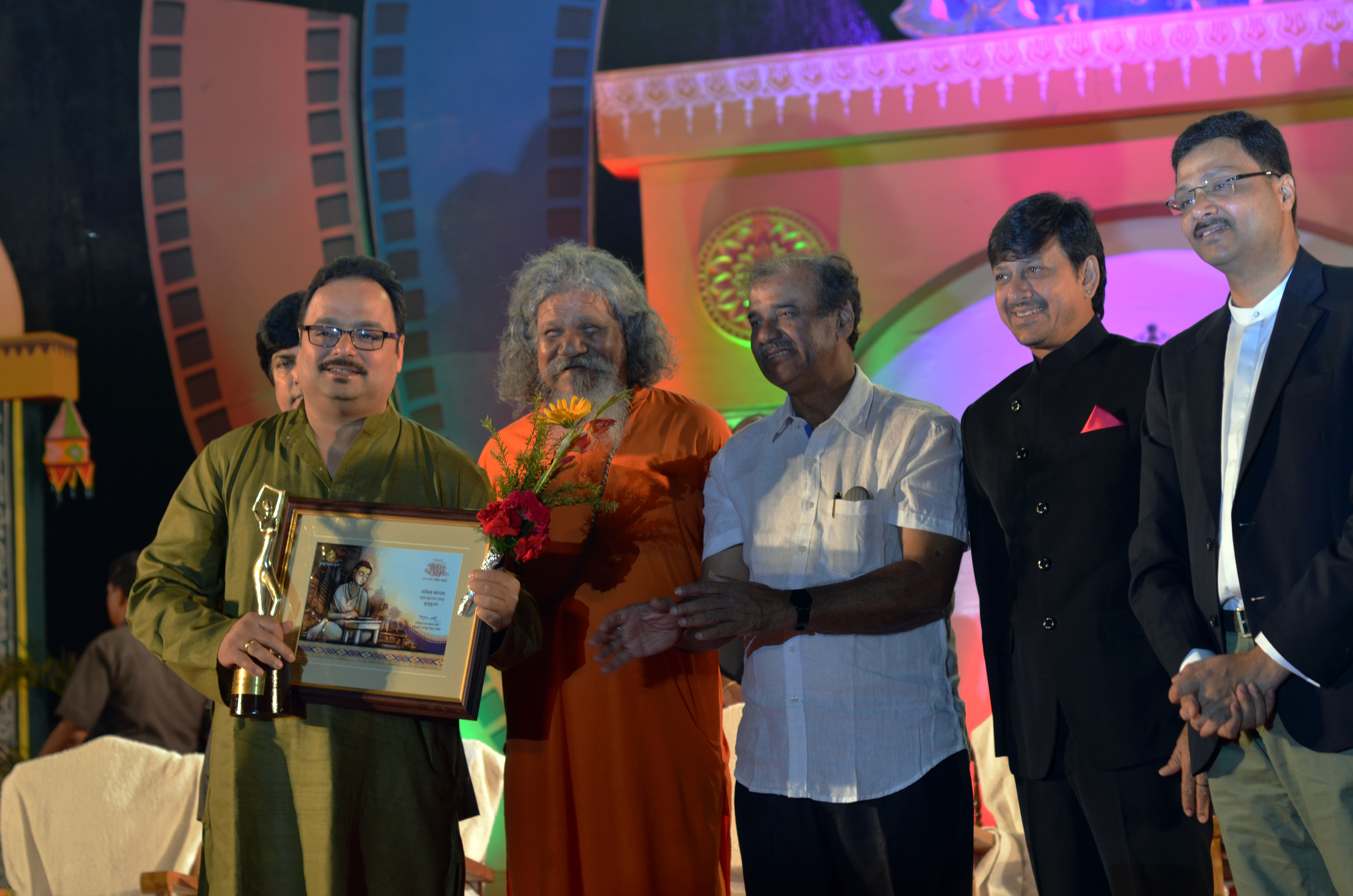
- Ratikant Satpathy being awarded the 2014 Odisha State Film Awards
- Born: 27 October 1970 (age 55); Cuttack, Odisha
- Education: Utkal University; Indian Institute of Management Ahmedabad
- Occupations: Singer; songwriter; composer; music director

Ratikant Satpathy (born 27 October 1970) is an Indian Odia-language playback singer and music director. Born in Cuttack, Odisha, he began his career as a playback singer and then started composing and directing songs for Odia cinema. He was a winner of Odisha State Film Awards for best male playback singer in 2008 for Odia film Bhagya Chakra, and in 2014 for the movie Rumku Jhumana. Satpathy was the assistant vice-president and then vice president at Odisha TV.
