= Bijoy Ketan Mishra =

Director of Odian art films in Orissa, India

- Born: 1959 (age 66–67)
- Occupations: Film Director, Media Professional
- Spouse: Suravi Mishra

Bijoy Ketan Mishra is a director of art films in Odia, in Orissa, India. He is also an independent media production professional. He is the Resident Editor of the Orissa edition of the Newspaper, Political and Business Daily.

Mishra's maiden directional effort is Ahalya (The Words of Silence), a movie depicting the mute suffering of a hapless woman, widowed in her childhood. The movie is based on a short story in Oriya of the same name written by Laxmipriya Acharya.

Ahalya came to limelight when it was picked up by the jury of 30th Indian Film Festival of India for its Indian Panorama section in feature film category. The screening of Ahalya during the festival was met with positive response from the international audience. Subsequently, the movie has been shown in many other festivals, most recently at the SPARROW festival in Mumbai, under the 'One River Many Streams' category.

Mishra was born in 1959 in Cuttack district of Orissa. He has completed his graduation from Ravenshaw College, Cuttack and post graduation from University of Delhi, Delhi in psychology. Mishra has produced many documentary films in the last 15 years, the most notable being "Sachi Raut Roy" for Sahitya Akademi. He is making a biographical film on Pandit Gopabandhu Das, Orissa's renowned social worker, educationist and politician. Mishra edits an Oriya features magazine 'Orissa Now' in both print and web formats. He has edited a book of features on Orissa named 'Orissa File: Making Sense of a State in Motion.' Other notable books edited by him are "Editor's Time Capsule" (2013) and "Turning Tides – An Insightful Miscellany" (2024). Mishra has attended workshops and seminars in India, Japan and Sri Lanka.

Mishra lives in Bhubaneswar with his wife, a son and a daughter.

== Filmography ==
- Ahalya (The Words of Silence)
