= Aw Aaakare Aa =

2003 Indian Odia-language film

- Directed by: Subash Das
- Written by: Subash Das
- Produced by: Subash Das
- Starring: Adyasha Mohapatra; Dipti Panda
- Cinematography: Jugal Debata
- Edited by: Gadadhar Puty
- Music by: Bidyadhar Sahu
- Distributed by: Om Films
- Release date: 27 September 2003
- Running time: 90 minute
- Country: India
- Language: Odia

Aw Aaakare Aa is a 2003 Indian Oriya film directed by Subash Das. This film reflects change in the present education system and projected another very sensitive issue – the drudgery and defeatism of modern education system.

== Synopsis ==
This is the story of a school teacher, Mini. Her efforts to change the conventional pattern of education creates hurdles in her own career. Without being able to compromise, she is frequently transferred from one school to another. Her only solace is her childhood memory which surfaces time and again. Finally Mini does not reconcile with the present educational system, resigns and starts her own school where there are no four-walls and no regimentation.

== Cast ==
- Adyasha Mohapatra as Mini (Childhood)
- Dipti Panda as Mini (Adulthood)

== Music ==
Bidyadhar Sahu has arranged music for this film.

== Awards & Participation ==
- National Film Awards, India(2004) -Best Odia film
- Orissa State Film Awards, (2003) – Best film, Best Direction, Best Child actress and best editing
- 13th Golden Elephant International Children's Film Festival
- International Film Festival at Jamshedpur (Children's section).
