= Aranya Rodan =

- Directed by: Biplab Ray Chaudhuri
- Written by: Saatkadi Hota
- Produced by: Prasan Prusti
- Starring: Priyambada Ray; Sarat Pujari; Rai Charan Das; Lalatendu Rath
- Cinematography: Raju Mishra
- Edited by: Biplab Ray Chaudhuri
- Music by: Shantanu Mohapatra
- Distributed by: Gouri Pictures
- Release date: 1993
- Running time: 90 minutes
- Country: India
- Language: Odia

Aranya Rodan (English Cry in the wildness), is a 1993 Indian Odia film directed by Biplab Ray Chaudhuri, based on the novel Ashanta Arayana by Odia writer Satakadi Hota. The film was selected for the Indian Panorama at the International Film Festival of India.

== Synopsis ==
Kalyani (Priyambada Ray) is a journalist, who is investigating the rape and subsequent murder of a tribal woman by a police man in rural Orissa. She adopts the child of the dead woman and starts getting involved with the tribals' lives even as her own married life has its share of problems.

== Cast ==
- Pariyambada Ray
- Sarat Pujari
- Lalatendu Rath
- Raicharan Das
- Ma. Ramdas
- Murmu

== Music ==
- Shantunu Mahapatra – Music
- Laxman Marandi – Lyricist
- Sarojini Hembrum – Playback
