= Golapi Golapi =

- Directed by: Susant Mani
- Screenplay by: Susant Mani
- Story by: Sidharth Agarwal
- Produced by: Sitaram Agrawal
- Starring: Amlan Das; Riya Dey; Siddhanta Mahapatra; Aparajita Mohanty; Mihir Das
- Cinematography: Sitansu Mohapatra
- Production company: Sarthak Entertainment Pvt Ltd
- Release date: 13 June 2014
- Country: India
- Language: Odia

Golapi Golapi is a 2014 Odia film directed by Susant Mani. It stars Amlan Das and Riya Dey in lead roles while Siddhanta Mahapatra and Aparajita Mohanty play supporting roles.

== Cast ==
- Amlan Das as Aditya
- Mihir Das as Aditya's Father
- Deepani as Rashmi
- Riya Dey as Shweta
- Jagyaseni as Jinni
- Siddhanta Mahapatra as Love Guru Prem
- Meenakshi as Aditya's Mother
- Aparajita Mohanty as Shweta's Mother
- Prutiviraj Nayak as Shweta's Father
- Jiban Panda as Lecturer

== Music ==
- Music Director - Bikash Das
- Music Coordinator - Prafulla Behera
- Lyricist - Srikant Gautam
- Male Vocals - Udit Narayan, Babul Supriyo, Krishna Beura and Vinod Rathod
- Female Vocals - Nivedita

=== Track listing ===
1. Golapi Golapi (Title Song)
2. Sima Deingale
3. Sata Bhala Paiba Re
4. Rangila Rangila
5. Jharaphula
6. Nija Rakta
7. E Ki Chhuaan
