= Chini (film) =

- Directed by: Pradeep Bhol
- Screenplay by: Pradeep Bhol
- Story by: Pradeep Bhol
- Produced by: Bhabani Majhi & Snehalata Parida
- Starring: Amlan Das; Patrali; Anil Kumar Patel; Mahasweta Ray; Mihir Das
- Music by: Shankar Pradhan & Hemant Pandey
- Release date: 2016
- Country: India
- Languages: Odia; Sambalpuri

Chini is a 2016 Indian Odia and Sambalpuri language drama film directed by Pradeep Bhol and produced by Bhabani Majhi & Snehalata Parida. The film is made under the banner of Navajiban Films. It stars Amlan Das and Patrali in lead roles while Mahasweta Ray and Mihir Das play supporting roles. Well known playback singer Asha Bhosle sang a Sambalpuri number in the upcoming Odia film "Chini" with a western Odisha flavour. Asha has sung "Uanshar andhare nai dishe sina, haji nai jai jan", in Odia language "uaansha ratire dise nahin sina haji jae nahin jaha" (One can't see, but moon very much exists even during the new moon day), penned by Durga Madhab Panda and singer Tapu Mishra for the film. This film won the state film award for best film in 2016.

== Plot ==
The story is about a small family of Khira Nayak (Mihir Das), Pani Nayak (Mahasweta Ray) and their three children Chaha, Pati and Chini, who live in Vikhampur village. Manav (Amlan Das) comes to the village as a doctor and falls in love with Jagi (Patrali). They were all living happily until one day when Chini fell sick. That is when nothing went in Khira Nayak's way. The movie is about their struggle.

== Cast ==
- Amlan Das as Manav
- Patrali as Jagi
- Mahasweta Ray as Pani Nayak
- Mihir Das as Khira Nayak
- Ashrumochan
- Anil kumar patel
