= Kathantara =

- Directed by: Himansu Sekhar Khatua
- Written by: Himansu Sekhar Khatua
- Produced by: Iti Rani Samanta
- Starring: Anu Chowdhury; Bhaswati Basu; Rasesh Mohanty; Bedaprasad Dash
- Cinematography: Sameer Mahajan
- Edited by: Rabi Pattnaik
- Music by: Swarup Nayak
- Distributed by: Kadambinee Media Pvt. Ltd
- Release date: 14 December 2007
- Running time: 116 minutes
- Country: India
- Languages: Odia, Bengali

Kathantara (English: Another Story) is a 2007 Indian Oriya language disaster film directed by Himansu Khatua, a story of tribulations of the 1999 Odisha cyclone. Much before the Tsunami became a household name all over the world, the coastal belts of Orissa were hit by what has come to be known as the "Super Cyclone" that killed more than 10,000 people and rendered still more homeless.

== Synopsis ==
Kathantara, a feature film in Oriya language, is an attempt to throw light on the trials and tribulations of 1999 Orissa cyclone survivors with particular emphasis on Kalpana (Anu Chowdhury), a young widow. Kalpana’s destiny is followed from different perspective and a tale of human predicament is built around her. The films narrative unfolds with the anniversary function of 1999 Super Cyclone that devastated coastal Orissa. This was one of the most severe cyclones of the last century. It had caused absolute havoc, leaving thousands dead and many more thousands homeless and destitute. The worst affected was the Bengali Hindu refugee settlement. Aids and relief came pouring in. So also came NGOs, media persons, politicians, and vested-interest groups. With so much external influence the local value system got affected, corruption and amoral practices became rampant. Dipankar, a TV Journalist from Bangladesh, is engaged in documenting the cyclone anniversary and the status of the post-cyclone survivors. With the help of an NGO group he covers the programme, and hears a great deal about Kalpana — the much publicised cyclone widow. Dipankar takes a keen interest on her and wants to do a special feature.

The genesis of Kalpana’s ordeal is rooted in history. Like others in that locality her father a forced migrant from East Bengal during the partition of India, struggled all his life to establish his identity, even though he was a citizen of his adopted homeland. Kalpana born and brought up in coastal Orissa, was leading a harmonious life with her fisherman husband. As they were dreaming to add more colours into their life, the infamous super cyclone of October 1999 strikes. It leaves all her family member dead. Kalpana miraculously survives. And, with the support of her childhood friend Akshaya, she limps back to a life now full of emptiness. The links with her past being snapped off, Kalpana feels alienated in her own native place. A sense of dispossession engulfs her. Kalpana tired with her own struggle and very much bitter at the meaningless publicity made out of her, firmly refuses Dipankar for an interview. Disappointed, he returns to his own country without the story he wanted to do on Kalpana. Kalpana lives an isolated life with an uncertain future. She does small job with the support of local NGO and fights to safeguard her dignity from the lusts of society. Kalpana’s life is limited to ceaseless follow up with the government officials for the death compensation package.

Dipankara makes a repeat visit without his camera unit and he just wants to meet Kalpana. He is fascinated with her innocence, beauty and determination. He shares with her lot of things about himself, about his people and the life out there in Dhaka. He also learns about Kalpana and wants to put an end to her suffering. It becomes difficult on Kalpana’s part to reconcile in settling down with a person she hardly knows. Yet again, she is fed up with this place with bleak prospect. The frustration of the never ending follow-up for compensation money, the anguish of being treated as women of loose virtue by village youths, and the illicit advances by Rupa’s husband makes Kalpana insecured. Rupa, also believes how difficult it is for a single woman, especially a young and good looking widow to cope up with her present situation. She insists upon Kalpana to settle down with Dipankar in Bangladesh — the land of her forefathers.

A brief stay in Kolkata prior to crossing the border becomes a revealing moment in Kalpana’s life. She realises she will be a misfit in the far off urban setting of Dhaka and would suffer further alienation. The memories of her homeland, of her childhood, of all that she had and all that she lost will haunt her for the rest of her life. She longs to return to her village. She also reconciles to the fact that Dipankar, in spite of all his concern and support, is just another ambitious journalist whose priority is his career. He sees everything from the point of view of news and story. Right now she is a hot subject for Dipankar, he can get lot of publicity if he marries her.

The scene in her village is different-now. The improper eviction process for the immigrants from Bangladesh is in full swing. People are being served deportation notices to leave the country within thirty days. There is a large scale resentment, unrest and protest-rally by the affected people to assert their rights and belongingness to the adopted homeland. Kalpana unaware of the happenings returns to her home and to her own people. Despite all the adversities, stigma and grim prospect she could breathe freely in the land which forever belongs to her. But, as soon as she lands up in her village she is also served with the deportation notice. Kalpana now determined to stay back, takes a surprise bold step to reclaim her rights to live in the land of her birth. When she comes back to the village Kalpana realizes, quite conveniently, that Akshaya, the simple village guy who had saved her is the actual love of her life and implores him to ‘save’ her by marrying her. This is a major letdown in her characterization and is quite a regressive moment; as a result it fails to alleviate her in the eyes of the viewers at the end.

== Cast ==
- Anu Chowdhury as Kalpana, a cyclone widow
- Bhaswati Basu as Rupa
- Rasesh Mohanty as Akshaya
- Bedaprasad Das as Deepankar
- Choudhury Bikash Das as Bikash
- Mihir Swain as the late husband of Kalpana
- Mamuni Mishra
- George Tiadi
- Surya Mohanty
- Ananta Mohapatra
- Choudhury Jayaprakash Das
- Bidyutprava Devi
- Chakradhara Jena

== Credits ==
- Director – Himansu Khatua
- Story – Himansu Khatua
- Producer – Itirani Samanta
- Composer – Swarup Nayak
- Cinematographer – Sameer Mahajan
- Editor – Ravi Patnaik
- Art – Amiya Maharana

== Awards ==
Kathantara went on to win several awards at the 2006 Orissa State Film Awards, including the Best feature film of the year prize, and at the National Film Award for Best Feature Film in Oriya

- Orissa State Film Awards
  - Best feature film of the year 2006
  - Best Director & Best Story - Himanshu Khatua
  - Best Music Director - Swaroop Nayak
  - Best Photography - Sameer Mahajan
  - Best Audiography - Manas Chaudhry & Gitimugdha Sahani
  - Best Supporting Actress - Bhaswati Basu
  - Best Supporting Actor - Hadu
- National Film Award
  - Best featured film in Oriya

== Music ==
Swarup Nayak has arranged the musical score and written the lyric for this film.
