= Nizam (lyricist) =

Lyricist in the Odia movie industry

Mohammad Nizam
- Born: 2 October 1951; Sutahat, Cuttack, India
- Died: 21 September 2015 (aged 63); Bhubaneswar, India
- Resting place: Darghaa Bazzar, Cuttack
- Education: Mission School, Khrist College
- Known for: Odia Lyricist
- Spouse: Gulsar Haaraa
- Children: 2
- Awards: Odisha State Movie Award

Mohammad Nizam (2 October 1951 – 21 September 2015) was a lyricist in the Odia movie industry. Nizam's songs appeared in over 160 movies. He was a screenwriter for over 50 movies and television shows, as well as providing scripts for over 70 stage shows.

== Early life ==
Nizam was born on 2 October 1951 in Sutaahat, Cuttack; his father was Aasad Naazim. He started as a football player for Odisha and played for ten years. He later received a job in Postal Accounts for his talent in sports.

== Musical career ==
Nizam began his career writing songs for the Odia movie Anutap, which included the popular song "Nida bharaa raati madhujharaa janha". Following Anutap, he gained further success with his work for the movies Samar Salim Saaiman, Maanini, and Phula Chandana. Nizam received the Best Singer Award at the State Movie Awards for the movies Rajnigandha (1989), Jeebana Sathee (1997) and Lakshmi Baramma. His first song, "Saharara bati galaani libhi", was telecast on Yuvabaanee programmes from Akashvaani Katak in 1968 and 1969. Nizam used to write devotional songs for Lord Jagannath, otherwise known as "Sala Beg", said film director Sanjay Nayak in 1969.

== Death ==
Nizam died on 21 September 2015 while being treated at Apollo hospital. His family claimed that Nazim's body was held for hours after his death to inflate the hospital bill. He was cremated at Dargha Bazar, Cuttack.

=== List of movies with his songs ===
Movie	Release year
Baalungaa Tokaa	2011
Chori Chori Mana Chori	2011
Hero	2011
Mana Mora Prajaapati	2011
Tu Tha Mu Jauchi Rushi	2010
Om Namah Sivaya	2010
Ei Milana Yuga Yugara	2010
Mu Kana Ete Kharaap	2010
Subha Vivaaha	2010
Don	2010
Tume Hin Saathee Mora	2010
Keun Duniaaru Aasila Bandhu	2009
Dream Girl	2009
Aare Sathee Aa	2009
Mate Ta Love Helaare	2008
Anutap	1977

== Awards ==
- Best singer (State Movie Award)
- Sikandar Award
- Yadumani Das Memorial Talent Award
- National Art Talent Award
- Akshyaya Mohanty Foundation Award
