= Puja Pain Phulatie =

Pooja Pain Phulatie
- Directed by: Gadadhar Puty
- Written by: Gadadhar Puty
- Produced by: Padmini Puty
- Starring: Adyasha Mahapatra; Sarat Pujari; Akankshya Kabi; Sumanta Mani
- Cinematography: Jugal Debata
- Edited by: Gadadhar Puty
- Music by: Vikash Das
- Release date: 2007
- Running time: 96 minute
- Country: India
- Language: Odia

Pooja Pain Phulatie (English: A rose for Pooja) is a 2007 Indian Odia film, directed by Gadadhar Puty.The film has won the National Film Awards for Best Feature Film in Odia in 2006.

== Synopsis ==
Pooja, an orphan, is brought up in a brickyard with her grandfather. She is excellent in her studies and co curricular activities. The owner of the brickyard takes her to his city house for higher studies but his wife engages Pooja as a domestic hand and does not allow her to go to school. A strong bond develops between her spoilt daughter, Mickey and Pooja. Within a short time Pooja transforms Mickey into an all round champion. One day Pooja hurt her leg. Mickey did all her work and helped her friend. When the friendship reaches a peak level, Pooja is driven out from their house. Pooja went back to the village to meet her grandfather. When she heard that he is dead broken she lived at a temple. She was later treated and adopted by a doctor. Years later these two tender hearts meet: Mickey with eye injury and Pooja to help her without revealing her identity. She acted as a deaf and mute. Mickey's condition aggravates and Pooja prays almighty for Mickey at the cost of her life. Pooja dies of cancer and donates her eyes for Mickey. She searched for Pooja everywhere. She later realises that Pooja is dead and Mickey sees the light of the world through Pooja's eyes.

== Cast ==
- Adyasha Mahapatra as Pooja
- Sarat Pujari as Patient
- Akankshya Kabi as Mickey
- Naina Das as Lady doctor
- Sumanta Mani as Doctor
- Soumen Pujari as Mickey's father
- Lisa Mohanty as Mickey's mother
- Rushi Pattanaik as Rushia
- Narayan Chandra Raymohapatra as pooja's grandfather

== Award & Participation ==
- 54th National Film Awards (India) - (Best Feature Film in Odia)
- Odisha State Film Awards - (Best Film, Best Direction, Best Story Best Cinematography, Best Child Artist, & Best Female Playback Singer)
- 5th International Film Festival of Thrissur

== Review ==
The film revolve around a 13-year-old girl, her love and friendship, and the turmoil she faces in relationships. Her inchoate awakening to the complexities of life and living forms the staple in and around Bhubaneswar.
