= Mate Bohu Kari Nei Jaa =

- Theatrical poster
- Directed by: Bikash Das
- Written by: Jyostna Misra Priyadarshan
- Screenplay by: Bikash Das
- Produced by: Gyana Ranjan Priyadarshan
- Starring: Siddhanta Mahapatra; Dipen; Mihir Das; Malabika Bhatacharya; Aishwarya Pathi; Aparajita Mohanty; Raza Murad
- Cinematography: Rabindra Behera
- Edited by: Chandra Sekhar Mishra
- Music by: Bikash Sukla
- Release date: 3 April 2011
- Country: India
- Language: Odia

Mate Bohu Kari Nei Jaa is a 2011 Odia film written and directed by Bikash Das. It is about Odias who are rooted to their culture even after being out of the country for decades.

== Plot ==
The story is based on two families living in Bangkok.

== Cast ==
- Siddhanta Mahapatra
- Dipen
- Aishwarya Pathi
- Malabika Bhatacharya
- Mihir Das
- Raza Murad
- Hadu
- Aparajita Mohanty
- Pushpa Panda
- Asrumochan Mohanty

== Soundtrack ==
Track	Song	Singer(s)	Composer	lyric
1	Ete bhala pao nahin	Suresh Wadkar	Bikash Shukla	Bijay Malla
2	Thiri Thiri Chori Chori	Abhijeet, Kavita Krishnamurthy	Bikash Shukla	Nizam
3	Aame kana tama pain fit nuhan ki,	Udit Narayan	Bikash Shukla	Nizam
4	Agana tora dakuchi mate	Ira Mohanty	Bikash Shukla	Panchanan Nayak
5	Hasibaara michha abhinaya	Ira Mohanty	Bikash Shukla	Panchanan Nayak
6	Gotie chitthi dui thikana	Ira Mohanty	Bikash Shukla	Panchanan Nayak
