= Raju Mishra =

Indian cinematographer (died 2020)

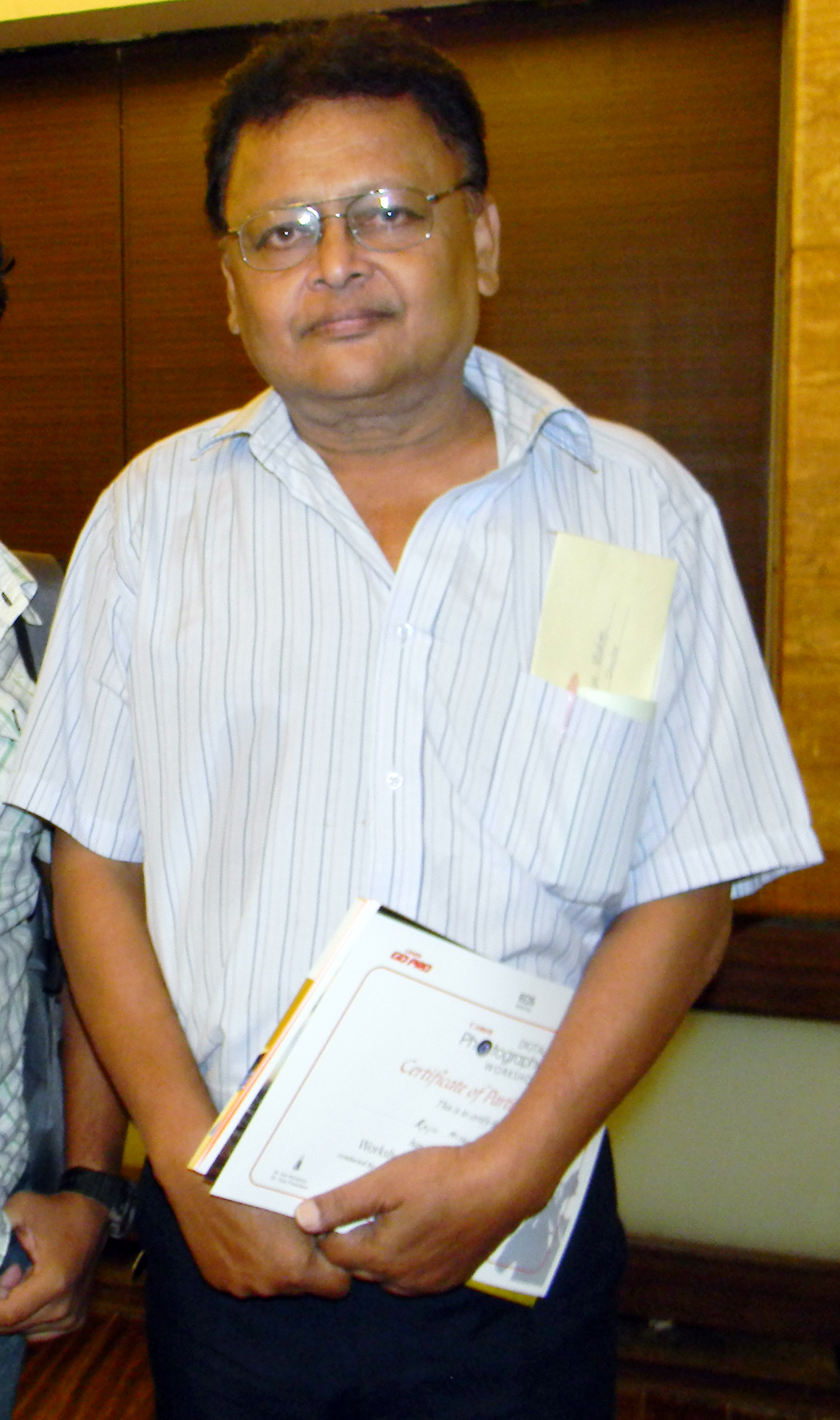
- Born: Raj Gopal Mishra; Jatani, Khordha
- Died: 2 November 2020; Bhubaneswar
- Occupation(s): Odia film director, screen writer, actor, music director
- Years active: 1978–2020
- Spouse: Pratima Manjari Mishra
- Awards: Jayadev Award

Raja Mishra (died 2 November 2020) was an Odia film director, actor, screen writer, cinematographer and music director. He was a gold medalist in cinematography from Film and Television Institute of India, Pune. In 1986 he directed his first Odia film Jor Jar Mulak Tar and he directed a total of 12 Odia films. He also directed seven Assamese language films.

== Film career ==
Mishra debuted in the Odia film industry as an actor through Ulka in 1981. Later he did the cinematography, wrote the screenplay, worked as an editor, and composed music for some Odia films.

Some successful movies like 'Chaka Akhi Sabu Dekhuchi', 'Asuchi Mo Kalia Suna', 'Pua Mora Kala Thakura', 'Hari Bhai Harena' and 'Jibana Mrutyu' are directed by Raju Mishra.

=== Filmography ===
Year	Film	Language	Role
	Sudama Into The Thirsty Night: Best Student Film award at the Indian Panorama	English	Director
1978	Sarvasakshi	Marathi	Assistant cinematographer
1981	Ulka	Odia	Actor, Co-Director, Music Composer
1984	Maya Miriga	Odia	Cinematographer
1986	Jor Jar Mulak Tar	Odia	Director
1987	Chaka Aakhi Sabu Dekhuchi	Odia	Director
1989	Asuchi Mo Kalia Suna	Odia	Director
1988	Pua Moro Kala Thakura	Odia	Director
1988	Rupa Gaan Ra Suna Kania	Odia	Director
1993	Pathara Khasuchi Bada Deulu	Odia	Director
1994	Sagar Ganga	Odia	Director
1997	Kaal Sandhya	Hindi	Cinematographer
1998	Singha Bahini	Odia	Director
1998	Laxmi Ra Abhisara	Odia	Director
1999	Bukur Majot Jole	Assamese	Cinematographer
2000	Hari Bhai Harena	Odia	Director
2003	Sata Michha	Odia	Director
2004	Laaz	Assamese	Cinematographer
2005	Jiwan Mrutyu	Odia	Director
2006	Joymoti	Assamese	Cinematographer
2008	Aai Kot Nai	Assamese	Cinematographer

== Awards ==
- Jayadev Award, 2012
- Fitfat Biscope Award, 2012
- Guru Kelucharan Mohapatra Award, 2020

== Death ==
Mishra died on 2 November 2020 due to cardiac arrest at the age of 72.
