= Bou (film) =

1998 Indian Odia-language film

- VCD cover
- Directed by: Sabyasachi Mohapatra
- Written by: Sabyasachi Mohapatra
- Produced by: Sabyasachi Mohapatra
- Starring: Mahasweta Roy; Bijay Mohanty; Siddhanta Mahapatra, Mihir Das, Usasi Misra, Jyoti Misra
- Cinematography: Aum Prakash Mohapatra
- Edited by: A. Sreekar Prasad
- Music by: Ramesh Mahananda
- Production company: Kumar Pictures
- Release date: 28 July 1998
- Running time: 158 min
- Country: India
- Language: Odia

Bou (English : Mother) is a 1998 Indian Odia-language drama film. It was directed, produced and written by Sabyasachi Mohapatra. Usasi Misra, Jyoti Misra and Akshaya Bastia debuted in the film.

== Synopsis ==
Umakant (Bijay Mohanty) and Durga (Mahasweta Roy) lives happily with two sons Deepak (Siddhanta Mahapatra) and Amar (Akshaya Bastia) and daughter-in-law Seema (Usasi Misra), the wife of Deepak. Umakant does everything for his children's better up-keeping. One day Umakant meets an accident and becomes handicap. Instead of supporting the parents, Deepak and Amar desert them and live separately. In the meantime Durga comes to rescue of Umakant and tries to find a job for herself to support her family. Durga has dress designing skills. With supports from Atal Bihari (Mihir Das), she finds a job of dress designer in a company. By her outstanding skills, she excelled in her profession and good fortune. The time passes away, Deepak and Amar face lot of trouble in their life and become bankrupt. They seek help from their parents, Durga refuse to help them any way. But Umakant convinces durga to support and forgive their children and at last the family united.

== Cast ==
- Bijay Mohanty as Umakant Rautrai
- Mahasweta Roy as Durga Rautrai
- Mihir Das as Atal Bihari
- Siddhanta Mahapatra as Deepak Rautrai
- Usasi Misra as Seema Rautrai
- Jyoti Misra as Manisha
- Sarat Pujari as Industrialist
- Jairam Samal as Trinath Tandi
- Snigdha Mohanty as Atal's wife
- Akshaya Bastia as Amar Rautrai
- George Tiadi as Anadi
- Indu Patra
- Dhira Basa

== Awards ==
Award	Category	Recipient(s) and nominee(s)	Result	Ref.
Orissa State Film Awards 1998	Best Film	Sabyasachi Mohapatra	Won	
Orissa State Film Awards 1998	Best Director	Sabyasachi Mohapatra	Won	
Orissa State Film Awards 1998	Best Actor	Bijay Mohanty	Won	
Orissa State Film Awards 1998	Best Actress	Mahasweta Roy	Won	
Orissa State Film Awards 1998	Best Supporting Actor	Siddhant Mohapatra	Won	
Orissa State Film Awards 1998	Best Screenplay	Sabyasachi Mohapatra	Won	
