= List of Odia films of 2015 =

A list of films produced by the Ollywood film industry and released in theaters in 2015.

== List of released films ==
Title	Director	Cast	Genre	Release Date	Notes	Source
2015
Bhaunri - The Sinking Reality	Sudhanshu Mohan Sahoo	Arindam Roy, Bidita, Mihir Das, Manoj Mishra		1 Jan 2015		
Capital I	Amartya Bhattacharyya	Pallavi Priyadarshini, Susant Mishra	Drama			
Jiye Jaha Kahu Mora Dho	Mrutyunjaya Sahoo	Babushaan Mohanty, Sheetal Patra, Minaketan Das	Drama, Comedy & Romance	1 January 2015		
Ishq Tu Hi Tu	Tapas Sargharia	Arindam, Elina, Mihir Das, Minaketan, Priyanka, Samaresh Routray, Pragyan	Romance	14 Jan 2015	Elina's 1st Movie "Kie Haba Mo Herione Fame"	
College Time	Sudhansu Mohan Sahu	Amlan, Riya	Romance	23 Jan 2015		
Nua Nua Premare	S. K. Muralidharan	Amlan, Patrali, Mihir Das, Minaketan, Pragyan	Romance	14 Feb 2015		
Lekhichi na tora		Sambit Acharya, Pinky Priyadarshini	Drama	8 May 2015		
Bhala Pae Tate 100 Ru 100	Sudhanshu Mohan sahu	Babushaan Mohanty, Sheetal Patra, Suryamayee Mohapatra	Drama, Comedy And Romance	18 October 2015		
Jaga Hatare Pagha	K. Murlai Krishna	Anubhav Mohanty, Jhilik Bhattacharjee, Mahasweta Ray, Buddhaditya Mohanty		18 October 2015		
Super Michhua	Ashok Pati	Babushaan Mohanty, Jhilik Bhattacharjee, Aparajita Mohanty, Minaketan Das	Drama, Comedy And Romance	12 june 2015		
Gapa Hele bi Sata	k. Murali Krishna	Anubhav Mohanty, Varsha Priyadarshini, Mihir Das, Salil Mitra	Romance	14 June 2015		
Pilata Bigidi Gala	Basant Sahu	Sabyasachi, Archita, Papu Pom Pom, Lipsa	Comedy, Romance	14 Aug 2015		
Raghupati Raghav Rajaram	Sudhansu Mohan Sahoo	Sidhant Mohapatra, Riya Dey, Debasis, Pupinder	Drama	28 Aug 2015	Debut movie of Debasmita, Tapaswi and Monisha from "Mun Bi Heroine Hebi" Season 1 fame Associate Director : Tripati Kumar Sahu	
Kehi Nuhen Kahara	Sushant Mani	Bijay Mohanty, Siddhant, Elina Samantrai	Thriller	2015		
Antarleena	Manas Sahoo	Bijay Mohanty, Lipsa Misra, Soumya Ranjan, Bhawani Prasad, Dharitry Khandual	Drama	31 Dec 2015		
