= List of Odia films of 2017 =

A list of films produced by the Ollywood film industry and released in theaters in 2017.

Film	Actor(s)	Director	Music Director	Release	Note	Source
Sister Sridevi	Babushaan Mohanty, Sivani Sangita,Aparajita Mohanty, Mihir Das	Ashok Pati	Abhijit Majumdar	9 June 2017		
Abhaya	Anubhav Mohanty, Elina Samantray	Murali Krishna	Prem Anand	11 June 2017		
God Father	Siddhanta Mahapatra, Anu Choudhury	Ramesh Rout				
Dil Diwana Heigala	Babushaan Mohanty, Sheetal Patra, Aparajita Mohanty, Mihir Das, Bijay Mohanty	Sudhanshu Sahu	A.S Kumar	13 January 2017		
Hero No. 1	Babushaan Mohanty, Bhoomika Dash, Mihir Das	Tapas Sargharia	Abhijit Majumdar	24 September 2017		
Kabula Barabula	Anubhav Mohanty, Elina Samantray	Ramesh Rout	Prem Anand	27 September 2017		
Nijhum Ratira Sathi	Jyoti Ranjan, Tamanna	Sanjay Nayak	Malay Mishra	1 January 2017		
Suna Pila Tike Screw Dhila	Babushaan Mohanty, Sheetal Patra, Papu Pom Pom, Pintu Nanda, Pragyan, Aparajita Mohanty, Uttam Mohanty	Sudhakar Vasanth	Abhijit Majumdar	4 August 2017		
Mu Khanti Odia Jhia	Elina Samantray, Sidhant Mahapatra	Avtar Singh bhurji	Baidyanath Dash	8 September 2017		
Laila O Laila	Swaraj Barik, Sunmeera	Sushant Mani	Baidyanath Dash	29 December 2017		
Romeo Juliet	Arindam Roy, Barsha Priyadarshini	Sudhakar Vasanth				
Tu Mo Love Story	Swaraj Barik, Bhumika Das	Tapas Sargharia	Prem Anand	7 April 2017		
Sita Rama Nka Bahaghara Kalijugare	Sabyasachi Mishra, Bijay Mohanty	G.N.S. Prasad	Kishan Kavadiya	31 March 2017		
Tu Mo Hero	Jyoti Ranjan Nayak, Jhilik Bhattacharya	S. Dilip Panda	Baidyanath Dash	20 October 2017		
To Premare Padila Pare	Debraj, Chinmayee	Saroj Kant	Biswaswarup Mohapatra	24 November 2017		
Tulasi Apa	Barsha Nayak, Madhusmita, Sujit Paikrey	Amiya Patnaik		19 May 2017		
