= List of Odia films of 2018 =

A list of films produced by the Ollywood film industry and released in theaters in 2018.

Title	Director(s)	Cast	Genre	Release Date	Notes	Award(s)
4 Idiots	Basanta Sahoo	Sabyasachi Mishra, Akash Dasnayak, Kuna Tripathy, Chittaranjan Tripathy				
Only Pyaar	Tapas Sargharia	Babushaan Mohanty, Supriya Nayak, Mihir Das, Aparajita Mohanty		12th January 2018		
Happy Lucky	Sudhansu Sahu	Jyoti Ranjan Nayak, Sambeet Acharya, Elina Samantray, Sasmita, Bobby Mishra	Action & Romance		Remake of Telugu movie Tadakha	
Love Express	Ramesh Rout	Swaraj Barik, Sunmeera				
Sundergarh Ra Salman Khan	Ashok Pati	Babushaan Mohanty , Mihir Das, Divyadisha Mohanty, Puspa Panda, Udit Guru, Tribhuban Panda, Aiswarya Behera, Kanhu Mohanty, Rabi Kumar, Bobby Mishra, Usasi Misra, Krishna Kar	Romantic Comedy	13th June 2018	Remake of Telugu movie Denikaina Ready which itself was a remake of Malayalam movie Udayapuram Sulthan	
Ishq Puni Thare	Jyoti Das	Arindam Roy, Elina Samantray, Harihar Mohapatra, Soumya Narayan Panda, Kanhu Mohanty, Tribhuban Panda, Lipika Senapati, Puspa Panda, Aiswarya Behera, Ajit Das, Gyana, Rabi Mishra	Action & romance			
Local Toka Love Chokha	Sudhanshu Sahu	Babushaan Mohanty, Sunmeera, Mihir Das, Aparajita Mohanty , Pradymna Lenka		10th August 2018		
Prem Kumar	Tapas Sargharia	Anubhav Mohanty, Sivani Sangeeta & Tamanna Vyas	Romance & Action			
Sriman Surdas	Ashok Pati	Babushaan Mohanty, Bhoomika Dash, Buddhaditya Mohanty, Mihir Das, Bobby Mishra	Romance, comedy & Drama	16th October 2018	Remake of Andhhagadu	
