= Tarang Cine Productions =

Indian film company

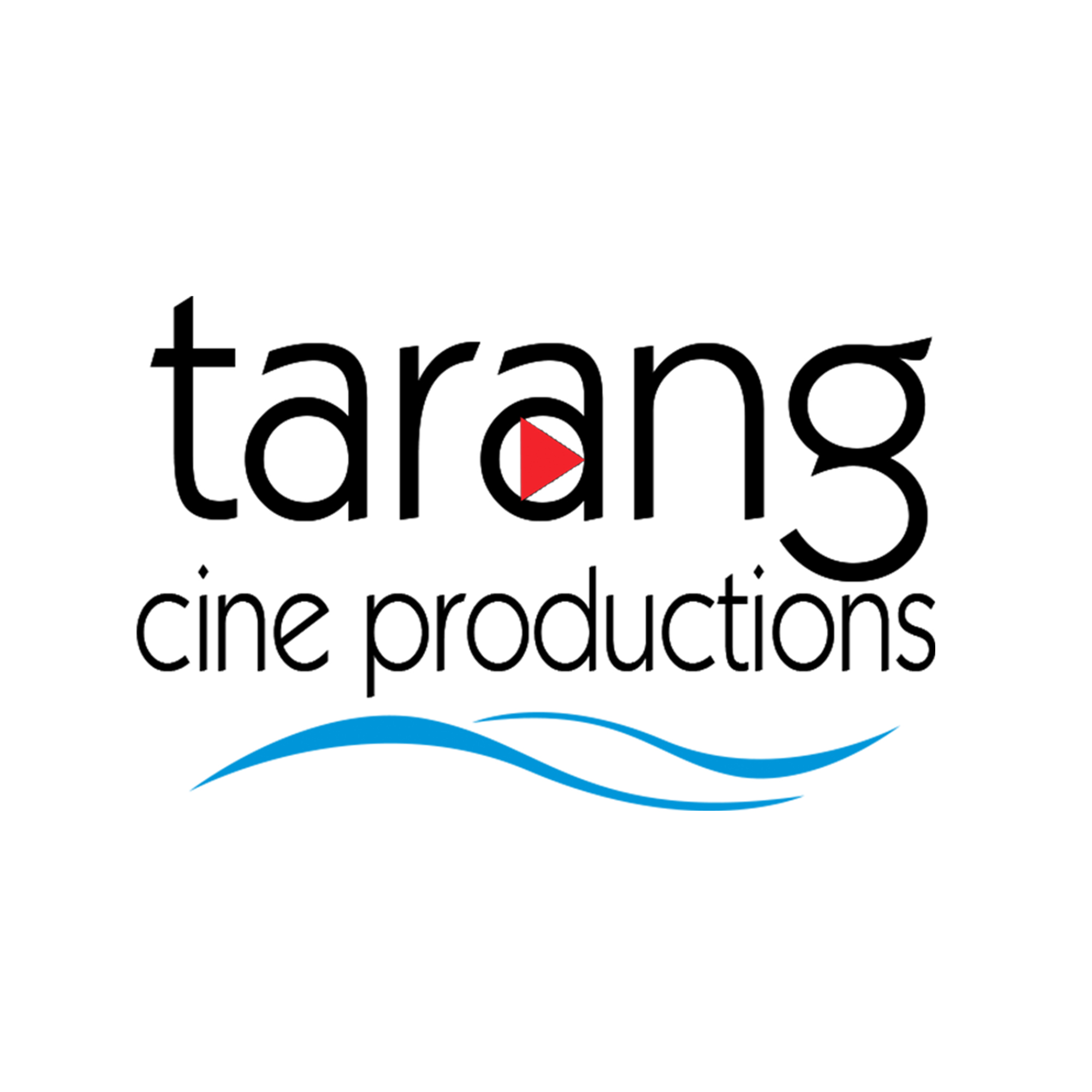
- Type: Private company
- Industry: Entertainment
- Founded: Bhubaneswar, Odisha, India
- Founder: Jagi Mangat Panda
- Headquarters: Bhubaneswar, Odisha, India
- Key people: Jagi Mangat Panda
- Products: Film production, film distribution, television advertisement
- Parent: Odisha Television Network

Tarang Cine Productions is an Indian motion picture production and distribution company based in Bhubaneswar, Odisha, as a part of the Odia film industry. The company was founded by Odisha Television Network in 2015. Others sections of Odisha Television Network are OTV, Odisha Reporter, Tarang, Alankar, Tarang Music, Prarthana Life. and TarangPlus.

== History ==
Ishq Tu Hi Tu, Tarang Cine Productions first venture was released in January 2015 with powerstar Arindam Roy.

== Film production ==
Year	Title	Director(s)	Cast	Genre	Notes
2015	Ishq Tu Hi Tu	Tapas Sargharia	Arindam Roy, Elina Samantray	Romance	
2015	Gapa Hele bi Sata	Murali Krishna	Anubhav Mohanty, Barsha Priyadarshini	Romance	Remake of Kannada movie Charminar
2015	Jaga Hatare Pagha	Murali Krishna	Anubhav Mohanty, Elina Samantray, Jhilik Bhattacharjee	Romance	Remake of Marathi movie Lai Bhaari
2016	Tu Kahibu Na Mu	Sushanta Mani	Amlan Das, Niharika Dash	Romantic Comedy	
2016	Love Station	Ashok Pati	Babushaan Mohanty, Elina Samantray, Mihir Das	Romance	Remake of Telugu movie Venkatadri Express
2016	Love Pain Kuch Bhi Karega	Ashok Pati	Babushaan Mohanty , Supriya Nayak, Mihir Das	Romance	
2017	Tu Mo Love Story	Tapas Sargharia	Swaraj Barik, Bhumika Das, Mihir Das	Romance	
2017	Sister Sridevi	Ashok Pati	Babushaan Mohanty, Shivani, Aparajita Mohanty, Mihir Das	Romantic Comedy	Remake of Tamil movie Remo
2017	Abhaya	Murali Krishna	Anubhav Mohanty, Elina Samantray, Manoj Mishra	Thriller	Remake of Tamil movie Ivan Veramathiri and its Kannada version Chakravyuha
2018	Hero No. 1	Tapas Sargharia	Babushaan Mohanty, Bhumika Das, Mihir Das	Romance	Remake of Pakistani movie Actor in Law
2018	Happy Lucky	Sudhansu Sahu	Jyoti, Sambit, Elina, Sasmita	Action & Romance	Remake of Tamil movie Vettai
2018	Sundergarh Ra Salman Khan	Ashok Pati	Babushaan Mohanty , Divya, Mihir Das	Romantic Comedy	Remake of Telugu movie Denikaina Ready which itself was a remake of Malayalam movie Udayapuram Sulthan
2018	Ishq Puni Thare	Jyoti Das	Arindam Roy & Elina Samantray	Action & romance	
2018	Prem Kumar: Salesman of the year	Tapas Sargharia	Anubhav Mohanty, Tamanna Vyas, Shivani	Romance & Action	Remake of Punjabi movie Ambarsariya
2018	Sriman Surdas	Ashok Pati	Babushaan Mohanty,Bhoomika Dash, Mihir Das, Buddhaditya Mohanty, Aparajita Mohanty	Romance, Comedy & Drama	Remake of Telugu movie Andhhagadu
2019	Chal Tike Dusta Heba	Tapas Sargharia	Mahima, Sayal, Rishan	Romance	
2019	Tu mo love story 2	Tapas Sargharia	Swaraj, Siddhanta Mahapatra, Bhumika Dash, Anu Choudhury		
2019	Golmaal Love	Ashok Pati	Babushaan Mohanty , Tamanna Vyas, Bijay Mohanty, Sritam Das	Romance, Comedy & Drama	Remake of Telugu movie Achari America Yatra
2019	Khusi	Tapas Sargharia	Saroj Parida, Kavya Kiran and Mihir Das	Drama	Based on Korean movie Hope
2019	Mr. Majnu	Ashok Pati	Babushaan Mohanty , Divya Mohanty, Surmayee & Shital Patra, Mihir Das	Romantic Comedy	Partially inspired by the Tamil movie Theeradha Vilaiyattu Pillai
2022	Hi Krushna	Happy Chandan	Sailendra Samantaray, Jasmine Rath	Comedy Drama	
2023	Pushkara	Subhransu Das	Sabyasachi Mishra, Supriya Nayak, Pintu Nanda, Ashrumochan Mohanty	Drama	Based on Odia novel Nadabindu by Shankar Tripathy
2025	Pade Akasha	Sushant Mani	Archita Sahu, Smita Mohanty, Rajesh Jais, Hara Rath	Biopic	Based on the life of Dr. Sruti Mohapatra, a disability rights advocate
