= List of Odia films of 2016 =

A list of films produced by the Ollywood film industry and released in theaters in 2016.

Title	Director	Cast	Genre	Release date	Producer / Production House	Notes
Agastya	K. Murali Krishna	Anubhav Mohanty, Jhilik Bhattacharya, Akash Dasnayak, Mihir Das	Action, Thriller	2016	Akshay Kumar Parija	Remake of Kannad film Ugramm starring Srimurali and Haripriya 2014
Baby	K. M. Krishan	Anubhav Mohanty, Preeti Priyadarshini				
Bye Bye Dubai	Basanta Sahoo	Sabyasachi Mishra, Archita Sahu	Comedy, Drama			
Chini	Pradeep Bhol	Amlan Das, Patrali	Drama			
Chup Chup Chori Chori	Sudhansu Sahu	Abhishek Rath, Ria Dey	Romance	2016	Sarthak Music Pvt. Ltd.	
Gote Sua Gote Sari	Mrutyunjaya Sahoo	Anubhav Mohanty, Barsa Priyadarshini	Romance	2016	Niranjan Rana	
Hela Mate Prema Jara	Amaresh Pati	Sabyasachi Mishra, Archita Sahu Rusi Pattanaik	Romance	2016	Smruti Rnan Rout, Suresh Kumar Haibru	Remake of Telugu film Bhale Bhale Magadivoy starring Nani and Lavanya
Hey Prabhu Dekha De	Gopi Anand	Harihar Das, Anu Choudhury, Amandeep, Pragyan Khatua, Pappu Pampam, Mihir Das, Dusmant Sahu, Salil Mitra	Romance, Comedy, Thriller	2016	Studio Gopix, HYDERABAD	The official remake of Tollywood's (Telugu) blockbuster movie Swamy Ra Ra (2013)
Jabardast Premika	Raju Sarabaiah	Babushaan Mohanty, Jhilik Bhattacharya, Mihir Das, Aparajita Mohanty	Romance, Comedy	13th April 2016	C. Arunpandian, Kavitha Pandian	
Jhiata Bigidi Gala	Bini Patnaik	Babushaan Mohanty, Elina Samantaray	Romance, Drama	14th July 2016	Sachikant Jena	
Jouthi Tu Seithi Mu	Sushant Kumar Rout	Saroj Das, Sritam Das, Anara Gupta	Romance	2016	Anupama Rout	
Krantidhara	Himanshu Khatua	Samaresh Routray, Gargi Mahanty, Debasis Patra	Drama			
Love Pain Kuch Bhi Karega	Ashok Pati	Babushaan Mohanty Supriya Nayak,Mihir Das	Drama	7th October 2016		
Love Station	Ashok Pati	Babushaan Mohanty, Elina Samantray, Mihir Das, Papu Pom Pom	Drama, Comedy & Romance	12th June 2016	Tarang Cine Productions	Remake of Telugu film Venkatadri express starring suldeep and rakul prirtisingh 2013
Premare Premare	Sudhansu Mohan Sahu	Arindam, Sheetal Patra	Romance, Comedy	2016	Sarthak Music Pvt. Ltd.	
Samaya Bada Balaban	S. K. Muralidharan	Pupinder, Ansuman, Anubha Sourya, Lipsa Misra	Romance, Comedy	2016	Pupinder	
Sweet Heart	Susant Mani	Babushaan Mohanty, Anubha Sourya Sapangi, Anu Choudhury, Aparajita Mohanty, Mihir Das, Bijay Mohanty	Thriller	18th August 2016		
Tu Je Sei	Ashok Pati	Babushaan Mohanty, Mihir Das, Riya Dey, Aparajita Mohanty	Action, Romance, Comedy	1st January 2016	Sarthak Music Pvt. Ltd.	
Tora Dine Ku Mora Dine	Sudhanshu Mohan Sahu	Arindam Roy, Amlan Das, Riya Dey				
Tu Kahibu Na Mu	Susant Mani	Amlan Das, Niharika Das, Mihir Das, illu Banarjee	Romance, Drama	2016	Tarang Cine Productions	
