= List of Odia films of 2011 =

This is a list of films produced by the Ollywood film industry based in Bhubaneshwar and Cuttack in 2011:

== A-Z ==
Title	Director	Cast	Genre	Release date	Notes
2011
143 I Love You	Ashok Pati	Babushaan Mohanty, Siddhant Mahapatra, Namrata Thapa, Koel Banarjee, Mihir Das, Samresh Routaray, Minaketan, Harihara, Pintu Nanda	Action, Drama, Romance	14 June 2011	
Ae Mana Khoje Mana Tiye	Ranjan Misra	Ajit Das, Anita Das, Mihir Das, Sunil Kumar, Tanmay Misra, Priya, Roopali		18 March 2011	
Anjali	Biswa Bhusan Mohapatra	Aditya, Sampurna Chakraborty, Deabasmitha, Raj		20 May 2011	
Baisi Pahache Kheliba Mina ... Pralaya asuchi	Sanjay Nayak	Lalit, Poonam Mishra, Bijay Mohanty, Mihir Das, Priya Choudhary, Bina Moharana		14 June 2011	
Balunga Toka	Sudhakar Basanta	Anubhav Mohanty,Varsha Priyadarshini	Action		Remake of Tamil movie 7G Rainbow Colony
Chandini I Miss U	Basant Sahu	Sabyasachi Mishra, Priya, Megha Ghosh, Debasish	Drama, Romance	2 October 2011	Anam Charan Sahoo & Bhabani Charan Rath
Chatire Lekhichi Tori Naa	Sanjay Nayak	Sabyasachi Mishra, Barsa Priyadarshini, Bijoy Mohanty	Action, musical	14 January 2011	
Chocolate	Sushant Mani	Babushaan Mohanty, Archita Sahu, Mihir Das, Aparajita Mohanty	Romance	7 August 2011	Inspired by the English movie A Walk to Remember
Chori Chori Mana Chori	Rajib Mohanty	Debasish Patra, Nikita, Meena Ketan, Pintu Nanda, Puspa Panda, Snigdha	Action, Drama, Romance	29 July 2011	Remake of Hindi film Baaghi: A Rebel for Love
Criminal	Dilip Panda	Mihir Das	Action, crime		Producer Ajay Mulia
Dosti	Ashok Pati	Babushaan Mohanty, Sabyasachi Mishra, Pintu Nanda, Priya Choudhury, Megha Ghosh	Action, drama, romance	30 September 2011	Remake of Telgu movie Snehamante Idera
Family No.1	Nishikant Dalabehera	Biju Badajena, Bikash Das, Deepak	Drama, family, romance	27 May 2011	
Katak-The silver city	Subrat Behera	Sidhant Mohapatra, Mihir Das, Koel Mallick	Action, romance	6 Nov 2011	Producer Manash Singh, music Prem Anand
Kemiti Ae Bandhana	Saroj Satapathy	Chandrachud Singh, Anu Choudhury, Sabyasachi Mishra, Mahasweta, Bijay Mohanty, Arpita	Drama	August 2011	Pradip Kumar Sahu (Lipu)
Kiese Dakuchi Kouthi Mate	Sudhakar Basanta	Anubhav Mohanty, Varsha Priyadarshini	Romance	14 June 2011	
Loafer	Ashok Pati	Babushaan Mohanty, Archita Sahu, Mihir Das, Aparajita Mohanty	Drama, Comedy, Action	14 January 2011	Remake of Telugu movie Happy (2006)
Mana Mora Prajapati	Anama Charana Sahoo	Chinmay, Mihir Das, Deepak	Drama, musical, romance	25 February 2011	
Mate Bohu Kari Nei Ja	Bikash Das	Sidhant Mohapatra, Dipen, Aishwarya Pathi	Action, Crime	3 April 2011	
Most Wanted	Sushant Mani	Anubhav Mohanty, Megha Ghosh, Mihir Das	Action	14 January 2011	
Mu Premi Mu Pagala	Sudhanshu Mohan Sahoo	Harihara, Anubha, Mihir Das, Usasi, Bijay Mohanthy, Puspa Panda	Romance	August 2011	Remake of Kotha Bangaru Lokam
Prem weds Priya	Ramashankar	Sambit Acharya, Chakradhar Jena, Pradyumna Lenka	Drama, musical, romance	6 May 2011	
Tora mora katha heba chup chap	Rudra Narayan Mohanty	Akshaya Bastia, Debu Bose, Neha Bose	Action, drama, music	6 May 2011	
Tu Mo Girlfriend	Avtar Singh	Arindam Roy,Mihir Das, Uttam Mohanty	Drama, musical, romance	11 March 2011	Remake of Telugu movie Dhee
