= List of Odia films of 2025 =

This is a list of Odia films produced in Ollywood in India that are scheduled to be released in 2025.

Background shading indicates that a film is currently showing in theatres worldwide.

== Films ==
Opening		Title	Director	Cast	Studio	Ref
J A N U A R Y	3	Wife	Sudhakar Vasanth	Varsha Priyadarshini, Jayjeet Das, Shankarsan Pradhan, Saraswati, Bijayinee Mishra	Vidisha Kraft	
J A N U A R Y	10	Baida	Mayur Mahapatra, Siddhant Swaroop	Shubhangi Harichandan, Saisresth Das, Rajesh Kumar Mohanty, Shivani Khara, Sidharth Ray	MNM Entertainment	
J A N U A R Y	12	Rangashoor	Pratap Rout	Suryamayee Mohapatra, Jyoti Ranjan Nayak, Dipanwit Dashmohapatra, Subhasis Sharmaa, Choudhury Jayaprakash Das	Moon TV Movies, Prakash Films, Maxminia Films	
J A N U A R Y	17	Adrushya	Satya Narayan Sahoo	Abhishek Giri, Lipsa Mishra, Sayal Mukherjee, Choudhury Jayaprakash Das, Jeeban Panda, Anant Mishra	Maa Gayatri Fims	
J A N U A R Y	24	Bhai – The Opening Part	Prithvi Raj Pattanaik	Amlan Das, Divyadisha Mohanty, Sujeet Paikaray, Ananya Mishra, Vikash Ganatra, Dibyajyoti Udayasingh	Amara Studios, Widnine Entertainment	
J A N U A R Y	31	Angel	Jitendriya Pradhan	Partha Sarathi Ray, Kavya Keeran, Prasanjeet Mohapatra, Jitendriya Pradhan, Sai Trishna, Abhishek Mohanty, Sarbeswar Sutar	Subham Cine Productions	
F E B R U A R Y	7	Misiri	Sisir Kumar Sahu, Peenakee Singh	Biswajit Rout (Vivash), Rupashree Panda, Prasanjeet Mohapatra, Shakti Baral, Pushpa Panda	Sai Films, Kaberi Entertainment	
F E B R U A R Y	7	Sanatani – Karma Hi Dharma	Basudeb Barad	Sambeet Acharya, Arlin Ankita, Papi Santuka, Guddu, Jagannath Seth, Prakash Mohanty, MD Bablu, Chiranjeevi Biswal	Vidisha Craft	
F E B R U A R Y	8	Besahara	Niranjan Behera	Jyoti Ranjan Nayak, Supriya Nayak, Pintu Nanda, Pradyumna Lenka, Debu Brahma, Papi Santuka, Prativa Panda, Aiswarya Behera	Acharya Entertainment (Alankar TV Premiere)	
F E B R U A R Y	9	Baji Lagichi Mo Sankha Sindura	Sanjay Nayak	Bikram Keshari Mohanty, Alok Mishra, Sulagna Nayak, Manaswini Pati, Kedar Mishra, Rajashree, Kunal Pattnaik, Bijet Barik	Tarang TV and Tarang Plus OTT Premiere	
F E B R U A R Y	14	Valentine – The Memorable Day	Manas Sahoo	Sambit Kumar, Barsha, Avi, Mamali, Biren Mishra, Mita Chakrabarti	Chandrabati Vision	
M A R C H	2	Mo Mummy Papanka Bahaghara 2	Amaresh Pati	Sweety Patnaik, Hiranmayee Das, Srijit Mahapatra, Sukant Rath, Subharansu Nayak, Prabhati, Debu Bramha	Tarang TV and Tarang Plus OTT Premiere	
M A R C H	13	Ghamaghot	Raja Dash	Sailendra Samantray, Krishna Kar, Deepak Parida, Sanoj Kumar, Vivash Rout, Abhishek Panda, Tapi Mishra, Akash Hota, Jayshree Sarangi	Kaustav Dreamwork Studios	
M A R C H	14	Simili	Sukumar Mani	Lipika Senapati, Suryamayee Mohapatra, Manoj Rout, Anup Saha, Suman Maharana, Dusmanta Sahoo	MKR Production	
M A R C H	30	Ajab Ae Prem Kahani	Rasesh Mohanty	Srijit Mahapatra, Bhakti Patnaik	SPP Productions, Zee Sarthak Films (TV Premiere)	
A P R I L	11	Ajira Rebati	Subhransu Das	Sheetal Patra, Bonny Sengupta, Pushpa Panda, Pruthviraj Nayak, Usashi Mishra, Sukant Rath	R R Events & Cine Production	
A P R I L	11	Dustbin	Papu Pom Pom	Papu Pom Pom, Prachee, Jeeban Panda, Jayaprakash Das, Dipanwit Dashmohapatra, Smita Mohanty, Aravind Sadhangi, Sukumar Tudu	PK Films	
A P R I L	11	Pade Akasha	Sushant Mani	Archita Sahu, Smita Mohanty, Rajesh Jais, Hara Rath	Tarang Cine Productions	
A P R I L	25	1999 – Eka Sangupta Kahani	Amir Pati	Dr. Manoj Mishra, Manorama Mishra, SK Apurba, Kali Charan Acharya	Guptaganga Creations	
A P R I L	25	Racket	Sangram Mohanty	Namrata Thappa, Hemant Patra, Dushmant Panda, Arlin Ankita, Pruthviraj Nayak, Ankita Dash	Shree Motion Pictures	
A P R I L	27	Sunanaki Bohu	Mrityunjay Sahoo	Nikita Mishra, Saplin Mishra, Pushpa Panda, Prithviraj Nayak	Zee Sarthak Films	
M A Y	30	Bhabantara	Anant Mahapatra	Suryamayee Mohapatra, Abhishek Giri, Saroj Nanda, Anant Mahapatra, Binayak Mishra	Imagination Unlimited	
J U N E	6	1st Love	Abhishek Mitra	Sailendra Samantaray, Divyadisha Mohanty, Choudhury Jayprakash Das, Sanjaya, Xonty, Usasi Mishra	Range Royal Cine Lab, Zee Sarthak Films	
J U N E	8	Jwain Puara Jibana Bima	Rasesh Mohanty	Sandip, Mitali Sargharia, Rabi Mishra, Krishna Kar	Vidisha Kraft (TV Premiere)	
J U N E	12	Bou Buttu Bhuta	Jagdish Mishra	Babushaan Mohanty, Aparajita Mohanty, Archita Sahu, Anugulia Bunty, Choudhury Jayprakash Das, Udit Guru, Robin Das	Babushaan Films	
J U N E	12	Ananta	Kumar C. Dev Mohapatra, Sabyasachi Mohapatra	Sabyasachi Mishra, Suryamayee Mohapatra, Kuna Tripathy, Tapas Sargharia, Jyotirmayee Panda	Amara Studios, Shivaansh Productions, Sabyasachi Films	
J U L Y	4	Shri Jagannath nka Nabakalebara	Soubhagyalaxmi Jena (Bini)	Sidhant Mohapatra, Sritam Das, Pinky Pradhan, Jyoti, Sibani Sangita, Ansuman, Suryamoye, Kuna tripathy	Sai Sradha Tele Production	
A U G U S T	1	Chhi Re Nani	Susant Mani	Sailendra Samantray, Sivani Sangita, Dipanwit Dashmohapatra, Choudhary Jayaprakash Dash, Smita Mohanty	Sidharth Music	
A U G U S T	27	Delivery Boy 2	Aswin Tripathy	Archita Sahu, Sailendra Samantray, Buddhaditya Mohanty, Priyambada Swain, Pupindar Singh, Sritam Das, Santu Nijee, Bhoomika Dash		
S E P T E M B E R	12	Lahari	Amartya Bhattacharya	Choudhury Bikash Das, Choudhury Jayaprakash Das, Smruti Mahala, Dipanwit Dashmohapatra, Susant Mishra, Swastik Choudhury, Babushaan Mohanty, Jhilik Bhattacharjee	Jhilik Motion Pictures	
S E P T E M B E R	25	Charidham – A Journey Within	Tapas Sargharia	Anubhav Mohanty, Anuradha Panigrahi, Sukanta Ratha, Ashok Das, Mamata Tripathy, Sukanta Ratha, Pradyumna Lenka	Camera Queen Production	
S E P T E M B E R	26	Challenge	Sai Kiran Mangaraj	Ardhendu Sahu, Elina Samantaray, Puneet Issar, Lipi Mohapatra, Bobby Mishra, Pupindar Sing Riar, Harihara Mohapatra	Adilaxmi Entertainment, Zee Sarthak	
D E C E M B E R	12	Nanda Master'nka Chatasali	Pranab Kumar Aich	Nanda Prusty, Khageswar Prusty, Saisresth Das, Nityasha Pattnaik, Shivangi Tripathy, Rabindra Rout	Abhismita Films, Studiowaala Films	
D E C E M B E R	31	Ladhei	Ashok Pati	Lohitakshya, Abhilipsa, Preetiranjan, KK, Bibhas, Udit Guru, Somesh, Madhu, Smita Choudhury, Rajalaxmi Dakua, Rajalaxmi Mahapatra	Debashis Pattnaik	

== See also ==
- List of Odia films
- List of Odia films of 2024
