= Abhijit Majumdar =

Indian Odia music composer (1971–2026)

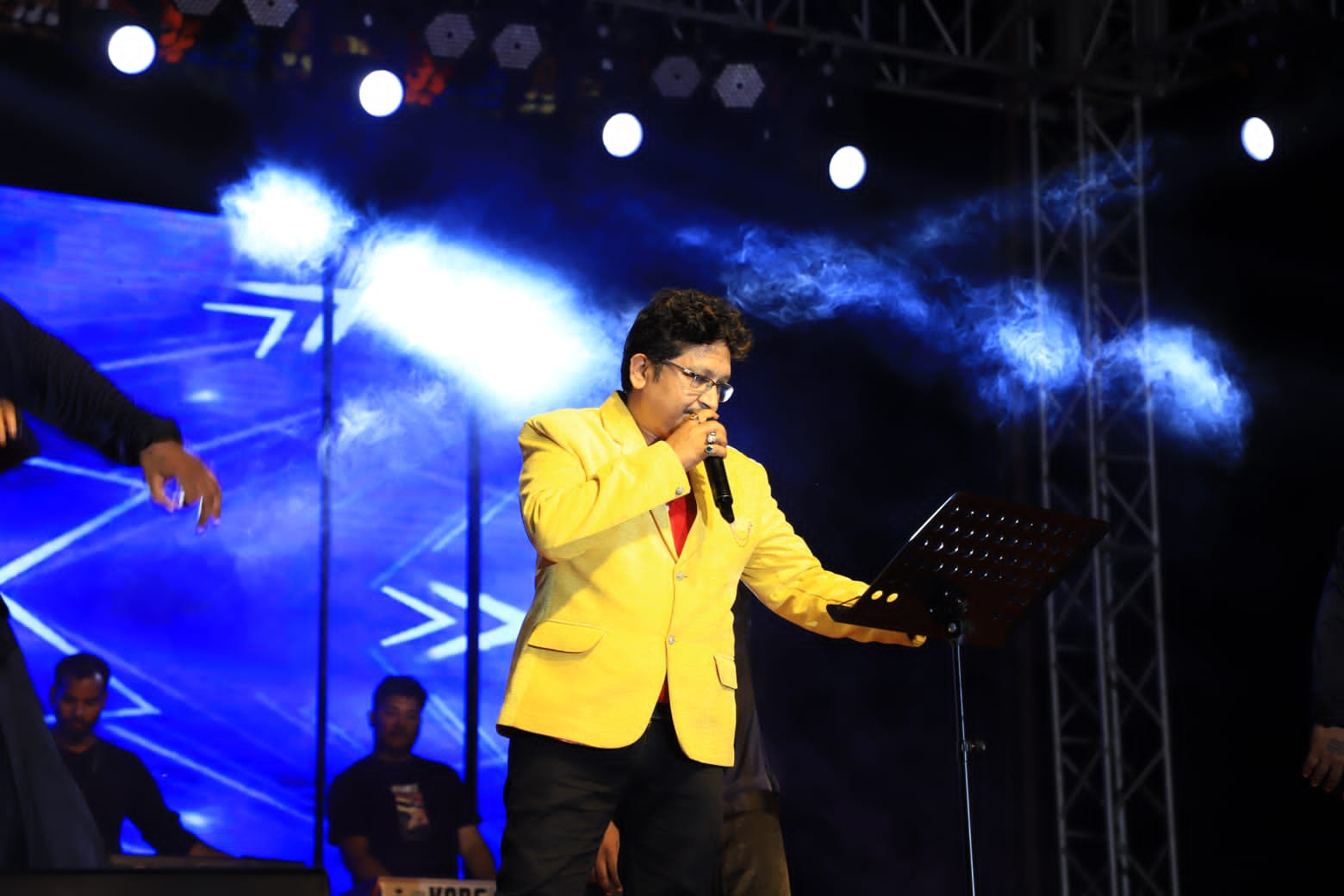
- Born: 11 September 1971; Cuttack, Orissa, India
- Died: 25 January 2026 (aged 54); Bhubaneswar, Odisha, India
- Occupations: Music director; composer
- Years active: 2000–2025
- Known for: Love story, Sister Sridevi, Golmaal Love, Mr. Majnu, Sundergarh Ra Salman Khan, Sriman Surdas
- Spouse: Ranjita Majumdar

Abhijit Majumdar (11 September 1971 – 25 January 2026) was an Indian film music director and composer in Odia films.

== Life and career ==
Majumdar was born on 11 September 1971. He started his career from Sambalpuri Industry, later he started working on Ollywood. He has composed more than 700 songs for Odia movies, albums and Sambalpuri industry.

Majumdar died from liver disease at All India Institute of Medical Sciences, Bhubaneswar, on 25 January 2026, at the age of 54.

== Filmography ==
- All films are in Odia, unless otherwise noted.

Year	Name	Note(s)
2000	Kasia Kapila	
2004	Rakhiba Jadi Se Maariba Kie	
2007	Mo Suna Pua	
2008	Munna: A Love Story	
2008	To Bina Bhala Lagena	
2010	Subha Vivaha	
2010	Sasura Ghara Zindabad	
2010	Om Namaha Shivaya	
2010	Tu Tha Mun Jauchi Rushi	
2011	Balunga Toka	
2011	Kichhi Khata Kichhi Mitha	
2011	Aain Kanoon	
2012	Matric Fail	
2012	Rangila Toka	
2012	Love Master	
2012	Jaggu Autowala	
2013	Love Hela Emiti	
2013	Chowka Chhaka	
2013	Target	
2013	Salaam Cinema	
2013	Rudra	
2013	Ashok Samrat	
2013	Hari Om Hari	
2013	Daha Balunga	
2013	Tanka Tate Salam	
2013	Kehi Jane Bhala Lagere	
2014	Puni Dekha Heba Ara Janamare	
2014	Smile Please	
2014	Ame Ta Toka Sandha Marka	
2014	Ganja Ladhei	
2015	Jiye Jaha Kahu Mora Dho	
2015	Bhaunri	
2015	Ishq Tu Hi Tu	
2015	Nua Nua Premare	
2015	Kie Daba Takkar	
2015	Aashiq	
2016	Samaya Bada Balaban	
2016	Jabardast Premika	
2016	Love Station	
2016	Love Pain Kuchh Bhi Karega	
2016	God Father (2016 film)	
2017	Hero No 1	
2017	Sister Sridevi	
2017	Kabula Barabula	
2017	Suna Pila Tike Screw Dhila	
2018	Sundergarh Ra Salman Khan	
2018	Only Pyaar	
2018	Deewana Heli To Pai	
2018	Shakti	
2018	Sriman Surdas	
2019	Golmaal Love	
2019	Baishali	
2019	Chal Tike Dusta Heba	
2019	Mr. Majnu	
2019	Golmaal Love	
2019	Jor Ka Jhatka	
2020	Jay Hanuman	
TBA	Poglu	
