= Vishal Mourya and Debi Prasad Lenka =

Indian film director and screenwriter

- Born: Vishal Mourya: Gwalior, Madhya Pradesh, India; Debi Prasad Lenka: Cuttack, Odisha, India
- Occupations: Film director, producer, screenwriter
- Years active: 2010–present
- Notable work: DAMaN (2022)

Vishal Mourya and Debi Prasad Lenka is an Indian film director, producer, and screenwriter, best known for co-directing the Odia film DAMaN (2022), which won the Best Odia Film at the 70th National Film Awards. He works primarily in Odia cinema.

== Early life ==
Vishal Mourya was born in Gwalior, Madhya Pradesh. He graduated with a degree in information technology from SATI, Vidisha. After completing his studies, he worked with multinational companies in Pune before transitioning into the entertainment industry. He was associated with television networks including Star Plus, Sony TV, and Zoom TV, and worked in events such as Miss India and Miss Universe. His early professional career involved production and creative roles in television and live events, which later influenced his transition into filmmaking.

Debi Prasad Lenka is from Cuttack, Odisha. He completed a three-year filmmaking course and started his career as an assistant director and film editor, working with media and entertainment companies including UTV, Times of India Group, Zee Entertainment, and BAG Films across Odisha and Mumbai.

== Career ==
Mourya began his career in television with Mahayatra and Dance Premier League. Later, he collaborated with Debi Prasad Lenka with whom he later formed a director-duo. They both directed the unreleased Hindi film B-for Bundelkhand. Together, they worked on several projects, including the Odia political drama Biju Babu (2019).

In 2022, Mourya and Lenka co-directed and co-wrote DAMaN, an Odia-language social drama inspired by true events related to malaria eradication efforts in rural Odisha. The film starred Babushaan Mohanty and Dipanwit Dashmohapatra. Made on a budget of around ₹94 lakh, it grossed approximately ₹7.5 crore at the box office. The film was subsequently dubbed in Hindi the following year.

The film received widespread critical acclaim and won the Best Odia Film at the 70th National Film Awards, earning the directors the Rajat Kamal and a cash prize. In an interview, Mourya expressed his hope that the Hindi version of the film would bring national attention to Odisha's cinema.

== Filmography ==
Year	Title	Credited as			Language	Notes
Year	Title	Director	Writer	Editor	Language	Notes
2019	Biju Babu	Yes	Yes	No	Odia	
2022	DAMaN	Yes	Yes	Debi Prasad Lenka	Odia	

== Awards and honours ==
- Best Odia Film – 70th National Film Awards (for DAMaN).
- Rajat Kamal and cash prize from the Directorate of Film Festivals for DAMaN.
