= Daman (2022 film) =

2022 Indian Odia-language film

DAMaN
- Theatrical release Poster
- Directed by: Vishal Mourya; Debi Prasad Lenka
- Written by: Vishal Mourya; Debi Prasad Lenka
- Produced by: Deependra Samal
- Starring: Babushaan; Dipanwit Dashmohapatra
- Cinematography: Pratap Rout
- Edited by: Debi Prasad Lenka
- Music by: Gaurav Anand
- Production companies: JP Motion Pictures; Mentis films; Amara Muzik Odia (Digital & Satellite Partner)
- Distributed by: JP Motion Pictures (Odia); Panorama Studios (Hindi)
- Release date: November 4, 2022
- Running time: 121 minutes
- Country: India
- Language: Odia
- Budget: ₹ 94 lakh

DAMaN, abbreviation for Durgama Anchalare Malaria Nirakarana (transl. Malaria Eradication in Inaccessible Areas), is a 2022 Indian Odia-language adventure drama film written and directed by Vishal Mourya and Debi Prasad Lenka and produced by Deependra Samal. Released in Odia as well as a dubbed version in the Hindi, the film stars Babushaan Mohanty and Dipanwit Dashmohapatra in lead roles.

At the 70th National Film Awards, it won in the category Best Odia Film. This award comprises a Rajat Kamal and cash prize of Rs 2 lakh. The film theatrically released on 4 November 2022 in to highly positive reviews from critics, and became a success in box office.

The film portrays a doctor's relentless fight against superstitions and struggle to make tribal people aware of facts about Malaria disease. The film has been considered inspirational for fresh graduate doctors.

The Hindi dubbed version was released on 3 February 2023.

== Plot ==
The film is set in 2015. Siddharth, a young doctor who completed his MBBS from Bhubaneswar, has been posted to Janbai PHC, a cut-off tribal area in the Malkangiri district of Odisha.

As per the guidelines of Government of Odisha, medical students studying in Government sponsored medical courses have to serve in tribal or rural areas of Odisha for 5 years otherwise they have to pay 5 crore bond price. So, Siddharth has to go there without his wishes. Janbai PHC having 151 villages under it and infamous for Naxals dominance with no basic facilities. Siddharth arrives there with much difficulties and meets Ravindra (Pharmacist). It was very difficult for him to cope with the new place. He tried to escape from the village by resigning.

While leaving from there, a villager brought his daughter for treatment thinking it's a Duma (ghost) but, as per diagnosis it was found out to be Malaria. His associates informed him there are about 151 villages under the PHC all around in remote hilly terrains where people aren't interested to come to hospital as they treat their diseases by exorcism. Siddharth decides to spread awareness in the villages. By the help of some locals he first went to a village and approach them to take free Malaria tests. In the other village he was unable to save a girl from exorcism as she died. Determined to eradicate malaria he himself visits all the villages providing test kits and medication. During his visit to a certain village, the naxalites hijacked the village where Sidhharth and Ravindra carried a pregnant lady for 10 km where he was unsuccessful to take her to Malkangiri hospital due to the unavailability of a boat to cross a river, then decided to take her to his PHC where delivery successfully done. Soon he realised villagers need mosquito nets. He met the CDMO to approach DM to provide funds. Somehow he is successful in his mission.

After six months it was shown that villagers are using the mosquito nets but for different purposes. Hence Malaria returned again which took so many lives where Sidhharth feels helpless. Siddharth and Ravindra assumed villagers may not using nets as per guidelines. He proposed a large scale awareness campaign named DAMaN in the presence of CDMO and DM with the help from different Government bodies. 3 years later, as per ground reports malaria was brought down from 40% to 4%. Siddharth bids adieu to the villagers as they emotionally say good bye to him. Siddharth leaves Janbai for his further studies.

== Cast ==
- Babushaan Mohanty as Dr. Siddharth Mohanty
- Dipanwit Dashmohapatra as Rabindra Muduli (Pharmacist)

== Background ==
DAMaN is an acronym for Durgama Anchalare Malaria Nirakarana (Malaria Control in Inaccessible Areas) (Odia: ଦୁର୍ଗମ ଅଞ୍ଚଳରେ ମ୍ୟାଲେରିଆ ନିରାକରଣ). It was a scheme launched by the state Government of Odisha, which focused on addressing malaria control in inaccessible tribal areas of Odisha. It was implemented in all 8,000 villages of all 79 blocks of eight highly malaria-endemic southern Odisha districts named Koraput, Malkangiri, Nabarangpur, Kalahandi, Rayagada, Gajapati, Nuapada and Kandhamal.

DAMaN is currently being evaluated with epidemiologic studies.

== Soundtrack ==
DAMaN

Soundtrack album by Gaurav Anand
- Released: 12 November 2022
- Genre: Feature film soundtrack
- Length: 18:10
- Language: Odia
- Label: Amara Muzik

Official audio
- DAMaN - Full Album on YouTube

The music was composed by Gaurav Anand.

Odia Track-List:

#	Title	Singer(s)	Lyrics
1	Nichhatiya Mana	Babushaan Mohanty	J. P. Wordsmith
2	Dhemsa	Anurag Das (Lulu), Gaurav Anand	J. P. Wordsmith
3	DAMaN Title Song	Rituraj Mohanty	J. P. Wordsmith
4	Ekla Chala Re	Gaurav Anand	Bapu Goswami

Hindi Track-List:

#	Title	Singer(s)	Lyrics
1	Koi Hai Kya	Abhay Jodhpurkar	Dibyajeet Sahoo
2	Dhemsa	Divya Kumar	Dibyajeet Sahoo
3	DAMaN Title Song	Divya Kumar	Dibyajeet Sahoo
4	Ekla Chale Re	Javed Ali	Dibyajeet Sahoo

== Reception ==
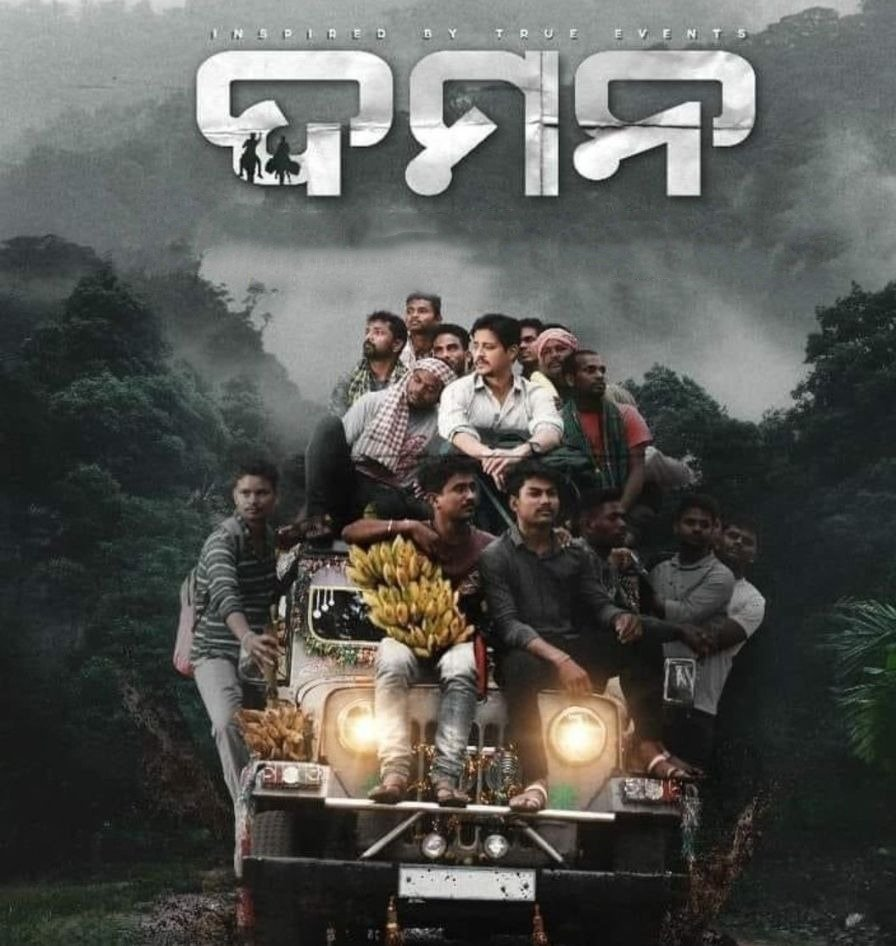
Daman poster in the original Odia language

=== Release and critical reception ===
On 4 November, the film was released in 51 theatres in Odisha and 15 across Bengaluru, Chennai, Mumbai, Delhi, Kolkata, Ahmedabad, Surat, Raipur, Pune and Hyderabad. A critic from Zee Odisha wrote that "Daman is a revitalization for Odia cinema which was in a state of decay. Babushan's film Daman has touched the hearts of the audience". A critic from The Times of India gave the film a rating of four out of five stars and wrote that "This simple and unwavering tale of a doctor's indomitable spirit is a winner all the way". A critic from The Hindu wrote that "Dipanwit Dashmohpatra's honest performance and the integrity of the film's theme manage to keep the audience invested". A critic from The Quint wrote that "While the first half might suffer in pacing, the rest of the film is engaging. DOP Pratap Rout captures the serenity of Odisha all while keeping his gaze firmly fixed on the film's emotional stakes".

The film is the highest grossing Odia film beating God Father-True Story of a Man (2016). Following the support and appreciation both in and out of Odisha, the filmmakers decided to release the movie in Hindi. Bollywood actor Ajay Devgn launched the Hindi dubbed trailer of the film, and the movie was released on 3 February 2023.

=== Government response ===
Odisha government declared DAMaN tax-free in Odisha. Odisha Chief Minister Naveen Patnaik announced that DAMaN, which is based on the malaria eradication programme of the state government, would be exempted from tax. He said "this will encourage the employees of the health department and other government employees posted in the remote areas to excel in selfless service."
