= Idiot: I Do Ishq Only Tumse =

- Directed by: Ashok Pati
- Written by: Ashok Pati
- Starring: Babushaan; Riya Dey; Mihir Das; Debashis Parta; Praygan Khatua; Jairam Samal
- Cinematography: Sitansu Mohapatra
- Edited by: Sukumar Mani
- Music by: Goodli Rath
- Production company: Green India Entertainment
- Release date: 12 June 2012
- Running time: 166 min.
- Country: India
- Language: Odia

Idiot: I Do Ishq Only Tumse is a 2012 Odia film directed by Ashok Pati starring Babushaan and Riya Dey. The film's music director was Goodli Rath.

== Cast ==
- Babushaan as Sanjay
- Riya Dey as Ichha
- Mihir Das as Guru Bhai
- Debashis Parta as Pratik
- Praygan Khatua as Silsila
- Jairam Samal as Chatrubhuj
- Minaketan Das as Gobardhan
- Pritiraj Satpathy as Bishnu
- Soumya Narayan Panda a.k.a. Chancha as Chancha
- Rabi Kumar
- Priyanka Mahapatra as Lakshmi

== Music ==
Track-List
No.	Title	Lyrics	Singer(s)	Length
1.	"Aiela Re Jhuluru Bali"	Bapu Goswami	Bibhu Kishore, Navia
2.	"Beautiful Girl Mote Lut Kalare"	Nizam	Gobinda Chandra
3.	"Dreamy Dreamy"	Dr. Nirmal Nayak	Satyajeet, Tapu
4.	"Dheema Dheema Chatira Spandana"	Bapu Goswami	Babushan
5.	"Abak Akash Aji Rahichhi"	Nimami Mohanty	Goodly Rath, Tapu Mishra
6.	"Hrudaya Keuthi Thaye"	Nimami Mohanty	Goodly Rath
7.	"Priya Priya Mo Priya"	Dr. Nirmal Nayak	Udit Narayan
