= Ishq Tu Hi Tu =

- Directed by: Tapas Sargharia
- Screenplay by: Tapas Sargharia
- Story by: Tapas Sargharia
- Produced by: Jagi Mangat Panda
- Starring: Arindam Roy; Elina Samantray; Aparajita Mohanty; Mihir Das
- Cinematography: Rabindra Behera
- Music by: Abhijit Majumdar
- Production company: Tarang Cine Productions
- Release date: 14 January 2015
- Country: India
- Language: Odia

Ishq Tu Hi Tu is a 2015 Indian Odia-language drama film written by Tapas Sargharia and produced by Tarang Cine Productions. It stars Arindam Roy and Elina Samantray in lead roles while Aparajita Mohanty and Mihir Das play supporting roles.

== Plot ==
The movie is based on inter-community love. The storyline is based on 1991 communal riots in Dhamnagar area of Bhadrak district.

== Cast ==
- Arindam Roy as Swadhin
- Elina Samantray as Simran
- Aparajita Mohanty
- Mihir Das
- Minaketan Das
- Samaresh Routray
