= Ei To Jeebon =

- এই তো জীবন
- Directed by: Biplob Sarkar
- Written by: Biplob Srakar
- Starring: Suman Islam Tulika Basu Dipanwita Biswas Biswajit Chakraborty Biplab Chatterjee Kalyan Chatterjee Pulakita Ghosh Bodhisattva Mazumdar Kharaj Mukherjee Biplob Sarkar
- Edited by: Jayanta Laha
- Music by: Dev Goswain
- Production company: Suhanee Films
- Release date: 13 January 2017
- Country: India
- Language: Bengali

Ei To Jeebon is a Bengali drama film, directed by Biplob Sarkar.The music was released by Amara Muzik.

== Soundtrack ==
No	Title	Artist	Lengths
1	Aaj Tui Ekla	Abhishek Sinha Roy	5:04
2	Maa	Raghab Chatterjee	4:06
3	Jiban Re	Rupankar	5:02
4	Kakhono Bhabini	Abhishek Sinha Roy and Anwesha Datta Gupta	4:38
5	Ektuku Chowa Lage	Abhishek Sinha Roy and Anwesha Datta Gupta	4:23
