= Daha Balunga =

- Directed by: Sudhakar Vasanth
- Written by: Bapu Goswami
- Produced by: Pupinder Singh; Bapi Panda
- Starring: Babushaan; Sanjana; Jackie Shroff; Bijay Mohanty; Tandra Ray; Aparajita; Pintu Nanda
- Cinematography: Ramesh Krishna; K.V. Ramana
- Release date: 12 July 2013
- Country: India
- Language: Odia

Daha Balunga is a 2013 Indian Odia language drama featured film directed by Sudhakar Vasanth. The film stars Babushaan, Sanjana Mitra and Jackie Shroff. Abhijit Majumdar is the music director. This film marked the debut of Jackie Shroff in Odia cinema.

== Cast ==
- Babushaan as Omkar Mohanty
- Sanjana Mitra as Ruby
- Jackie Shroff as Arun Singh Deo
- Bijay Mohanty as Uttam Mohanty
- Tandra Ray as Mamata Mohanty
- Aparajita Mohanty as Arun's wife
- Pintu Nanda as Bikram
- Sonia Sarkar Dey as Shalini
- Praygan Khatua as Chingidi
- Saroj Das as Principal
- Choudhury Jayaprakash Das as Saler
- Trupti Sinha as Jeje Maa

== Production ==
The film was made as an Odia-Bengali bilingual and was shot in Mumbai and Thailand.

== Music ==
Song	Singer	Track length
Daha Balunga	Govind Chandra, Asima Panda	3:52
Anta 26	Abhijit Majumdar	3:36
Maula Maula	Sohini Mishra, Babushan	3:32
Akhi Kholile Tu	Javed Ali	4:20
Jaithili Badi Pata Ku	Pamela Jain	4:26
Pyar Pyar Pyar	Raja Hasan	4:39
