= Amara Muzik =

Indian Music Company

- Native name: ଆମର ମ୍ୟୁଜିକ
- Company type: Private
- Industry: Music, Entertainment
- Genre: Various
- Founded: 2015
- Headquarters: Chennai, India
- Website: http://www.amaramuzik.in/

Amara Muzik is a music label with rights to some of the latest top Odia, Gujarati, Bengali and Chhattisgarhi music.

== History ==
The company was founded in 2015 by Naveen Bhandari who now serves as the CEO, managing director of the company. It is headquartered at Chennai, India. In 2015 the company made their catalogue available worldwide through online digital stores including YouTube, iTunes, Apple Music, Deezer, Spotify, Google Play, Amazon Music, JioSaavn, Gaana etc. and on mVAS (WAP, IVR, RBT) across telecom operators. In 2016, Amara Muzik diversified its market in Bengal.

In 2016, Amara Muzik acquired the audio-video catalogue of Micro Broadcasting Corporation (MBC) for an undisclosed amount. The catalogue consists of 160 Odia songs acquired for a perpetual tenure.

In April 2016, Amara Muzik launched the music of one of the most anticipated Odia Movie Agastya.

In September 2017, Amara Muzik Odia channel crosses a milestone of 1,00,000 subscribers on YouTube, the popular video-sharing website.

In 2017, Amara Muzik forayed into 2 other regional languages - Chhattisgarhi and Rajasthani. They also started acquiring and promoting Bengali shortfilms.

In 2018, Amara Muzik expanded into a production wing for producing movies in Odia and Chhattisgarhi languages and named it Amara Studios. Amara Studios has announced 6 movies both in Odia and Chhattisgarhi.

In 2021, Amara Muzik started acquiring content in the Gujarati space with the likes of Gaman Santhal, Jignesh Barot, Rohit Thakor and more.

== Short films released by Amara Muzik ==
Following are the list of notable Short Films by Amara Muzik.

Year	Short Film	Language
2017	Entho	Bengali
2017	Marichika	Odia
2017	Charitra	Odia
2018	Baalir Niche Jawler Shabda	Bengali
2017	Goolaam	Odia
2017	Who	Bengali
2017	Bastur Khoje	Bengali
2017	Katakuti	Bengali
2017	Mela - The Fair	Bengali
2017	Baanshiwala	Bengali
2017	The Feelmaker	Bengali
2017	Hothat Dekha	Bengali
2017	EYELINER	Bengali
2017	Oasis	Bengali
2017	The Forlorn	Bengali

== Music albums released by Amara Muzik ==
Following are the list of notable music albums by Amara Muzik.

ODIA
YEAR	ALBUM
2018	Lemme Fall for you
2018	Sawariya
2018	Dil Se
2018	Janena Ki Tu Mo Valentine 2
2019	Barajatia Rum
2019	Jete Thara Dekhile Bi Tate
2018	To Prema Mo Duniya
2018	Love Fever
2018	Deewana Heli toh pain
2019	Awara Dil
2018	Sufiyana
2018	Baap Ka Maal
2018	Prema Rutu
2018	Mana Pakhi
2019	O Re Priya
2018	Twins
2018	Hai Re
2018	Hrudaya Ra Sunyata
2018	Ae Desha Ama Maa
2019	Mo bhai Ku Nei Aa
2018	Stupid Love
2018	Om Gan Ganapataye Namah
2018	Ranjhana
2018	Happy Birthday Beauty Queen
2018	Satare Nahele Nahin
2018	Tu Pheri Aa
2018	Prathama Prema
2018	Dheere Dheere
2018	Toh Nirabata
2018	Tu Pheri Aa
2018	O Balma
2018	i'm in Love
2018	Jenni
2018	Jharaka Sepate Barsha
2018	Re Parichaya
2018	Maa
2018	Tu Pheri Aa
2018	Ishqiyan
2018	Tu Pheri Aa
2018	Lemme Fall For You
2018	Happy Birthday Bhaijaan
2018	Jaana Jaana
2018	DreamGirl
2017	Tuma Otha tale
2017	Premagrantha
2017	Soniye
2017	Nirabata
2017	Me Before you
2017	Toh Bina
2017	Toh Ishq Re
2017	Aaashiqui
2017	MUSAFIR
2017	Patajhara
2017	Saathiya
2017	Nagei De Bhoga
2017	Toh Rakhi
2017	Kalia Balia Mo Dui Bhai
2017	Manimaa by ASHA BHOSLE
2017	Last Summer
2017	Deewana Deewani
2017	The BB Song
2017	Saajna

HINDI
Year	Album
2018	Aao Na
2017	Freedom at 70 ( Sare Jahan Se Accha)
2017	Tere Liya Zindagi
2017	Musafir
2017	Pyaar Ke Pal

BENGALI
YEAR	ALBUM
2019	Tomar Kothay
2018	Dil ki doya
2018	Abhimani
2018	Klanto mon
2018	Cholo dekha hok
2018	Jaak Shob Chole Jaak
2017	Maa Ashche
2017	Maa Elo Re
2017	Monkharaper Gaan
2017	Ekta Chithi Tor
2017	KEU PRASHNO TOLENI
2017	Mehul

GUJARATI
YEAR	ALBUM
2021	Pan Tame Kya Khovai Gaya
2021	Matlabi
2021	Kyarek To Mane Yaad Re Karo
2021	Tu Mari Na Thai Hu Taro Na Thayo
2021	Tari Yaadmaa Zindagi Jaavani

== Film music released by Amara Muzik ==
Following are the list of notable music albums released by Amara Muzik.

Film	Language
Uraan	Bengali
O Bondhu Amar	Bengali
Drishyantar	Bengali
Reunion	Bengali
Kuasha Jakhon	Bengali
Flat No 609	Bengali
Happy Pill	Bengali
E Tumi Kemon Tumi	Bengali
Ka Kha Ga Gha	Bengali
Maahiya	Bengali
Hariye Jawa	Bengali
Popcorn	Bengali
Comrade	Bengali
Chitrokar	Bengali
Michael	Bengali
Curzon Er Kalom	Bengali
Adhunik	Bengali
Barandab	Bengali
Guhamanab	Bengali
Bhalobashar Bari	Bengali
Bilu Rakkhosh	Bengali
Kichu Na Bola Kotha	Bengali
K: Secret Eye	Bengali
Arani Takhon	Bengali
Durga Sohay	Bengali
Meher Aali	Bengali
Poran Bondhu Re	Bengali
MandoBasar Galpo	Bengali
The Oasis	Bengali
The Forlorn	Bengali
Ei To Jeebon	Bengali
Aroni Takhon	Bengali
Kuheli	Bengali
Ludo	Bengali
Antarleen	Bengali
Romantic Noy	Bengali
TEENANKO	Bengali
Hothat Dekha	Bengali
Kiriti O Kalo Bhromor	Bengali
Potadar Kirtee	Bengali
Mister Bhaduri	Bengali
VIRUS	Bengali
Shaheb Bibi Golaam	Bengali
Praktan	Bengali
Bastu-Shaap	Bengali
Jenana	Bengali
Neerajanam	Telugu
Pehla Adhi Akshar	Gujarati
Prem ke Bandhna	Chhattisgarhi
Dhartiput	Chhattisgarhi
Kariya Mahadev	Chhattisgarhi
36garh Ke Handsome	Chhattisgarhi
Nag Aau Arjun	Chhattisgarhi
Raju Dilwala	Chhattisgarhi
Aashiq Maya Wale	Chattissgarhi
Teen Than Bhokwa	Chattissgarhi
Mayaru Ganga	Chattissgarhi
Mister Tetku Ram	Chattissgarhi
Lagan Mora Sajan Se	Chattissgarhi
Raja Chhatisgarhiya 2	Chhattisgarhi
Krishna	Odia
Rahasya	Odia
Dil Se	Odia
Mu Khanti Odia Jhia	Odia
Badmash Toka	Odia
Kabula Barabula Searching Laila	Odia
Tike Khara Tike Chhai	Odia
Chaai Pari Rahithibi	Odia
Sita Rama Nka Bahaghara Kali Jugare	Odia
The End	Odia
Mana Mora Jajabara	Odia
Mu Bhabuchi Kichhi	Odia
Gunda	Odia
Balighara	Odia
Bay	Odia
Sweet Heart	Odia
Bye Bye Dubai	Odia
Revenge	Odia
Agastya	Odia
Zabardast Premika	Odia
Hela Mate Prema Jara	Odia
Gote Suaa Gote Sari	Odia
Tu Kahibu Na Mu	Odia
Ashique	Odia
Jouthi Tu Seithi Mu	Odia
Kehi Nuhen Kahara	Odia
Lekhichhi Naa Tora	Odia
Love You Hamesha	Odia
Maya	Odia
God Father	Odia
Mo Dil Kahe Illu Illu	Odia
To Sathe Bandha Mo Jibana Dori	Odia
Tume Thile Sathire	Odia
Ashok Samrat	Odia
Khei Jane Bhala Lage Re	Odia
Salam Cinema	Odia
Panchamurta	Odia
Sapatha	Odia
Thookol	Odia
Gud Boy	Odia
Matric Fail	Odia
Idiot	Odia
Rangeela Toka	Odia
Jaggu Autowallah	Odia
Sala Budha	Odia
Bandhan	Odia
Mu Premi Mu Pagal	Odia
Balunga Toka	Odia
Kichi Khata Kichi Mitha	Odia
Loafer	Odia
Daibee Krupa	Odia
Jai Jagannatha	Odia
Talophotoka	Odia
Hey Baba Saburi Mallik Tume	Odia
Nimdaru	Odia
Khare Kalia	Odia
Chandan Chhita	Odia
I'm Mad For You	Odia
Adim Vichar	Odia
Sahara Jaluchi	Odia
