= Super Michhua =

- Directed by: Ashok Pati
- Produced by: Sitaram Agrawal
- Starring: Babushaan Mohanty; Jhilik; Aparajita; Minaketan
- Music by: Bikash Das
- Distributed by: Sarthak Production
- Release date: 12 June 2015
- Country: India
- Language: Odia

Super Michhua is a 2015 Indian Odia-language film, directed by Ashok Pati and produced by Sarthak Films. It stars Babushan and Jhilik Bhattacharjee in lead roles while Aparajita Mohanty and Minaketan play supporting roles. A remake of the 2005 Tamil movie Priyasakhi, it was released on Raja alongside Gapa Hele bi Sata and Love You Hamesha. The film was a box office success.

== Cast ==
- Babushan
- Aparajita Mohanty
- Jhilik Bhatacharjee

== Soundtrack ==
1. "Kemiti Kahibi Tate"
2. "Super Micchua" (Title Song)
3. "Kut Kut Dhana Lo"
4. "Sunyata Ku Pachare Jebe"
5. "Tu Mora Mandira"
