= Chinmay =

Chinmay is a given name. Notable people with the name include:

- Chinmay Mandlekar (born 1979), Indian stage director
- Chinmay Udgirkar (fl. from 2009), Indian actor
