= Bou Buttu Bhuta =

2025 Indian Odia language film

- Theatrical release poster
- Directed by: Jagdish Mishra
- Screenplay by: Mohammad Imran
- Dialogues by: Pranab Prasanna Rath
- Story by: Mohammad Imran
- Produced by: Trupti Satapathy
- Starring: Babushaan Mohanty; Archita Sahu; Aparajita Mohanty
- Cinematography: Rudrakanta Singh
- Edited by: Rashmi Ranjan Dash
- Music by: Background score: Abhishek Panigrahi; Songs: Gaurav Anand
- Production company: Babushaan Films
- Distributed by: Prakash Films
- Release date: 12 June 2025
- Running time: 176 minutes
- Country: India
- Language: Odia

Bou Buttu Bhuta (Note: /bou buʈu bʱut̪ɔ/; Odia pronunciation transl. Mother, Buttu, and the Ghost) is a 2025 Indian Odia-language horror thriller comedy directed by Jagdish Mishra and produced by Trupti Satapathy under Babushaan Films. The film stars Babushaan Mohanty and Archita Sahu in the lead roles, alongside Aparajita Mohanty. The music was composed by Gaurav Anand, with the background score by Abhishek Panigrahi.

The film follows Buttu, a fish farmer who leaves his village in search of work but becomes entangled in supernatural events, with his mother trying to protect him.

Bou Buttu Bhuta was theatrically released on 12 June 2025, coinciding with Raja Parba. It is the highest-grossing Odia film.

== Plot ==
In a rural village, Buttu, a struggling fish farmer, lives with his mother, Ratnamala, a sorceress. Yearning for better prospects elsewhere, Buttu is unable to leave due to financial constraints. Rinki, the village doctor's daughter, is in love with him. One night, while returning home, Buttu is possessed by the ghost of Amari (played by a National School of Drama, Delhi alumnus), a villager murdered by the community. The possession triggers a chain of eerie and suspenseful events, as the ghost-inhabited Buttu interacts with Rinki and Ratnamala, creating moments of fear and mystery. The film concludes with an open-ended resolution, hinting at a possible sequel.

== Cast ==
- Babushaan Mohanty as Buttu
- Archita Sahu as Rinki
- Aparajita Mohanty as Ratnamala
- Mangu Kumar Sahoo as Psycho Babuo
- Jagannath Seth as Amari
- Choudhury Jayaprakash Das as Rinki's Father/Homeopathic Doctor
- Papun Dehury as Romeo
- Krishna Kar as Bideshi
- Rabi Mishra as Constable Mamu
- Angulia Bunty as Sanei
- Udit Guru as Somu
- Aanisha Mahakur as Young Ratnamala
- Robin Das as Lingaraj (Lee)
- Mandakini Jena as Possessed Woman 1
- Cookies Swain as Item number in 'Dungu Thili' song

== Soundtrack ==
Bou Buttu Bhuta

Soundtrack album by Gaurav Anand
- Genre: Feature film soundtrack
- Language: Odia
- Label: Sidharth Music

The music was composed by Gaurav Anand.

Track listing
No.	Title	Writer(s)	Singer(s)	Length
1.	"Oda Lage"	Bapu Goswami	Babushaan Mohanty, Subhashree Jena	04:58
2.	"Dungu Thili"	Dr. Nirmal Nayak	Kuldeep Pattanaik, Antara Chakraborty, Bunty Anugulia	04:29
3.	"Laal Tuk Tuk"	Dr. Nirmal Nayak	Aparajita Mohanty	05:46
4.	"Dian Jara"	J.P Wordsmith	Gaurav Anand, Abhishek Panigrahi	04:17
Total length:				19:00

== Release ==
This movie was released on 12 June 2025 during mid-night in 61 theatres across Odisha.

== Box office ==
Bou Buttu Bhuta had an opening day collection of ₹40 lakh. The film grossed ₹6.15 crore in 7 days, ₹20 crore in 50 days and became the highest grossing Odia film of all time.
