= Bhaunri =

Bhaunri-The sinking Reality
- Directed by: Sudhanshu Mohan Sahoo
- Screenplay by: Dilip Choudhury
- Story by: Ratnakar Rout
- Produced by: Atish Kumar Rout
- Starring: Arindam Roy; Bidita Bag; Mihir Das
- Cinematography: Sanjeev Mohapatra
- Music by: Abhijeet Majumdar
- Production company: Ritupriya Films
- Release date: 1 January 2015
- Running time: 150 minutes
- Country: India
- Language: Odia

Bhaunri is a 2015 Odia art-house film directed by Sudhanshu Mohan Sahoo and starring Arindam Roy and Mihir Das. This is the debut Odia film of Bollywood actress Bidita Bag. The movie was released to great fanfare in Bhubaneshwar and Cuttack on 1 January 2015 and was well received.

== Plot ==
External videos
- Official Trailer on YouTube
- Official Song on YouTube

The word "bhaunri" means "the whirlpool". Whirlpool is the force that never allows any object to stay afloat. Whatever comes close to the whirlpool has to sink. A nation does not mean the lines drawn on a map. A nation is composed of its citizen and its social, political and spiritual principles, laid down by the wisdom (or lack thereof) of the nation builders. The story of Bhaunri reveals how those principles are used to exploit marginalized people in the state of Odisha.

The story revolves around Nandu, son of a bonded tribal laborer who never saw the value of schooling for his son.

Dibakar, a social worker with an ideology combining leftism and pragmatism, helps Nandu get into school, but the immorality of his teacher drives Nandu from the educational system. The film flashes forward to the present, where Nandu has become a bonded cowboy at a young age. Nandu's family is paid Rs.10/- per day in exchange for his labor.

Saraba is like a brother to Nandu. He grows with his simple curious lies. Nandu meets a girl called Janha and there is love at first sight between them. In the meantime Nandu's father falls ill and due to lack of medical facilities the old man becomes paralyzed and bedridden. The local capitalist Jitu is a depicted as a villain. He exploits people wherever possible. He becomes attracted to Janha and one day tries to molest her, but gets beaten up by Nandu. Jitu has strong political connections. The line officers of that area are controlled by Jitu. Though the political bodies of the area are reserved for the tribal people, Jitu gets his sycophants elected every time. The power stays with him. Nandu marries Janha. On the first night of their marriage, Nandu's house is set on fire by Jitu's men. Janha stands by Nandu's side to start fresh. Nandu and Janha attempt to rebuild the house. From this their miseries start again, as the police arrest Nandu on false charges. Meanwhile, Nandu's father dies. From the funeral Nandu escapes with Janha. Before the police can kill Nandu and Janha, they are rescued by the armed Maoists. Dibakar is the leader of that group. Nandu and Janha's frustrations drive then to become members of the banned organization. Janha is eventually caught by the police and is sent to the local jail. Nandu kills Jitu as the organization thinks that Jitu is the police informer responsible for Janha's arrest. Then Dibakar plans an attack on the jail to loot weapons and rescue imprisoned cadres, including Janha. In that operation Janha is shot in the crossfire and, unable to get timely medical attention, dies, with her last breath revealing that she was pregnant. Nandu realizes that the gun can only kill. It can't build a new society; the film concludes with Nandu turning his attention to the figure of Mahatma Gandhi, the preacher of truth and non-violence.

== Cast ==
- Arindam Roy as Nandu
- Bidita Bag as Janha
- Mihir Das as Maoist Leader
- Manoj Mishra as Jitu Sahukar

== Soundtracks ==
1. Raghupati Raghava
2. Pahada Parbata Jamure
3. Dunguri Pahada Tale
4. Alasi Janha Mo Priyare
5. A Siali Bane

== Achievements ==
The film had a good run in theatres all over Odisha. It was selected for the Kalaghoda Art Festival in Mumbai and was screened three times.
