= God Father (2016 film) =

God Father-True Story of a Man
- Directed by: Ramesh Rout
- Story by: Jugansu Sekhar Panda
- Produced by: Jugansu Sekhar Panda; Chaturbhuja Films
- Starring: Siddhanta Mahapatra; Anu Choudhury; Daitari Panda; Manoj Mishra; Sashreek Samarth Mishra; Ananya Mishra
- Music by: Abhijit Majumdar
- Release date: 27 December 2016
- Country: India
- Language: Odia
- Budget: 2 crores
- Box office: 50 crores

God Father is an Odia film and is the second release by Chaturbhuja Films. The film was produced by Jugansu Sekhar Panda and directed by Ramesh Rout. The music was composed by Abhijit Majumdar and the dialogue written by Nirmal Nayak.This Remake in Malayalam as Lucifer (2019).The film stars Siddhanta Mahapatra and Anu Choudhury. It is the highest-grossing Odia movie of 2016 and held the record until the release of Daman (2022). The film's music soundtrack was released in December 2016 by Amara Muzik. The film was dubbed in Bengali.

== Plot ==
God Father revolves around a man who becomes popular in his village by doing good work while surrounded by gangsters who try to ruin his works.

== Cast ==
- Siddhanta Mahapatra
- Anu Choudhury
- Sashreek Samarth Mishra
- Ananya Mishra
- Manisha Mishra
- Daitari Panda
- Rakhi Sawant as item number "Chuti Kholile"
- Manoj Mishra

== Soundtrack ==
The music was composed by Abhijit Majumdar and released by Amara Muzik.

God Father

Soundtrack album by Abhijit Majumdar
- Released: 26 December 2016
- Recorded: 2016
- Genre: Soundtrack
- Length: 25:37
- Label: Amara Muzik
- Producer: Abhijit Majumdar

Abhijit Majumdar chronology
Samaya Bada Balaban (2016)	God Father (2016)	Shakti - The Lion Heart (2018)

Track list
No.	Title	Lyrics	Singer(s)	Length
1.	"Chuti Kholile"	Nirmal Nayak	Pamela Jain	4:12
2.	"Godfather Title"	Nirmal Nayak	Vinod Rathod; Navya Jaiti	1:10
3.	"Omm Namah Sibaya"	Nirmal Nayak	Vinod Rathod	4:40
4.	"Saloni Saloni"	Nizam	Mohammed Irfan; Tapu Mishra	5:44
5.	"Yebe Mo Bina"	Nirmal Nayak	Javed Ali	5:14
6.	"Pyar Wala"	Nirmal Nayak	Abhijit Majumdar; Navya Jaiti	4:37
Total length:				25:37
