= Love Pain Kuch Bhi Karega =

- Directed by: Ashok Pati
- Produced by: Tarang Cine Productions
- Starring: Babushaan Mohanty; Supriya Nayak; Mihir Das; Ushasi Misha
- Production company: Tarang Cine Productions
- Release date: 7 October 2016
- Country: India
- Language: Odia

Love Pain Kuch Bhi Karega is a 2016 Indian Odia-language drama film directed by Ashok Pati and produced by Tarang Cine Productions. It stars Babushan and Supriya Nayak in the lead roles while Usasi Mishra and Mihir Das play supporting roles.

== Plot ==
The movie is based on a love story, where actor Babushan falls in love with a teenage girl.

The love affair of Sanju and Parinita is not approved by her father, who has fixed her marriage with the captain of a cricket team. In order to win her hand, Sanju has to play a match against him.

== Cast ==
- Babushan as Sanju
- Supriya Nayak as Parinita
- Usasi Mishra
- Mihir Das
