= Bhala Pae Tate 100 Ru 100 =

- Directed by: Sudhanshu Sahu
- Written by: Ranjit Patnaik
- Produced by: Sitaram Agrawal
- Starring: Babushaan Mohanty; Sheetal Patra; Harihara Mahapatra
- Music by: Bikash Das
- Production company: Sarthak
- Release date: 18 October 2015
- Running time: 160 minutes
- Country: India
- Language: Odia

External videos
- Official Trailer on YouTube

Bhala Pae Tate 100 Ru 100 is a 2015 Indian Odia language action comedy film directed by Sudhanshu Sahu. Babushan and Sheetal Patra play the lead roles in the film. The movie is a remake of 2007 Kannada movie Krishna whose second half was based on the 2002 Tamil movie Unnai Ninaithu.

== Plot ==
An orphan named Babushan, who works as TV anchor in one of the most popular shows on Sarthak TV, lives in rent with Hari. All goes well for Babushan until he rejects the advances of his landlord's daughter; the reasons for his actions become clear as this story unfolds.

== Cast ==
- Babushan as Rahul
- Sheetal as Puja/Priya
- Suryamayee Mahapatra as Sudha
- Harihara Mahapatra as Dilkhush
- Prutiviraj Nayak
- Amit Pani
- Debashis Parta
- Pupul Bhuyan

== Box office ==
The film did a good business in theatres across Odisha and declared as Hit. It was well received by the Audience and given positive reviews from critics.

== Soundtrack ==
Bhala Pae Tate 100 Ru 100

Film score by Bikash Das
- Released: 18 October 2015
- Recorded: 2015
- Studio: Zee Sarthak
- Genre: Feature Film Soundtrack,
- Language: Odia
- Director: Sudhanshu Sahu
- Producer: Sitaram Agrawal

All music is composed by Bikash Das.

Original Tracklist
No.	Title	Artist(s)	Length
1.	"Title Song"	Namita Agrawal, Sourin Bhatt
2.	"Bhala Pae Mun Tate Sahe Ru Sahe"	Sourin, Namita Agrawal
3.	"Mayabini Bana Jochhana"	Babushan
4.	"Jete Thara Tu Pacharu Mote"	Saurin, Namita Agrawal

== Release ==
Bhala Pae Tate 100 ru 100 was released during Durga Puja on 18 October 2015.
