= Buddhaditya Mohanty =

Indian actor

- Born: Gumphul; 17 January 1978 (age 47); Cuttack
- Occupation: Actor
- Years active: 2002 - present
- Relatives: Mahasweta Ray (aunt); Aparajita Mohanty (aunt); Uttam Mohanty (uncle); Babushan Mohanty (cousin)

Buddhaditya Mohanty is an Indian actor. He was born in Cuttack, completed his schooling at Stewart School, Cuttack and his college education at Ravenshaw College. After that he studied at Delhi University. He works in Mumbai as well as in Odisha. He has worked in a number of successful serials including Meher (tv series), Stree-Teri Kahani, Kumkum, Waaris, Prratima and Kya hua tera wada.

== Personal life ==
Buddhaditya Mohanty born to actress Malavika Ray and doctor Badal Mohanty. His maternal grandfather Rajkishore Raya was renowned writer from Odisha. Aparajita Mohanty and Mahasweta Ray are his aunts. Odia film veteran Babushaan Mohanty is his cousin brother.

== Filmography ==
Films	Year
Delivery Boy	2023
Astika Nastika	2022
Sriman Surdas	2019
Bye Bye Dubai	2016
Jaga hatare pagha	2015
Sangam	2012(released in 2014)
Om Sai Ram	2012
Loafer	2011
Tu Thile mo Dara Kahaku	2011
Prem Rogi	2009
Pagala Karichi Paunji Tora	2009
Kou Duniya Ru asila bandhu	2009
Nandini I Love You	2008
I Love My India	2007

== Television ==
Shows	Year
Kumkum	2002
Meher	2004
Prratima	2004
Waaris	2008
Stree Teri kahani	2006
Kya Hua Tera Vaada	2012
Sadhaba bohu	2011–present
