= Sriman Surdas =

2018 film by Ashok Pati

- Directed by: Ashok Pati
- Written by: Ranjit Pattnaik
- Screenplay by: Ashok Pati
- Produced by: Tarang Cine Productions
- Starring: Babushaan Mohanty; Buddhaditya Mohanty; Mihir Das; Bhoomika Dash
- Cinematography: Sitanshu Mahapatra
- Edited by: Sukumar Mani
- Music by: Abhijit Majumdar
- Release date: 16 October 2018 (Odisha)
- Running time: 157 min
- Country: India
- Language: Odia

Sriman Surdas is a 2018 Indian Odia language action comedy film directed by Ashok Pati and Produced under banner Tarang Cine Productions. It is a remake of the 2017 Telugu film Andhhagadu. Babushaan and Bhoomika Dash played lead roles in the film.

== Cast ==
- Babushan as Sriman Surdas
- Buddhaditya Mohanty
- Mihir Das
- Bhoomika Dash
- Salil Mitra
- Bobby Mishra

== Production ==
Actress Bhoomika Dash was roped to play lead role opposite actor Babushan. Veteran actor Mihir Das was seen in a negative role in the movie.

== Soundtrack ==
Sriman Surdas

Film score by Abhijit Majumdar
- Released: 24 September 2018
- Recorded: 2018
- Genre: Feature Film Soundtrack
- Length: 26.64
- Language: Odia
- Director: Ashok Pati
- Producer: Tarang Cine Productions

The music of this film is composed by Abhijit Majumdar and released on 24 September 2018.

All lyrics are written by Nirmal Nayak; all music is composed by Abhijit Majumdar.

Original Tracklist
| No. | Title | Singer(s) | Length |
|---|---|---|---|
| 1. | "Chipudi Delu Dilta" | Humane Sagar | 03.18 |
| 2. | "Pal Pal Chahen" | Swayam Padhi, Rajnandini | 05:11 |
| 3. | "Sriman Surdas" | Satyajeet Pradhan | 04:26 |
| 4. | "Jeans Wali Sathire Accident" | Pamela Jain, Tarique Aziz | 04:05 |
| 5. | "Khuda Kasam" | Swayam Padhi, Antara Chakrabarty | 05:07 |
| 6. | "Dusshera ru milijau Balma" | Kaushik | 03:49 |
| 7. | "Jibana Emiti Bajitae" | Karunakar, Lipsa, Sayini | 01:48 |
| Total length: | | | 26.64 |

== Release ==
Sriman Surdas hit theatre on 16 October 2018 during Durga Puja.
