= Arindam Roy =

India actor

Arindam Ray
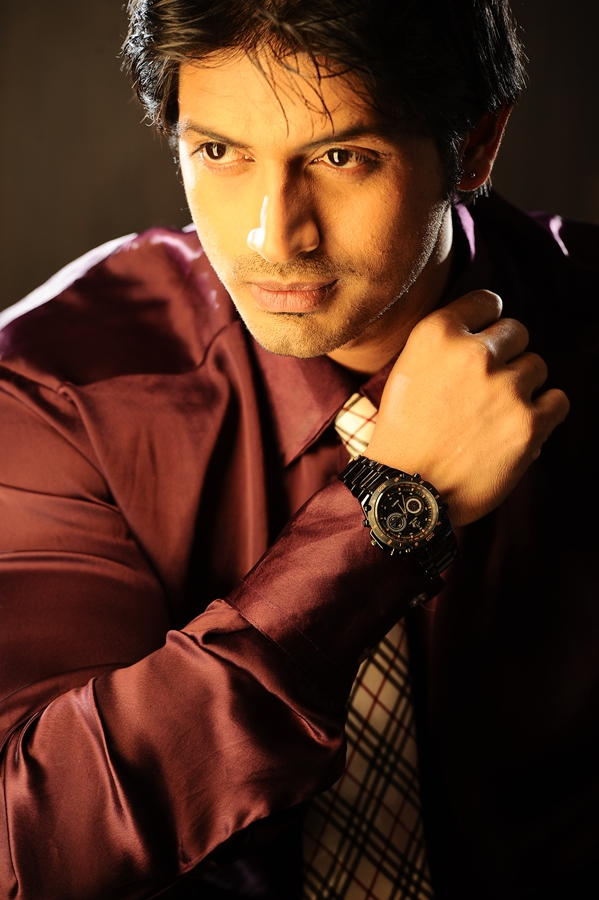
- Born: Arindam Ray; 29 March 1984 (age 42); Cuttack, Odisha (formerly Orissa)
- Other names: Rontu, Muna
- Occupations: Actor, Politician
- Years active: 2006-present
- Political party: Bharatiya Janata Party
- Other political affiliations: Biju Janata Dal
- Spouse: Anupa Das
- Children: 1 (son)
- Relatives: Ashok Kumar Das (father in law); Pranab Prakash Das (brother in law)

Arindam Roy (also spelled Arindam Ray) is a politician and actor who works predominantly in Odia cinema apart from a few Bengali films.

== Personal life ==
Arindam Ray born to Gopal Chandra Ray in a Karan family. He married Anupa Das, daughter of Ashok Kumar Das and younger sister of Pranab Prakash Das. In 2024 Odisha Assembly election, he contested Salipur Assembly constituency from Bharatiya Janata Party ticket & lost to Biju Janata Dal candidate in the margin of 7,594 votes.

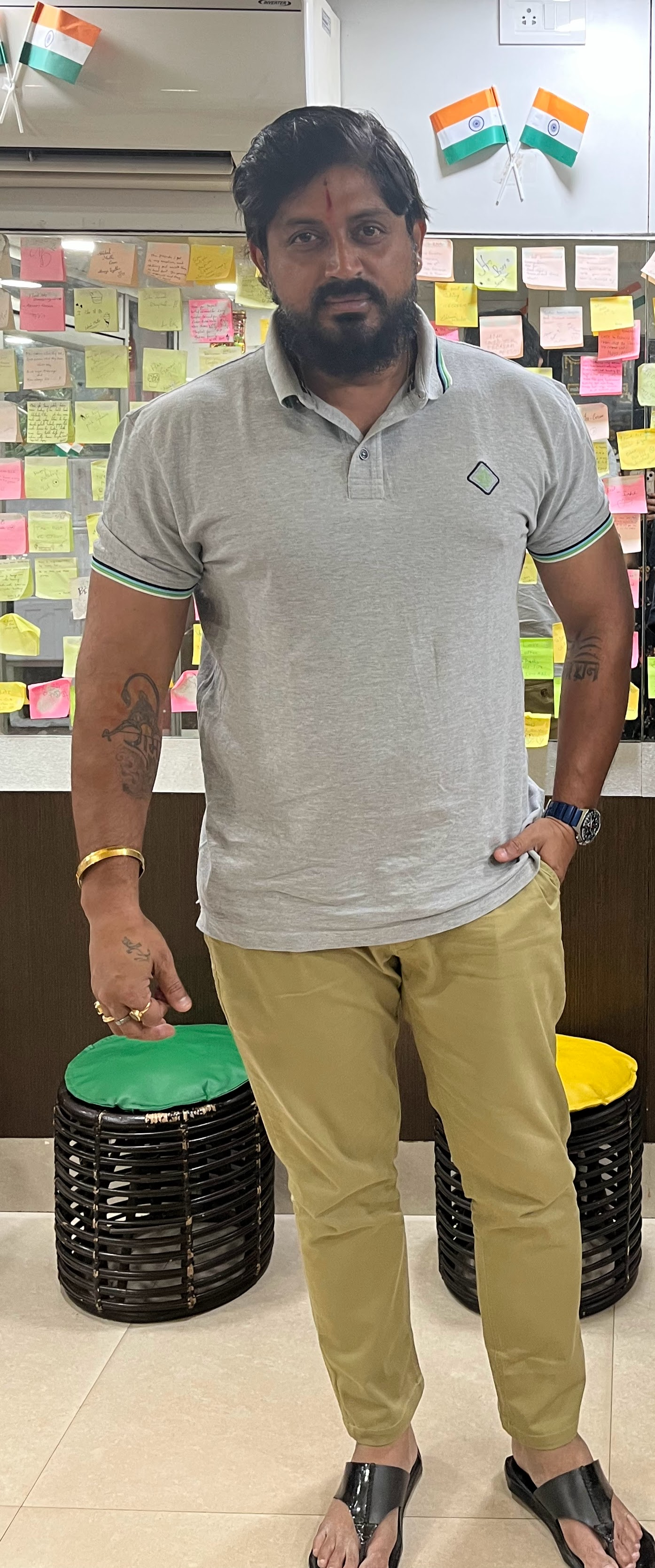
Arindam Roy in April 2025.

== Career ==
Arindam Roy is an Indian actor who works in the Odia film industry and Bengali film industry. When he went to Bengali Industry, he changed his stage name to Rishi before changing it back to his original name. Regarding his performance in the film Target Kolkata, a critic wrote that "Arindam Roy acted well, but if he wants to make a future in Tollywood, he needs to work on his Bengali diction". His Odia film Babu Bhaijaan was the last film before COVID-19 pandemic. After pandemic his movie RAM released in silver screens. It was under his home banner Ratna films (4th movie under this banner).

== Filmography ==
Year	Films	Role	Notes	Ref.
2006	Prema Rutu Asilare		Debut Film	
2007	Kalishankar	Bikram		
2007	To Pain Nebi Mu Sahe Janama			
2007	Mu Tate Love Karuchi			
2007	E Mana Manena			
2007	Lal Tuku Tuku Sadhaba Bohu			
2008	Takkar	Arun	Bengali film	
2008	Mu Sapanara Soudagara	Chandan		
2008	Tomar Jonyo	Joseph	Bengali film	
2009	Olot Palot	Tabun	Bengali film	
2009	Path Jadi Na Sesh Hoy	Aranyo	Bengali film	
2009	Romeo - The Lover Boy			Extended Cameo Apperence
2009	Mitare Mita			
2009	Tume Hi Sathi Mora			
2010	Mon Niye	Raju	Bengali film	
2011	Tu Mo Girl Friend	Bunty		
2011	Hero - Prem Katha	Hero		
2011	Criminal	Munna		
2011	Piya Tumi	Akash	Bengali film	
2012	Gud Boy	Raja		
2012	Raja Jhia Sathe Heigala Bhaba	Balaram Sahu (Balia)		
2012	Parshuram			
2013	Paribeni Kehi Alaga Kari	Deba		
2013	Target Kolkata	Gonga	Bengali Film	
2013	Ashok Samrat	Ashok, Samrat		
2013	Mu Raja Tu Rani	Biju		
2015	Bhaunri	Nandu		
2015	Ishq Tu Hi Tu	Raghu		
2015	Love You Hamesha	Raja		
2015	Kalki			
2016	Premare Premare	Om		
2016	Tora Dine Ku Mora Dine			
2017	Romeo Juliet			
2017	Shiva Not Out	Shiva		
2018	Ishq Puni Thare			
2020	Babu Bhaijaan			
2023	RAM	Ram, Karan		

== Awards and nominations ==
- 2006: Won Odisha State Film Award for Best Actor for Prema Rutu Asilare (2006)
- 2012: Won ETV Odia Award for Best Actor for Raja Jhia Sange Heigala Bhaba (2012)
- 2013: Won Odisha State Film Award for Best Actor for Mu Raja Tu Rani (2013)
- 2014: Nominated for Filmfare Award for Best Actor (Oriya) for Ashok Samrat (2013)
