= Sister Sridevi =

2017 film by Ashok Pati

- Theatrical release poster
- Directed by: Ashok Pati
- Screenplay by: Ashok Pati
- Produced by: Tarang Cine Productions
- Starring: Babushaan; Sivani Sangita; Aparajita Mohanty; Mihir Das
- Edited by: Sukumar Mani
- Music by: Abhijit Majumdar
- Production company: Tarang Cine Productions
- Distributed by: Tarang Cine Productions
- Release date: 9 June 2017 (India)
- Country: India
- Language: Odia

Sister Sridevi is a 2017 Indian Odia-language romantic comedy film produced by Tarang Cine Productions. Babushaan and Sivani Sangita, with Mihir Das and Aparajita Mohanty are in supporting role. The movie is a remake of 2016 Tamil movie Remo.

== Premise ==
A romantic story with an extra dose of comedy. This is a story of a boy who goes to extreme lengths of disguising his gender to win the love of his beloved.

== Cast ==
- Babushaan as Sanju
- Sivani Sangita as Sunayana
- Mihir Das
- Aparajita Mohanty
- Salil Mitra
- Jayprakash Das
- Tribhuban Raj
- Pratyush toltia

== Music ==
The music for the film was composed by Abhijit Majumdar

- Music Director - Abhijit Majumdar
- Lyricist - Nirmal Nayak
- Male Vocals - Tarique Aziz, Rituraj Mohanty
- Female Vocals - Sanju Mohanty, Pragyan

== Soundtrack ==
The soundtrack has music composed by Abhijit Majumdar with lyrics by Nirmal Nayak. The music was released on 12 June 2017.

Sister Sridevi

Soundtrack album by Abhijit Majumdar
- Released: 9 June 2017
- Recorded: 2017
- Genre: Feature film soundtrack
- Language: Odia
- Director: Ashok Pati
- Producer: Tarang Cine Productions

Track list
No.	Title	Music	Singer(s)	Length
1.	"Sister Sridevi (Title Song)"	Abhijit Majumdar	Tarique Aziz
2.	"Mo Chuni Tale black Money"	Abhijit Majumdar	Sanju Mohanty
3.	"Nagin Nagin"	Abhijit Majumdar	Tarique Aziz
4.	"Kain Bhuligalu"	Abhijit Majumdar	Rituraj Mohanty
5.	"Oh Sunayana"	Abhijit Majumdar	Rituraj Mohanty, Pragyan

== Box office ==
The film was released on 9 June 2017 during Raja festival across Odisha to positive reviews. The movie grossed ₹18 Lakh on its first day and collected ₹70 lakh in first week. In the second & third week it grossed respectively ₹1.03 crore & ₹30 Lakh.
