= Tapas Sargharia =

Indian Odia filmmaker

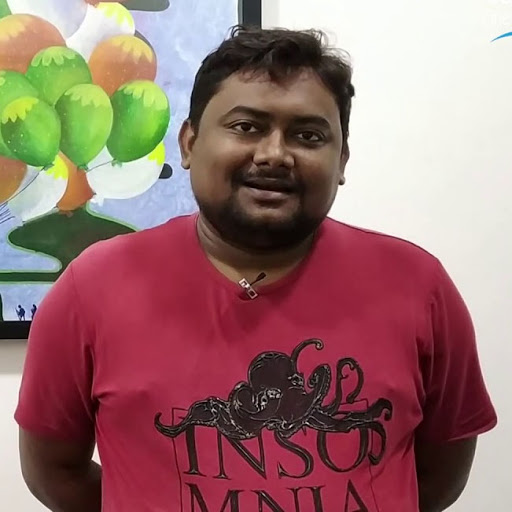
- Occupations: Film director, screenwriter, actor
- Years active: 2007–
- Known for: Filmmaking
- Notable work: Pahili Raja, Ishq Tu Hi Tu, Tu Mo Love Story

Tapas Sargharia an India film director, actor and screenwriter, who works mainly in Ollywood.

== Career ==
Tapas has started his career as an actor in film Pagal Premi in 2007. Then worked as an assistant director in Suna Chadhei Mo Rupa Chadhei in 2009. Tapas Sargharia has directed Odia language films like Chal Tike Dusta Heba, Hero No.1, Tu Mo Love Story and Ishq Tu Hi Tu.

== Filmography ==
| Year | Film | Director | ScreenWriter | Actor | Assistant Director |
|---|---|---|---|---|---|
| 2003 | Rakate Lekhichi Naa | | | | ✓ |
| 2007 | Pagala Premi | | | ✓ | |
| 2010 | Pahili Raja | ✓ | | | |
| 2009 | Suna Chadhei Mo Rupa Chadhei | | | | ✓ |
| 2013 | Rumku Jhumana | ✓ | ✓ | | |
| 2014 | Khusi | ✓ | ✓ | | |
| 2015 | Ishq Tu Hi Tu | ✓ | ✓ | | |
| 2018 | Prem Kumar: Salesman of the year | ✓ | ✓ | | |
| 2019 | Chal Tike Dusta Heba | ✓ | ✓ | | |
| 2020 | Babu Bhaijaan | ✓ | | | |
| 2023 | Love in London | ✓ | | ✓ | |
| 2025 | Charidham - A Journey Within | ✓ | | ✓ | |

== Awards ==
- Won Best Director at 8th Ruchi OFA-2017.
- Won Best story award for film 'Ishq Tu Hi Tu' at 27th State Film Awards in 2015.
