= Elina Samantray =

Indian film actress

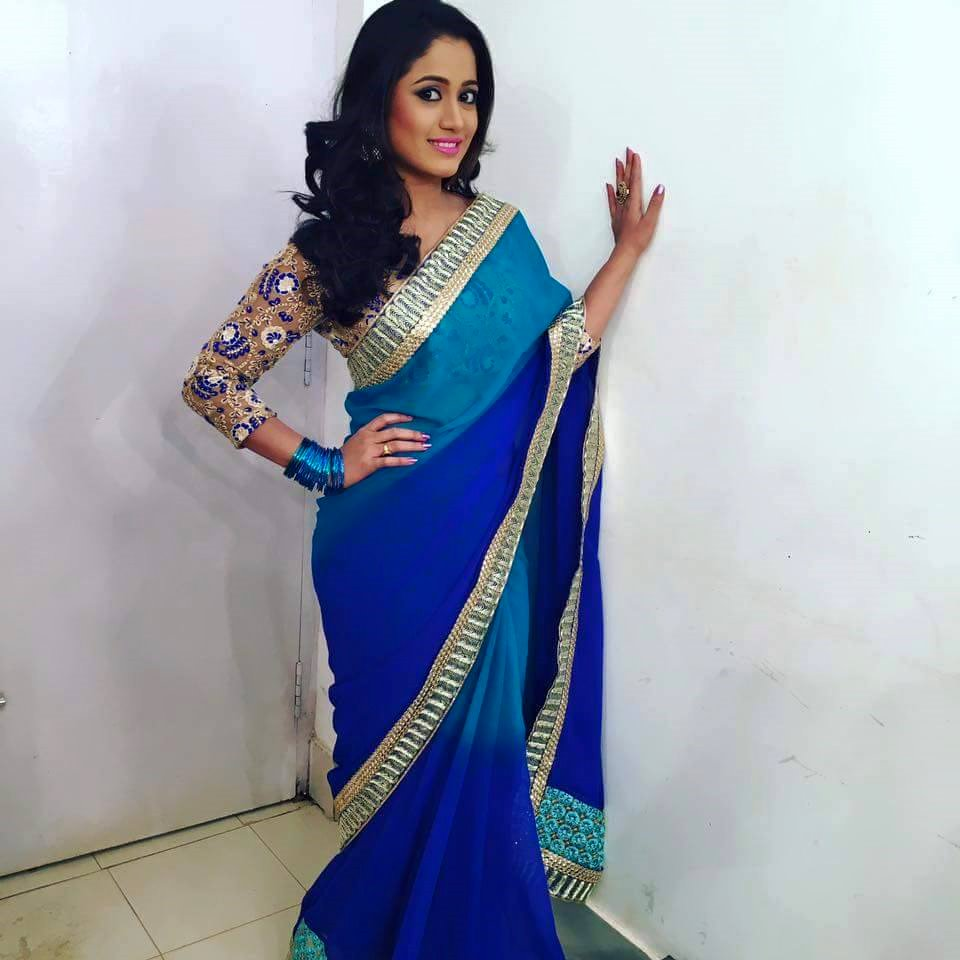
- Born: 23 July 1996 (age 30); Keonjhar, Odisha
- Education: English (Hons)
- Alma mater: Ravenshaw University
- Occupations: Actor; Model
- Years active: 2015–present
- Spouse: Anurag Panda (m.2024)

Ray Elina Samantray, also written as Elina Samantray, is an Indian actress who works in Odia films. She made her career debut with the film Ishq Tu Hi Tu. She was the winner of the first season of the reality television show Kie Heba Mo Heroine, which was broadcast on Tarang TV. She also works in Bengal film industry.

== Career ==
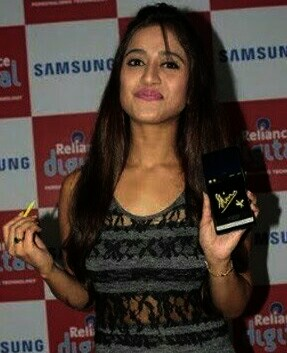

Samantray came to Ollywood industry after winning the reality television show Kie Heba Mo Heroine, which was broadcast on Tarang TV. The first film of her career was Ishq Tu Hi Tu, which is based on the 1991 communal riots of Dhamnagar area of district Bhadrak. Her next two releases were Kehi Nuhe Kahara and Jaga Hatare Pagha. In 2016 she appeared in Love Station alongside Babushan. Later in the same year, she appeared in Jhia Ta Bigidi Gala.

In 2017, she worked with Ollywood actor Anubhav Mohanty in Abhaya and Kabula Barabula. Her next film Happy Lucky with Jyoti Ranjan Nayak, Sambeet Acharya and Sasmita (winner of Kie Heba Mo Heroine Season 3) was released on 14 January 2018. In October 2018, she did a comic role in the film 'Kie heba mo stri' where she was a girl with frequent stomach problems which led to uncontrollable flatulence and diarrhea. She gained wide acclaim for the role.

She appeared in lead role in the film 4 Idiots, along with Sabyasachi Mishra. She is also seen in lead role in the Odia comedy film Tokata Fasigala alongside Sabyasachi Mishra and Papu Pom Pom.

== Filmography ==
Year	Films	Role	Notes
2015	Ishq Tu Hi Tu	Zoya	Debut Film
2015	Kehi Nuhen Kahara		
2015	Jaga Hatare Pagha		
2016	Love Station		
2016	Jhia Ta Bigidi Gala		
2017	Abhaya		
2017	Mu Khanti Odia Jhia		
2017	Kabula Barabula	Saloni	
2018	Happy Lucky		
2018	Tokata Fasigala		
2018	4 Idiots		
2018	Ishq Punithare		
2019	This is Maya re baya		
2019	Maal Mahu Jibana Maati		
2021	Paapa		
2021	Arundhati		
2022	Drustikona		
2023	Pratisodh		
2023	Priye tu mo siye		
2023	Malyagiri	Devi Murmu	Special Appearance on a song
2024	Pabar		
2025	Challenge		
2026	Rakta Golapa		
2026	Shikar		
2026	Danger Devdas		

== Awards ==
Year	Award	Film	Result
2016	7th Tarang Cine Award for Best Debutant Female	Ishq Tu Hi Tu	Nominated
2018	9th Tarang Cine Awards 2018 as Star Performer of the Year 2018	Abhaya	Nominated
