= Aparajita Mohanty =

Indian Odia film actress and politician

- Born: Aparajita Khan; 31 January 1962 (age 64); Karanjia, Mayurbhanj, Orissa, India
- Education: Sambalpur University
- Occupations: Actress; Politician
- Years active: 1980–present
- Political party: Bharatiya Janata Party (2018–present)
- Other political affiliations: Indian National Congress (2014–2018)
- Spouse: Uttam Mohanty (m. 1987–2025)
- Children: Babushaan Mohanty
- Awards: ETV Priya Odia, 2009; Odisha State Film Awards, 1982

Aparajita Mohanty, (born Aparajita Khan; born 31 January 1962) known mononymously as Aparajita, is an Indian actress and politician, who appeared in Odia film industry. She started her career with Sita Labakusha in 1980. Apart from big screen, she played various roles in some Odia television serials.

== Early life and family ==
Mohanty was born at Karanjia, located in Mayurbhanj in Odisha, to Abdul Aziz Khan and Harapriya Ray. Her father was the district magistrate of Karanjia at the time, and she grew up in Sambalpur with her two elder sisters. Her mother was the Zoology professor at Gangadhar Meher University. Her paternal grandfather Maulavi Abdus Sobhan Khan, who originally hailed from Mirzapur, located in Bhadrak, was the Law minister of the Orissa Province from 1941 till 1944 under the premiership of Krushna Chandra Gajapati. Her uncle Rajkishore Ray is a popular literary person in Odisha, whose daughter Mahasweta Ray is her cousin.

She married Odia actor Uttam Mohanty in 1987. Their son Babushan Mohanty is also an actor and singer in the Odia film Industry.

== Acting career ==
Mohanty debuted in Ollywood with along with Uttam Mohanty in 1980. She has appeared in more than 70 Odia films in various characters. Apart from that, she has appeared in various Odia daily television programs.

== Political career ==
In February 2014, Mohanty joined the Indian National Congress. She contested the Cuttack constituency in the 2024 general elections but lost to Bhartruhari Mahtab.

In February 2018, Mohanty joined the Bharatiya Janata Party. She contested the Bhubaneswar North constituency in the 2019 Legislative Assembly elections in Odisha but lost to Susant Kumar Rout.

== Filmography ==
| Denotes films that have not yet been released |

- All films are in Odia unless otherwise noted.

| Year | Film | Role | Notes |
|---|---|---|---|
| 1980 | Sita Laba Kusha | | |
| 1980 | Danda Balunga | | |
| 1982 | Astaraga | | |
| 1982 | Phula Chandana | Phula | |
| 1983 | Jheeati Sita Pari | | |
| 1983 | Bhakta Salabega | | |
| 1983 | Abhilasha | Anuradha | |
| 1983 | Ram Rahim | Anjana | |
| 1984 | Jaaiphula | | |
| 1984 | Janani | | |
| 1985 | Jaga Hatare Pagha | Minu | |
| 1985 | Suhari Bagha | Sunita | |
| 1985 | Mamata Mage Mula | | |
| 1985 | School Master | | |
| 1985 | Sankha Sindura | Lakhsmi | |
| 1985 | Sata Kebe Luchi Rahena | Mita | |
| 1985 | Chaka Bhaunri | Archana | |
| 1985 | Nala Damayanti | | |
| 1985 | Pooja Phula | | |
| 1985 | Sesha Pratikshya | | |
| 1986 | Ei Aama Sansar | | |
| 1986 | Paka Kambal Pot Chhota | Lisa Das | |
| 1986 | Jor Jor Mulak Tar | Rupa | |
| 1987 | Badhu Nirupama | Nirupama Patnaik | |
| 1987 | Chaka Aakhi Sabu Dekhuchi | | |
| 1987 | Micha Mayara Sansar | | |
| 1987 | Eai Ta Dunia | | |
| 1987 | Tunda Baaida | Tulasi | |
| 1988 | Jahaku Rakhibe Ananta | Rupa | |
| 1988 | Bahu Heba Emiti | | |
| 1988 | Papa Punya | | |
| 1988 | Pua Mora Bhola Sankara | | |
| 1988 | Thili Jhia Heli Bahu | | |
| 1989 | Sagar | | |
| 1989 | Rajanigandha | Renu Mahapatra | |
| 1989 | Sastee | | |
| 1989 | Sansar | | |
| 1989 | Bidhira Bidhan | | |
| 1989 | Topaye Sindura Dipata Shankha | | |
| 1989 | Raja Rani | | |
| 1990 | Hasa Luha Bhara Duniya | | |
| 1990 | Chakadola Karuchi Leela | | |
| 1991 | Bastra Haran | Geeta | |
| 1991 | Kapala Likhana | | |
| 1992 | Sukha Sansara | | |
| 1992 | Panjur Bhitare Sari | Bina | |
| 1992 | Maa Jahara Saha | | |
| 1992 | Maa | Chandini | |
| 1992 | Baadshah | | |
| 1992 | Udandi Seeta | | |
| 1993 | Asha | | |
| 1993 | Pathara Khasuchi Bada Deulu | | |
| 1993 | Sukher Swarga | | |
| 1994 | Gadhi Janile Ghara Sundara | Tulsi Mahapatra | |
| 1994 | Aemiti Bhai Jagate Nahin | | |
| 1994 | Salma Sundari | | |
| 1994 | Gopa Re Badhhuchhi Kala Kanhei | | |
| 1994 | Rakhile Siba Mariba Kie | Arati Samantrai | |
| 1994 | Akuha Katha | | |
| 1994 | Sakhi Rahila Ae Singha Duara | Urmila | |
| 1994 | Mukti Mashal | | |
| 1995 | Mo Bhai Jaga | | |
| 1995 | Subhadra | Subhadra Patnaik | |
| 1995 | Mo Mana Khali Tumari Pain | Lakhua's wife | |
| 1995 | Rakata Kahiba Kie Kahara | Anita | |
| 1996 | Suna Pua | | |
| 1996 | Yashoda | Joshada | |
| 1996 | Laxman Rekha | Rekha | |
| 1996 | Sakhi Rakhiba Mo Shankha Sindura | Sita | |
| 1997 | Jibana sathi | Gita Das | |
| 1997 | Sunya Swarupa | | |
| 1997 | Lakhe Siba Puji Paichi Pua | | |
| 1997 | Suna Sansar | | |
| 1997 | Kanha | | |
| 1998 | Moner Moto Mon | | |
| 1999 | Rakata Chinhichhi Nijara Kie | Sabitri | |
| 1999 | Katha Kahiba Mo Matha Sindoor | Gauri | |
| 1999 | Pua Bhangi Dela Suna Sansara | | |
| 1999 | Maa Pari Kie Heba | | |
| 1999 | Rakhi Bhijigala Aakhi Luha Re | | |
| 1999 | Dharma Nikiti | Ganga Patnaik | |
| 1999 | Satyam Shivam Sundaram | | |
| 2000 | Tulashi | | |
| 2001 | Kala Manika | Uma | |
| 2002 | Pua Mora Jagata Jita | Joshada Sundarrai | |
| 2002 | Samaya Chakare Sansara Ratha | Kalpana Rautrai | |
| 2002 | Dharma Sahile Hela | Ms. Chowdhury | |
| 2002 | Samay Kheluchhi Chaka Bhaunri | | |
| 2003 | Pari Mahal | | |
| 2003 | Vidhata | Shanti Patnaik | |
| 2003 | Sata Michha | | |
| 2003 | Nari Akhire Nian | | |
| 2005 | Topae Sindura Di Topa Luha | Mrs. Naratom | |
| 2005 | Jiwan Mrutyu | Debu's Mother | |
| 2005 | Shatrur Santan | | |
| 2006 | Prema Rutu Aslilare | | |
| 2006 | I Love My India | | |
| 2006 | Shaashu Ghara Chaalijibi | Parbati Rai | |
| 2006 | Tu Eka Aama Saha Bharasa | | |
| 2007 | Dhauli Express | | |
| 2007 | To Pain Nebi Mu Sahe Janama | Rebati Patnaik | |
| 2007 | Samaya Hathare Dori | | |
| 2007 | Pheria Mo Suna Bhauni | | |
| 2008 | Dhanare Rakhibu Sapatha Mora | Ganga | |
| 2008 | Hasiba Puni Mo Suna Sansar | Jaya | |
| 2008 | Bhagya Chakra | | |
| 2009 | Dream Girl | | |
| 2009 | Aila Re Oriya Pua | | |
| 2009 | Romeo: The Lover Boy | Sandhya Choudhury | |
| 2009 | Abhimanyu | Subhalata Samant | |
| 2009 | Tume Hi Sathi Mora | | |
| 2009 | Aa Janhare Lekhiba Naa | | |
| 2009 | Bagher Bachcha | | |
| 2010 | Pagala Karichi Paunji Tora | | |
| 2010 | Subha Vivaha | | |
| 2010 | To Akhire Mun | | |
| 2010 | Bhul Bujhibani Mate | Ashish's mother | |
| 2010 | Swayamsiddha | | |
| 2010 | Tate Bhala Pauchi Boli | | |
| 2011 | Chocolate | Baunty's mother | |
| 2011 | Mate Bohu Kari Nei Ja | Ritesh's mother | |
| 2011 | E Mana Khoje Mana Tiye | Mayuri | |
| 2011 | Tu Mo Girlfriend | Bunty's mother | |
| 2011 | Loafer | Niharika's sister in law | |
| 2012 | Chanda Na Tame Tara | | |
| 2012 | Emiti Bi Prema Hue | | |
| 2012 | Thukool | Rani Maa | |
| 2012 | Emiti Bi Prema Hue | Suchitra | |
| 2012 | Love Master | Aparna | |
| 2012 | Bad Girl - Gote Badnam Jhiara Katha | Suman Choudhury | |
| 2013 | Daha Balunga | | |
| 2013 | Target | | |
| 2013 | Nai Separi Kanaka Gori | Lakshmi | |
| 2013 | Prema Sabuthu Balaban | | |
| 2014 | Golapi Golapi | Shweta's mother | |
| 2014 | Akhire Akhire | Shiva's mother | |
| 2014 | Daddy: The Loving God | | |
| 2014 | Tu Aau Mu | | |
| | Shabnam | Bangladeshi Movie | |
| 2015 | Ishq Tu Hi Tu | | |
| 2015 | Super Michhua | | |
| 2015 | Lekhu Lekhu Lekhi Deli | | |
| 2015 | Ishq Tu Hi Tu | Rita Dsouza | |
| 2015 | Nua Nua Premare | Advocate Sandhya Samantrai | |
| 2015 | Kie Daba Takkar | Uma | |
| 2015 | Super Michhua | Romeo's mother | |
| 2015 | Mo Dil Kahe Ilu Ilu | | |
| 2015 | Maya | | |
| 2016 | Sweet Heart | | |
| 2016 | Jabardast Premika | | |
| 2017 | Sister Sridevi | | |
| 2017 | Siva Not Out | | |
| 2018 | Sriman Surdas | | |
| 2018 | Local Toka Love Chokha | | |
| 2019 | Ajab Sanju Ra Gajab Love | | |
| 2019 | Nayaka Ra Na Devdas | | |
| 2024 | Pabar | | Cameo Appearance |
| 2025 | Bou Buttu Bhuta | Rathnamala | |

== Awards ==
- 2006: ETV Priya Odia
- 1989: Best Actress Odisha State Film Awards (Sastee)
- 1988: Best Actress Odisha State Film Awards (Jahaku Rakhibe Ananta)
- 1987: Best Actress Odisha State Film Awards (Tunda Baaida)
- 1982: Best Actress Odisha State Film Awards (Phula Chandan)
- 1993: Best Actress Odisha State Film Awards (Asha)
