= Mihir Das =

Indian actor (1965–2022)

Mihir Kumar Das
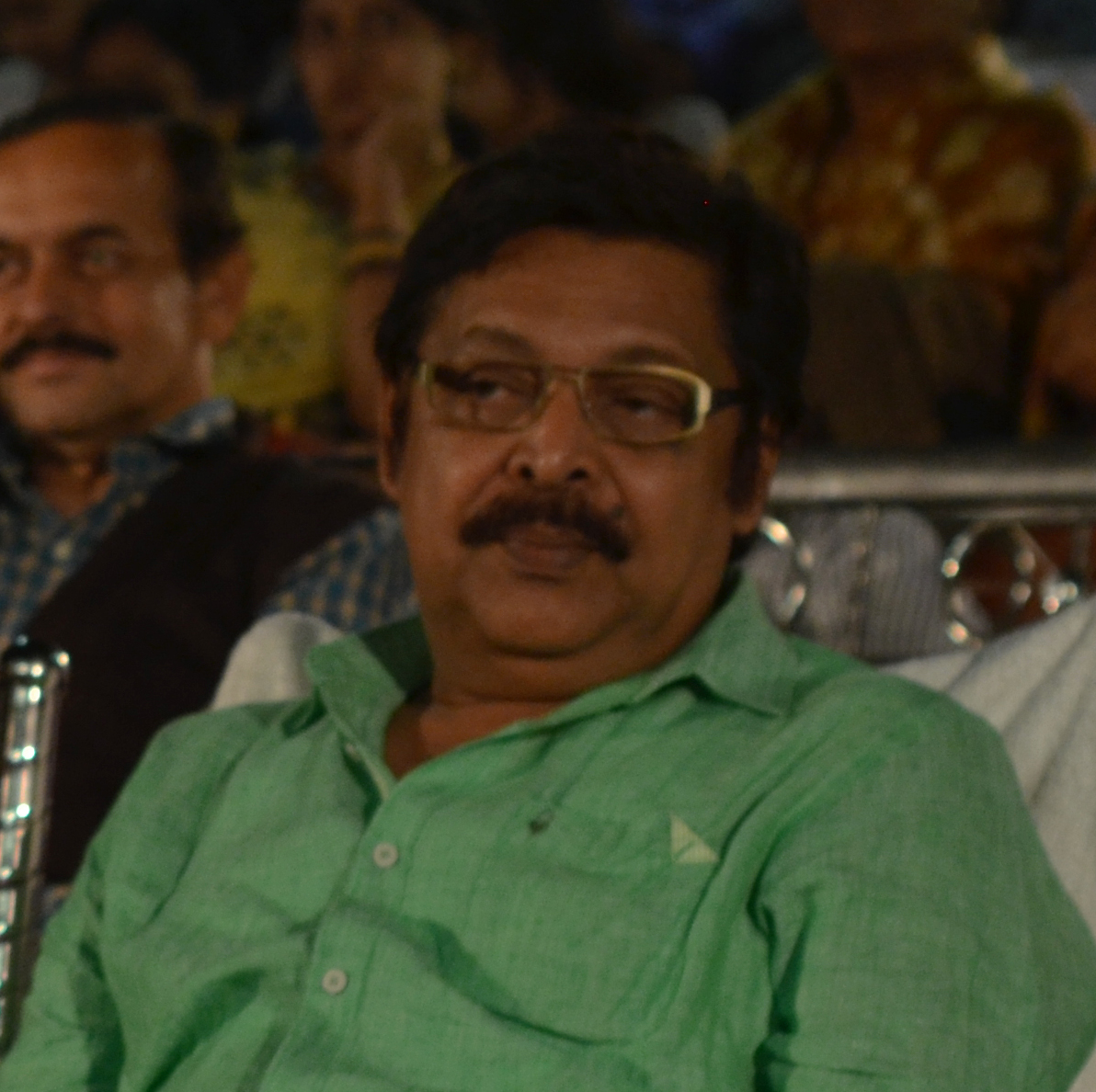
- Das during the 25th Odisha State Film Awards 2014
- Born: 11 February 1959; Baripada, Mayurbhanj, Odisha, India
- Died: 11 January 2022 (aged 62); Cuttack, Odisha, India
- Occupations: Actor, model
- Spouse: Sangita Das(Died 2010)
- Children: Amlan Das, Aklant Das

Signature
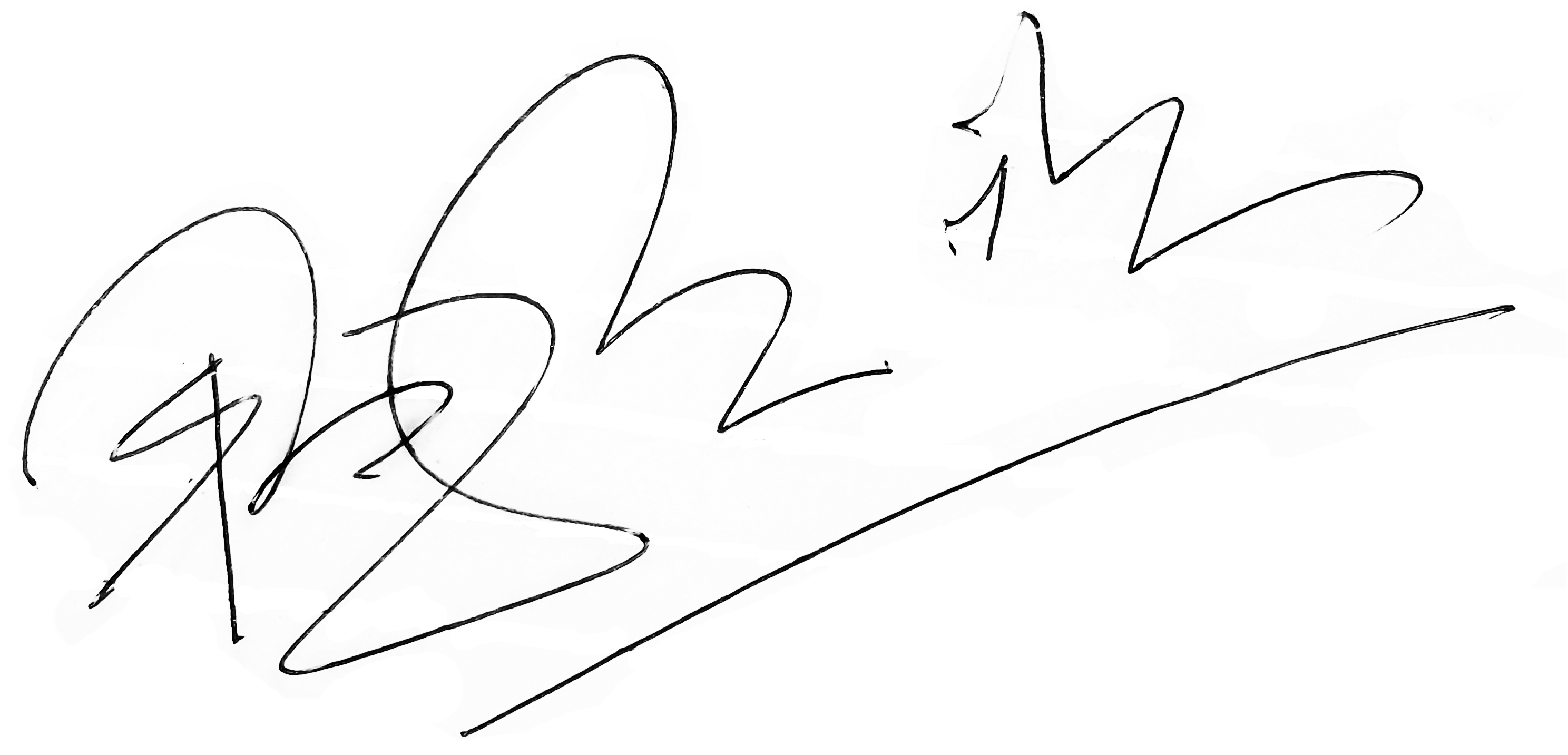

Mihir Kumar Das (11 February 1959 – 11 January 2022) was an Indian actor who worked in Odia language films of Ollywood industry. He received several awards, notably Best Actor for his films Laxmi Pratima in 1998, Pheria Mo Suna Bhauni in 2005 Best Supporting Actor award for his films Rakhi Bandhili Mo Rakhiba Mana in 2002 and Prema Adhei Akhyara and Best Comedian award for Mu Tate Love Karuchhi in 2007 from the Odisha state government.

== Life and career ==
Mihir Kumar Das was born in Mayurbhanj on 11 February 1959. He was married to singer and film artist Sangita Das, who died in 2010 due to a heart attack. She was the daughter of the popular singer, Chitta Jena. Mihir Das and Sangita Das have two sons, the elder, Amlan Das who is also an actor and Aklant Das. He debuted in the Odia film industry with an art film School Master and then in commercial (non-art) film Mathura Bijay in 1979. He received wider applause and recognition for his performance in Pua Mora Bhola Sankara. A veteran actor for more than three decades, he received Best Actor award from the state government for his performance in movies Laxmi Protima in 1998 and Pheria Mo Suna Bhauni in 2005 and Best Comedian award for Mu Tate Love Karuchhi in 2007.

== Death ==
In December 2021, Das was hospitalized after having a heart attack while undergoing dialysis for a renal issue in Cuttack, India. He died while undergoing treatment at hospital in Cuttack on 11 January 2022, at the age of 62.

== Filmography ==
Year	Film
2022	Bhija Matira Swarga
2022	Gupchup
2022	Dil Mora Manena
2022	Biswanath
2022	Prasthanam
2021	Gaon Ra Na Galuapur
2021	72 Hours - Life or Death
2021	Tume Mo Sankha Tume Mo Sindura
2021	Tandav
2021	Roll No - 27 Sujata Senapati
2020	Babu Bhaijaan
2020	Mu Paradesi Chadhei
2019	Khusi
2019	Mr.Majnu
2019	Chabiraani
2018	Only Pyaar
2018	Happy Lucky
2018	Poglu (also known as Paglu)
2018	Sundergarh Ra Salman Khan
2018	Sriman Surdas
2017	Tu Mo Love Story
2017	Sister Sridevi
2017	Abhay
2017	Hero No. 1
2017	Romeo Juliet
2016	Agastya
2016	Love Station
2016	Love Pain Kuch Bhi Karega
2014	Pagala Karichu Tu
2013	Target
2013	My Love Story
2013	ACP Sagarika
2013	Deewana Deewani
2013	Rumku Jhumana
2013	Mu Eka Tumara
2013	Tu Mo Dehara Chhai
2012	Love Master
2012	Mnu
2012	Chanda Na Tume Tara
2012	Bad Girl
2012	Idiot
2012	Raja Jhia Sange Heigala Bhaba
2012	Tu Mo Arambha Tu Mo Shessa
2012	Gud Boy
2012	Shapath
2012	Emiti Bi Prema Hue
2011	Aain Kanoon
2011	Katak - The Silver City
2011	Criminal
2011	Kemiti a Bandhan
2011	Loafer
2011	Mu Premi Mu Pagala
2011	Chocolate
2011	Chori Chori Mana Chori
2011	143 I Love You
2011	Baishi Pahache Kheliba Mina
2011	Hero - Prem Katha
2010	Tu Tha Mun Jauchi Rushi
2010	Asibu Kebe Saji Mo Rani
2010	Diwana
2010	Prema Adhei Akshyara
2010	Tate Bhala Pauchi Boli
2010	Tora More Jodi Sundara
2010	Bhul Bujhibani Mate
2010	Pahili Raja
2010	Sanju Aau Sanjana
2010	Aalo Mora Kandhei
2009	Tume Hi Sathi Mora
2009	Abhimanyu
2009	Sata Sure Bandha E Jibana
2009	Aaa Re Saathi Aa
2009	Keun Dunia Ru Asila Bandhu
2009	Aila Re Odia Pua
2009	Shatru Sanghar
2009	Dream Girl
2009	Suna Chadhei Mo Rupa Chadhei
2009	Priya -The dream Girl
2009	Aaa Re Saathi Aa
2008	Munna-A Love Story
2008	Mu Sapanara Soudagar
2008	Mate Ta Love Helare
2008	Hasiba Puni Mo Suna Sansar
2008	Mate Ani Dela Lakhye Faguna
2008	To Bina Bhala Lagena
2007	Agnisikha
2007	Chaka Chaka Bhaunri
2007	Dhauli Express
2007	E Mana Manena
2007	Mu Tate Love Karuchi
2007	Pheria Mo Suna Bhauni
2007	Samaya Hathare Dori
2006	Rakhi Bandhili Mo Rakhiba Mana
2006	Shaashu Ghara Chaalijibi
2006	Thank You Bhagban
2006	Tu Eka Aama Saha Bharasa
2005	Jiwan Mrutyu
2005	Topae Sindura Di Topa Luha
2003	Matrushakti
2002	Samay Kheluchhi Chaka Bhaunri
2001	Baazi
2001	Dharma Debata
2000	Hari Bhai Harena
2000	Prem Bandhan
2000	Rashmi Rekha
2000	Samaya Chakare Sansara Ratha
2000	Sola Shukrabaar
1999	Gopa Re Badhhuchhi Kala Kanhei
1999	Katha Kahiba Mo Matha Sindoor
1999	Krishna Kaberi
1999	Maa Pari Kie Heba
1999	Rakhi Bhijigala Aakhi Luha Re
1999	Laxmi Protima(Bengali)
1998	Ahalya
1998	Laxmi Ra Abhisara
1998	Pabitra Bandhan
1998	Sahara Jaluchi
1998	Soubhagyabati
1998	Bou
1998	Stree
1997	Bhula Kahar
1997	Ganga Jamuna
1996	Suhaga Sindura
1996	Pua Mora Bhola Sankara
1996	Jibana Dhara
1994	Bhai Hela Bhagari
1994	Gadhi Janile Ghara Sundara
1994	Mahua
1994	Mukti Mashal
1993	Anupama
1993	Bhagya Hate Doro
1993	Dadagiri
1993	Shardhanjali
1992	Agni Sankat
1992	Ghara Mora Swarga
1992	Preeti Ra Eti
1991	Ki Heba Sua Posile
1990	Hasa Luha Bhara Duniya
1990	Hisab Kariba Kalia
1990	Kalia Bharasa
1990	Paradeshi Chadhei
1989	Pratisodha Aparadh Nuhen
1989	Sagar
1988	Kanyadaan
1987	Akashara Aakhi
1987	Eai Ta Dunia
1986	Ei Aama Sansar
1986	School Master
1980	Ramayan
1979	Mathura Bijaya

== Film awards ==
- Best Actor award for Pua Mora Bhola Sankara in 1996.
- Best Supporting Actor award for Soubhagyabati in 1997.
- Best Supporting Actor award for Laxmi Protima in 1998.
- Best Actor award for Bidhata in 1999.
- Best Supporting Actor award for Rakhi Bandhili Mo Rakhiba Mana in 2002.
- Best Actor award for Pheria Mo Suna Bhauni in 2005.
- Best Comedian award for Mu Tate Love Karuchi in 2007.
- Best Supporting Actor award for Prema Adhei Akhyara in 2010.

== See also ==
- Orissa State Film Awards
