= Ashok Pati =

Indian film director and screenwriter

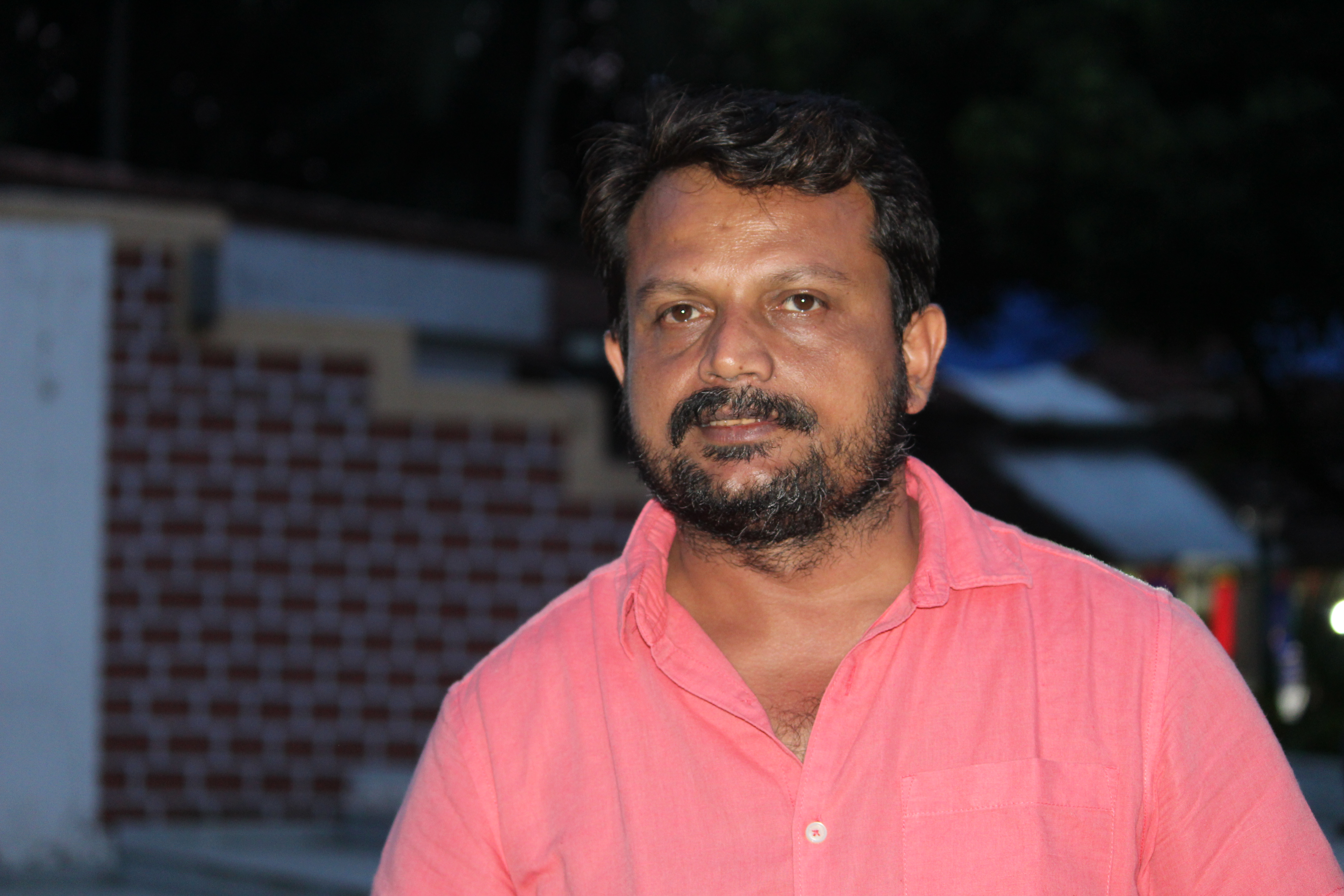
- Pati in 2018
- Born: Ashok Kumar Pati; 2 July 1976 (age 49); Bhubaneswar, Odisha, India
- Occupations: Film director Screenplay/story writer Actor
- Known for: Loafer; Nandini I Love U Baazi
- Pati's voice Recorded August 2018

Ashok Pati is an Indian Odia screenplay, story writer, actor and director. He is also associated with Bengali and Bangladesh films as a director.

== Filmography ==
Assistant director (Odia)

- Rakhi Bhijigala Akhi Luhare
- Suna Palinki
- Laxmi Pratima
- Kie Pochhi Daba Maa Akhira Luha
- Sahara Jaluchhi
- Mana Rahigala Tumari Thare

Assistant director (Hindi)

- Dhai Akshar prem ki
- Chori Chori
- Deewaar: Let's Bring Our Heroes Home
- Taxi no 9211
- Shohorat TV serial ( DD – 1 )

=== Director ===
| Denotes films that have not yet been released |

| Year | Film | Language | Notes | Ref. |
|---|---|---|---|---|
| 2001 | Baazi | Odia | | |
| 2007 | To Paeen | Odia | | |
| 2008 | Mate Ta Love Helare | Odia | | |
| 2008 | Nandini I Love U | Odia | | |
| 2008 | Prem Rogi | Odia | | |
| 2009 | Dream Girl | Odia | | |
| 2010 | Sanju Aau Sanjana | Odia | | |
| 2010 | Diwana | Odia | | |
| 2011 | Loafer | Odia | | |
| 2011 | 143 – I Love You | Odia | | |
| 2011 | Dosti | Odia | | |
| 2012 | Shapath | Odia | | |
| 2012 | Idiot: I Do Ishq Only Tumse | Odia | | |
| 2013 | Deewana Deewani | Odia | | |
| 2013 | Khiladi | Bengali | | |
| 2014 | Ami Shudhu Cheyechi Tomay | Bengali | Indo-Bangladesh joint production | |
| 2015 | Romeo vs Juliet | Bengali | Indo-Bangladesh joint production | |
| 2015 | Super Michhua | Odia | | |
| 2015 | Aashiqui | Bengali | Indo-Bangladesh joint production | |
| 2016 | Tu Je Sei | Odia | | |
| 2016 | Love Station | Odia | | |
| 2016 | Love Pain Kuch Bhi Karega | Odia | | |
| 2017 | Sister Sridevi | Odia | | |
| 2018 | Inspector Notty K | Bengali | Indo-Bangladesh joint production | |
| 2018 | Sundergarh Ra Salman Khan | Odia | | |
| 2018 | Sriman Surdas | Odia | | |
| 2019 | Ajab Sanju Ra Gajab Love | Odia | | |
| 2019 | Golmaal Love | Odia | | |
| 2019 | Mr. Majnu | Odia | | |
| 2020 | Lucky Ra Lockdown Love Story | Odia | | |
| 2021 | Paapa | Odia | | |
| 2021 | Roll No 27 Sujata Senapati | Odia | | |
| 2021 | Lali haba kahara | Odia | | |
| 2023 | Guddu Gangster | Odia | | |
| 2023 | R.A.M | Odia | | |
| 2024 | Pabar | Odia | | |
| 2025 | Ladhei- Fight till death | Odia | | |

Television

- Shohrat .. Hindi .. DD1
- Sanskara .. Odia .. ETv odia
- Sihaga Sindura.. odia .. Star Kiran, odia

=== Screenplay/Story ===
- Baazi (2005)
- Mu Tate Love Karuchi (2007)
- Mate Ta Love Helare (2008)
- Nandini I Love U (2008)
- Prem Rogi (2009)
- Dream Girl (2009)
- Sanju Aau Sanjana (2010)
- Diwana (2010)
- Loafer (2011)
- 143 – I Love You (2011)
- Dosti (2011)
- Shapath (2012)
- Idiot: I Do Ishq Only Tumse (2012)
- Deewana Deewani (2013)

=== Actor ===
- Prema Adhei Akshyara (2010)
- Idiot: I Do Ishq Only Tumse (2012)
- Luchakali (2012)

== Controversies ==
In 2021, Pati and Zee Sarthak Films Pvt. Ltd. were accused of remaking Helen into Odia, without buying rights from the original creators due to which Boney Kapoor's Production house sued them and the telecast of "Monalisa" (the Odia remake) was cancelled on Zee Sarthak TV.
