= Babushaan Mohanty =

Indian actor and Playback singer

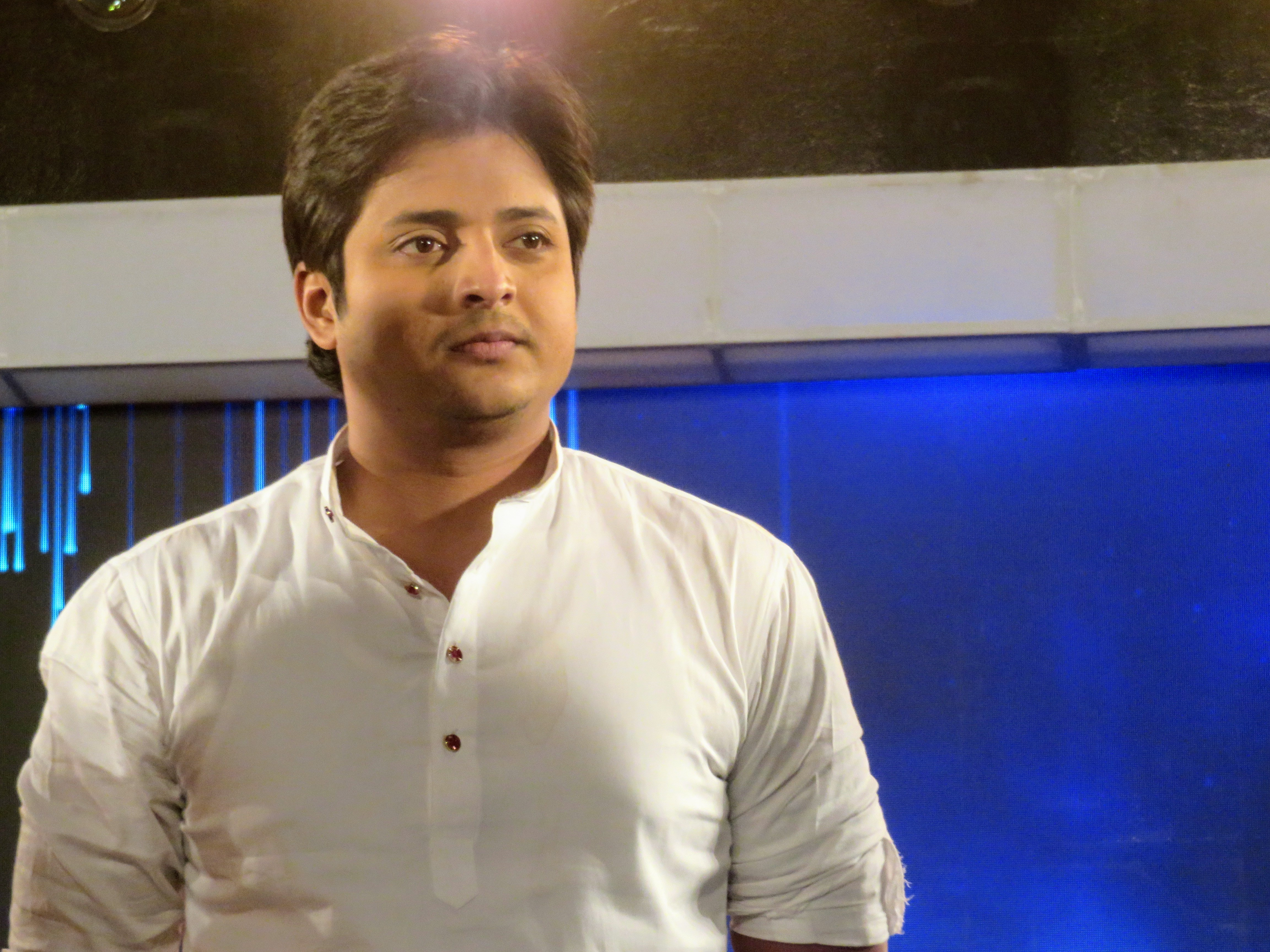
- Born: Tanmay Mohanty; 30 July 1989 (age 37); Bhubaneswar, Odisha
- Occupations: Actor; playback singer; musical artist
- Years active: 2009–present
- Spouse: Tripti Satpathy
- Parent(s): Uttam Mohanty (father); Aparajita Mohanty (mother)

Tanmay Mohanty (born 30 July 1989), professionally known as Babushaan Mohanty, is an Indian actor and playback singer who predominantly works in Odia cinema. He is known for his performance in Odia movies like Super Michhua, Sister Sridevi, DAMaN and Bou Buttu Bhuta.

== Early life ==
Babushaan was born as Tanmay Mohanty on 30 July 1989 in Bhubaneswar in a Karan family, to actors Uttam Mohanty and Aparajita Mohanty.

== Career ==
Babushaan Mohanty debuted in the Odia film industry in 2009 through Romeo - The Lover Boy directed by Hara Patnaik opposite actress Lovely. His parents played his father and mother in the movie.

In 2015, he starred in the successful films Jie Jaha Kahu Mora Dho, Super Michhua and Bhala Pae Tate 100 Ru 100.

In 2022, he played the role of a doctor in the movie DAMaN. In the same year, Bidyarana released in theaters during Ratha Jatra, in which he shared the screen with Sivani Sangita, Soma Bhoumick, Pupul Bhuyan.

=== Production company ===
Mohanty started his production company Babushaan Films in 2017. Sunapila Tike Screw Dhila was the first movie made by this production with Prakash & Dhiraj Entertainment.In 2023, he co-produced Phalguna Chaitra with Aadya Jagdev Films and Malyagiri with Rain Drop Pictures. In 2024, he produced Pabar under Babushaan Films.

== Controversy ==
Mohanty was involved in a public controversy in July 2022 surrounding allegations of an extramarital affair with actress Prakruti Mishra. On July 23, 2022, Mohanty's wife, Trupti Satapathy, intercepted his car in Bhubaneswar, where he was traveling with Mishra. His wife publicly confronted both Babushaan and Prakruti, accusing them of having a two-year extramarital affair. Satapathy lodged a case against Mohanty under sections 498A husband or his relative subjecting wife to cruelty and 506 criminal intimidation of the Indian Penal Code. Mishra's mother filed a complaint under IPC sections 341, wrongful restraint), 323 voluntarily causing hurt 506 criminal intimidation, and others.

== Filmography ==
=== Films ===
Year	Title	Role	Notes	Ref.
2009	Romeo – The Lover Boy	Romeo	Debut film	
2010	To Akhire Mu	Surya / Prakash		
2010	Sanju Aau Sanjana	Sanju		
2010	Prema Adhei Akhyara	Amar	Won–Odisha State Film Award for Best Actor; Won–Odisha State Film Award for Best Singer	
2010	Love Connection	Jeet	Debut Bengali film	
2011	Loafer	Sanju		
2011	Ghayal Yodha	Arjun	Debut Bhojpuri film	
2011	143 I Love You	Sanjay		
2011	Chocolate	Bonty		
2011	Dosti	Akash		
2012	Thukul	Pancham		
2012	Luchakali	Tanmay Mohanty		
2012	Idiot: I Do Ishq Only Tumse	Sanjay		
2012	Love Master	Jeet	Won - Odisha State Film Award for Best Singer	
2013	Deewana Deewani	Sanjay		
2013	Daha Balunga	Omkar Mohanty		
2014	Akhire Akhire	Rahul		
2014	Lekhu Lekhu Lekhi Deli	Sidharth		
2015	Jie Jaha Kahu Mora Dho	Raja		
2015	Super Michhua	Romeo		
2015	Bhala Pae Tate 100 Ru 100	Rahul		
2016	Tu Je Sei	Rohan		
2016	Jabardast Premika	Chandu		
2016	Love Station	Sanju / Sanjay Satapathy		
2016	Jhia Ta Bigidi Gala		Extended Cameo	
2016	Sweet Heart	Shiba		
2016	Love Pain Kuch Bhi Karega	Sanju		
2017	Dil Diwana Heigala	Dipu		
2017	Sister Sridevi	Sanjay "Sanju" / Sister Sridevi		
2017	Suna Pila Tike Screw Dhila	Kunja		
2017	Hero No.1	Sanju		
2018	Only Pyaar			
2018	Sundargarh Ra Salman Khan	Salman Khan		
2018	Local Toka Love Chokha	Radhe		
2018	Sriman Surdas	Sriman Surdas		
2019	Ajab Sanju Ra Gajab Love	Sanju		
2019	Golmaal Love	Sanju		
2019	Mr. Majnu	Sanju		
2022	Premam	Sanju		
2022	Bidyarana	Mahi		
2022	DAMaN	Dr. Siddharth Mohanty	Won- Odisha State Film Award for Best Actor	
2023	Malyagiri	Parshu		
2024	Pabar	Benudhar Kandi / Benta	Won- Odisha State Film Award for Best Actor	
2025	Bou Buttu Bhuta	Buttu		
2025	Lahari	Naba	Cameo appearance	
2026	Antaryami: Karma Awaits You		Telugu Debut	
2027	NAVRUP			

=== Discography ===
Year	Film	Song
2009	Romeo – The Lover Boy	"Mu Romeo The Lover Boy"
2009	Romeo – The Lover Boy	"Jeun Dina Priyaku Mun"
2009	Romeo – The Lover Boy	"Mu Naach Kahile"
2010	To Akhire Mu	"Priya Mora Chaali Jaaye"
2010	Prema Adhei Akhyara	"Dura Akasha ra Janha Tie"
2010	Prema Adhei Akhyara	"Megharu Tu Jharilu Na"
2011	Loafer	"Paaichi Bhala Tate Mu"
2011	143 I Love You	"143 I Love You"
2011	143 I Love You	"Keun Sahararu Asichi A Pari"
2011	143 I Love You	"Prema Harena Prema Marena"
2011	Chocolate	"Dhire Dhire Chal re Samayay"
2011	Chocolate	"Gol Janha"
2012	Luchakali	"Luha Sathe Bandhana"
2012	Luchakali	Akasharu Kichhi Megha Ani
2012	Idiot: I Do Ishq Only Tumse	"Dheema Dheema Chatira Spandana"
2012	Love Master	"Ga Ma Ga Re Sa"
2013	Daha Balunga	"Maula Maula"
2014	Lekhu Lekhu Lekhi Deli	"Hrudaya Bichara"
2015	Jie Jaha Kahu Mora Dho	"To Pain Dhak Dhak Dil Hela Re"
2015	Super Michhua	"Sunyata Ku Pachare Jebe"
2015	Bhala Pae Tate 100 ru 100	"Ei Achhu Mayabini"
2015	Bhala Pae Tate 100 ru 100	"Ete Megha Thai"
2016	Jabardast Premika	"Abhimanini"
2016	Love Station	"Ore Sawariya"
2017	Dil Dewana Heigala	"Tu Mo Saregama"
2017	Suna Pila Tike Screw Dhila	"Rabba Rabba"
2017	Suna Pila Tike Screw Dhila	"Aa Thoo"
2017	Hero No. 1	"Jibanata Dhuan Dhuan"
2018	Only Pyaar	"Its Only Pyaar"
2018	Local Toka Love Chokha	"Akhi Maage Manjuri"
2019	Ajab Sanju Ra Gajab Love	"Mushkil Hai Jeena"
2022	Premam	Mo Dina Raatire
2022	Bidya Rana	Bhabana E Nua Premara
2022	Bidya Rana	Aasichi Mu Eka
2022	Daman	Nichhatiya Mana
2023	Malyagiri	Chahala
2024	Dasama	Smruti Pakhi
2024	Pabar	Nali Saadhi
2025	Bou Buttu Bhuta	Oda Lage

==== Non-film songs ====
Year	Song	Note
2020	"Aji Mu Peeni"	Lyrics by Arun Mantri
2021	"Tume Uchula Nadira Janha"	Lyrics by Aparajita Mohanty
2022	"Dho Re Baya Dho"	Lyrics by Aparajita Mohanty
2023	"Dhire Dhire Chal Re Samaya"	Lyrics by Bapu Goswami
