= List of Odia films of 2012 =

This is a list of films produced by the Ollywood film industry based in Bhubaneshwar and Cuttack in 2012:

== A-Z ==
Title	Director	Cast	Genre	Release date	Notes
2012
ACP Ranvbir	Sudhakar Basant	Anubhav Mohanty, Pradeep Rawat	Action, Drama	19 Oct 2012	Producer - Bishnupriya Arts & Graphics (Anupras Mohanty, Anubhav Mohanty)
Bad Girl	Jay Prakash Mohanty	Lipi, Gourav Kumar	Action, Drama	7 Sep 2012	Producer Anjaneya Media P Ltd. (Prabhat Ku. Pradhan)
Chanda Naa Tame Tara	Ramesh Rout	Deepak Kumar, Prachi (Mumbai)	Romance	28 Sep 2012	Producer D.S.O. Movies (Chittranjan Prusty)
Emiti Bi Prema Hue	Nishikant Dalabehera	Mihir Das, Riya Dey, Hadu	Action, romance	10 February 2012	Shiny Creations
Gud Boy	Jyoti Das	Arindam, Priya, Ipsita	Action, drama	10 May 2012	Producer -Reena Samal, Hrudananda Samal
He Sakha	Asish Bhattacharya	Ashok Bal, Gargi Mohanty, Kabula Mohanty	Fantasy	1 January 2012	Modern Music (Sangram Gajendra)
Idiot	Ashok Pati	Babushaan Mohanty, Riya Dey, Mihir Das	Drama, Romance	12 June 2012	Sunil Kumar Panda
Jaggu Autowala	James Anthony	Pupinder, Pamela	Action, Drama, Romance	7 Dec 2012	Producer - Kalosthenik Entertainment (Pupinder)
Kebe Tume Nahan Kebe Mu Nahin	Chakradhar Sahu	Sabyasachi Misra, Archita Sahu, Ajit Das	Action, family, romance	17 February 2012	Silver Screen Productions
Love Master	Himanshu (Chandi) Parija	Babushaan Mohanty, Riya Dey, Poonam,Mihir Das,Pintu Nanda, Uttam Mohanty, Aparajita Mohanty	Drama, Romance	19 Oct 2012	Remake of Telugu film Brindavanam
Luchakali	Susant Mani	Babushaan Mohanty, Sriya, Samaresh Routray & Megha,Bijay Mohanty	Action, drama	30 March 2012	Chakadola Productions
Matira Bandhana	Himansu Khatua	Mihir Das	Drama		
Omm Sai Ram	Hara Pattnaik	Sabyasachi Mishra, Budhaditya, Manas, Prakruti, Koel, Moushumi	Action, drama	14 Sep 2012	Producer Susant Ku. Rath
Parshuram	Sudhansu Sahoo	Arindam, Barsha	Action, Drama, Romance	21 Oct 2012	Remake of Tamil film Rowthiram Associate Director : Tripati Kumar Sahu
Shapath	Ashok Pati	Akash, Archita Sahu, Mihir Das	Action	13 April 2012	Magnum Media Pvt. Ltd.
Raja Jhia Sathe Heigala Bhaba	Sudhansu Sahoo	Archita Arindam, Mihir Mahasweta Ray	Romance, drama	10 June 2012	Producer Sarthak Films Associate Director : Tripati Kumar Sahu
Raju Awara	Debanand Nayak	Houdhury Jayaprakash Das, Namrta Das	Drama	2 March 2012	Abhaya Jyoti Productions
Rangeela Toka		Papu, Devjaani	Comedy, Drama	27 July 2012	Producer Oscar Movies (Prabhas Rout)
Something Something	Sudhakar Vasant	Anubhav, Barsha Priyadarshini, Harihara Mahapatra	Romance	8 January 2012	Vishnupriyaa Art & Graphics
Thukul	Prashant Nanda	Babushaan Mohanty, Archita Sahu, Sritam Das, Aparajita Mohanty,Prakruti Mishra	Romance	12 January 2012	Mitra Creative Arts
