= ETV Odia Film Awards =

- Awarded for: Best in Oriya film
- Country: India
- Presented by: ETV
- First award: 2010

The ETV Odia Film Awards started in the year 2010 to honor Odisha film artists & technician. Awards have been instituted in 14 categories that include the best film, best director, best actor, best actress, best supporting actor, best supporting actress, best villain, best play back singers (male and female separately), best music composer, best comedian, best child artist and best debut actors (both male and female), Lifetime Achievement Award have conferred on a prominent and pioneering personality of the Odia film industry for significant contribution to cinema.

== 2nd ETV Odia Film Awards 2011 ==
Best Film	Best Director
Swayamsiddha - Prabhat Ranjan Mallik; Tu Thile Mo Dara Kahaku - Ajit Misra, Somya Ranjan Patnaik; To Akhire Mu - Prabhas Rout; Aa Lo Mora Kandha - Manas Sahu; Diwana - Bijoy Kandoi,	Sudhanshu Sahu - Swayamsiddha; Dilip Panda - Tu Thile Mo Dara Kahaku; S.K Murali Dharan - To Akhire Mu; Himashu Parija - Aa Lo Mora Kandha; Ashok Pati - Diwana
Best Actor	Best Actress
Anubhav Mohanty - Diwana; Budhaditya - Tu Thile Mo Dara Kahaku; Babushaan - To Akhire Mu; Sabyasachi Misra - Sasura Ghara Zindabad; Siddhanta Mahapatra - Swayamsiddha (2010 film)	Yukta Rakshit - Swayamsiddha; Archita Sahu - Aa Lo Mora Kandhei; Lovely - Don; Priya Chowdhury - Megha Sabari Re Asiba Pheri; Barsha Priyadarshini - Diwana
Best Actor in Negative Role	Best Comedian
Siddhanta Mahapatra - Don; Samaresh Rautrai - Prema Adhai Akshyara; Sritam Das - Don; Raimohan Parida - Tu Thile Mo Dara Kahaku; Bobby Mishra - To Akhire Mun	Papu Pom Pom - To Akhire Mun; Arabinda Sadhangi - Sasura Ghara Zindabad; Hadu - Sasura Ghara Zindabad; Harihara Mahapatra - Toro Moro Jodi Sundara
Best Supporting Actor	Best Supporting Actress
Mihir Das - Prema Adhei Akshara	Mahasweta Roy - Tu Thile Mo Dara Kahaku
Best Music director	Life-time Achievement award
Prem Anand - Alo Moro kandhei	Parbati Ghosh

== 3rd ETV Odia Film Awards 2012 ==
Best Film	Best Director
Balunga Toka - Pravas Rout	Sudhakar Basant - Balunga Toka
Best Actor	Best Actress
Anubhav Mohanty - Balunga Toka	Archita Sahu - Chocolate
Best Actor in Negative Role	Best Comedian
Siddhanta Mahapatra - Mate Bohu Kari Nei Jaa	Papu Pom Pom - Balunga Toka
Best Supporting Actor	Best Supporting Actress
Mihir Das - Criminal	Priyanka Mohapatra - Criminal
Best Music director	Best lyrics writer
Abhijit Majmudar - Balunga Toka	Nirmal Nayak- Balunga Toka
Best playback singer (male)	Best playback singer (female)
Kumar Bapi - Mu Premi Mu Pagala	Ira Mohanty- Chatire Lekhichi Tori Na
Best Debut (female)	Best Debut (male)
Munmun Khatua - Criminal	Harihar Dash- Mu Premi Mu Pagala
Life time achievement award	Best child artist
Gobind Tej	Shakti safalya

== 4th ETV Odia Film Awards 2013 ==
Best Film	Best Director
Love Master - Aparajita Mohanty	Sudhanshu Sahu - Raja Jhia Sange Heigala Bhaba
Best Actor	Best Actress
Arindam Roy - Raja Jhia Sange Heigala Bhaba	Archita Sahu -Kebe Tume Nahan Kebe Mu Nahin
Best Actor in Negative Role	Best Comedian
Siddhanta Mahapatra - Parshuram	Pragyan Khatua - Idiot: I Do Ishq Only Tumse
Best Supporting Actor	Best Supporting Actress
Mihir Das - Shapath	Aparajita Mohanty - Thukul
Best Music director	Best lyrics writer
Baidyanath Das - Gud Boy	Mohit Chakarbarti- Kebe Tume Nahan Kebe Mu Nahin
Best playback singer (male)	Best playback singer (female)
Prasanta Muduli - Thukul	Tapu Misra- Chanda Na Tume Tara
Best Debut (female)	Best Debut (male)
Prajukata Misra - Thukul	XXX- XXX
Life time achievement award
Prashant Nanda

== See also ==
- Ollywood films of 2009
- Ollywood films of 2010
