= 7th Tarang Cine Awards =

Indian film awards

The results of the 2016, 7th Tarang Cine Awards, was presented annually by the Tarang entertainment television channel to honor artistic and technical excellence in the Oriya language film industry of India ("Ollywood"), are as follow:

Category	Winner	Film
Lifetime Achievement Award	Uttam Mohanty	
Best Movie	Pooja Bharalwala	Pilata Bigidigala
Best Director	Basant Sahu	Pilata Bigidigala
Best Actor Popular	Babushaan Mohanty	Bhalapaie Tate 100 ru 100
Best Actress Popular	Archita Sahu	Pilata Bigidigala
Best Actor Jury	Sabyasachi Mishra	Pilata Bigidigala
Best Actress Jury	Riya Dey	College Time
Best Actor In Negative Role	Samaresh Routray	Ishq Tu Hi Tu
Best Actress In Negative Role		
Best Actor In Supporting Role	Mihir Das	Kie Daba Takkar
Best Actress In Supporting Role	Aparajita Mohanty	Kie Daba Takkar
Best Actor In Comic Role	Papu Pom Pom	Pilata Bigidigala
Best Debutante Actor	Pradeep Dutt	kie Daba Takkar
Best Debutante Actress	Elina Samantray	Ishq Tu Hi Tu
Best Music Director	Prem Anand	Gapa Helebi Sata
Best Lyric Writer	Nimai Mohanty	Ishq Tu Hi Tu
Best Singer Male	Human Sagar	Gapa Helebi Sata
Best Singer Female	Human Sagar	Gapa Helebi Sata
Best Dialogue Writer	Bijaya Mall	Love You Hamesha
Best Cinematography	Sanjib Mohapatra	College Time
Best Choreographer	Girish Mohanty	Ishq Tu Hi Tu
Best Child Artist	Animesh	Gapa Helebi Sata

7th Tarang Cine Awards 2016

7th Tarang Cine Awards 2016 Winners List
