= Tarang Cine Awards =

Indian film awards

- Awarded for: Awarded for cinematic achievement in Oriya film industries i.e Ollywood
- Country: India
- Presented by: Tarang entertainment television channel based in Orissa, India
- First award: 2010

The Tarang Cine Awards are presented annually by Tarang entertainment television channel to honour both artistic and technical excellence of professionals in the Oriya language film industry mainly based in State of Orissa, India.

== History ==
The awards have been instituted by Orissa Television (ORTEL) Communications that has launched the Taranga exclusive entertainment channel. To commemorate the 75 glorious years of Oriya cinema Bibhuprasad Rath, Director of Orissa Televisions Limited has announced Tarang Cine Awards during the award presentation ceremony in the Bhubaneswar on 26 February 2010.

First Tarang Cine Awards was held at Jawaharlal Nehru Indoor stadium in Cuttack on 2 May 2010.

Second Tarang cine awards held at Capital city Bhubaneswar on 26 February 2011.

== Awards ==
Tarang Cine Awards given in 18 categories to various actors, best directors, singers and other personalities in the year 2010. Apart from this, lifetime achievement award is given to one person for his/her outstanding contribution to the Oriya cine industry. In the year 2011 adding 3 new categories () Awards number goes to 21.

=== Merit awards ===
- Best Film
- Best Director
- Best Actor (Male)
- Best Actor (Female)
- Best Actor in a Supporting Role (Male)
- Best Actor in a Supporting Role (Female)
- Best Performance in a Negative Role
- Best Performance in a Comic Role
- Best Music Director
- Best Lyricist
- Best Playback Singer Male
- Best Playback Singer Female
- Best Child Artist
- Best Debutant actor

=== Technical awards ===
- Best Story
- Best Screenplay
- Best Dialogue
- Best Action
- Best Art Direction
- Best Background Score
- Best Cinematography
- Best Editing
- Best Choreography
- Best Sound Recording
- Best Special Effects
- Best Costume Design

=== Special awards ===
- Life Time Achievement

== Past ceremonies ==
The following is a listing of all Tarang Cine Awards ceremonies and ratings since 2010.

Ceremony	Date	Venue	Best film winner
1st Tarang Cine Awards	2 May 2010	Jawaharlal Nehru Indoor stadium, Cuttack	Abhimanyu
2nd Tarang Cine Awards	5 March 2011	KISS campus, Bhubaneswar	Sanju Aau Sanjana
3rd Tarang Cine Awards	11 March 2012	Janata Maidan, Bhubaneswar	Chocolate
4th Tarang Cine Awards	3 March 2013	Janata Maidan Bhubaneswar	Something Something
5th Tarang Cine Awards	9 March 2014	Jawaharlal Nehru Indoor stadium, Cuttack	Hata Dhari Chalutha
6th Tarang Cine Awards	14 March 2015	Jawaharlal Nehru Indoor stadium, Cuttack	Smile Please
7th Tarang Cine Awards	20 March 2016	Baljatra Ground, Cuttack	Pilata Bigidigala
8th Tarang Cine Awards	18 March 2017	Janata Maidan, Bhubaneswar	Love Station
9th Tarang Cine Awards	18 March 2018	East Coast Railway Sports Complex near Mancheswar Stadium, Bhubaneswar	Hero No.1

== Telecast ==
The 9th Tarang Cine Awards was telecasted on Tarang TV on Sunday, 1 April 2018 at 6:30 P.M.
