= 8th Tarang Cine Awards =

Indian film awards

The results of the 2017, 8th Tarang Cine Awards, was presented annually by the Tarang entertainment television channel to honor artistic and technical excellence in the Oriya language film industry of India ("Ollywood"), are as follow:

Category	Winner	Film
Lifetime Achievement Award	Debu Bose	
Best Movie	Jagi Mangat Panda	Love Station
Best Director	Ashok Pati	Love Station
Best Actor Popular	Babushaan Mohanty	Love Pain Kuch Bhi Kaerega
Best Actress Popular	Archita Sahu	Bye Bye Dubai
Best Actor In Negative Role	Mihir Das	Gunda
Best Actor In Supporting Role	Akas Das Nayak	Agastya
Best Actress In Supporting Role	Mamuni Mishra	Gunda
Best Actor In Comic Role	Papu Pom Pom	Bye Bye Dubai
Best Debutante Actor	Subham Naik	Premara nisha niara niara
Best Debutante Actress	Niharika Das	Tu Kahibu Na Mu
Best Music Director	Abhijit Majumdar	Love Pain Kuch Bhi Kaerega
Best Lyric Writer	Arun Mantri	Love Paein Kuch Bhi Kaerega
Best Singer Male	Satyajit Pradhan	Love Paein Kuch Bhi Kaerega
Best Singer Female	Ananya Nanda	Agastya
Best Dialogue Writer	Ranjit Patnaik	Love Paein Kuch Bhi Kaerega
Best Cinematography	Dilip Ray	Chinni
Best Choreographer	Sudhakara Bsanta	Love Station
Best Child Artist	Priti Priyadarshini	Baby
