= Swayamsiddha =

- Theatrical poster
- Directed by: Sudhanshu Sahu
- Written by: Namita Malik
- Screenplay by: Dilip Choudhury
- Produced by: Prabhat Ranjan Mallick
- Starring: Siddhanta Mahapatra; Yukta Inderlal Mookhey; Aparajita Mohanty; Sunil Kumar; Anita Das; Pintu Nanda
- Cinematography: Sanjeev Mohapatra
- Edited by: Chandra Sekhar Mishra
- Music by: Swarup Nayak
- Production company: N K Media Ventures
- Distributed by: N K Media Ventures
- Release date: 13 August 2010
- Country: India
- Language: Odia

Swayamsiddha is a 2010 Odia film directed by Sudhanshu Sahu with a screenplay and dialogue by Dilip Choudhury, produced by Prabhat Ranjan Mallik, and starring Siddhanta Mahapatra and Yukta Inderlal Mookhey. The film focuses on the implications for the young mass adopting to Maoist insurgency and their sustained alienation from the mainstream as a result. Geo-strategic importance of changing the minds of young people adopting terrorism through love and affection. The film traces the crisis from social trauma to unfair state system encouraging Mao-Naxal insurgency in Odisha.

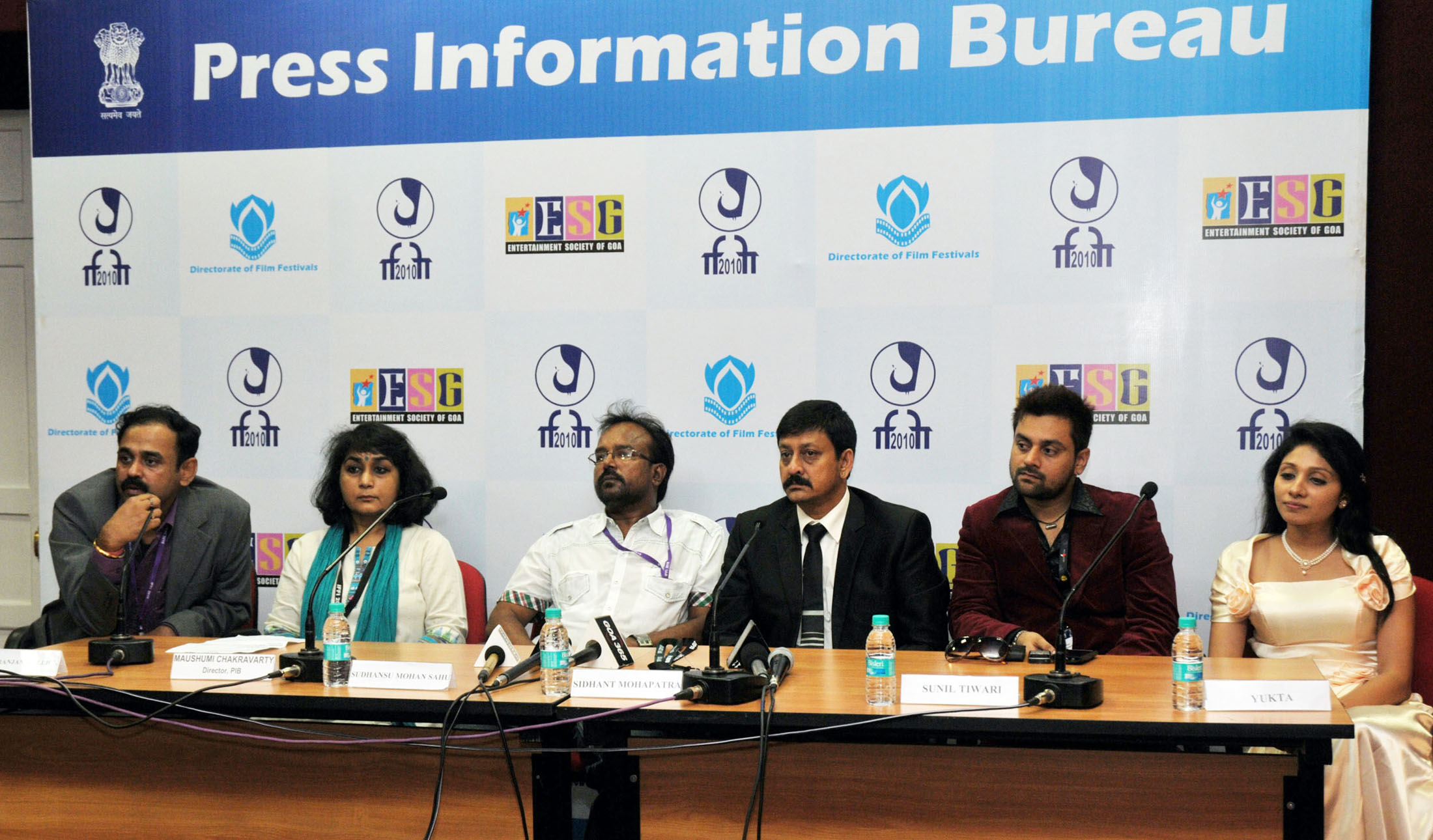
Film crew, IFFI (2010)

== Cast ==
- Siddhanta Mahapatra as Digvijay
- Yukta Inderlal Mookhey as Shreya / Swayamsidha
- Sunil Kumar as Raj
- Aparajita Mohanty
- Anita Das
- Shweta Acharya
- Dushmant
- Pradyumna Lenka
- Pintu Nanda
- Prasanna Kumar Patasani
- Matru Prasad
- Sarojini Rout

== Production ==
The muhurat took place in Taupadar near Deomali. The film Swayamsidha in fact was shot under very challenging and turbulent situations. Most of part of the film are filming at Naxalite-Maoist insurgency areas in Koraput district of Orissa state.

== Controversy ==
As the main co-star of the film Siddhanta Mahapatra is an M.P. and belongs to the ruling party Biju Janata Dal of Orissa portrays himself as a Maoist leader in the film, the opposition parties in the state went on strikes and demanded ban on release of the film. Hundreds of Congress activists were arrested for disrupting the screening of the film.

== Music ==
The music of the film composed by Swarup Nayak. The tracks from the film include:

Track	Singer	Lyricist
"Dekha Aakasha Pindhichhi Indradhanu Odhani"	Kumar Bapi	Swarup Nayak
"Ho Aame Matira Manisha He Matira"	Kumar Bapi, T. Souri	Swarup Nayak
"Jadi Ei Pruthibita Samayara"	Tapu Mishra	Swarup Nayak
"Kichhi Kichhi Katha To Manare"	Tapu Mishra, Kumar Bapi	Swarup Nayak
"Koili Koili Aa Pakhaku Mora"	Tapu Mishra	Swarup Nayak
"Mun Mo Nijathu Aaji Gali Durei"	Tapu Mishra	Swarup Nayak

== Awards ==
- Mohan Sundar Deb Goswami Award
- Odisha State Film Award for Best Film
- 2nd Etv Oriya Film Awards 2011 Best Actor Siddhanta Mahapatra
- Special Jury Award of 2010 in 2nd Tarang Cine Awards 2011
- Best Cinematographer of 2010 Odisha State Film Award for Best Photography and 2nd Tarang Cine Awards 2011
- Best Director of 2010 in 2nd Tarang Cine Awards 2011
- Best Editor of 2010 in 2nd Tarang Cine Awards 2011
- Best Screenplay of 2010 in State Awards, 2nd Tarang Cine Awards 2011
- Best sound design of 2010 in State Awards, 2nd Tarang Cine Awards 2011
- Best Odia Film of 2010 in Etv Oriya Film Awards 2011
- Best Director of 2010 in Etv Oriya Film Awards 2011
- Best cinematographer of 2010 in Etv Oriya Film Awards 2011
