= Something Something =

Something Something may refer to:

- Unakkum Enakkum, a 2006 Tamil-language film formerly known as Something Something... Unakkum Enakkum
- Something Something (2012 film), a 2012 Odia-language film
  - Something Something 2 (2014), a sequel to the 2012 film
- Something Something (2013 film), a partially Telugu-dubbed version of Tamil-language film Theeya Velai Seiyyanum Kumaru
- Something Something (album), a 2006 album by Mika Singh
