= 3rd Tarang Cine Awards =

Indian film awards

The results of the 2012 3rd Tarang Cine Awards, the awards presented annually by the Tarang entertainment television channel to honor artistic and technical excellence in the Oriya language film industry of India ("Ollywood"), are as follow:

- Lifetime Achievement – Sarat Pujari
- Best Film – Chocolate
- Best Director – Sushant Mani -Chocolate
- Best Actor – Anubhav Mohanty - Balunga Toka
- Best Actress – Archita Sahu -Chocolate
- Best Lyricist – Bapu Goswami -Chocolate
- Best Singer – Babusan Mohanty -Chocolate
- Best Editor – Biren Jyoti Mohanty -Chocolate
- Best Dialogues – Bapu Goswami - Chocolate
- Best Cinematography – Apurba Kishore Bir - Jianta Bhuta
- Best Comedian – Papu Pom Pom -Balunga Toka
- Best Actor (Debut) – Harihar Das -Mu Premi Mu Pagala
- Best Actress (Debut) – Anubha Sourya -Mu Premi Mu Pagala
- Best Actor (in a Negative Role) – Samaresh Routray - Loafer
