= Mu Eka Tumara =

2013 Odia film directed by Sushant Mani

- Theatrical release poster
- Directed by: Susant Mani
- Produced by: Sitaram Agrawal, Namita Agrawal
- Starring: Sabyasachi; Archita; Mihir Das; Bijay Mohanty; Mahasweta Ray; Usashi Mishra
- Cinematography: Abhiram Mishra
- Edited by: Sukumar Mani
- Music by: Bikash Das
- Distributed by: Sarthak Production
- Release date: 14 June 2013
- Running time: 140 minutes
- Country: India
- Language: Odia
- Box office: ₹4.16 crore

Mu Eka Tumara (English: I am only for you) is a 2013 Indian Odia language romantic drama film. The film is written by Sidharth and directed by Susant Mani and stars Sabyasachi and Archita in their Seventh movie together. This film won the Best Odia film, Best Oriya Direction, Best Oriya Actor (Male) and Best Oriya Actor (Female) categories in the Filmfare Awards East 2013. The film was a remake of 2003 Kannada blockbuster film Chandra Chakori starring Sri Murali.

== Plot ==
The Movie premise is of a big Odia wedding where Virendra (Mihir Das)'s son Mahesh (Debashis) is all set to marry Pratap (Prutiviraj Nayak)'s daughter Chitralekha (Archita). Both families have come together to stay at Virendra's farm-house for the next four days for this grand wedding. Introduced here is Raju (Sabyasachi) who works as a servant at Virendra's place. Raju is an innocent person who can hear and understand everything but is unable to speak a word. Circumstances lead to Raju rescuing Chitra from danger. Later Chitra finds out that Raju is not a natural mute. He can actually speak but has chosen not to utter a word due to unknown reasons. After knowing about Raju's past, Chitra fall in love with him. She decides to marry Raju instead of Mahesh. The reason behind Raju's Mutism and the consequences thereafter form the crux of the movie.

== Cast ==
- Sabyasachi as Raju
- Archita as Chitralekha
- Bijay Mohanty
- Mihir Das as Virendra
- Debasis as Mahesh
- Prutiviraj Nayak as Pratap
- Priyanka
- Ushashi Mishra
- Satyaki Mishra
- Harihara Mohapatra
- Mahasweta

== Soundtrack ==
Mun Eka Tumara

Soundtrack album by Bikash Das
- Released: 9 June 2013 (India)
- Recorded: Sarthak Music
- Genre: Film soundtrack
- Producer: Sitaram Agrawal

Professional ratings
Review scores
Source	Rating
Fullorissa	4/5 stars

Music has been well composed by Bikash Das

Song	Artist	Length
"Tuma bina kaha ku "	Udit Narayan & Namita Agrawall	05:02
"Dine Ei Ranga"	Saurin Bhatt & Namita Agrawall	04.48
"Mu Eka Tumara "	Udit Narayan & Namita Agrawall	05:02
"Suna Jhia Mo Sate"		
"Maalo Mali Bichha"		
"Kiese Kahinki"		
