= 6th Tarang Cine Awards =

Indian film awards

The results of the 2015, 6th Tarang Cine Awards, was presented annually by the Tarang entertainment television channel to honor artistic and technical excellence in the Oriya language film industry of India ("Ollywood"), are as follow:

Category	Winner	Film
Lifetime Achievement Award	Uttam Mohanty	
Best Movie	Rabin Nanda & Rajesh Padhi	Smile Please
Best Director	Tapas Jena & Pradip Das	2014 Fear of The Year
Best Actor	Anubhav Mohanty	Something Something 2
Best Actress	Jhilak Bhattarchjee	Akhire Akhire
Best Actor In Negative Role	Budhaditya Mohanty	Sangam
Best Actress In Negative Role	Signdha Mohanty	Tu Mo Suna Tu Mo Hira
Best Actor In Supporting Role	Mihir Das	Smile Please
Best Actress In Supporting Role	Aparajita Mohanty	Daddy
Best Actor In Comic Role	Harihara Mahapatra	Daddy
Best Debutante Actor	Lambodar Hota	Rasta
Best Debutante Actress	Tapasya Tripathy	One Way Traffic
Best Music Director	Bikash Das	Daddy
Best Lyric Writer	Arun Mantri	Something Something 2
Best Singer Male	Ratikant Satapathy	Mu Tara Kie
Best Singer Female	Trupti Das	Mu Tara Kie
Best Dialogue Writer	Rajani Ranjan	Smile Please
Best Cinematography	Abhiram Misra	2014 Fear of The Year
Best Choreographer	S. K. Muralidharan	Smile Please
Best Child Artist	Lipunita	To Bata Chahinchi Rati Sara
Best Actor (Jury)	Sabyasachi Misra	Smile Please
Best Actress (Jury)	Archita Sahu	Smile Please
