= Akshay Parija =

Indian film maker

Akshay Kumar Parija
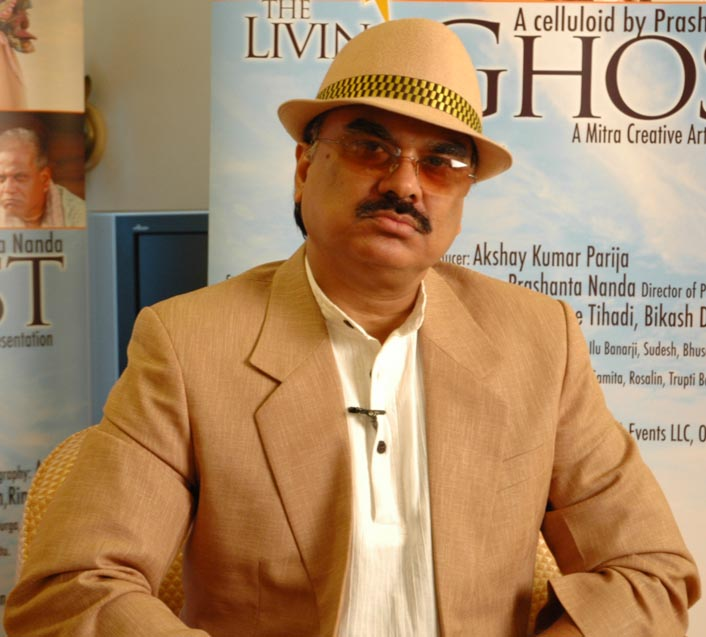
- Born: 12 May 1954 (age 72); Jagatsinghpur, Orissa, India
- Children: Payal Parija
- Parents: Alekha Bihari Parija (father); Khetramani (mother)
- Awards: President Award at 64th National Film Awards, President Award at 56th National Film Awards

Akshay Kumar Parija (born 12 May 1954) is an Indian filmmaker known for his depictions of Odia culture and Odissi dance in his films. He is the first Odia to have a film, Papa Buka (2025) nominated for the 98th Academy Awards. Originally he is a banker and currently lives in Dubai.

== Life and career ==
Akshay Parija was born in a Karan family & he presently serves as Board Member and Executive Director to Blue Lines Shipping Group which he founded in the year 2010. He is the Chairman of Odisha's Premiere OTT Platform Kancha Lannka. Blue Lines Shipping has its operation all across the globe.

Originally a banker for over 30 years, he transitioned into filmmaking to promote Odia culture globally. Parija has served in Burgan Bank, Kuwait for 8 years (1983-1991), in National Bank of Oman for 7 years (1991-1998) and 12 years in Bank Muscat in different senior positions. He started his banking career at Indian Overseas Bank at Bissam Cuttack in 1976. In recognition of his contribution to films and television, he was accorded the Dubai Golden Visa in 2023. His international co-production Papa Buka was selected as Papua New Guinea's official entry for the 98th Academy Awards.

An alumnus of Harvard Business School, USA, he has studied in Utkal University (ଉତ୍କଳ ବିଶ୍ୱବିଦ୍ୟାଳୟ) for Masters, and BJB College for graduation as well. Akshay Kumar Parija has schooled from Jagannathpur High School in Tiran of undivided Cuttack district.

== Filmography ==
Produced:

Film	Director	Year	Language	Awards & Remarks
Jianta Bhoota	Prashant Nanda	2008	Odia	Best Film on Environment Conservation/Preservation at 56th National Film Awards Mohan Sundar Deb Goswami Awards- 2008 for Best Film Special recognition Film Award at OMAN Green Awards' 2011 Membership Achievement Award- 2010 for his role as the Producer at OSA, San Francisco, Bay Area Jury Award for Best Foreigner Film-2010 at 6th Muscat Film Festival
Thukool	Prashant Nanda	2012	Odia	
Kehi Nuhe Kahara	Susant Mani	2015	Odia	Mohan Sundar Deb Goswami Awards Best Feature Film- 2015 Best Supporting Actress Best Screenplay Best Lyrics Best Sound Best Costume Best Make-up
Agastya	K Murlee Krishna	2016	Odia	
Bye Bye Dubai	Basanta Sahoo	2016	Odia	
God's Own People (A Documentary on NABAKALEBARA of Lord Shri Jagannath)	Nila Madhab Panda	2016	Hindi	
Kadvi Hawa	Nila Madhab Panda	2016	Hindi	President's Award at 64th National Film Awards
Love U Jessica	Susant Mani	2016	Odia	Best Supporting Actor Best Editor Best Sound Best Screenplay
Halka	Nila Madhab Panda	2018	Hindi	Grand Prix de Montreal at Toronto
Paika Bidroha		2018	Odia	Best Tele-Film Award at 30th State Tele Awards Best Director Best DOP Best Editor
4 Idiots	Basanta Sahoo	2018	Odia	
Andhakare Alo	Ashoke Viswanathan	2018	Bengali	
Bhija Mati Ra Swarga	Manmohan Mahapatra	2018	Odia	Mohan Sundar Dev Goswami-Best Film Award at 30th State Film Awards Best Director Best Screenplay Best Cinematography
Manojer Adbut Bari	Anindya Chatterjee	2018	Bengali	
Rasogolla	Pavel	2018	Bengali	
Biju Babu	Debiprasad Lenka & Vishal Mourya	2019	Odia	
Mukherjee Dar Bou	Pritha Chakraborty	2019	Bengali	
Life In A Day	Aniket Rumde	2019	Hindi	
Chirkut	Tatwa Prakash Satapathy (Papu Pam Pam)	2019	Odia	
Konttho	Shiboprosad Mukherjee & Nandita Roy	2019	Bengali	
Gotro	Shiboprosad Mukherjee & Nandita Roy	2019	Bengali	

It was his experience of tribal culture in Bissam Cuttack that prompted him to produce Jiantaa Bhoota (The Living Ghost), the National Award-winning film that yet again put the limelight on Odia film Industry. Directed by Prashant Nanda, the film dealt with exploitation of environment, economy, culture in the name of industrialisation and resultant displacement, focusing on vanishing culture of Dongria Kondha tribals inhabiting the Niyamgiri Hills of Rayagada district due to mindless mining.

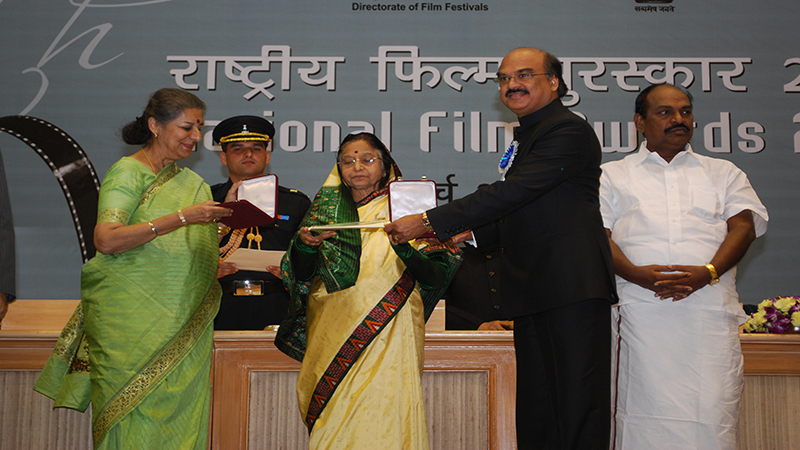
56th National Film Awards for Best Film on Environment from President of India Mrs. Pratibha Patil.

Both the director and producer won the National Award in 2008 from the President of India and the sensitive film that was adjudged as the 'Best Film on Protection of Environment'. This apart, Jianta Bhoota won seven- State Film Awards in various categories including the Best Film. Jianta Bhoota also bagged Best Production, Best Direction and Best Film on Social Issues at the sixth Independent South Asian Film Festival (ISAFF) in the United States.

As a culture enthusiast, Akshay Parija also holds the reputation of giving international wings to Odissi dance. For a period of over 15 years, he took Odissi onto different stages of Far East, Middle East, and Europe, besides the United States. Thukool was his second Ollywood venture, focused on Odissi dance and portrayed the story of a dancer. Dubbed as one of the most expensive movies of 2011-12, Thukool was made at the cost of Rs 3 crore which is still the highest production cost in Odia Film Industry. Shot in exotic locations in the Middle-East, Thukool scored on locales, music, costumes and post-production. For the movie, Parija ensured the best of all elements of film-making including technicians. While post-production of Thukool was done at Chennai, some of the computer graphics were done in London. The film starred Archita Sahu, Babushaan and Pakruti Mishra. The movie went on to bag five State Film Awards besides, four ETV Cine Awards, as many Tarang Cine Awards and seven Chalachitra Jagat Awards.

His next film was Kehi Nuhen Kahar and that was followed by association with documentary feature God's Own People which dealt with the Trinity's (Lord Jagannath, Devi Subhadra, Lord Balabhadra) Nabakalebara. The 88-minute documentary was directed by Nila Madhab Panda (Padmashree Awardee) to portray the unique rituals of the Trinity that occur once in every 19 years.

Apart from Odia films, Akshay Kumar Parija had produced a number of reality talent hunt shows and tele-serials for different satellite channels. These include Sahanai for Tarang TV, Dancing Stars and Aaina for Colours Odia. Akshay Kumar Parija now plans to venture into promoting Odia music at national and international forums, here he has recently tied up with Devdas Chhotray and singer Bibhu Kishore for an album Blue Mood. While Devdas Chhotray has penned eight poems for the album, Biebhu Kishore has lent his voice to the songs. Also in the pipeline this year is Sushant Mani's much talked about Love You Jessica that Akshya Kumar Parija has produced. He has joined hands with Nilamadhab Panda for a Hindi film titled Dark Winds that deals with climate change.

'Kadvi Hawa' deals with the most explosive subject of the world as of today: climate change. The story is conceived and written by Padmashree Awardee Director Shri Nilamadhab Panda.

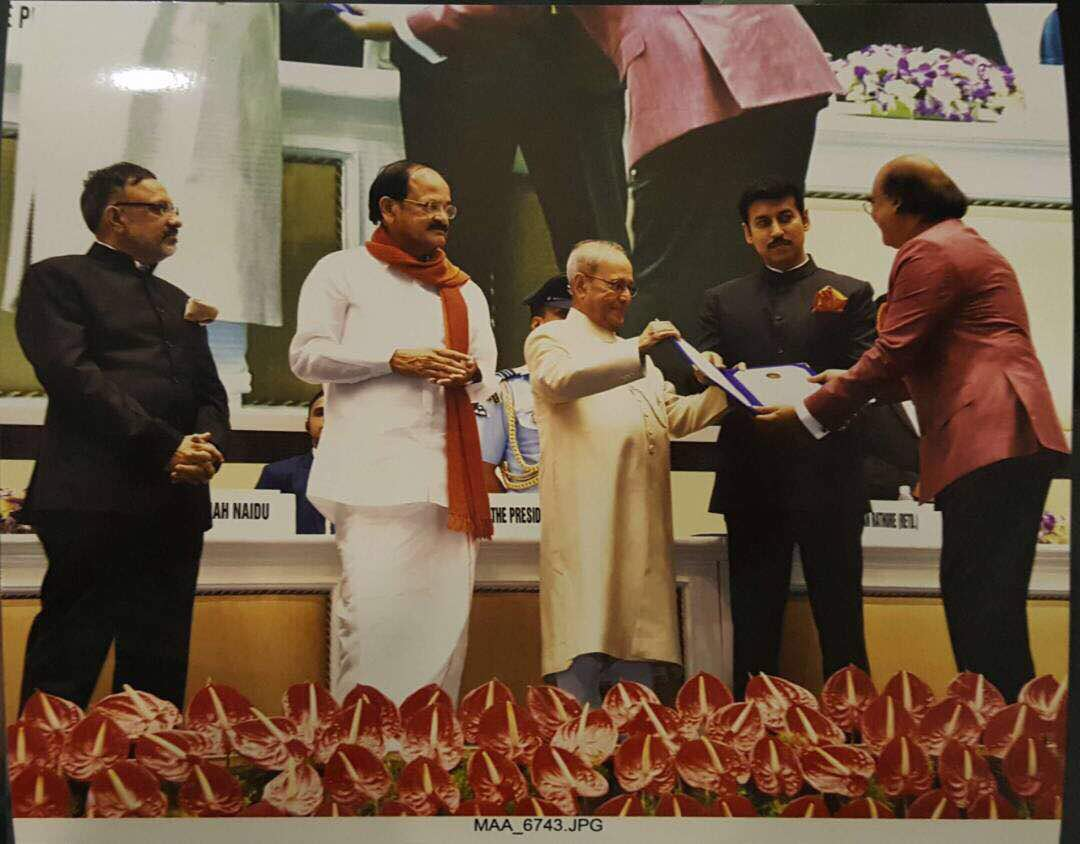
Special Mention film-2016 from the President of India Shri Pranab Mukherjee for the Movie “Kadvi Hawa”.

The movie is a positive initiative and awareness for the world of the menace of changing global climatic conditions, which affects millions across the globe.

== Awards ==
- 56th National Film Awards, 2008, Best Film on Environment Conservation/Preservation for The Living Ghost (Jiaanta Bhoota).
- 64th National Film Awards 2016 from the President of India Shri Pranab Mukherjee for the Movie "Kadvi Hawa".
- Prabasi Odia Pratibha Samman, 2011 by Non-resident Odia Facilitation Centre Bhubaneswar
- Community Service award, 2011 by Kuwait Odia Association for promoting Odia culture outside India and contribution to Odia films
- 36th Annual Function & Chalachitra Jagata Pratibha Samman, 2011 for Best Film Producer for Jianta Bhoota
- Mohan Sundar Deb Goswami Awards, 2008 for Best film Jianta Bhoota
- WASITRAC Honors & Recognition for Akshay Ku Parija for his extraordinary contribution in promoting international cultures & trade 2010 by Lt. Governor Brad Owen, Space Needle, Seattle, 2010
- 37th Annual Orissa Society of the Americas as Member Achievement Award.
- Special recognition film award to The Living Ghost at OMAN Green Awards 2011
- Guest of Honour & Speaker 2015, Jagannath Society Of The Americas, Nashville
- Special Recognition at 42nd Annual OSA Convention' 2011
- Appreciation for support & contribution to Prabasi Odia Samaj, Abu dhabi, 2013
- Membership Achievement Award, His role as the producer of the award-winning movie The Living Ghost, 2010, San Francisco, Bay Area, OSA
- Chitralipi Samman 2012, Best Film Jiaanta Bhoota
- 6th Muscat Film Festival, Jury Award for Best Foreigner Film, The Living Ghost, 2010
- Mohan Sundar Deb Goswami Awards Best Feature Film-2015 award at State Odia Awards
- Odia Film Fair Award, 2015, Best Producer, Kehi Nuhe Kahara
- Banichitra Cine Award- 2016
- Basant Nayak Smruti Samman 2015 by Cinema Sansara
- ACRUX Showcase Odisha Awards- 2014 by Prelude Communications
- Utkal Pratibha Samman 2015
- 6th Odia Film Fair Award 2015
- Cinema Duniya Award 2016
- Chalachitra Jagat Prativa Samman, 2015, Debabrata Kar Memorial Best Film Award for the film Kehi Nuhe Kahara
- Guru Gangadhar Smruti Samman, 2016, 12th Dhauli Kalinga
- Jiaanta Bhoota won record Seven State Awards, a record in Odisha
