= List of Odia films of 2014 =

This article lists of films produced by the Ollywood film industry and released in theaters in the year 2014. Premiere shows and film festival screenings are not considered as releases for this list.

== Oriya Films ==
#	Release	Title	Director	Producer	Cast	CBFC
1	1 January	Akhire Akhire	Susant Mani	Sitaram Agarwal	Babushaan Mohanty, Jhilik Bhattacharjee, Sidhant Mohapatra, Bijay Mohanty, Aparajita Mohanty	U/A
2	10 January	Tu Au Mu	Nishikanta Dalabehera	Soumya Ranjan Patnaik	Bijendra, Vandana, Kuna Tripathy, Aparajita, Mihir Das, Salil, Leena	U
3	10 January	To Bata Cahichi Rati Sara	Sanjay Nayak	Sanjay Nayak	Chandan Kar, Priya, Debu Bose, Anita Das	U/A
4	4 February	Puni Dekha Haba Ara Janamare	Ashok Kumar Mohanty	Ashok Kumar Mohanty	Bobby Mishra, Rali Nanda, Priyanka, Mihir Das, Aparajita, Pintu Nanda	U
5	27 February	Khaas Tumari Paain	Sushanta Kumar Ratha	Sushanta Kumar Ratha	Dushmant, Devjani, Pinki Priyadarshini, Debu Bose	U/A
6	13 March	Smile Please	S.K. Murlidharan	Rabin Kumar Nanda, Rajesh Padhi	Sabyasachi Mishra, Archita Sahu	U
7	4 April	Jai Hind	Ranjan Mishra	Pravati Mohapatra	Dipan, Ijji, Minaketan, Saroj Das	U
8	14 April	Daddy: The Living God	Appu Kanungo	Chittaranjan Mishra	Arindam, Mihir Das, Aparajita, Lipi	U
9	1 May	Hari Bola Nuha Tanka Bola	Krishna Prasad	Srinibash Padhiari	Chunga, Kalpana, Jayee, Braja	U/A
10	9 May	Sahitya Didi	Manoranjan Pal	Manoranjan Pal	Ronak Das, Adit Dikhit, Jyoti Mohapatra, Pintu Nanda	A
11	23 May	Omm: I Am Not God	Sudhakar Vasanth	Sudhakar Vasanth, Samaresh Routray	Sambit, Prakruti Mishra, Samaresh	U/A
12	13 June	Golapi Golapi	Susant Mani	Sitaram Agrawal	Amlan Das, Riya Dey, Sidhant Mohapatra, Mihir Das, Aparajita Mohanty	U/A
13	14 June	Something Something 2	Sudhakar Vasanth	Anuprash Mohanty	Anubhav Mohanty, Barsha Priyadarshini, Dhirendra Nath	U
14	14 June	Sangam	Jatin Kumar Agarwal	Divyajyoti Amman	Siddhanta Mahapatra, Budhaditya, Akash, Jyoti Pani	U/A
15	11 July	2014 Fear of the Year	Tapas Jena, Pradeep Das	A. Pradeep Kumar	Sambit, Dushmant, Elli	A
16	9 August	Kidnap	Srimanchala Nayak	Lokanath Das	Mina Ketan, Puspa Panda, Runu Mahapatra	
17	29 August	Lekhu Lekhu Lekhi Deli	Susant Mani	Sitaram Agrawalla	Babushaan Mohanty, Jhilik Bhattacharjee, Aparajita Mohanty, Mahasweta Ray	U
18	29 August	Ame Ta Toka Sandha Marka	R. Bhagat Singh	Sangita Satpathy	Papu Pompom, Koeal, Mihir Das	A
19	Oct	Pagala Karichu Tu		Sitaram Agrawalla	Amlan, Riyaa	U/A
