= Bande Utkala Janani (film) =

2008 Indian Odia film

- Directed by: Suvendu Swain
- Written by: Suvendu Swain
- Produced by: Debasish Dogra; Pragati Mohanty
- Starring: Siddhanta Mahapatra; Sabyasachi Misra; Meenaketan; Arpita Mukherjee; Smita
- Cinematography: Abhiram Mishra
- Edited by: Susanta Mani
- Music by: Sarat Nayak
- Distributed by: Lotus Films Pvt Ltd
- Release date: 2 October 2008
- Country: India
- Language: Odia
- Budget: 1.5 cr.
- Box office: 2.5 cr.

Bande Utkala Janani (Salute to Mother Utkala) is a 2008 Indian Odia-language film directed by Suvendu Swain. The film deals with themes of patriotism and honesty towards profession. That this is the first Odia film released through satellite using Digital UFO system.

== Story ==
In this story a lady journalist holds the key to the story and due to her courage, risk taking and confidence the secret is revealed and the story moves. The police station is the family which is the center of all activities. Three police officers and the lady journalist are working together with a common goal to eradicate political corruption and hooliganism in the society.

== Cast ==
- Siddhanta Mahapatra
- Ashish Rawde
- Sabyasachi Mishra
- Arpita Mukherjee
- Minaketan Das
- Hara Rath
- Smitha Mohanty
- Ashru Mochan Mohanty
- Raicharan Das
- Matru Prasad
- Sachidananda Panda

== Music ==
In this movie the songs are composed by Sarat Nayak. The lyrics are by Bapu Goswami, Panchanana Nayak, and Bijaya Malla. Music arrangement by Nityashri Ranjan. To make it appealing to youth all songs have been done by keyboard sequencing. Abhijit Majumdar is the first composer after Late Sri Akshaya Mohanty to sing a song in a film for another music composer.

== Reception ==
The irony of the situation is that the film's title itself suggests that it is a patriotic movie and it portrays three honest police officers fighting corruption. Some of the noted actors have been cast in the film and the producer and the director have left no stone unturned to show skin, much to the disgust of Oriyas. Bande Utkal Janani, was supposed to be a social, action-oriented drama. But it is a terrible movie. Even the songs are not good. The only exception in the film is Minaketan (the main villain). His portrayal of a corrupt politician who uses rustic language certainly deserves accolade.
