= Sasura Ghara Zindabad =

- Directed by: Sanjay Nayak
- Screenplay by: Sanjay Nayak
- Produced by: Uttam Chand Jain
- Starring: Sabyasachi Misra; Megha Ghosh; Bijay Mohanty; Tandra Roy; Jairam Samal; Hadu Patnaik
- Cinematography: Ranjan
- Music by: Abhijit Majumdar
- Production company: Top Films
- Distributed by: Top Films
- Release date: 13 August 2010
- Country: India
- Language: Odia

Sasura Ghara Zindabad is a 2010 Oriya film written and directed by Sanjay Nayak. The film revolves around three sons-in-law. The film achieved the rare distinction of entering the Limca Book of Records for having approval of censorship as one of two films by the same producer, director, cinematographer and hero, along with the film Dil Tate Deichi on the same day.

== Plot ==
The story is about three sons-in-law. The youngest of them is Raja, played by Sabyasachi Mishra. The middle son-in-law is Hadu Patnaik, while the eldest of them is Arvind. These three marry the daughters of the rich industrialist Biren Mishra. The three heroines are Mayuri, Deepali and Megha. The father-in-law has two wives, played respectively by Puspa Panda and Snigdha Mohanty. Apparently, the eldest two of the sons-in-law are living off the property of their father-in-law, sitting idle. When the third son-in-law arrives on the scene, who is a petty thief, he quickly changes the situation.

== Cast ==
- Sabyasachi Mishra as Raja
- Megha Ghosh as Preeti
- Hadu Patnaik
- Arabinda
- Deepali
- Mayuri
- Minaketan
- Biran Misra
- Bijay Mohanty
- Pushpa Panda
- Tandra Roy
- Jairam Samal

== Music ==
The music of the film composed by Abhijit Majumdar. The tracks from the film include:

Track	Singer	Lyricist
Aakhi Misheile Karinebi Najara Hata Misheile	Abhijit Misra	Nirmal Nayak
Aakhire Othare Nidare Swopnare Kehi Jane	Manas Pritam & Ira Mohanty	Sujit Parija
Bagha Aji Men Men Heichhi Chheli	Abhijit Majumdar	Arun Mantri
Omm Nama Nama Sashu Debi Namaste	Bibhu Kishor	Basant Raj Samal
Sunathu Adhika Suna Laguchhi Rupathu Adhika	Kumar Sanu & Ira Mohanty	Arun Mantri

== Awards and nominations ==
- Nomination for Best Actor Sabyasachi Mishra in 2nd Etv Oriya Film Awards 2011
- Nomination for Best Comedian Hadu Patnaik in 2nd Etv Oriya Film Awards 2011
- Nomination for Best Comedian Arabinda in 2nd Etv Oriya Film Awards 2011
- Nomination for Best Playback singer Bibhu Kishor in 2nd Etv Oriya Film Awards 2011
