= Pua Mora Bhola Sankara =

- Official poster
- Directed by: Hara Patnaik
- Written by: Subodh Pattanaik (dialogue)
- Screenplay by: Subodh Pattanaik
- Story by: Hara Patnaik
- Produced by: Sailabala Lenka
- Starring: Siddhanta Mahapatra; Rachana Banerjee; Mihir Das; Priyanka Mohapatra
- Cinematography: Dilip Ray
- Edited by: Deben Misra
- Music by: Swarup Nayak; Subash Ram
- Release date: 12 June 1996
- Country: India
- Language: Odia

Pua Mora Bhola Sankara is a 1996 Indian Odia-language film directed by Hara Patnaik starring Siddhanta Mahapatra, Rachna Banerjee and Mihir Das. The film was a box office success and made Mihir Das popular.

== Cast ==
- Siddhanta Mahapatra as Kumar Rai
- Rachana Banerjee as Geetha
- Mihir Das as Sankar
- Priyanka Mohapatra as Shanti
- Hara Patnaik as Ajay Patnaik
- Debu Bose as Tara Sankar Patnaik
- Jayiram Samal as Dhadi
- Bina Moharana

== Production ==
The film is produced by Pradyumna Lenka. Rakhee Dash dubbed for Rachna Banerjee. Mihir Das was cast as an innocent servant. This is Priyanka Mohapatra's first film and she was cast opposite Das. The fight sequences were choreographed by Rama Murthy. Chandi Parija worked an associate director in this film. In an interview, Mihir Das called this film his best work.

== Soundtrack ==
The music was composed by Swarup Nayak and Subash Ram.

- "Daiba Hatare Manisa Jibana" - Subhash Ram
- "Tutamu Tutamu Tanana Tike Kahi Dia Na" - Bibhu Das, Gita Das
- "E Mani E Sanga Bayata" - Debasish Mohapatra
- "Jay Jay Bhola Sankara Bhola Maheswara" - Subas Das
- "Sukha Dukha Duniara" - Trupti Das

== Awards ==
Award	Category	Recipient(s)	Result	Ref.
Orissa State Film Awards 1996	Best Actor	Mihir Das	Won	
