= Pushkara (film) =

- Directed by: Subhransu Das
- Written by: Pinaki Srichandan
- Screenplay by: Debidutta Mohanty, Chitra Pattanaik, Janmejay Singh
- Story by: Shankar Tripathy
- Based on: Nadabindu (Odia novel)
- Starring: Sabyasachi Mishra; Supriya Nayak; Ashrumochan Mohanty; Pintu Nanda
- Cinematography: Falgu Satapathy
- Edited by: Ranjan Khatei, Sukumar Mani
- Music by: Bibhuti Bhusan Gadanayak
- Production company: Tarang Cine Productions
- Distributed by: Rajshri Productions
- Release date: 19 September 2023
- Country: India
- Language: Odia
- Budget: est. ₹ 50 Lakh

Pushkara is a 2023 Indian Odia-language film directed by Subhransu Das in his debut and released on 19 September 2023 on the occasion of Ganesh Puja. It was made by Tarang Cine Productions. Musician Bibhuti Bhusan Gadanayak composed all the songs in the movie. Sabyasachi Mishra and Supriya Nayak played the lead role. Actors like Choudhury Bikash Das, Asrumochan Mohanty, Pintu Nanda, Tribhuban Panda, Alka Satpathy, Rabi Mishra, Sankarsan Pradhan played various roles in the movie.

== Cast ==
- Sabyasachi Mishra
- Supriya Nayak
- Choudhury Bikash Das
- Asrumochan Mohanty
- Pintu Nanda
- Tribhuban Panda
- Alka Satpathy
- Rabi Mishra
- Sankarsan Pradhan

== Production ==
The movie is based on an Odia novel, Nadabindu written by Shankar Tripathy. The movie is filmed in various locations of Puri and shown different traditions like Jagaghara, Sahi Jata, Danga bhasa, and other rituals of Lord Jagannath.

== Release ==
This movie was released on 19 September 2023 in theaters. Rajshri Productions has distributed the movie.
