= 4th Tarang Cine Awards =

Indian film awards

The results of the 2013 4th Tarang Cine Awards, the awards presented annually by the Tarang entertainment television channel to honor artistic and technical excellence in the Oriya language film industry of India ("Ollywood"), are as follow:

- Best Film: Something Something
- Best Actor (Male): Anubhav Mohanty- Something Something
- Best Actor (Female): Barsha Priyadarshini - Something Something
- Best Actor in Supporting Role (Male): Mihir Das - Shapath
- Best Actor in Supporting Role (Female): Aparajita Mohanty -Thookul
- Best Actor in Comic Role:Harihara Mahapatra - Something Something
- Best Actor in Negative Role (Male): Samaresh Routray - Luchakali
- Best Actor in Negative Role (Female): Shweta Acharya - Luchakali & Thookul
- Best Editor: Chandra Sekhar Mishra - ACP Ranveer
- Best Dialogues: Bijay Malla -Bad Girl
- Best Cinematographer – Abhiram Mishra - Luchakali
- Best Debutant: Prakruti Mishra
- Best Child Artist: Lohitakhya Pattnaik -- Idiot: I Do Ishq Only Tumse
- Best Singer (Male): Shaan
- Best Singer (Female): Sohini Mishra
- Best Jodi: Babushan & Riya Dey - Idiot: I Do Ishq Only Tumse
