= Katha Deithili Maa Ku =

2004 Indian Oriya film

- Theatrical poster
- Directed by: Himanshu Parija
- Written by: Puri Jagannadh; Bijoy Kandoi(dialogues)
- Screenplay by: Himanshu Parija
- Produced by: Bijoy Kandoi
- Starring: Siddhanta Mahapatra; Rituparna Sengupta; Bijay Mohanty; Laboni Sarkar; Runu Parija; Satyaki Misra; Harihara Mahapara
- Cinematography: Sushant Bahinipati
- Edited by: Chandra Sekhar Mishra
- Music by: Krushna Chandra
- Distributed by: Vidisha Crafts
- Release date: 12 March 2004
- Running time: 180 min
- Country: India
- Language: Odia

Katha Deithili Maa Ku is a 2004 Oriya sports drama film directed by Himanshu Parija. The film stars Siddhanta Mahapatra and Rituparna Sengupta in the lead roles, while Bijay Mohanty and Laboni Sarkar play the supporting roles. For the first time in Oriya film history, the film was shot abroad (Japan, Montreal). It was highest grossing Odia film of 2004. It is a remake of the 2003 Telugu movie Amma Nanna O Tamila Ammayi, starring Ravi Teja and Asin.

== Plot ==
Abinash Patnaik is a state level boxer. To participate in the state championship, he leaves his wife Sumitra and son Ajay, because one condition of the contest is participants should be unmarried. He pretends to be a bachelor, and in an unavoidable circumstance, he marries another woman, Rama. Ajay, who is also a boxer, tries to unite with his stepmother and father as he had promised to his mother as she died.

== Cast ==
- Siddhanta Mahapatra as Ajay Patnaik
- Rituparna Sengupta as Seema
- Bijay Mohanty as Abinash Patnaik
- Laboni Sarkar as Sumitra Patnaik
- Runu Parija as Rama Patnaik
- Satyaki Misra as Bikram
- Harihara Mahapatra as Dhanda
- Braja Singh as Chanda
- Debu Bose as Rama's father
- Pinky Banerjee
