= Raja Jhia Sathe Heigala Bhaba =

2012 Indian Odia-language film

Raja Jhia Sange Heigala Bhaba
- Poster
- Directed by: Sudhanshu Sahu
- Written by: Sidharth Agrawal
- Produced by: Sitaram Agrawal
- Starring: Arindam Roy, Archita Sahu, Mihir Das, Mahasweta Roy
- Cinematography: B. Satish
- Edited by: Sushant Mani
- Music by: Prem Anand
- Production company: Sarthak Films
- Distributed by: Sarthak Films
- Release date: 10 June 2012
- Running time: 167 min
- Country: India
- Language: Odia
- Budget: ₹30 lakhs
- Box office: est. ₹2 crore

Raja Jhia Sange Heigala Bhaba is an Oriya drama and romance film released on 10 June 2012. Starring Arindam Roy, Archita Sahu and Mihir Das in key roles. veteran actress Mahasweta Roy being enacted the role of mother of Arindam Roy and Mihir Das played the role of father of Archita Sahu. The film is about strategic love dilemma of a rich girl with a poor boy. Arindam Roy was selected to play the lead role.

== Synopsis ==
Balia who has lost his father since early live with his mother Janaki in a slum. He has massive physical strength, but his mother always worried for Balia because of his innocence but confident on his physical strength. Janaki always wanted his son should be educated. To keep his mother satisfy, Balia join a college forcefully by threatening the college principal. There he encountered with Kandhei, daughter of an influential and powerful Pratap Choudhury. Subsequently Kandhei falls in Love with Balia because of his honesty and innocence. Their passion of love goes deep. Kandhei transformed Balia form a street rowdy to a sociable gentle man. But when Pratap and his family know the love affair of Balia and Kandhei, they threaten Balia and put him in to jail by their influences. In the meanwhile the family of Kandhei arrange marriage of her. By knowing this. Balia escapes from jail and later finds Kandhei suicides. Balia lives his rest of life with the memory of Kandhei.

== Cast ==
- Arindam Roy as Balaram Sahu (Balia)
- Archita Sahu as Kalyani (Kandhei)
- Mahashweta Roy as Janaki Sahu (Balaram's mother)
- Mihir Das as Pratap Choudhury (Kandhei's father)
- Pradyumna Lenka as Principal Bhaja Behera
- Harihara Mahapatra as Dhurandhar Behera
- Kirti Mohanty as Kalyani's mother
- Satyaki Misra as Kalyani's brother
- Subashish as Mahendra
- Ananta Misra as Professor

== Soundtrack ==
The Soundtrack album was premiered at Red FM 93.5, Bhubaneswar on 28 May 2012. The Music for the film is composed by Prem Anand.

Song	Lyrics	Singer(s)
Alapa Dekhare	Srikant Gautam	Udit Narayan, Nibedita
Na Matira Kandhei	Srikant Gautam	Saurin Bhatt, Nibedita
Ichchha Huye Janha Pakhe	Srikant Gautam	Udit Narayan, Nibedita
Heigala Heigala	Srikant Gautam	Udit Narayan
Hati Pan Pan Phuss	Srikant Gautam	Vinod Rathod
Raja Jhia Tame Kana Kala	Srikant Gautam	Krishna Beura

== Review ==
The film received mixed response from critics. Incredible Orissa penned "Raja Jhia Sange Heigala Bhaba is a good film. Nicely picturised, colorful movie. But storyline is nothing new for the audience."

== Box office ==
The Film released in Raja festival along with Rangeela Toka and Love Master.

== Awards ==
  - 4th Etv Oriya Film Awards 2013
- Best Actor – Arindam Roy
- Best Director – Sudhansu Sahu

  - 4th Tarang Cine Awards 2013
- Best Supporting Role Female (Nominated)-Mahasweta Roy
- Best Actor in Negative Role Female (Nominated)- Kirty Mohanty
