= Sruti Mohapatra =

Indian disability inclusion expert and disability rights activist

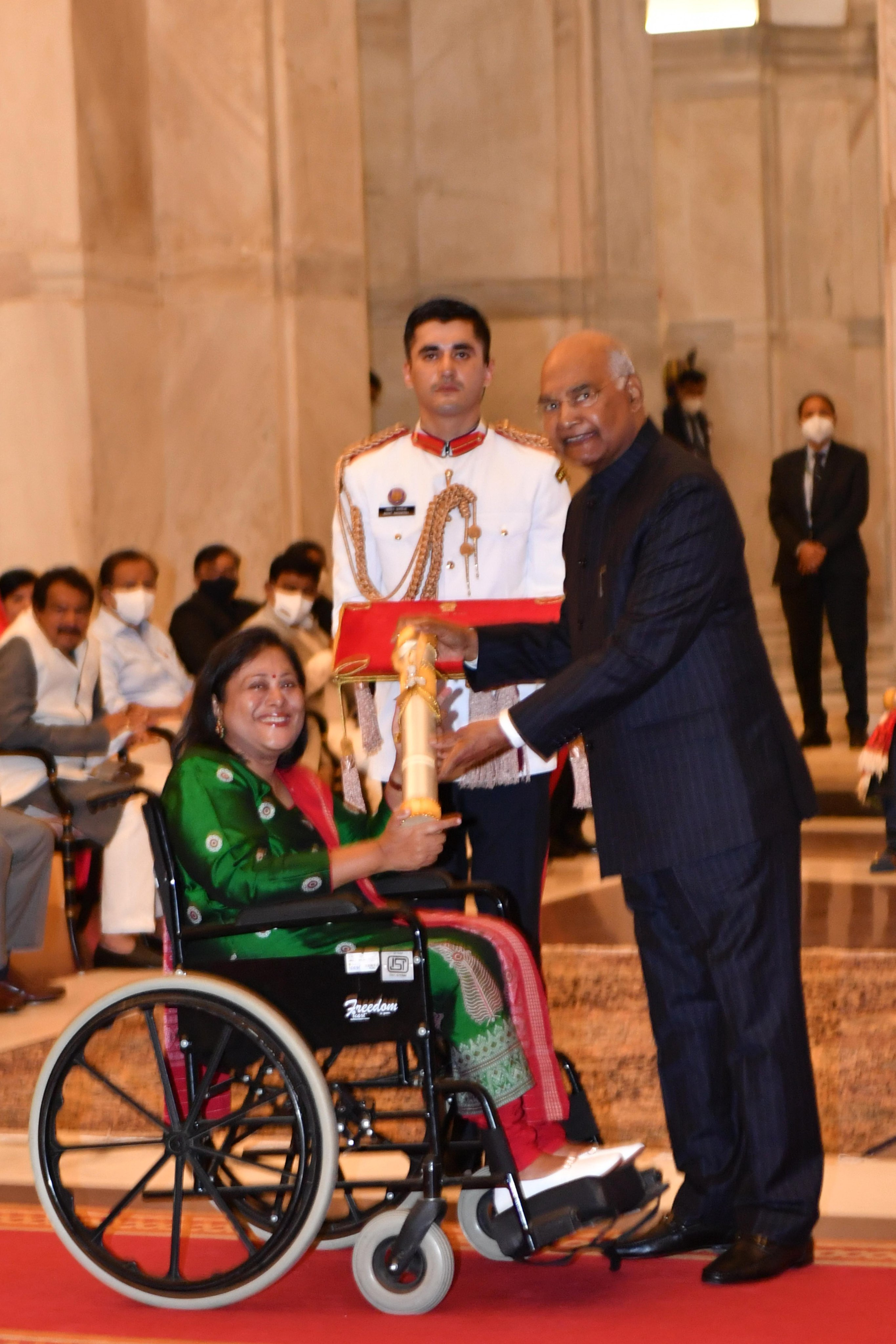
Mohapatra receives Nari Shakti Puraskar from President Ram Nath Kovind

Sruti Mohapatra (born c. 1963) is a disability inclusion expert. Her expertise is in inclusive education and inclusive disaster management and planning.

== Career ==
Sruti Mohapatra was born c. 1963. She lives in Bhubaneswar, the capital city of Odisha, India. In 1987, she wanted to become an Indian Administrative Service officer after passing the Union Public Service Commission examination but she injured her spinal cord in a car accident. Mohaptra is a wheelchair user who campaigns for disability rights. She has chaired the Odisha State Commission for the Protection of Child Rights and is a member of the National Committee on the Rights of Persons with Disabilities.

In 2009, she won a victory with other activists when the Jagannath Temple at Puri was made accessible to wheelchair users. During the COVID-19 pandemic in India, she warned that 43 per cent of disabled children in Odisha were dropping out of school.

== Awards and recognition ==
Mohaptra received the Real Heroes Award in 2010. President Ram Nath Kovind presented her with the 2021 Nari Shakti Puraskar on International Women's Day 2022.
