= Jaga Hatare Pagha =

2015 Odia film

- Directed by: Murali Krishna
- Produced by: Tarang Cine Productions
- Starring: Anubhav Mohanty; Elina Samantray; Jhilik Bhattacharya
- Production company: Tarang Cine Productions
- Release date: 2015
- Country: India
- Language: Odia

Jaga Hatare Pagha is a 2015 Odia romance action family drama film produced by Tarang Cine Productions. It stars Anubhav Mohanty and Elina Samantray in lead roles. The film is directed by Murali Krishna. It is a remake of Marathi film Lai Bhaari. The Kannada song "Life is Awesome" from the movie Male was reused in this movie as "Tarikiti Tarijham".

== Cast ==
- Anubhav Mohanty
- Elina Samantray
- Mahasweta Ray
- Ajit Das
- Buddhaditya Mohanty
- Jhilik Bhattacharjee

== Box office ==
Jaga Hatare Pagha was released during Dussehra 2015 to positive reviews. In its first day the film grossed ₹10.50 lakh (US$11,000), second day it grossed ₹5.25 lakh (US$5,500) and third day it collected ₹7 lakh (US$7,300) at the box office.
