= Chandan Kar =

Indian (Odia) actor

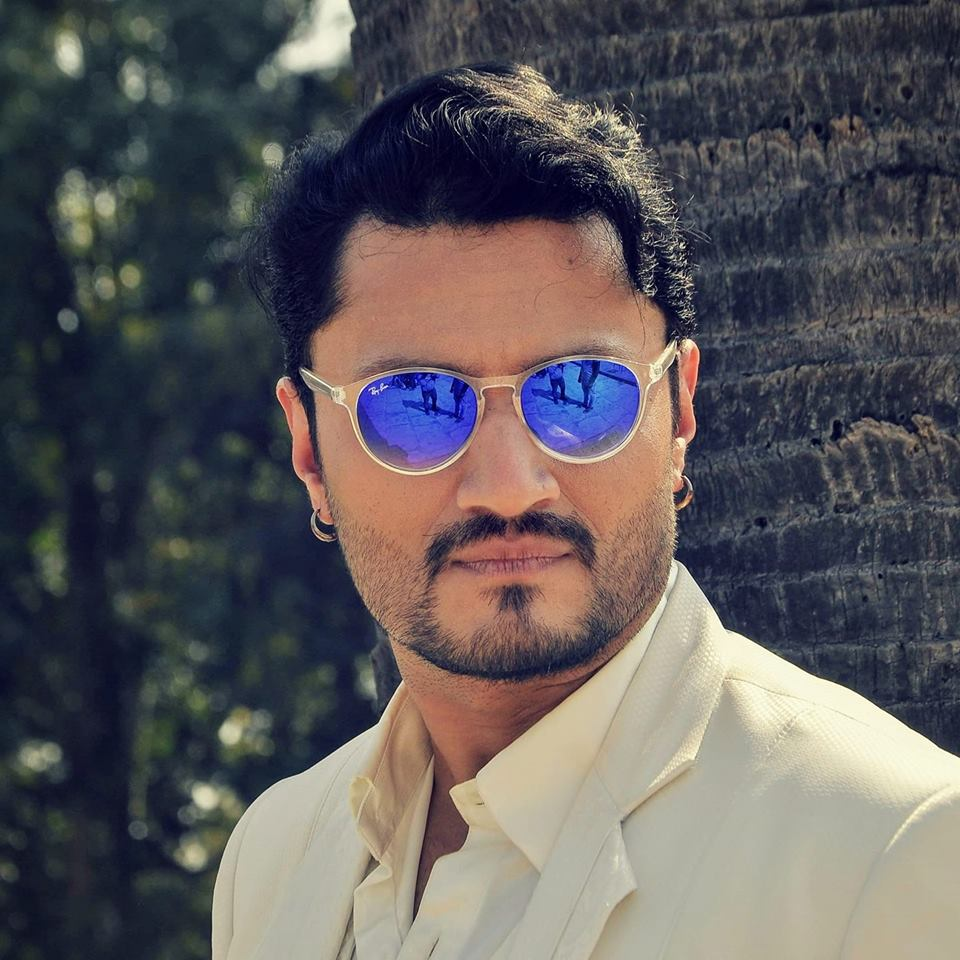
- Occupation: Actor
- Years active: 2006–present

Chandan Kar (born 16 September) is an Ollywood actor and IT Professional from the state of Odisha in India.

== Film career ==
He made his debut in the film Babu I Love You in 2006. Later that year, He acted in De Maa Shakti De . His short film Papagarbha has 50 awards and also exhibited in multiple film festivals.

== Filmography ==
Year	Title	Role	Notes
2006	Babu I Love You	Akash Patnaik	
2006	De Maa Shakti De	Rahul	
2008	Mate Ani Dela Lakhye Faguna	Prabhakar	
2008	Chati Chiri Dele Tu	Shankar	
2009	Dhire Dhire Prema Hela	Pratap	
2009	Keun Dunia Ru Asila Bandhu	Rahul	
2009	Pagala Karichi Paunji Tora	Rahul	
2009	Shani Dev	Chandan	
2010	Ae Milana Juga Jugara	Ronny	
2011	Chatire Lekhichi Tori Naa	Akash	
2011	Hero - Prem Katha	Shakti	
2011	Plot No,104	Sagar	
2013	Tanka Tate Salam	Akash	
2014	To Bata Chanhichi Rati Sara	Akash Patnaik	
2015	Rangila Baba	Akash	
2016	Excuse me.. Kana Kala Se	Chandan	
2017	Nijhum Rati Ra Sathi	Vikram	
2017	Tu Achu Ta Mu Achi	Avinash	
2017	Luchei De Mate Chhati Bhitare	Akash	
2019	To Pain Pheribi Basudha Chiri	Cheetah	
2023	Maharshi	Jayee Rajguru	
2024	Asakta		
2025	Kalapahada	TBA	

== Philanthropy ==
Kar is an active member and counselor of the NGO named Save Indian Family Foundation (SIFF) since the year 2007. Kar has adopted two tigers through the "Adopt an Animal" program of Nandankanan Zoological Park located at Bhubaneswar, Odisha. Later, Kar also joined the organization People For Animals PFA, Bhubaneswar. To promote eye donation in the State and raise awareness, Chandan has donated his eyes with the help of Drushti Daan eyebank.

Through Kar foundation, Chandan distributed ration for the needy Ollywood technicians during COVID, the foundation also works alleviation of begging and contributed for feeding stray animals.

== Awards and accreditation ==
Year	Award	Category	Film	Result
2006	Om Shree Award	Best Debut Actor - Male	Babu I Love You	Won
2006	Subham Award	Best Debut Actor - Male	Babu I Love You	Won
2009	Moon TV Award	Best Actor in Negative Role - Male	Mate Ani Dela Lakhye Faguna	Won
2021	Global Indie film Award	Best Actor Male	Papagarbha	Won
2024	Chalachitra Jagata	Best Actor - Male	Maharshi	Won
