= Pagala Premi =

- Movie poster for Pagala Premi
- Directed by: Hara Patnaik
- Written by: Sukumar
- Produced by: A. Ramesh Prasad
- Starring: Sabyasachi Mishra; Arpita Mukherjee; Sushant Lenka; Saroj Dash
- Cinematography: Niranjan Dash
- Edited by: Chandra Sekhar Mishra
- Music by: Manmatha Misra
- Distributed by: Prasad Productions
- Release date: 14 June 2007
- Country: India
- Language: Odia

Pagala Premi (transl. Crazy lover) is a 2007 Indian Odia-language romantic drama film directed by Hara Patnaik and stars Sabyasachi Mishra and Arpita Mukherjee in their debut films. This is a remake of Telugu movie Arya (2004).

The film was simultaneously shot in Bengali as Pagal Premi starring Ritwick Chakraborty, Yash Dasgupta, and Arpita.

== Plot ==
Surya and Gitanjali are smart college students. Surya falls in love with Gitanjali at first sight. Ajay is a spoilt brat and is the son of local M.L.A. Abinash. Ajay likes Gitanjali and thus proposes to her. When Gitanjali refuses, Ajay threatens that he will jump from the college roof top. Being a meek girl, Gitanjali accepts the proposal and starts dating Ajay.

Meanwhile, Surya proposes to Gitanjali. In the presence of Gitanjali's boy friend, Ajay, Gitanjali refuses. But Surya doesn't yet to give up on her as he feels that Gitanjali doesn't love Ajay truly. Surya tries to impress Gitanjali sincerely without creating a rift between the two. The film is all about how Surya tries to win Gitanjali with his attitude and positive out look.

== Cast ==
- Sabyasachi Mishra as Surya
- Arpita Mukherjee as Gitanjali
- Sukanta as Ajaya
- Pradyumna Lenka as M.L.A. Abinash
- Saroj Dash
- Chaitali
- Debjani
- Alok Roy
- Tapas Sargharia
- Nimananda
- Niranjan Pati
- Koyel Das
- Sonali
- Hara Patnaik
- Abhinayashree as an item number in "Aa Mane Anandapur"

== Production ==
Sabyasachi Mishra was offered the lead role after he was spotted by Hara Patnaik at a stage show.

== Soundtrack ==
The songs were composed by Manmatha Misra, who reused all the songs from the original.

No.	Title	Singer(s)	Length
1.	"Aa Mane Anandpur"	Tapu Mishra, Hara Patnaik
2.	"Feel My Love"	Kumar Bapi
3.	"One Side Love"	T. Souri, Manmath Mishra
4.	"Tak Dhina Dhin"	T. Souri
5.	"Tora E Hasare Aji"	Kumar Bapi
6.	"You Know"	T. Srinu

== Accolades ==
Sabyasachi Mishra won the Best Actor Award from the Orissa State Film Awards in 2007.
