= Babu I Love You =

- Poster
- Directed by: sunil Kumar Naik
- Written by: Soumya Ranjan Patnaik
- Produced by: Soumya Ranjan Patnaik; Ajit Mishra
- Starring: Siddhant; Anu Chowdhury; Archita; Chandan; Bijay Mohanty
- Cinematography: S. Ranjan; Samba Shiva Rao
- Edited by: Sanjay Nayak
- Music by: Malay Misra
- Production company: Balunkeswar Films
- Distributed by: Balunkeswar Films
- Release date: 2 May 2005
- Running time: 172 minutes
- Country: India
- Language: Odia

Babu I Love You is an Oriya drama and romance film released on 9 May 2005. Starring Siddhant, Chandan, Anu Chowdhury and Archita in key roles. The film is a remake of the Hindi film Teri Meherbaniyan (1985).

== Synopsis ==
Raghupati is a cruel and powerful man in the village. He kills the Jamidar of the village, occupies his palace and keeps his daughter Arati under terror. Also keeps Jagu as a slave, because Jagu's father exchange him against the loan he takes from Raghupati. Arati and Jagu as are in the same fate love each other. Raghupati with his aids Raghsb and Rajaram exploits and rules the poor people of the village. One day a forest officer Akash comes to the village to look after nearby forest. He meets Bijuli by an accident and both falls in love each other. Gradually due his noble qualities, Akash becomes the ideal voice of the village. Akash counters and tries to stop the illegal activities the trio Raghupati, Raghab and Rajaram.

One day Akash goes to the town to attend head office. Before leaving, he asks his faithful dog to guard Bijuli. But Bijuli tires of the dog's constant attention and locks him up. The trio Raghpati, Raghab and Rajaram tries to rape Bijuli. To save herself from rape, Bijuli suicides by stabbing herself. An enraged and heartbroken Akash lashes the dog for failing to guard Bijli, but Arati and Jagu holds back, telling him that Bijuli herself locked the dog up. Eventually Akash brutally murdered by the trio and Jagu falsely send to jail for the murder. But the faithful dog comes to rescue, collects the evidence that Raghupati, Raghab and Rajaram are the culprits. Finally the trio arrested. Jagu and Arati marries at last.

== Cast ==
- Siddhant as Jaganath / Jagu
- Anu Choudhury as Arati
- Archita as Bijuli
- Chandan as Akash
- Bijay Mohanty as Bijuli's father
- Raimohan Parida as Raghupati
- Jairam Samal as Rajaram
- Sunil Santuka (Papi) as Raghab
- Biju Badajena as Police Inspector
- Premanjana Parida as Jamidar (Arati's father)
- Kanta Singh as Village Lady
- Tapas Ray as Naga
- Subhranshu Sarangi as Police Inspector
- Bapi as Hotel owner
- Seema as Neuli
- Rajat as Young Akash

== Soundtrack ==
The Music for the film is composed by Manmath Misra

Song	Lyrics	Singer(s)
"Babu I Love You" (title song)	Arun Mantri	Bibhu Kishor, Ira Mohanty
"Adha Batu Chaligalu"	Arun Mantri	Md. Aziz
"Tu Daki Delu"	Arun Mantri	Ira Mohanty]
"Mana Khali Thila Kali"	Manmath Misra	Kumar Bapi, Ira Mohanty
"Pabana re Pabana"	Arun Mantri	Ira Mohanty
"Saharia Babu"	Manmath Misra	Ira Mohanty
"Apple Kha"	Sanjay Nayak	Manas Pritam, Sanghamitra

== Awards ==
- Orissa State Film Awards 2006
  - Best Actress in a supporting role ... Archita Sahu
  - Best Art Director ... Amiya Maharana
