= Mu Sapanara Soudagar =

- Directed by: Sanjay Nayak
- Written by: Sarada Prasana Panda
- Produced by: Sarada Prasana Panda
- Starring: Sabyasachi Mishra; Arindam Roy; Archita Sahu; Ajit Das; Akhila Patnaik; Mihir Das
- Cinematography: Ramani Ranjan Das
- Edited by: Sanjay Nayak
- Music by: Santiraj Khosla
- Distributed by: suvam films pvt ltd
- Release date: 2008
- Running time: 2.38 hr
- Country: India
- Language: Odia

Mu Sapanara Soudagar is a 2008 Indian Oriya film directed by Sanjay Nayak. This is the first film of Sabyasachi Mishra and Archita Sahu together. This film is inspired by Bollywood movie Agni Shakhi which itself was based on the English movie Sleeping with the Enemy. Sabyasachi(Omm) played the title character as an anti hero. Archita(Shriya) played love interested of both Omm and Chandan, which was played by Arindam Roy.

== Cast ==
- Sabyasachi Mishra as Omm
- Arindam Roy as Chandan
- Archita Sahu as Shriya
- Ajit Das as Omm's father
- Akhila Patnaik as Raja
- Bina Moharana as Omm's mother
- Mihir Das (guest appearance)
- Ommkar

== Box office ==
After the success of Dhana re rakhibu Sapatha mora, Subham films released their second venture on the occasion of Raja Festival. The movie ran for more than 100 days in theaters in Odisha.
