= Bye Bye Dubai =

- Film Poster
- Directed by: Basanta Sahoo
- Screenplay by: Basanta Sahoo
- Produced by: Akshay Parija
- Starring: Sabyasachi Mishra; Archita; Buddhaditya Mohanty; Papu Pom Pom
- Cinematography: Biraja Prasanna Kar
- Edited by: Rajesh Dash
- Music by: Bikash Das
- Release date: 2 September 2016
- Country: India
- Language: Odia

Bye Bye Dubai is a 2016 Indian Odia-language comedy drama film directed by Basanta Sahoo and produced by NRI businessman Akshay Kumar Parija. The music is released by Amara Muzik. The film did not perform as well at the box office as it was expected to.

== Cast ==
- Sabyasachi Mishra as Prem
- Archita Sahu as Saina and Nisha
- Buddhaditya Mohanty as Raj
- Papu Pom Pom
- Bijay Mohanty as Prem's father
- Jiban Panda

== Production ==
Filming for Bye Bye Dubai took place in Hyderabad, Ramoji, and Odisha, as well as Dubai, where they shot some of the film's song sequences.

== Critical reception ==
A critic from Update Odisha wrote that "The movie is an execrable comedy of horrors that plumbs the depths of stupidity and crassness. ‘Bye Bye Dubai‘, on the whole, is a plotless drag".
