= Emiti Bi Prema Hue =

- Poster
- Directed by: Nishikant Dalabehera
- Screenplay by: Nishikant Dalabehera
- Story by: Asit Das Mahapatra
- Produced by: Raman Kumar Sahu, Rajendra Rout
- Starring: Sabyasachi Mishra, Riya Dey, Mihir Das
- Cinematography: Amarjit Mohanty
- Music by: Prasant Padhi
- Production company: Shiny Creations
- Distributed by: Shiny Creations
- Release date: 10 February 2012
- Running time: 143 min
- Country: India
- Language: Odia

Emiti Bi Prema Hue is a 2012 Indian Oriya romantic drama film directed by Nishikant Dalabehera. Sabyasachi Mishra, Riya Dey and Mihir Das played the lead cast. The film was released on 10 February 2012.

== Plot ==
Surya Prakash is a mafia don leaves with wife Suchitra and assistant Kiran. When his daughter Shibani is born, to engage himself, he keeps Kiran's son Amar as her associate. Gradually the time come when Amar and Shibani are fall in love with each other. When Surya know the fact, he tires to kill Amar. By knowing this Shibani attempts to suicide. Later Surya realizes his fault and Amar and Shibani unites.

== Cast ==
- Sabyasachi Mishra as Amar
- Riya Dey as Shibani
- Mihir Das as Surya Pratap
- Aparajita Mohanty as Suchitra
- Asrumochan Mohanty as Kiran
- Jairam Samal as School teacher
- Hadu as Shubani's uncle
- Choudhury Jaiprakash Das as Hotel owner
- Lovely as item song dancer

== Soundtrack ==
The audio release function of the movie is held at Hotel Presidency, Bhubaneswar. The music for the movie was composed by Prashant Padhi.

Tracklist
No.	Title	Lyrics	Artist(s)	Length
1.	"Emiti Bi Prema Hue Title Song,"	Arun Mantri	Kumar Bapi
2.	"Ole Ole"	Mohit Chakraborty	Manas Pritam
3.	"Kiye Tate Sajeila"	Mohit Chakararty	Kumar Bapi
4.	"Mor Jawani Sola Saal"	Jatindra Nayak	Pamela Jain

== Box office ==
The film fail to impress the box office and did average business.

== Awards ==
- 24th Orissa State Film Awards
  - Best Actor – Sabyasachi Mishra
  - Best Actor in supporting role – Ashrumochan Mohanty
  - Best Child Actor - Aryan Misra
  - Special Jury Award -Mihir Das
