= Sarat Nayak =

Indian composer and singer

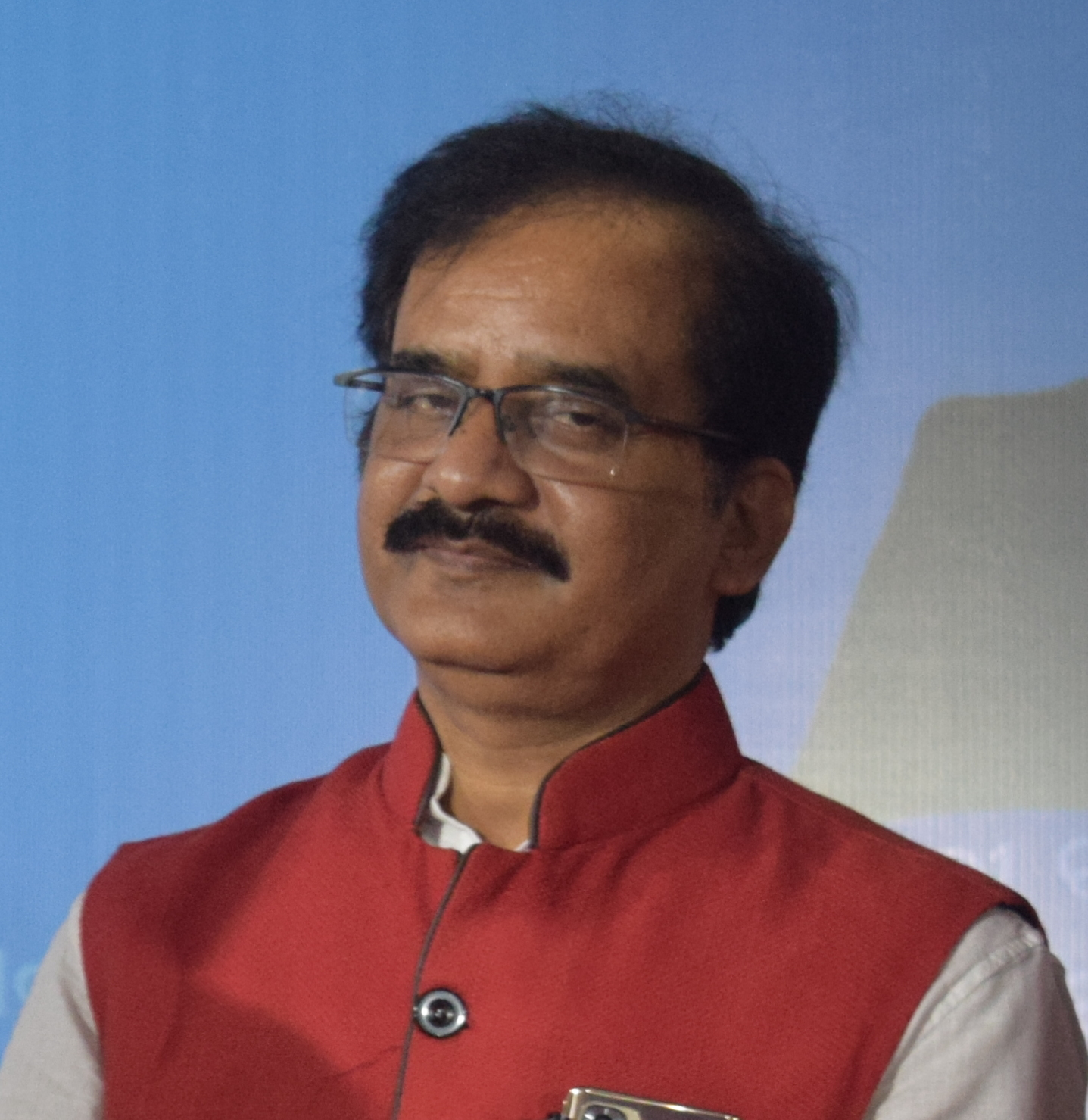

Personal details
- Born: Pattamundai, Odisha, India
- Education: Utkal University, Bhubaneswar
- Occupation: Music Director, Singer

Sarat Nayak (Odia: ଶରତ ନାୟକ) is a music composer and singer in Ollywood for the state Odisha in India.

== Life and career ==
Sarat Nayak was born in Pattamundai. He has completed Post Graduation in Oriya from Utkal University(Vanivihar), Bhubaneswar. He has composed music for different modern albums and has earned name and fame in Ollywood. He is well known among Oriyas for his devotional songs (Oriya Bhajans) and also popular for his bhajans like "Sabu Mayare Baya" and "He Narayan".

== Filmography (as music director) ==
- Chakaa Chakaa Bhaunri
- Bande Utkala Janani
- Shatru Sanghar
- Aa Janhare Lekhiba Naa
- Bad Girl

== Selected modern albums ==
- Aau Ketedina
- Chakori Jharana Luha
- Mana Rahena
- Sasura Ghara Jindabad
- Janha Raati
- Smruti
- Jibanare Thare Adhe
- E Goura

== Selected Bhajan albums ==
- Bada Dian
- Sabu Mayare Baaya
- He Narayana
- Bhaba Jamuna
- Jai Shreeram
- Papa Punya
- Tuma Pade Sarana
