= 2nd Tarang Cine Awards =

Indian film awards

The results of the 2010 2nd Tarang Cine Awards, the awards presented annually by the Tarang entertainment television channel to honor artistic and technical excellence in the Oriya language film industry of India ("Ollywood"), are as follow:

- Best Film: Sanju Aau Sanjana
- Best Director: Sudhansu Sahu
- Best Actor: Babushaan Mohanty
- Best Actress: Barsha Priyadarshini
- Best Actor in a Negative Role: Siddhanta Mahapatra
- Best Co-Actor: Mihir Das
- Best Co-actress: Ushasi Mishra
- Best Actor in a comic role: Pappu
- Best Newcomer: Bablu
- Best Screenplay: Dilip choudhury
- Cinematographer: Sanjeev Mohapatra
- Best Male Playback singer: Krishna Beura
- Best female Play back singer: Ira Mohanty
- Choreography: Sudhakar Basanta
- Lyrics: Devdas Chhotray
- Music direction: Prasanta Padhi
- Child Artiste: Sriya

== See also ==
- Ollywood films of 2010
