= Sanju Aau Sanjana =

2010 Indian Odia-language film

- Theatrical poster
- Directed by: Ashok Pati
- Written by: Rajani Ranjan
- Produced by: Lutu Mohanty
- Starring: Babushaan; Parijaat; Mihir Das; Usasi Misra; Samaresh; Pintu Nanda
- Cinematography: Sitanshu Mahapatra
- Edited by: Sukumar Mani
- Music by: Prasant Padhi
- Production company: Jay Hanuman Films
- Distributed by: Jay Hanuman Films
- Release date: 12 June 2010
- Country: India
- Language: Odia

Sanju Aau Sanjana is a 2010 Indian Odia film written and directed by Ashok Pati with dialogue by Rajani Ranjan, produced by Lutu Mohanty, and starring Babushaan, Parijaat and Mihir Das. It is a remake of the 2008 Telugu film Parugu starring Allu Arjun, Sheela, and Prakash Raj.

== Plot ==
Parsuram Paikray is an influential personality in the city. He has a dream that both of his daughters Sanjana and Anjana should marry upon his choice. Anjana falls in love with Amar and left home after getting married. Parsuram kidnapped all of Amar's friends with his goons to track his daughter. Sanju is one of Amar's friend, who get kidnapped. Sanju falls in love with Parsuram's second daughter Sanjana and both escaped from his house. Parsuram sent his goons to kill Sanju and rescue Sanjana. Sanju survives and at last marries Sanjana.

== Cast ==
- Babushaan as Sanju
- Sudarshana Sengupta (credited as Parijaat) as Sanjana
- Mihir Das as Parshuram Paikray
- Usasi Misra as Anjana
- Chakradhar Jena
- Papu Pam Pam
- Pushpa Panda
- Samaresh Routray

== Awards ==
- Best Film Award of 2010 in 2nd Tarang Cine Awards 2011
- Best Actor of 2010 in 2nd Tarang Cine Awards 2011
- Best Cinematographer of 2010 in 2nd Tarang Cine Awards 2011
- Best Dance Director of 2010 in 2nd Tarang Cine Awards 2011
