= Harihara Mahapatra =

Indian actor, comedian and politician

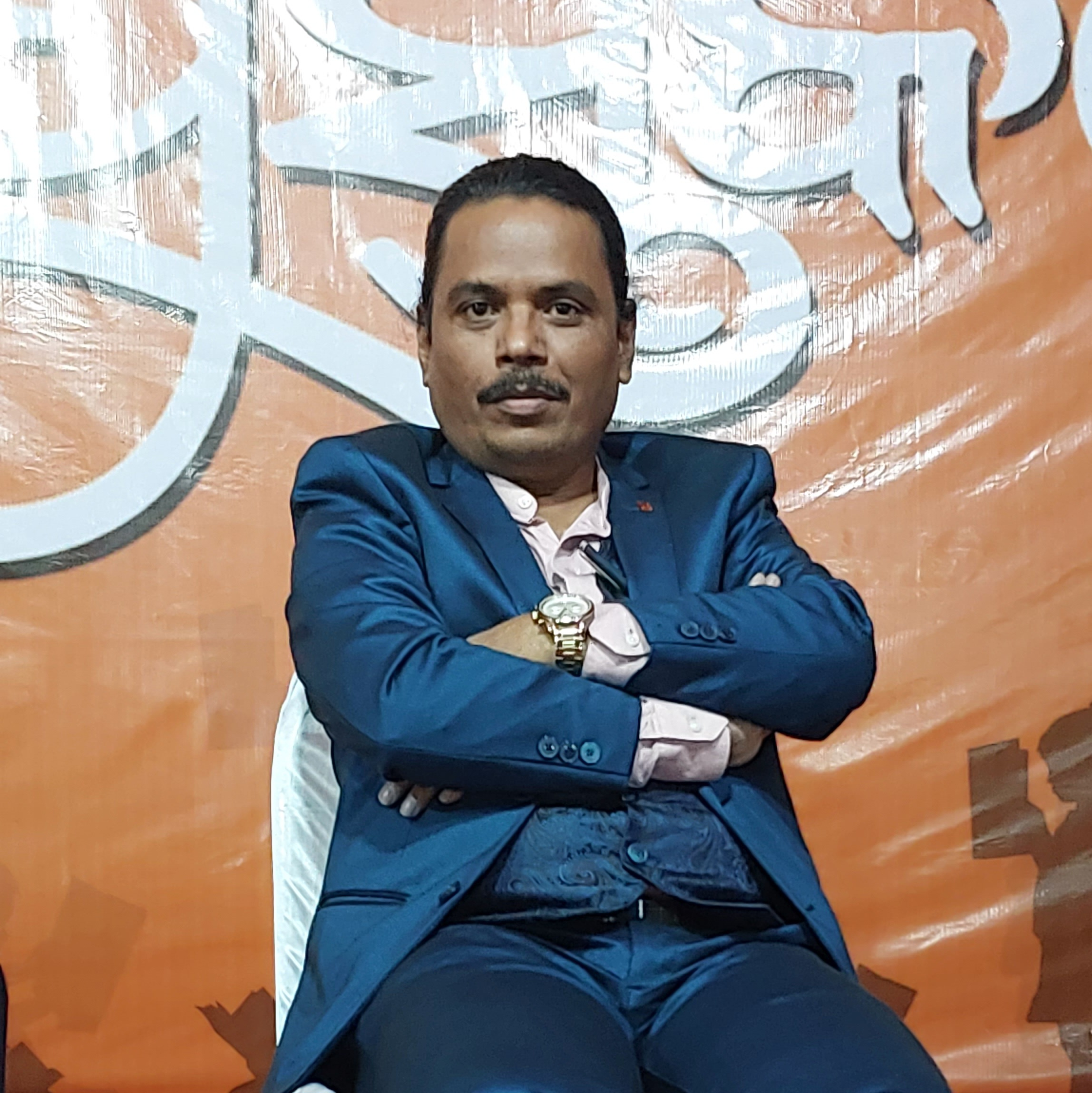
- Occupations: Actor, politician, comedian
- Years active: 1995–present
- Known for: Odia Cinema
- Notable work: Katha Deithili Maa Ku, Akhire Akhire, Pagala Karichu Tu

Harihara Mahapatra is an Indian actor, comedian and politician, who mostly works in Odia language films known as Ollywood.

== Career ==
Harihara has worked in Odia films like Dil Tate Deichi (2010), Love Dot Com, Akhire Akhire, Pagala Karichu Tu, Haata Dhari Chaaluthaa. He has also worked in award-winning children's feature film 'Sabas Biju' in 2017 and the film was screened at National Children's Film Festival, Rajasthan and International Children's Film Festival, Hyderabad. (Odia industry )

== Political career ==
Harihara had joined the state political party Bhartiya Janata Party (BJP) since 2017.

== Filmography ==
Year	Film	Role	Director	Language
2002	Sindura Nuhein Khela Ghara	Hari	Rabi Kinagi	Odia
2004	Katha Deithili Maa Ku	Chanda	Himanshu Parija	Odia
2009	Love Dot Com	Jyoti	Raqhat Quddusi	Odia
2010	Aakhi Palakare Tu	Danka	Rabindra Pradhan	Odia
2010	Dil Tate Deichi		Sanjay Nayak	Odia
2010	Prema Adhei Akshyara	Hari	Sudhakar Basanta	Odia
2012	Raja Jhia Sathe Heigala Bhaba	Dhurandhar Behera	Sudhanshu Sahu	Odia
2012	Something Something	Prem	Sudhakar Basanta	Odia
2013	Haata Dhari Chaaluthaa	Lecturer	Himansu Parija	Odia
2014	Akhire Akhire	Rahul's friend	Susant Mani	Odia
2014	Pagala Karichu Tu	Shiba's friend	Susant Mani	Odia

== Awards ==
Year	Award	Film	Category	Result
2011	2nd Etv Oriya Film Awards	Toro Moro Jodi Sundara	Best Comedian	Nominated
2013	4th Tarang Cine Awards	Something Something	Best Actor in Comic Role	Won
2015	6th Tarang Cine Awards	Daddy	Best Actor in Comic Role	Won
