= Pagala Karichu Tu =

- Directed by: Susant Mani
- Produced by: Sitaram Agrawal
- Starring: Siddhanta Mahapatra; Amlan Das; Riya Dey
- Production company: Sarthak Entertainment Pvt Ltd
- Release date: 1 October 2014
- Country: India
- Language: Odia

Pagala Karichu Tu is a 2014 Odia film under the Sarthak Films Banner, produced by Sitaram Agrawal starring Riya dey and Siddhanta Mahapatra.

== Cast ==
- Amlan Das as Shiba
- Riya Dey as Shardha
- Siddhanta Mahapatra as Bagha
- Mihir Das as KAKA
- Satyaki Mishra
- Bijay Mohanty
- Harihara Mahapatra as Shiba's friend
- Ankita Bhowmick (in item song)
- Papu Sahoo (in Dj song)

== Music ==
All Songs for this movie has been composed by Bikash Das

- Music Director - Bikash Das
- Vocals - Vinod Rathore, Babul Supriyo, Kumar Sanu, Udit Narayan, Namita Agarwal

== Track listing ==
Song	Lyrics	Singer(s)	Music
"Pagala Karichu Tu"	Srikant Gautam	Udit Narayan, Namita Agarwal	Bikash Das
"Phula Rasiare Mana Mora"	Srikant Gautam	Dibya Das	Bikash Das
"Prathama Dekharu Chhatire Jamata"	Srikant Gautam	Vinod Rathore, Namita Agarwal	Bikash Das
"Rahibaku De Hrudayare Tora"	Srikant Gautam	Kumar Sanu, Namita Agarwal	Bikash Das
"Sindura Rakta Sindura"	Srikant Gautam	Vinod Rathore, Namita Agarwal	Bikash Das
"Mote Pagala Karichu Tu"	Srikant Gautam	Udit Narayan, Namita Agarwal	Bikash Das
