= Pilata Bigidigala =

2015 Indian Odia film directed by Basant Sahoo

- Film Poster
- Directed by: Basant Sahoo
- Screenplay by: Basant Sahoo
- Story by: Rajani Ranjan
- Produced by: Pooja Bharalawala
- Starring: Sabyasachi Mishra; Archita Sahu; Papu Pom Pom
- Cinematography: Biraja Prasanna Kar
- Edited by: Rajesh Dash
- Music by: Prem Anand
- Production company: Saurav Entertainments
- Release date: 14 August 2015
- Country: India
- Language: Odia
- Budget: 60Lakhs

Pilata Bigidigala is a 2015 Indian Odia romantic comedy film directed by Basant Sahoo and produced by Pooja Bharalawala. Its music was directed by Prem Anand. The film is a remake of the Punjabi film Carry On Jatta, which was inspired by the Malayalam film Chakkikotha Chankaran.

== Plot ==
Buggi is a happy-go-lucky guy who lives with his father, Advocate Chaturbhuja Mohanty, his brother, and sister-in-law. He is friends with Twiter, who lives with his father Sub-inspector Durjyodhan Sahoo.

He meets Nisha at his friend Akash's marriage and falls in love with her. While trying to win her heart, Buggi lies to her, telling her he is an orphan. He proposes to her and marries her in the presence of her brother. Due to his lie, Buggi was unable to take Nisha home and so he lives in a rented house. She finds Buggi's home for rent, which creates tension for Buggi and Twiter.

To save his marriage and save himself from his family's anger, Buggi introduces Twiter as Nisha's husband. Meanwhile, Twiter marries Mithi, who comes to Buggi's home as their daughter-in-law. Buggi's family assumes Mithi is Buggi's wife, which brings more misery. Buggi explains the situation to Mithi and pleads for help.

Buggi wants to take Nisha out of his house, so he asks Twiter to escape with Mithi. This causes his family members to become angry with Nisha and throw her out of their house. This backfires when family members Buggi, Twiter, Mithi, and Nisha follow them. Seeing the danger, Buggi comes to save them. They finally know the truth from Buggi and plead forgiveness from Nisha. Twiter introduces Mithi to his father. The film ends with the title line.

== Cast ==
- Sabyasachi Mishra as Buggi
- Archita Sahu as Nisha
- Mihir Das
- Papu Pom Pom as Twiter
- Bijay Mohanty as Advocate Chaturbhuja Mohanty
- Kuna Tripathy as Sub-inspector Durjyodhan Sahu
- Jeevan Panda
- Shelly Mishra
- Birendra Ku Mishra
- Lipsa Mishra

== Music ==
The music was composed by Prem Anand. The singers are Sabyasachi, Bibhu Kishor, Humane Sagar, Sricharan, Sohini Mishra, Sasmita Mishra, and Sanju, among others. Sabyasachi sang the title track "Pila-Taa Bigidi-Galaa".

== Soundtrack ==
Five tunes made up the soundtrack:

- Nisa Nisa
- Pilata Bigidigala
- Bomata Phuti Gala Re
- Hatara Mehendi
- Nauty Nauty
