= Kebe Tume Nahan Kebe Mu Nahin =

2012 Indian Odia-language film

Kebe Tame Naahan Kebe Mun Naahin
- Poster
- Directed by: Chakradhar Sahu
- Screenplay by: Ranjan Das
- Story by: Chakradhar Sahu
- Produced by: Chakradhar Sahu
- Starring: Sabyasachi Mishra, Archita Sahu, Manoj Mishra
- Cinematography: Prasantanu Mohapatra
- Edited by: Chakradhar Sahu
- Music by: Bikash Das
- Production company: Silver Screen Productions
- Distributed by: Silver Screen Productions
- Release date: 17 February 2012
- Country: India
- Language: Odia

Kebe Tame Naahan Kebe Mun Naahin is a 2012 Indian Oriya film directed by Chakradhar Sahu starring Sabyasachi Mishra, Archita Sahu and Manoj Mishra. The film released on 17 February 2012.

== Synopsis ==
Milly Choudhury lives with her parent Sashank and Sneha in Sambalpur. An influential goon Ruturaj Panda wants to marry Milly. Sashank accepts the marriage offer in fear. But Milly flees from house and reaches Bhubaneswar. Swagat Das is an aspiring singer lives with his friend Pappu. When Swagat goes to railway station in Bhubaneswar to receive his friend's sister, receives Milly assuming her as his friend's sister in mistake. Milly suppresses her identity and lives with Swagat as Rekha. In the meantime, both Swagat and Milly falls love with each other. One day when Swagat is out of town, Milly faces an accident and loses her memory. When her parent got her news from hospital take her away to their home. While returns to Bhubaneswar, Swagat doesn't find Milly, tries to search her whereabouts. Ruturaj again tries to force Milly to marry her. But anyhow Sawagat reached the spot. by seeing Swagat, Milly returns to normal. At last Swagat and Milly unites by punishing Ruturaj

== Cast ==
- Sabyasachi Mishra as Swagat Das
- Archita Sahu as Rekha / Milli Choudhury
- Ajit Das as Sahank Choudhury
- Papu Pom Pom as Pappu (as Papu Pampam)
- Manoj Misra as Ruturaj Panda
- Bina Moharana as Sneha
- Akanksha as Roma
- Hadu as Haadu
- Salil Mitra as Film Director
- Jeeban Panda as Hotel Receptionist
- Neelamani Sahu as Milan Kumar
- Tanya as an item number
- Siba Panda as Swaraj Behera

== Production ==
=== Filming ===
To give it a fresh look, the movie was shot at the locations of Kerala and Hyderabad apart from Odisha.

== Soundtrack ==
The music for the movie was composed by Bikash Das.

Track listing
| No. | Title | Lyrics | Artist(s) | Length |
|---|---|---|---|---|
| 1. | "Sata Rutu Gala Mate Chhuin," | Arun Mantri | Udit Narayan, Mahalaxmi Iyer |
| 2. | "Mu Chulbuli Prajapati" | Nirmal Nayak | Pamela Jain |
| 3. | "Baki Achhi Aau Kichhi" | Mohit Chakraborty | Shaan |
| 4. | "O My Love" | Sujit Parija | Udit Narayan, Pamela Jain |
| 5. | "Re Mita Mo Gita" | Arun Mantri | Udit Narayan, Mahalaxmi Iyer |

== Box office ==
The film fail to impress the young mass, to which the production house made targeted audience. The film did average business.

== Awards ==
- 4th Etv Oriya Film Awards 2013
  - Best Lyricist – Mohit Chakraborty
- 23rd Orissa State Film Awards
  - Best Lyricist – Arun Mantri
  - Best Editor – Chakradhara Sahu
