= Sritam Das =

Indian (Odia) actor, director and Producer

- ଶ୍ରୀତମ ଦାସ
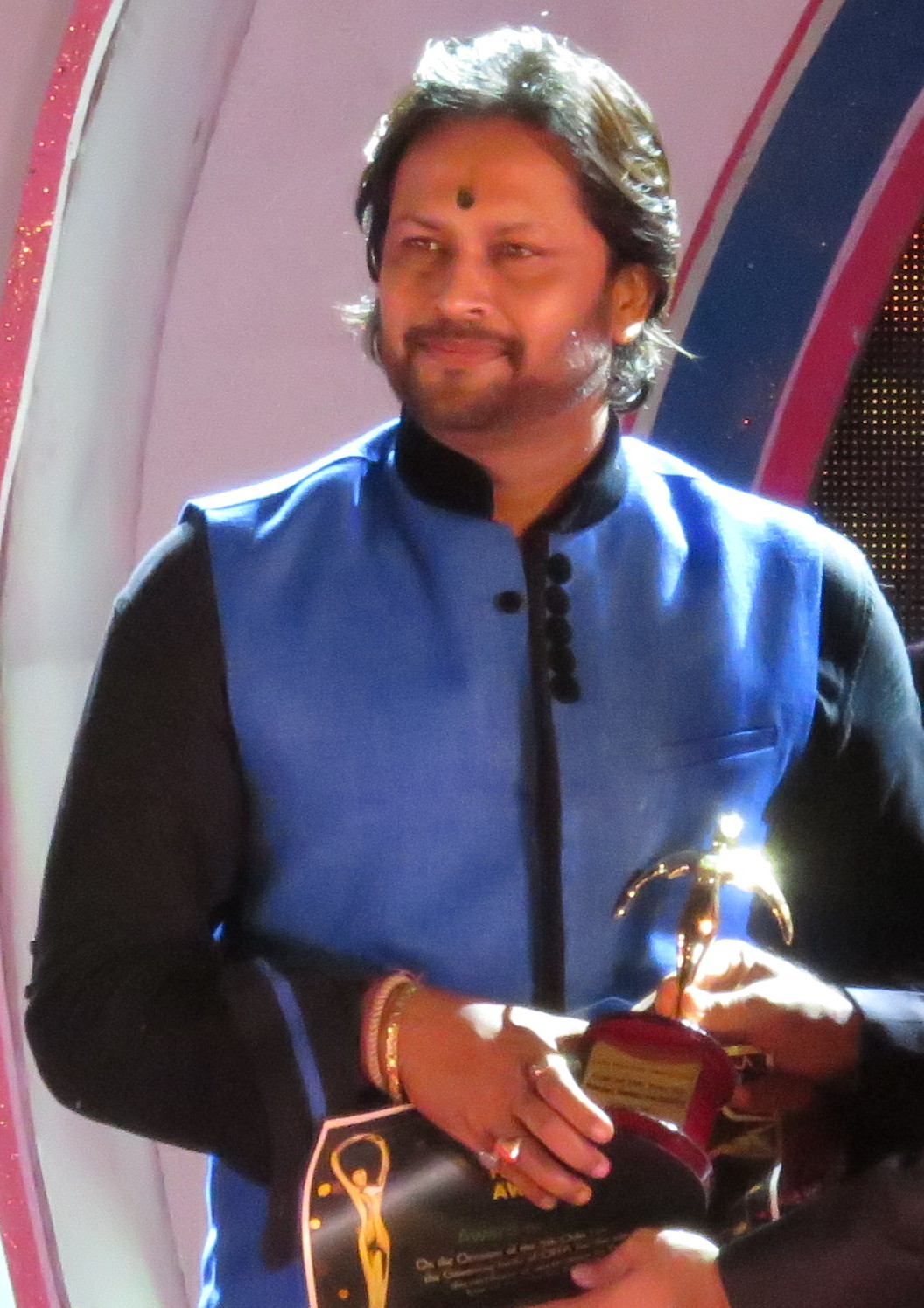
- At Bhubaneswar Odisha, 2015
- Born: Odisha, India
- Occupations: Actor, model
- Years active: 1995–present
- Spouse: Punam

Sritam Das (Odia: ଶ୍ରୀତମ ଦାସ) is an Odia actor and director. He made his Ollywood debut with the film Sabitri in 1995. In 2025, Das received the Best Supporting Actor award at the Five Star Film Awards. He is a member of the Odia film fraternity, and has served as secretary of the Odisha Cine Artistes Association.

He is a member of the Bharatiya Janata Party, which he joined in 2014. The BJP put him forward as the candidate for Mayor of Cuttack Municipal Corporation.

== Filmography ==
Year	Film	Ref.
1995	Sabitri	
1997	Ram Laxman	
1997	Jeeban Saathi	
1998	Santana	
2000	Babu Parsuram	
2000	Kasia Kapila	
2001	Dharma Debata	
2001	Baazi	
2001	Gare Sindura Dhare Luha	
2002	Wrong Number	
2002	Rahichi Rahibi Tori Paain	
2003	Bahudibe Mo Jaga Balia	
2003	Maa Mangala	
2003	Sabata Maa	
2004	Sathire	
2007	Lakhmi Pratima	
2007	Jai Jagannatha	
2010	Tu Tha Mun Jauchi Rushi	
2012	Thukul	
2013	Chowka Chhaka	
2013	Sapanara Nayika	
2014	One Way Traffic	
2015	Love You Hamesha	
2015	Maya	
2016	Jouthi Tu Seithi Mu	
2018	Diwana Heli To Pain	
2019	Golmaal Love	
2019	Babu Bhaijaan	
2021	Mahabahu Tame Kouthi Achha	
2021	Maa ra Mamata	
