= Sabyasachi Mishra =

Indian film actor

- Born: Sabyasachi Mishra; 6 October 1987 (age 39); Sambalpur, Orissa, India
- Education: Silicon University, Bhubaneswar
- Occupations: Actor; Model; Playback Singer
- Years active: 2002–2007 As an Album Actor; 2007 – Present as a Film Actor
- Spouses: Seema Mishra (m. 2008; div. 2015) Archita Sahu (m. 2021)
- Children: 1

Sabyasachi Mishra is an Indian actor known for his work in Odia Cinema. Pagala Premi was his first movie, for which he earned an Odisha State Film Award for Best Actor. Sabyasachi got his second state award for Emiti Bi Prema Hue. He won the Filmfare Awards East as best actor for Mu Eka Tumara in 2013.

Sabyasachi has signed many brand endorsement deals. He was selected as the brand ambassador for the Indian Premier League team Deccan Chargers, as well as for the Odisha Tennis Premier League and Cricket for the Blind in India, etc. to promote sports. He along with Archita Sahu were the anchors at the opening ceremony of the 2018 FIH Men's Hockey World Cup hosted at Bhubaneswar.

Sabyasachi is also involved in social work. He helped migrant workers & needy people during the COVID-19 pandemic.

== Career ==
Sabyasachi began his career by appearing in Music Videos. Saroj Satapathy introduced him in a music video for the program Rangarang of Doordarshan Odia (DD-6). Since then, he has appeared in more than 200 music videos. During this period he also appeared in Bhojpuri, Bengali, Chattishgarhi and Punjabi music videos.

Film director Hara Patnaik spotted him performing at a stage show and offered him the movie Pagala Premi. Pagala Premi was released on 14 June 2007. His critically acclaimed roles included his anti-hero character in Mu Sapanara Soudagar, the physically challenged Keun Duniaru Asila Bandhu.

In the movie Mu Eka Tumara, Sabyasachi played the character of a mute boy, for which he bagged many awards including the Filmfare Award. His 2015 release, Pilata Bigidigala was considered as one of the biggest blockbusters of the year. He starred in the 2016 movie Hela Mate Prema Jara, which was acclaimed by the public as well as critics. He continued to appear in films such as Tokata Fasigala in 2018 and in 2019 Mal Mahu Jiban Mati in 2019. He also performed playback singing for both the title songs of his movies Pilata Bigidigala and Hela Mate Prema Jara. His song Maya re Baya went viral on social media.

Sabyasachi debuted in the South Indian Film industry with the Telugu movie Neerajanam. His upcoming Telugu movie is Adi Oka Idile.

== Personal life ==
=== Family ===
Sabyasachi was born to Surendra Prasad Mishra, an IAS Officer and civil servant and Sushama Mishra, a writer. He has a brother, Soumya Kanta Mishra, who works as a telecom Engineer. He fluently speaks Odia and Telugu. He married his classmate Seema Mishra in 2008 and they divorced in 2011. In March 2021, he married his long time girlfriend fellow Odia actress Archita Sahu. Their first child, a baby boy was born on 22 January 2026.

=== Education ===
Sabyasachi is an engineer who completed his BTech in electronics and communications from the Silicon Institute of Technology, a private college in Odisha. He was also placed in Infosys but later he left to pursue his interest in film industry.

== Filmography ==
Year	Film	Role	Notes
2007	Pagala Premi	Surya	
2008	Mu Sapanara Soudagar	Omm	
2008	To Bina Bhala Lagena	Deepak	
2008	Bande Utkala Janani		
2008	Mate Ani Dela Lakhe Phaguna		
2009	Dhire Dhire Prema Hela		
2009	Pagala Karichi Paunji Tora		
2009	Kou Duniaru Asila Bandhu		
2009	Tu Mori Pain		
2009	Dream Girl	Sanju	
2009	Love Dot Com	Raj	
2009	Prem Rogi		Guest appearance
2010	Tora Mora Jodi Sundara		
2010	Megha Sabari Re Asiba Pheri		
2010	Sasura Ghara Zindabad	Raj	
2010	Dil Tate Deichi		
2010	Aakhi Palakare Tu		
2011	Chatire Lekhichi Tori Naa		
2011	Dosti		
2011	Chandini, I Miss You		
2012	Kemiti E Bandhana		
2012	Emiti Bi Prema Hue	Amar	
2012	Kebe Tume Nahan Kebe Mu Nahin	Swagat Das	
2012	Om Sai Ram		
2013	Mu Eka Tumara	Prem	
2014	Smile Please		
2015	Pilata Bigidigala	Buggi	Also playback singer
2016	Hela Mate Prema Jara		Also playback singer
2016	Bye Bye Dubai	Prem	
2016	Chhati Tale Ding Dong		
2017	Neerajanam		Telugu film
2017	Sita Ramanka Bahaghara Kali Jugare		
2018	Tokata Fasigala		Also playback singer
2018	4 Idiots		
2019	Abhimana		
2019	Maal Mahu Jibana Mati		
2019	Raktomukhi Neela		Bengali film
2020	Lucky Ra Lockdown Love Story		
2020	Dhira	Tenali Rama (voice)	Odia dubbed version
2021	Seetharamula Kalyanam Chothamu Rarandi		Telugu film
2022	Nadhir Dhinna		Tamil film
2023	Pushkara		
2025	Anantaa		
2026	Landfall †		

== Awards ==
Year	Award	Category	Role	Film/Television	Result	Ref.
2007	Odisha State Film Awards	Best Actor	Surya	Pagala Premi	Won	
2012	Odisha State Film Awards	Best Actor	Amar	Emiti Bi Prema Hue	Won	
2013	Filmfare Awards East	Best Oriya Actor	Raju	Mu Eka Tumara	Won	
2014	Odia Filmfare Award	Best Actor	Mahesh	Smile Please (2014)	Won	
2015	Tarang Cine Awards	Best Actor (Jury)	Mahesh	Smile Please (2014)	Won	
2016	Tarang Cine Awards	Best Actor (Jury)	Boogi Mahanty	Pilata Bigidi Gala	Won	
2019	Tarang Cine Utsav Award	Best Jodi (couple) with Elina Samantray		Tokata Fasigala	Won	
2020	Tarang Cine Utsav Award	Best Dramebaaz of the Year 2019		--	Won	
