= Love Station (2016 film) =

- Directed by: Ashok Pati
- Screenplay by: Ashok Pati
- Based on: Venkatadri Express
- Produced by: Tarang Cine Productions
- Starring: Babushaan Mohanty; Elina Samantray; Papu Pom Pom; Mihir Das
- Cinematography: Sitanshu Mohapatra
- Music by: Abhijit Majumdar
- Production company: Tarang Cine Productions
- Release date: June 12, 2016
- Country: India
- Language: Odia

Love Station is a 2016 Indian Odia language drama film directed by Ashok Pati. It stars Babushaan Mohanty and Elina Samantray in lead roles while Papu Pom Pom, Om sai panda and Mihir Das play supporting roles.

== Plot ==
Rudra Narayan Satapathy, a retired school headmaster, lives with his family in Rourkela. He is known for his principles and discipline and banishes family members if they make one hundred mistakes. His son, Sanjay 'Sanju' Satapathy already has ninety-nine mistakes to his name. During his ninety-ninth mistake, he comes across a "tattoo bali" (a lady with tattoo) started falling for him. For the marriage of Sanju's elder brother Sandeep, the family has to go Puri. When they reached Puri, his brother Sandeep notices a bloodstain on Sanju's T-shirt and asks the reason for it. So, Sanju on the instance of his brothers started to tell the story that how he gets back to train.

Due to circumstances, Sanju and Rani, who is also going to Puri for her own work miss their trains due to a fight. As Sanju was travelling in another coach their family did not realise he is missing. Sanju seeks help from a drunkard Auto-driver Pappu to get back into the train at Jharsuguda station. Pappu, too promises to him to help him to get the train. Coincidentally Rani too comes to him for the same help. As time passes, Jagannath tells Sanju that the train has departed from Jharsuguda and is heading to next station-Sambalpur. So, they get bound to change their target station to Sambalpur to get back into the train.

Soon, Rani gets a bus to Sambalpur, leaving Sanju alone, which infuriates him. He also orders Jagannath to deliver food to his family. Sanju reaches Sambalpur by a police van but again misses the train. Sanju catches the same bus in which rani was travelling but they are evicted from the bus due to an ensuing fight. Trapped by circumstances, Sanju and Rani together spend times with each other and started liking each other. Finally, when Sanju reaches Anugul station and trying to catch the Tapaswini express with the help of Jagannath, Rani stops him and train leaves. An infuriated Sanju slaps Rani and scolds her for ruining his life as he will never get back to train and ends up making his hundredth mistake and leave the family forever. Rani also says to him that she does not mean anything to him as he leaves her alone in the night at a lonely place and started crying. To pacify her, Sanju says sorry to him and promises not to leave him till the end of the journey. During the meantime when Rani is cleaning her clothes Sanju discovers that Rani is no one except his "tattoo bali" and readily proposed her.

Jagannath informed Sanju that Tapaswini Express is two hours late, so he and Rani reaches Cuttack station and take breakfast. While drinking coffee, Sanju sees a fight between a group of men and two persons. So he fights the men. Sanju meets and reconciles with his uncle, whom he was banished by his brother i.e. Sanju's father for making one hundred mistakes and take him to Puri station so that he could catch the train and make it look like that he was in the train all time.

During his brother's marriage, Sanju realises that his brother's bride was actually the same woman whom she was chased by those men and allowed her to escape and married her in the same temple. Rani also learns of it and soon the family does too and his mother suffers a breathing problem. The family rushes to the hospital, but as suddenly confronted by the bride's father and his men who demand to know her whereabouts. Sanju fight all of the goons who attacked his father and his brother. The bride's father reveals that Sanju was responsible for making the bride escape. Sanju's father marks it as hundredth mistake and banishes him. His uncle comes and consoles him and tells Sanju's father that family will be broken if he banishes him and others. His father realises and learns a lesson and promises them that he will never ever banish any family member ever again. Sanju reconciles with his father.

In the film epilogue, Pappu brings all their things and later tells to everyone that he feels sad for making mistakes during the film.

== Cast ==
- Babushaan as Sanju/Sanjay Satapathy
- Elina Samantray as Rani
- Papu Pom Pom as Auto Driver
- Mihir Das as Rudra Prasad Satapathy
- Om sai panda as Bunty
- Salil Mitra as Amar
- Jiban Panda as Durga Satpathy
- Pushpa Panda as Parbati
- Jogesh Jojo as servant
- Asit Pati
