= Gud Boy =

- Directed by: Jyotee Dass
- Written by: Rina Samal; Jyotee Dass; Dr Rajani Ranjan
- Story by: Perarasu
- Produced by: Hrudananda Samal; Tuna Babu
- Starring: Arindam Roy; Priya Choudhury; Ipsita Mohanty
- Music by: Baidyanath
- Distributed by: Surya Shankar Films
- Release date: 10 May 2012
- Country: India
- Language: Odia

Gud Boy is a 2012 Indian Oriya film directed by Jyotee Dass. It is the Oriya remake of the 2008 Tamil film Pazhani. The film was officially released on 10 May 2012.

== Plot ==
Gud Boy's protagonist is Raja (Arindam), a character portrayed as being of questionable character; he committed murder at ten years of age and is sentenced to fifteen years imprisonment. The film is set when Raja, a young man of twenty-five years, reintegrates into society. The film's main character is determined to secure employment inside a large mansion, a mysterious aspiration that becomes clear as the narrative progresses.

Raja proceeds to impress the owner of the residence, Mihir Das (Mihir Samantray), as well as his wife, Tulasi (Priya Choudhury). He is subsequently employed as the couple's driver, having gradually won the pair over. Due to circumstance, Raja is compelled to inform Tulasi about his commitment to his dead mother and, from that point forward, Raja perceives Tulasi as a maternal figure. The film then becomes increasingly suspenseful, as a photo of Raja's mother is revealed and the audience is shown that Tulasi appears identical to the deceased woman.

The narrative also explores the concept of the "good" boy or man. Mihir Das is a character with a respectable status in terms of social perception, possessing wealth and fame. However, the film questions the basis of such social status, as it is revealed that Das has employed criminal measures in order to attain his privileged position. Das' situation is compared against Raja's experience with crime and its consequences; however, the film then raises significant questions regarding the protagonist's history, doubts that are examined as the story unfolds.

== Cast ==
- Arindam Roy - Raja
- Priya Choudhury - Rani
- Ipsita Mohanty - Tulasi
- Mihir Das - Mihir Samantray
