= Archita Sahu =

Indian actress and model

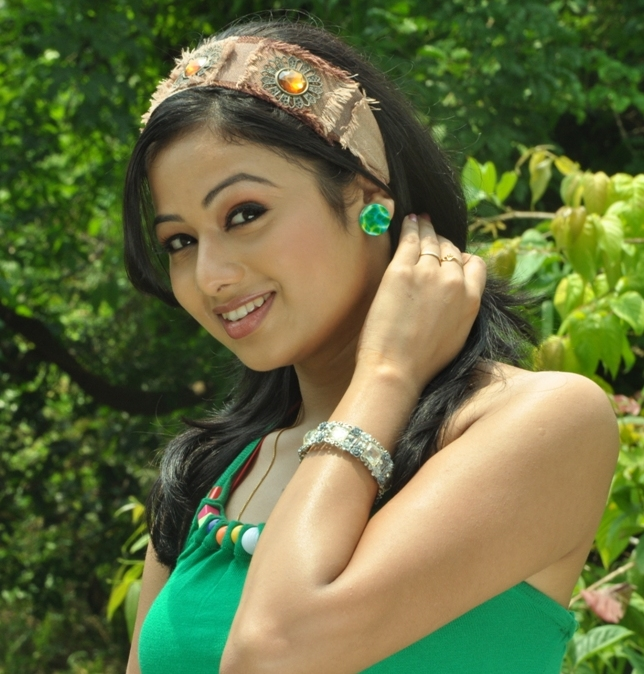
- Born: 29 June 1990 (age 36); Rourkela, Odisha, India
- Other name: Archita
- Education: Kalinga Institute of Industrial Technology
- Occupations: Actress; model
- Years active: 2005–present
- Height: 5 ft 8 in (1.73 m)
- Spouse: Sabyasachi Mishra (m. 2021)
- Children: 1

Archita Sahu (born 29 June 1990), known mononymously as Archita, is an Indian actress, model, and television personality. She is known for her work in Odia films, for which she has received four Odisha State Film Awards.

== Early life ==
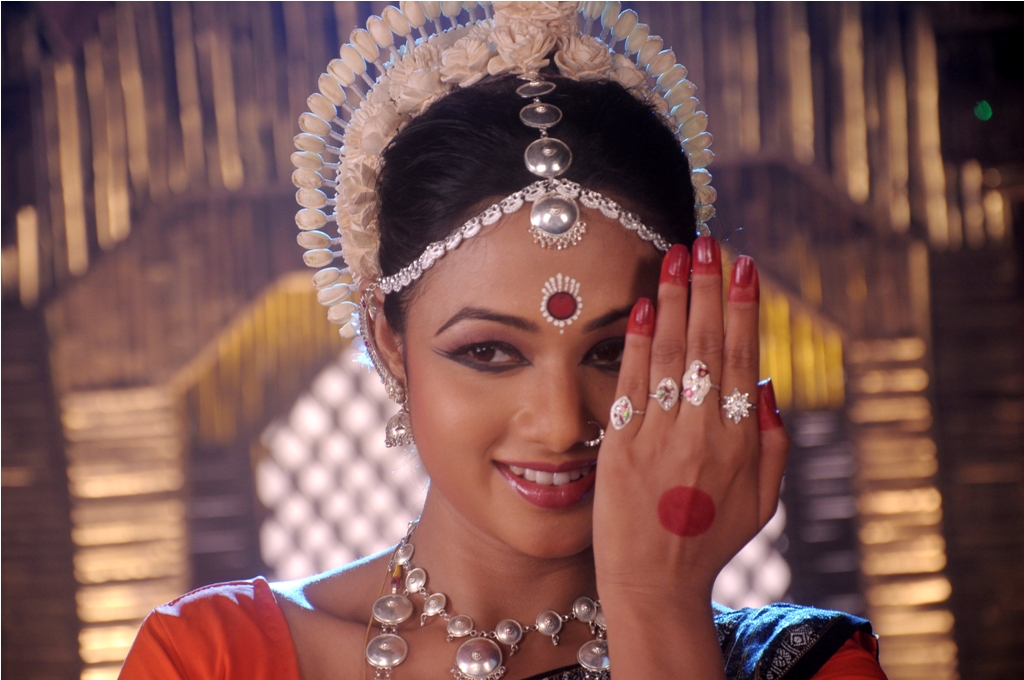
Sahu in a traditional attire

Sahu was born on 29 June in Rourkela, but grew up in Bhubaneswar. In 2011, she graduated from KIIT University with a B.Tech in Information Technology. She is trained in classical Odissi dancing, with which she gained a national scholarship for.

In 2004, she was crowned Miss Kalinga. In 2013, she was named first runner-up in Kolkata's regional Femina Miss India pageant.

== Film career ==
Despite beauty pageants being commonly seen as steppingstones to gaining mainstream film roles in Bollywood, Sahu took up roles in Odia films instead. Her first Odia film, O My Love, was released in 2005. At the Odisha State Film Awards, she was awarded Best Actress four times.

Archita made her Bengali and Hindi cinema debut in the film The Light: Swami Vivekananda, where she played Moina Bai.

=== Other work ===
Sahu is the state Ambassador of UNICEF and Government of Odisha's "Eradication of child labour". She is also the ambassador of Junior Red Cross.

She was also a part of IPL 5 as brand ambassador of Deccan Chargers.

== Personal life ==
On 1 March 2021, Sahu married fellow actor Sabyasachi Mishra in Jaipur. On 22 January 2026, she gave birth to a baby boy.

== Filmography ==
=== Films ===
Denotes films that have not yet been released

- All films are in Odia unless otherwise noted.

Year	Film	Role	Notes	Ref
2005	O My Love	Puja	credited as Archita	
2006	Babu I Love You	Bijuli	credited as Archita	
2006	De Maa Shakti De	Kajal	credited as Archita	
2007	To Bina Mo Kahani Adha	Gauri	credited as Archita	
2007	To Pain Nebi Mu Sahe Janama	Jamuna/Chumki	credited as Archita	
2007	Dhanare Rakhibu Sapatha Mora	Rupa	credited as Archita	
2008	Mu Sapanara Soudagara	Shriya	credited as Archita	
2008	Mate Ani Dela Lakhye Faguna	Asha	credited as Archita	
2009	Akashe Ki Ranga Lagila	Barsha	credited as Archita	
2009	Keun Dunia Ru Asila Bandhu	Jhumuri	credited as Archita	
2009	Pagala Karichi Paunji Tora	Puja	credited as Archita	
2010	Aalo Mora Kandhei	Puja	credited as Archita	
2010	Tora Mora Jodi Sundara	Barsha	credited as Archita	
2011	Loafer	Niharika	credited as Archita	
2011	Chocolate	Jasmin	credited as Archita	
2012	Thukul	Tithi	credited as Archita	
2012	Kebe Tume Nahan Kebe Mu Nahin	Rekha/Mili	credited as Archita	
2012	Sapath	Chaaya	credited as Archita	
2012	Raja Jhia Sange Heigala Bhaba	Kalyani/Kandhei	credited as Archita	
2013	ACP Sagarika	Sagarika Rout	credited as Archita	
2013	The Light: Swami Vivekananda	Moina Bai	Hindi / Bengali Debut	
2013	Mun Eka Tumara	Chitralekha	credited as Archita	
2014	Smile Please	Sneha	credited as Archita	
2015	Pilata Bigidigala	Nisha	credited as Archita	
2016	Hela Mate Prema Jara	Mithi	credited as Archita	
2016	Bye Bye Dubai	Saina/Nisha	credited as Archita	
2016	Chati Tale Ding Dong	Sonia	credited as Archita	
2017	Just Mahabbat	Bhumi	credited as Archita	
2017	Shiva Not Out	Bhavna	credited as Archita	
2019	Champion	Kirti/Lalpan Bibi	credited as Archita	
2019	Ajab Sanju Ra Gajab Love	Sakhi	credited as Archita	
2019	Abhiman	Pooja	credited as Archita	
2020	Durgatinashini	Nitya Das	credited as Archita	
2021	Roll No 27 – Sujata Senapati	Sujata Senapati	credited as Archita	
2021	Durgatinashini 2	Nitya Das	credited as Archita	
2022	Mahisasura	Shabana Begum	credited as Archita	
2023	Namaste Kamala Maa Go	Kamala	credited as Archita	
2025	Pade Akasha	Dr. Sruti Mohapatra	credited as Archita	
2025	Bou Buttu Bhuta	Rinki	credited as Archita	
2025	Delivery Boy 2	Pallavi	credited as Archita	

=== Television ===
Year	Title	Role	Network	Notes	Ref.
2021	Bijayini	Nitya Das	Zee Sarthak	Episode 48, Guest appearance	
2021	Laxmi Purana	Narrator	Zee Sarthak	Special appearance	

== Awards and accreditation ==
Archita has won several awards in her film career to date, including three state awards by the Government of Odisha.

- Star Entertainer of the year 2017, 9th Tarang Cine Awards 2018 for the film Shiva Not Out
- Best Actor Female, 8th Tarang Cine Awards2017 for the film Bye Bye Dubai
- Best Actor Female, 7th Tarang Cine Awards 2016 for the film Pilata Bigidigala
- Best Actress, 6th Tarang Cine Awards 2015 for the film Smile Please
- Best Actress, Oriya Film Fair Awards 2014 for the film Smile Please
- Best Actress, Odisha State Film Awards, 2013 for the film ACP sagarika
- Best Odia Actor (female), Filmfare Awards East, 2013 for the film Mu Eka Tumara
- Best Actress, Odisha State Film Awards, 2011 for the film Chocolate
- Best Actress, Odisha State Film Awards, 2009 for the film Pagala Karichi Paunji Tora
- Best supporting Actress, Odisha State Film Awards, 2006 for the film Babu I Love You
- Best Actor (female) Show Time, Puri
  - 2006 for the film De Maa Shakti De
  - 2008 for the film To Payeen Nebi Mu Sahe Janama
- Best Actress, Banichitra Award
  - 2006 for the film Babu I Love You
  - 2008 for the film To Payeen Nebi Mu Sahe Janama
  - 2009 for the film Mu Sapanara Soudagar
  - 2010 Best Actress, Tarang Cine Awards
  - 2012 – Chocolate
  - 2010 – Pagala Karichi Paunji Tora
- Best Actor (female) Etv Oriya Film Awards 2012 – Chocolate
- Best Actor (female) 2007 – To Bina Mo Kahani Adha by Omshree Awards
- Best Actor (female) 2008 – To Bina Mo Kahani Adha by UMPA
- Best Actor (female) 2009 – Mu Sapanara Soudagar by Sapatha
- Best Actor (female) 2009 – Mu Sapanara Soudagar by Chalachitra Jagat
- Best Actor (female) 2010 – Akashe Ki Ranga Lagila by Kamyab
- Best Actor (female) 2010 – Pagala Karichi Paunji Tora by Chitrapuri
- Best Actor (female) 2010 – Pagala Karichi Paunji Tora by UMPA
- Best Newcomer Award 2005 – O My Love
