= Papu Pom Pom =

Indian actor and comedian

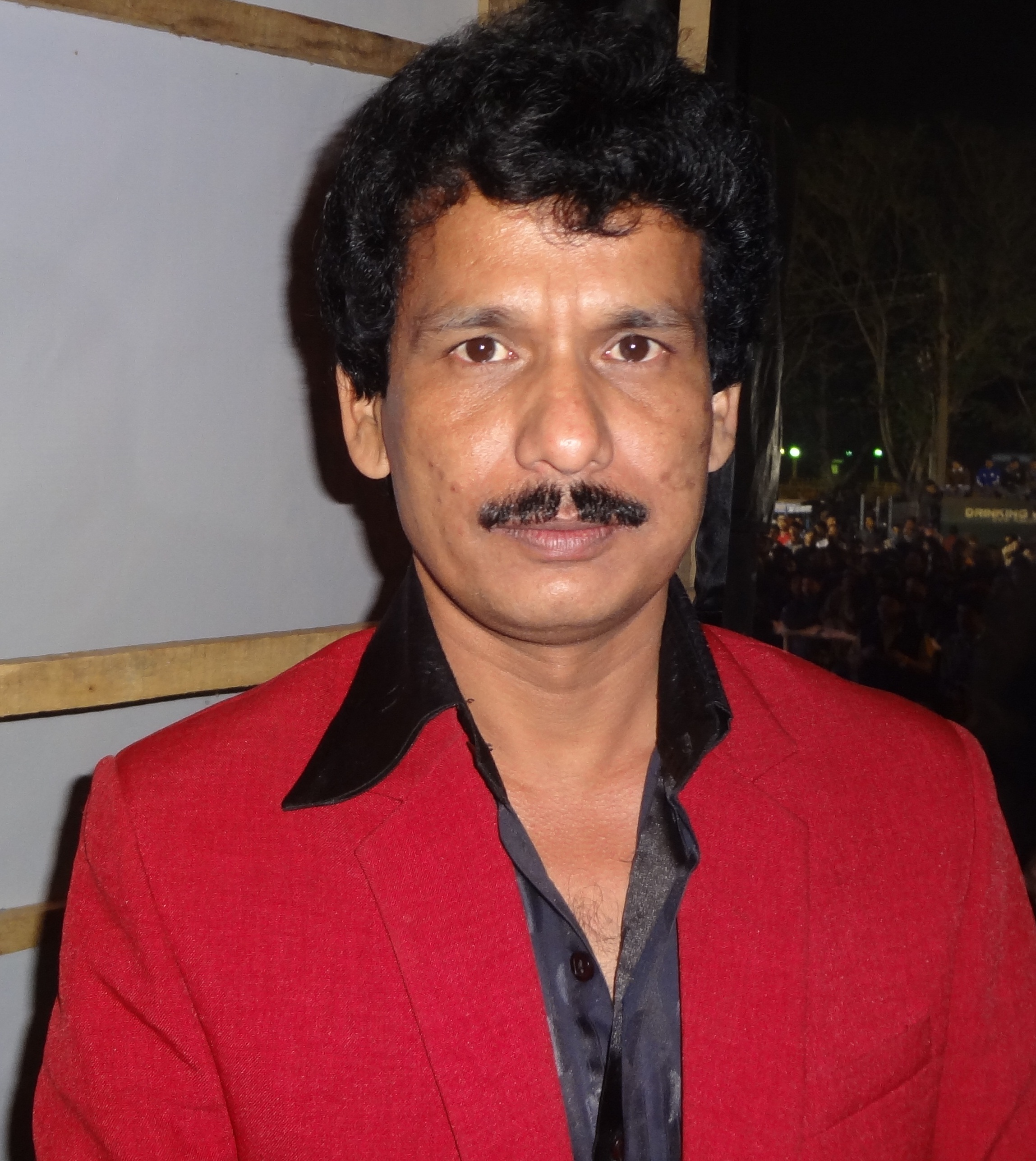
- Born: Tattwa Prakash Satapathy
- Education: Bachelor of Science (Chemistry)
- Alma mater: Udala College, North Odisha University
- Occupations: Movie, Television and director and music director Standup Comedian, Politician
- Years active: 2005–present

Tattwa Prakash Satapathy, better known by his stage name Papu Pom Pom, is an Indian film, television, Music Director, standup comedian and an Odisha Legislative Assembly candidate. Satapathy has acted in over 50 Odia movies. He was the main lead in the well-known Odia television comedy serial 'Excuse Me: Jaha Kahibi Sata Kahibi, Faltu Katha, Eita Bayata. He acted more than 500 characters in Television.

== Early life ==
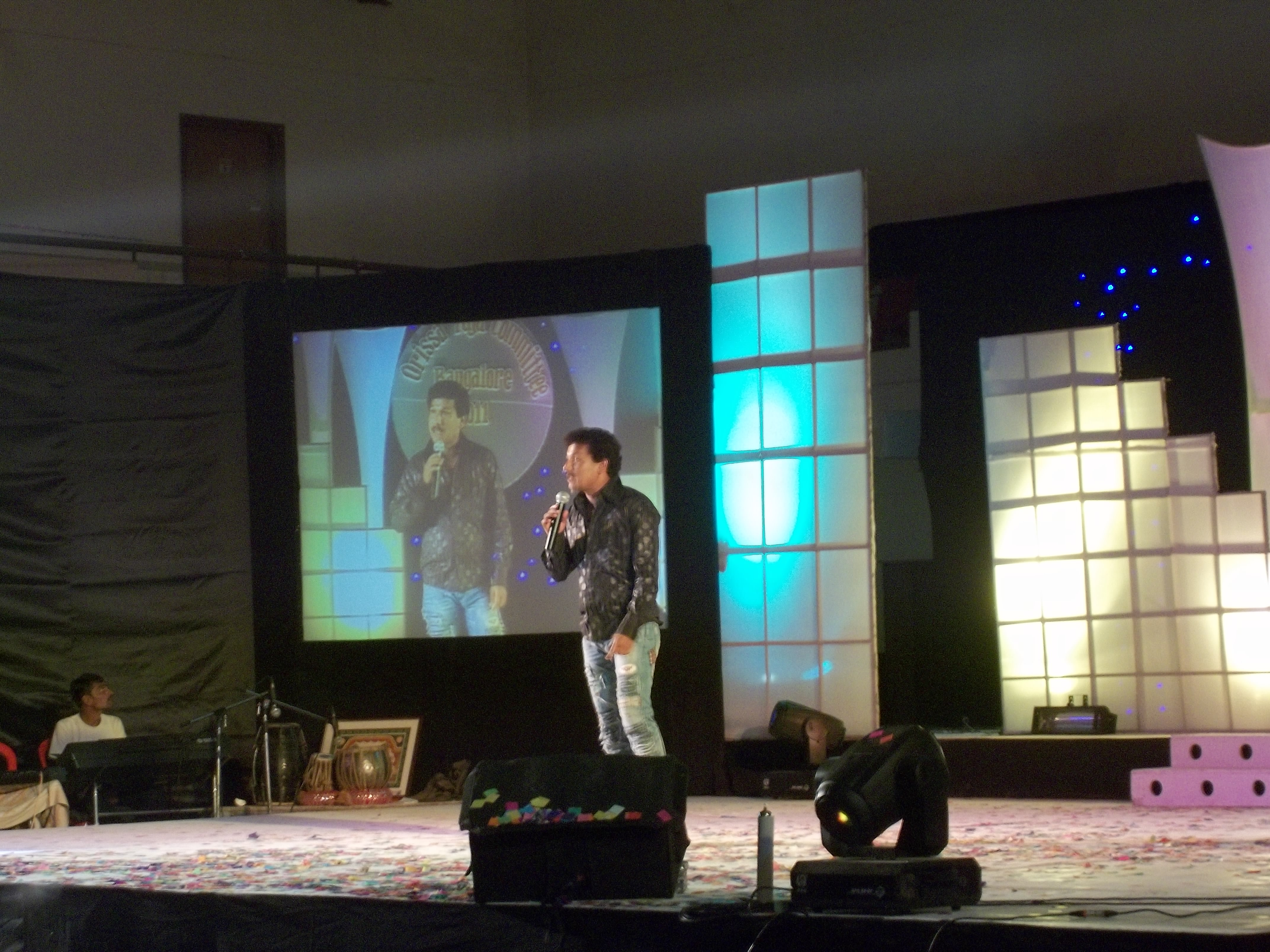
Papu Pam Pam performing standup comedy during Ganesha Puja in Bangalore in 2011

Papu Pom Pom performing stand-up comedy during State Film Awards 2014 at Utkal Mandap, Bhubaneswar, Odisha

His father is a high school headteacher and performing artist.

Satapathy has pursued a Bachelor of Science in Chemistry from Udala College, MSCB University (then North Odisha University). During those days he won the position of dramatic secretary in his college.

=== Politics ===
Satapathy joined politics and got a ticket from Biju Janata Dal for Champua Odisha Vidhan Sabha constituency for the assembly election 2014, beaten by the Former Congress Senior Leader and current independent M.L.A. candidate Mr. Sanatan Mahakud. then he left politics.

=== Production House ===
He has owned his own production house for Youtube as Papu Pom Pom Creations and recently he has acted in a special dance item number "Station Bazaar Jhiati..", which is superhit in youtube.

In 2018, Papu Pom Pom announced his new film titled Chirkut. This film is being made under the banner of Akshay Kumar Parija production. The movie has featured several new faces as well as experienced actors. Chirkut stars Arojeet, Ananya, Krupasindhu, Samskriti, Deepak Tripathy, Harita, Siddarth, Aravind Jena, Sonu and Ayushi. This time, Papu will not be featured as the comedian, but as a talented director cum music director. In an announcement ceremony along with producer Akshay Kumar Parija, all the cast and crew of the film were present in a city hotel. Papu remained out of sight in media for over a year due to illness.

== Filmography ==
Following is the filmography of Papu Pom Pom.

Year	Film	Role	Notes
2005	Tu Mo Akhiira Tara	Papu	
2005	Prathama Prema	Papu	
2006	De Maa Shakti De	Makara	
2010	Aakhi Palakare Tu	Papu	
2010	To Akhire Min	Gaura	
2010	Sanju Aau Sanjana	Sanju's friend	
2010	Megha Sabari Re Asiba Pheri	Pappu	
2010	Diwana	Pappu	
2011	Most Wanted	Computer Behera	
2011	Chatire Lekhichi Tori Naa	Lalu	
2011	Tu Mo Girlfriend	Shabu	
2011	Balunga Toka	Babli	
2012	Kebe Tume Nahan Kebe Mu Nahin	Pappu	
2012	Rangila Toka	Shibu Pradhan	Lead role
2013	Chauka Chhaka	Bula	Parallel Lead
2013	ACP Sagarika	Inspector Jena	
2014	Ameta Toka Sandha Marka		Lead Role
2015	Pilata Bigidigala	Twitter	
2015	Aashiq	Pappu Dada	
2016	Tu Kahibu Na Mu	Ashok	
2016	Love Station	Auto Driver	
2018	4 Idiots		
2018	Sundergarh Ra Salman Khan	Tingeshwar Acharya (Tinga Nona)	
2018	Tokata Fasigala	Radhe	
2018	Paglu		
2019	Chirkut Film		Director
2021	Hello Ravan		Director
2022	Mr Kanheiya	kanhu	Lead Role
