= List of Odia films of the 2000s =

A list of films produced by the Ollywood film industry based in Bhubaneswar and Cuttack in the 2000s:

Title	Director	Cast	Genre	Notes
2000
'Mana Rahigala Tumari Thare	Sanjay Nayak	Siddhanta Mahapatra, Anu Chowdhury, Jyoti Misra		
Tu Mo Akhira Tara	Sanjay Nayak	Siddhanta Mahapatra, Nikita Barsa Priyadarshini		
Sagar Ganga	Raju Misra	Anoop Misra, Rachana Banerjee		
Pritsodha Apradha Nuhe	Binod Nanda	Uttam Mohanty, Bijay Mohanty		
Kashia Kapila	Jitendra Mohapatra	Bijay Mohanty, Ashrumochan Mohanty		
Dharam Sahile Hela	Mohammad Mohsin	Siddhanta Mahapatra, Rachana Banerjee		
Laxmi Pratima	Mohammad Mohsin	Siddhanta Mahapatra, Rachana Banerjee		
Raja	Snehasis Chakraborty	Rachana Banerjee, Mithun Chakraborty		
Cooli	Swapan Saha	Mithun Chakraborty, Abhishek Chattopadhyay	Romance	
Suna Harini	Himanshu Parija	Siddhanta Mahapatra, Rachana Banerjee, Jairam Samal		
Kandhei Akhire Luha	Ravi Kinagi	Siddhanta Mahapatra, Rachana Banerjee		
Bou	Sabyasachi Mohapatra	Bijay Mohanty, Maheswata Roy, Siddhanta Mahapatra, Jyoti Misra, Usasi Misra		
Ama Ghar Ama Sansar	Mohammad Mohsin	Prajukta Kulkarni, Bijay Mohanty		
Hari Bhai Harena	Raju Mishra	Sunil Kumar, Anu Chowdhury		
Suhaga Sindura	Hara Patnaik	Siddhanta Mahapatra, Rachana Banerjee		
2001
Magunira Sagada	Prafulla Mohanty	Ashru Mochan Mohanty, Jaya Seal	Social	National Award for Best Oriya Film (2002).
Nari Nuhen Tu Narayani	Himanshu Parija	Siddhanta Mahapatra, Diptirekha Panda, Rachana Banerjee		
Pari Mahal	Bikash Das	Siddhanta Mahapatra, MaiphusAparajita Mohanty		
Mo Kola To Jhulana	Himansu Parijaa	Siddhanta Mahapatra, Rachana Banerjee, Bijay Mohanty, Hara Patnaik		
Call Waiting		Abhaya Kumar, Leslie Tripathy		
Singha Bahini	Basant Sahu	Siddhanta Mahapatra, Rachana Banerjee, Anushree		
Dharma Debata	Bijay Bhaskar	Siddhanta Mahapatra, Bijay Mohanty, Mihir Das		
Sata Micha	Raju Misra	Sarat PujariSweta Mallik		
Baazi	Ashok Pati	Siddhanta Mahapatra, Anu Chowdhury		
Katha Rahithiba Kal Kalku	Asit Pati	Siddhanta Mahapatra		
Bapa	Prashanta Nanda	Siddhanta Mahapatra, Mama Mishra		
2002
Gare Sindura Dhare Luha	Gobind Tej	Siddhanta Mahapatra Anu Chowdhury		
Maa Pari Kie Heba	Sisir Mohan Pati	Mihir Das, Rekha Jain, Aparajita Mohanty		
Maa Mangala	Surya Misra	Siddhanta Mahapatra, Jyoti Misra		
Maa O Mamata		Anu Chowdhury, Mihir Das		
Katha Deithili Maa Ku	Himanshu Parija	Siddhanta Mahapatra, Anu Chowdhury		
Kalki Abatar	Hara Patnaik	Siddhanta Mahapatra Rachana Banerjee, Jairam Samal		
Baruda	T. L. V. Prasad	Mithun Chakraborty, Rajatava Dutta	Romance	
Baaja	A.K Bir	Ram Awana, Saroj Bhagwar, Chitra Pandey		A.K.Bir got best Children filmaward in National Film award 2003
Gopare Badhuchu Kala Kanhei	Asit Pati	Siddhanta Mahapatra, Mihir Das		
Ziddi		Siddhanta Mahapatra, Bijay Mohanty		
Samay Chaka Re Sansaar Rath	Jitendra Mohapatra	Bijay Mohanty, Mihir Das, Aparajita Mohanty, Siddhanta Mahapatra		
Wrong Number	Bobby Islam	Jyoti Misra, Pradyumna Lenka, Pintu Nanda		
Tu Eka Am Saha Bharasa	Shakti Baral	Siddhanta Mahapatra, Jyoti Misra, Jairam Samal		
Rakhile Jadi Se Mariba Kiye	Ritesh Nayak	Anu Chowdhury, Siddhanta Mahapatra, Sadashiv Amrapurkar		
Maa kande puate pain	Asit Pati	Siddhanta Mahapatra, Jairam Samal		
Muhurta	Man Mohan Mahapatra			
Sei Jhiati	Sanjay Pathak	Siddhanta Mahapatra, Rachana Banerjee		
2003
Aw Aaakare Aa	Subash Das	Dipti Panda, Adyasa Mahapatra		
Tu Mo Manara Mita	Harnath Chakarbarty	Sabyasachi Misra		
Sarapanch Babu	Chakrapani	Siddhanta Mahapatra, Rachana Banerjee, Jairam Samal		
Je Panche Para Manda	Himanshu Parija	Siddhanta Mahapatra, Pinki Pradhan, Mihir Das		
Rakta Sindur	Hara Patnaik	Siddhanta Mahapatra		
Suna Sankhali	Ravi Kinnagi	Jeet, Mihir Das		
To akhi Mo aina		Siddhanta Mahapatra, Jyoti Misra, Hara Patnaik		
Sola Shukrabaar	Gopal Kumar Yogesh	Anita Das, Mihir Das		
Vidhata	Bishnu Datta	Siddhanta Mahapatra, Jairam Samal		
Tate Mo Rana	Sanjay Nayak	Siddhanta Mahapatra Barsa Priyadarshini, Mihir Das		
Nayaka Nuhain Khala Nayaka	Ratan Adikari	Anubhav Mohanty, Rachana Banerjee		
Soubhagyabati		Siddhanta Mahapatra, Jyoti Misra, Mihir Das		
2004
Saathire	Hara Patnaik	Anubhav Mohanty, Sritam Das, Madhumita Basu, Hara Patnaik		
Barsa My Darling	Hara Patnaik	Anubhav Mohanty, Ankita Banerjee, Hara Patnaik		
Rahichi rahibi tohri pain	Sanjay Nayak	Siddhanta Mahapatra		best music director pravanshu samantaray and Malay mishra
Surya	Haranath Chakraborty	Prasenjit, Ranjit Mallick		
Agni Parikshya	Surya Misra	Siddhanta Mahapatra, Anu Chowdhury		
Sasu Hathakadi Bhauja Bedi	Vijay Bhaskar	Bijay Mohanty, Braja singh		
Join Ra Chauka Ku Sasurara Chhaka	Baby Islam	Hari		
I Love You	Hara Patnaik	Anubhav Mohanty, Namrata Thapa		Best actor award Anubhav mohanty
Kotire Gotiye		Siddhanta Mahapatra		
Samay Hatare Dori	Nimai Ojha, Sudha	Siddhanta Mahapatra, Anu Chowdhury, Mihir Das		
Pheria Mo Suna Bhauni	Ranjita Mohanty	Mihir Das, Jina		
2005
Priya Mo Priya	Gudia Mohapatra	Anubhav Mohanty, Namrata Thapa, Bijay Mohanty		
Om Shanti Om	Prashanta Nanda	Siddhanta Mahapatra, Uttam Mohanty, Lipi		
Agnee	Swapna Shah	Prasonjeet, Rachana Banerjee		
Tu Mo Akhira Tara	Sanjay Nayak	Siddhanta Mahapatra, Barsa Priyadarshini, Kuna Tripathy		
Prathama Prema	Hara Patnaik	Anubhav Mohanty, Sugena Choudhry, Meghna Misra		
Rakhi Bhijigala Aakhi Luha Re		Siddhant Mahapatra, Rachana Banerjee, Mihir Das		
O My Love	Sanjay Nayak	Rajdip, Archita Sahu, Hari		The Best Newcomer Award to Archita in 2005
Babu I Love You	Sanjay Nayak	Chandan Kar, Archita Sahu, Anu Chowdhury		The Best Actress Award to Archita in 2006
Topae Sindura Di Topa Luha	Sanjay Nayak	Siddhanta Mahapatra, Anubhav Mohanty, Anu Chowdhury, Barsa Priyadarshini		
Babu Parsuram	Sudhanshu Sahu	Bijay Mohanty, Mihir Das, Sritam Das, Rekha Rao		
Eithhi Swarga Eithhi Narka		Siddhanta Mahapatra, Jyoti Misra, Jairam Samal		
Premi No.1	Debu Patnaik	Anubhav Mohanty, Koel Mallick, Chandini, Uttam Mohanty, Bijay Mohanty	Drama	
Bhagya Chakra	Basant Sahu	Anubhav Mohanty, Anu Chowdhury, Barsha Priyadarshini, Siddhanta Mahapatra		the film got best music director (Om Prakash Mohanty), best background male singer (Ratikant Satpathy) and best lyricist (Rajani Ranjan) in the state film award 2005-2006
Kathantara	Himanshu Khatua	Anu Choudhary, Bhaswati Basu, Rasesh Mohanty, Mamuni Mishra		Best Oriya Film in the 44th National Film Festival, India, 8 state film awards (best film, best director, best story, best cinematography, best supporting actress, best music, best audiography, best supporting actor), participated in panorama section of Kolkata international film festival, Asian film festival, Kerala international film festival, Hyderabad international film festival. Anu choudhury won best actress award in cineindia international film festival.....
Arjun	Hara Patnaik	Anubhav Mohanty, Rameswari, Gargi Mohanty, Hara Patnaik		
2006
De Maa Shakti De	Sanjay Nayak	Archita Sahu, Siddhanta Mahapatra, Jairam Samal		
Thank You Bhagban	Hara Patnaik	Anubhav Mohanty, Barsha Priyadarshini, Hara Patnaik		
Babu I Love You	Sanjay Nayak	Archita Sahu, Chandan Kar, Anu Chowdhury		
Puja Pain Phulatie	Gadadhar Puttty	Sarat Pujari, Adyasha Mohapatra, Naina Das		Adyasha Mohapatra got best child artist for this film in the State Film Award and Best Oriya film in 54th National film award
Rakhi Bandhili Mo Rakhiba Mana	Sanjay Nayak	Siddhanta Mahapatra, Anu Chowdhury		
Hasila Sansara Bhangila Kie	Sanjay Nayak	Siddhanta Mahapatra, Anu Chowdhury'Jairam Samal		
Rakate Lekhichi Naa	Himanshu Parija	Siddhanta Mahapatra, Ayesha Jhulka, Jairam Samal		
Priya Mo Asiba Pheri	Surya Misra	Rajdeep, Pintu Nanda, Meghna Misra		
Shasu Ghara Chalijibi	Basanta Sahu	Siddhanta Mahapatra, Anu Chowdhury, Mihir Das, Muna Khan, Aparajita Mohanty		This film got Best Film, Best Director, Best Writer, Best Lyricist, Best Actor, Best Actress, Best Supporting Actress, Best Female Singer, and Best Cinematographer award in Chitrapuri Golden Jubilee Awards
2007
Kalisankar	Prashanta Nanda, Basanta Sahu	Siddhanta Mahapatra, Anubhav Mohanty, Arindam, Anu Chowdhury, Ashish Vidyarthi		
Mahanayak	Debu Patnaik	Anubhav Mohanty, Koel Mallick, Rahul Dev		
E Jugara Krushna Sudama	Hara Patnaik	Uttam Mohanty, Mithun Chakraborty		
I Love My India	Sangam Biswal	Budhaditya, Namrata Thapa		
Prema Rutu Aslilare	Sanjay Nayak	Arindam Roy, Namrata Thapa		
Mo SunaPua	Jyotiprakash Das	, Mahashweta Roy, Samaresh RoutrayJyoti Mishra		
Jiwan Mrityu	Raju Misra	Amelie Panda, Mihir Das, Sunil Kumar, Lipsa Satpathy		
To Pain Nebi Mu Sahe Janama	Sanjay Nayak & Malay Misra	Archita Sahu		The Best Actress Award to Archita in 2007
Chaka Chaka Bhaurin	Subhendu Swain	Siddhanta Mahapatra, Mihir Das, Kajol Mishra		
Jai Jagannatha	Sabyasachi Mahapatra	Sadhu Meher, Jyoti Misra, Sreethan Das, Sarat Pujari		
To Bina Mo Kahani Adha	Sanjay Nayak	Anubhav Mohanty, Archita, Ajit Das, Anita Das, Rai Mohan, Debajani, Jai		
Lal Tuku Tuku Sadhaba Bahu	Sangram Biswal	Arindam Roy, Anu Chowdhury		
Rasika Nagar	Dilipa Panda	Siddhanta Mahapatra, Namrata Thapa		
Lakhmi Pratima	Mohammad Mohsin	Siddhanta Mahapatra, Rachana Banerjee, Sritam Das		
Tumaku Paruni Ta Bhuli	Chakradhar Sahu	Manoj Misra, Sunil Kumar, Anu Chowdhury, Amelie Panda		
Mu Tate Love Karuchi	Ashok Pati	Siddhanta Mahapatra, Mihir Das, Arindam, Bijay Mohanty, Uttam Mohanty, Namrata Thapa, Mamuni Misra		
Monika O My Darling	Nilamani Sahu	Rabi Misra, Mamuni Misra, Hari		
Samaya Hathare Dori	Amulya Das	Siddhanta Mahapatra, Anu choudhary, Mihir Das, Meghna Misra		
E Mana Manena	N. Padhi	Arindam, Mihir Das, Kajal, Barsha, Dushmant		
Paagal Premi	Hara Patnaik	Sabyasachi, Arpita, Saroj Das, Debjani		
Dhauli Express	Chitta Ranjan Tripathi	Siddhanta Mahapatra, Samaresh, Anu Choudhary, Kajal	A National Award winning film.	
2008
Dhanare Rakhibu Sapatha Mora	Sanjay Nayak	Anubhav Mohanty, Archita, Mihir Das, Aparajita, Priyanka Mohapatra, Jayeeram Samal		
Mu Sapanara Soudagar	Sanjaya Nayak	Sabyasachi, Arindam, Archita, Ajit		
Chaati Chiri Dele Tu..	S. K. Muralidharan	Siddhanta Mahapatra, Anubhav Mohanty, Mitti, Hara Patnaik, Bijay Mohanty		
Satya Meba Jayate	Basant Sahu	Akash Das Nayak, Bijay Mohanty, Sonali, Hadu		
Nandini I Love U	Ashok Pati	Siddhanta Mahapatra, Budhaditya		
Mate Ta Love Helare	Ashok Pati	Bijay Mohanty, Anubhav Mohanty, Bijaya, Mihir Das, Subhashree Ganguly		
Hasiba Puni Mo Suna Sansar	Ranjan Misra	Siddhanta Mahapatra, Anu Choudhary, Mihir Das, Mamuni Misra		
Munna-A Love Story	N. Padhi	Anubhav Mohanty, Dushmant, Romi, Naina Dash, Mihir Das		
To Bina Bhala Lagena	Jyoti Das	Sabyasachi Misra, Pupinder, Rupali		
Bande Utkala Janani	Suvendu Swain	Siddhanta Mahapatra, Sabyasachi Misra, Hara Patnaik, Minaketan, Smita	Drama	
Kalinga Putra	Barada Prasana Tripathy	Bijay Mohanty, Akash Das Nayak, Rachita		
Nei Jaa Re Megha Mate	S.K Murallidharan	Anubhav Mohanty, Barsha, Kajal Siddhant Mohapatra		
Mate Ani Dela Lakhye Faguna	Sanjay Nayak	Siddhanta Mahapatra, Sabyasachi Misra, Archita Sahu		
2009
Aila Re Odia Pua	Ranjan Mishra, Biswajit Mohanty	Tanmay Mishra, Sunil Kumar, Rali Nanda, Kajal Misra, Uttam Mohanty		
Dhire Dhire Prema Hela	Dilipa Panda	Sabyasachi Misra, Barsa Priyadarshini,		
Kurukshetra	Haranath Chakraborty	Mithun Chakraborty, Rachana Banerjee		
Suna Chadhei Mo Rupa Chadhei	Chandi Parija	Anubhav Mohanty, Barsha Priyadarshini, Siddhanta Mahapatra		
Pagala Karichi Paunji Tora	Sanjay Nayak	Sabyasachi Misra, Archita Sahu, Budhaditya		
Shatru Sanghar	Sudhansu Sekhar Sahu	Siddhanta Mahapatra, Akash, Rahul Dev		
Aaa Re Saathi Aa	N. Padhi	Siddhanta Mahapatra, Dushmant, Sonali Mahapatra, Payal		
Tu mori paeen-The Last Love Story	Jay Prakash Mohanty	Sabyasachi Misra, Lipi		
Dream Girl	Ashok Pati	Sabyasachi Misra, Priya Choudhary, Mihir Das, Bijay Mohanty, Aparajita Mohanty, Jairam Samal		
Mukhya Mantri	Chita Ranjan Tripathy	Siddhanta Mahapatra, Samaresh, Sonali Mahapatra, Bijay Mohanty, Ajit Das, Sabrina		
Aakashe Ki Ranga Lagila	Muralidharan	Anubhav Mohanty, Archita Sahu, Rali Nanda, Anita Das, Jairam Samal		
Love Dot Com	Raqhat Quddusi	Sabyasachi Misra, Pupinder, Megha Ghosh, Bijay Mohanty		
Abhimanyu	Sushant Mani	Anubhav Mohanty, Priya, Mihir Das, Aparajita		
Prem Rogi	Ashok Pati	Siddhanta Mahapatra, Budhaditya, Barsha Priyadarshini, Arpita Mukherjee		
