= List of Odia films of 2009 =

This is a list of films produced by the Ollywood film industry based in Bhubaneshwar and Cuttack in 2009:

== A-Z ==
Title	Director	Cast	Genre	Notes
2009
Aaa Re Saathi Aa	N. Padhi	Siddhanta Mahapatra, Dushmant, Sonali Mahapatra, Payal		
Aakashe Ki Ranga Lagila	Muralidharan	Anubhav Mohanty, Archita Sahu, Rali Nanda, Anita Das, Jairam Samal		
Abhimanyu	Sushant Mani	Anubhav Mohanty, Priya, Mihir Das, Aparajita		
Aila Re Odia Pua	Ranjan Mishra, Biswajit Mohanty	Tanmay Mishra, Sunil Kumar, Rali Nanda, Kajal Misra, Uttam Mohanty		
Akashe Ki Ranga Lagila	Muralidharan	Anubhav Mohanty, Archita Sahu, Rali Nanda, Anita Das, Jairam Samal		Producer Sarthak Music
Chup Kie Asuchi...	Biswa Bhusan Mohapatra	Jaya Biswas, Shakti Misra		
Dhire Dhire Prema Hela	Dilipa Panda	Sabyasachi Misra, Barsa Priyadarshini		
Dream Girl	Ashok Pati	Sabyasachi Misra, Priya Choudhary, Mihir Das, Bijay Mohanty, Aparajita Mohanty, Jairam Samal		
Eithhi Swarga Eithhi Narka		Siddhanta Mahapatra, Jyoti Misra, Jairam Samal		
Kurukshetra	Haranath Chakraborty	Mithun Chakraborty, Rachana Banerjee		
Love Dot Com	Raqhat Quddusi	Sabyasachi Misra, Pupinder, Megha Ghosh, Bijay Mohanty		
Mukhyamantri	Chita Ranjan Tripathy	Siddhanta Mahapatra, Samaresh, Sonali Mahapatra, Bijay Mohanty, Ajit Das, Sabrina		
Pagala Karichi Paunji Tora	Sanjay Nayak	Sabyasachi Misra, Archita Sahu, Budhaditya		
Prem Rogi	Ashok Pati	Siddhanta Mahapatra, Budhaditya, Barsha Priyadarshini, Arpita Mukherjee		
Premi No.1	Debu Patnaik	Anubhav Mohanty, Chandini, Uttam Mohanty, Bijay Mohanty	Drama	
Romeo - The Lover Boy	Hara Patnaik	Babushaan Mohanty, Lovely, Uttam Mohanty, Aparajita Mohanty, Bijay Mohanty		
Shatru Sanghar	Sudhansu Sekhar Sahu	Siddhanta Mahapatra, Akash, Rahul Dev		Asst. Director : Tripati Sahu
Suna Chadhei Mo Rupa Chadhei	Chandi Parija	Anubhav Mohanty, Barsha Priyadarshini, Siddhanta Mahapatra		
Tu mori paeen-The Last Love Story	Jay Prakash Mohanty	Sabyasachi Misra, Lipi		
