= List of Odia films of 2008 =

This is a list of films produced by the Ollywood film industry based in Bhubaneshwar and Cuttack in 2008:

== A-Z ==
Title	Director	Cast	Genre	Notes
2008
Bande Utkala Janani	Suvendu Swain	Siddhant Mahapatra, Sabyasachi Misra, Arptia Mukherjee	Action, crime, drama	
Chaati Chiri Dele Tu..	S.K. Muralidharan	Siddhant Mahapatra, Anubhav Mohanty, Mitthi	Action	Remake of Telugu movie Sri Anjaneyam in 2004
Chatura Kau	Bibhudatta Tripathy		Animation	
Dhanare Rakhibu Sapatha Mora	Sanjay Nayak	Ajit Das, Mihir Das, Soraj Das	Drama	Remake of Hindi movie Saugandh
Hasiba Puni Mo Suna Sansar	Ranjan Misra	Siddhant Mahapatra, Anu Chowdhury, Mamuni Mishra	Action, drama, family	Assistant Directors : Tripati Sahu
I Sing, Therefore I Am!	Subrat Kumar Sahu			
Jianta Bhuta	Prashant Nanda	Manoj Mishra, Rimjhim, Minaketan	Drama	
Kalinga Putra	Barada Prasana Tripathy	Ambika, Satyaki Misra, Bijay Mohanty	Action	
Mate Ani Dela Lakhye Faguna	Sanjay Nayak	Anita Das, Mihir Das, Pradyumna Lenka	Drama	Remake of Telugu movie Okkadu
Mate Ta Love Helare	Ashok Pati	Siddhant Mahapatra, Anubhav Mohanty, Subhashree Ganguly	Action, drama, musical	
Mu Sapanara Soudagar	Sanjay Nayak	Akhila, Ajit Das, Mihir Das	Drama	Remake of Hindi film Agni Sakshi
Munna-A Love Story	N. Padhi	Anubhav Mohanty, Naina Das, Romi	Action	
Nandini I Love U	Ashok Pati	Debu Bramha, Budhaditya, Ajit Das	Action, adventure, drama, mystery	Remake of Hindi movie Dhadkan
Nei Jaa Re Megha Mate	S.K. Muralidharan	Siddhant Mahapatra, Anubhav Mohanty, Barsa Priyadarshini	Drama	Remake of Telugu movie Manasantha Nuvve
Satya Meba Jayate	Basant Sahu	Akash Dasnayak, Sonali Chakrabarti, Suresh Bal	Drama	
To Bina Bhala Lagena	Jyoti Das	Sabyasachi Mishra, Pupinder Singh, Roopali	Action, drama, musical	
