= 5th Tarang Cine Awards =

Indian film awards

The results of the 2014 5th Tarang Cine Awards, the awards presented annually by the Tarang entertainment television channel to honor artistic and technical excellence in the Oriya language film industry of India ("Ollywood"), are as follow:

- Category ...Winner ... Film
- Best Dialogues ...Bijay Malla ...Hata Dhari Chalutha
- Best Lyrics ... Arun Mantri
- Best Music Director ...Mihir Mohanty ...Rumku Jhumana
- Best Singer (Male)... Babushan ... Daha Balunga
- Best Singer (Female) ... Trupti Das
- Best Actor Negative Role (Male) ...Pritiraj ...ACP Sagarika
- Best Actress Negative Role (Female) ... Snigdha Mohanty ...Tu Mo Suna Tu Mo Heera
- Best Actor in Comic Role ...Pintu Nanda ...Deewana Deewani
- Best Debutant Actor (Male) ...Amlan Dash ... Target
- Debutant Actor (Female) ...Sambhabana Mohanty ... Mu Raja Tu Rani
- Best Child Actor ... Bhumika Dash ... Rumku Jhumana
- Best Supporting Actor (Male) ... Minaketan Das ... Diwana Diwani
- Best Supporting Actor (Female) ... Sadhana Parija ... Rumku Jhumana
- Best Director ...Susant Mani ... Mu Eka Tumara
- Best Film ...Hata Dhari Chalutha
- Best Actor (Male) ...Anubhav Mohanty ... Hata Dhari Chalutha
- Best Actor (Female) ...Archita Sahu...
