= 1st Filmfare Awards East =

Award ceremony for Bengali language films

- Date: 29 March 2014
- Site: Science City, Kolkata
- Official website: Filmfare Awards 2014

Highlights
- Best Film: Chander Pahar (Bengali), Dwaar (Assamese), Mu Eka Tumara (Odia)
- Best Critic: Shobdo; Rupkatha Noy
- Most awards: Alik Sukh (3); Shobdo (3); Rupkatha Noy (3); Goynar Baksho (3); Phoring (3); Boss (3)
- Most nominations: Alik Sukh (6)

Television coverage
- Network: Colors Tv Bangla

The 1st Filmfare Awards East ceremony, presented by the Filmfare Magazine, honoured the best Bengali language Indian films of 2013. The ceremony was held on 29 March 2014.

== Winners and nominees ==
The nominees for the 1st Filmfare Awards East were announced on 21 March 2014. The winners are listed first and highlighted in boldface.

=== Main awards ===
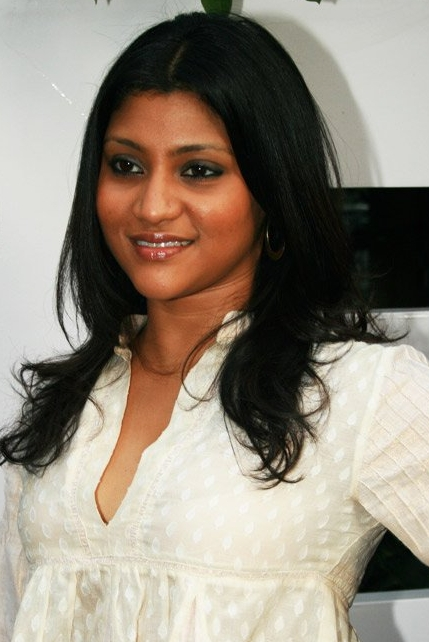
Konkona Sen Sharma, Best Actor Female – Bengali winner

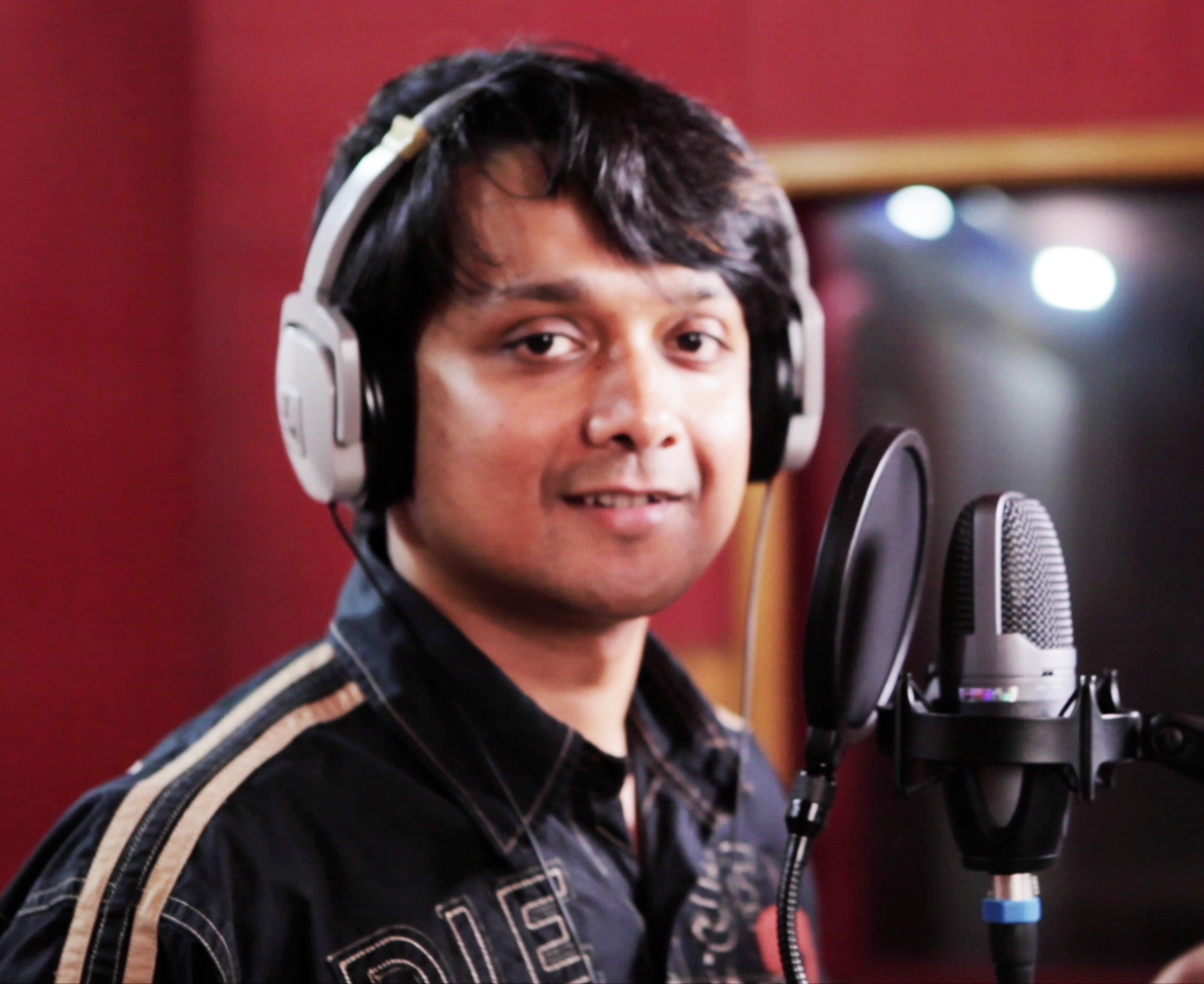
Kopil Bora, Best Actor Male – Assamese winner

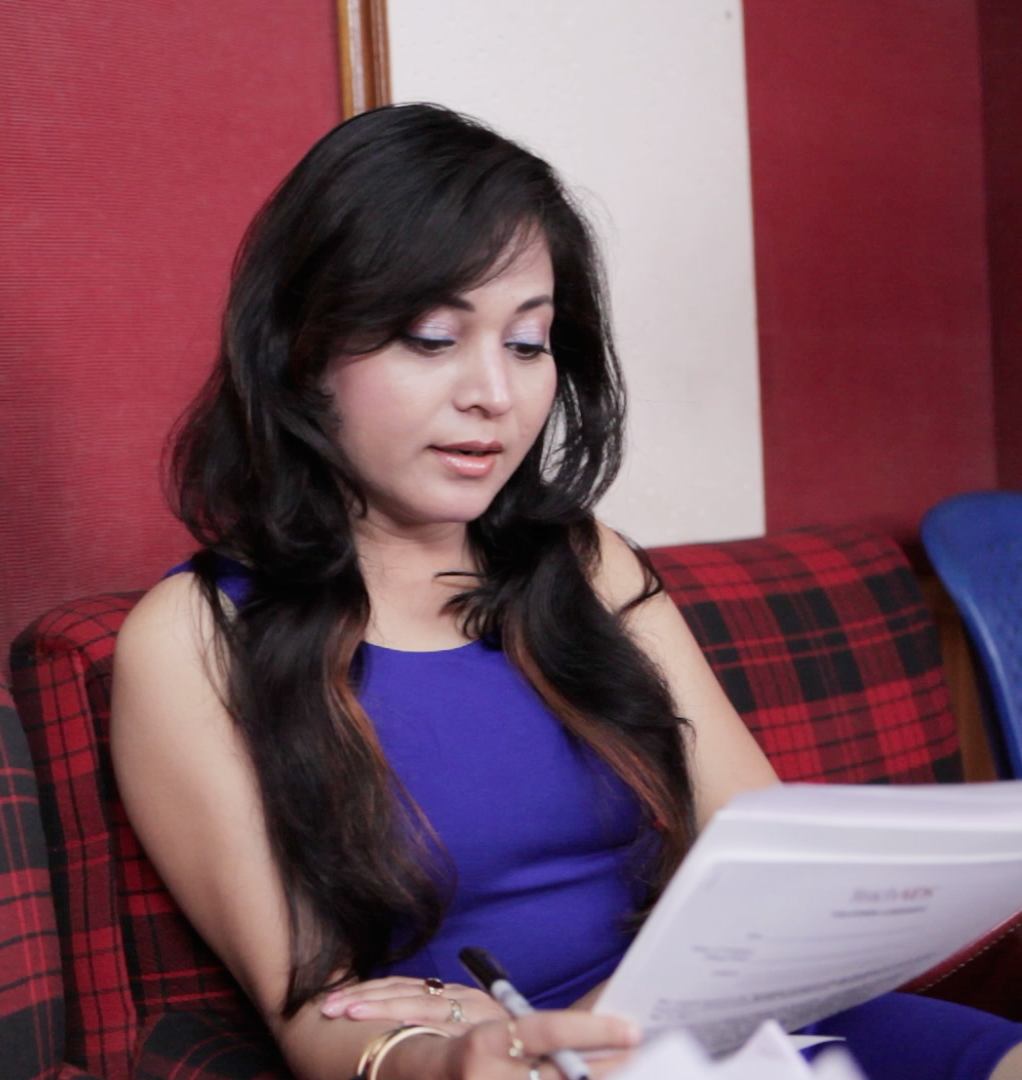
Zerifa Wahid, Best Actor Female – Assamese winner

==== Global East People's Choice Filmfare Award ====
Name	Result
**Dev**	Won
Kopil Bora	Nominated
Anubhav Mohanty	Nominated

==== Bengali cinema ====
Best Film	Best Director
**Chander Pahar**; Alik Sukh; Mishawr Rawhoshyo; Phoring; Shobdo	**Shiboprosad Mukherjee and Nandita Roy - Alik Sukh**; Aparna Sen - Goynar Baksho; Indranil Roychowdhury - Phoring; Kamaleshwar Mukherjee - Chander Pahar; Kaushik Ganguly - Shobdo
Best Actor	Best Actress
**Ritwick Chakraborty - Shobdo**; Dev - Chander Pahar; Jeet - Boss; Prosenjit Chatterjee - Mishawr Rawhoshyo; Saswata Chatterjee - Meghe Dhakha Tara	**Konkona Sen Sharma - Goynar Baksho**; Ananya Chatterjee - Meghe Dhakha Tara; Arpita Chatterjee - Satyanweshi; Rituparna Sengupta - Alik Sukh; Sohini Sarkar - Phoring
Best Supporting Actor	Best Supporting Actress
**Indraneil Sengupta - Mishawr Rawhoshyo**; Abir Chatterjee - Meghe Dhakha Tara; Kaushik Ganguly - Kangal Malsat; Saswata Chatterjee - Goynar Baksho; Paran Bandopadhyay - Proloy	**Moushumi Chatterjee - Goynar Baksho**; Locket Chatterjee - Nayika Sangbad; Sreelekha Mitra - Ashchorjyo Prodeep; Swastika Mukherjee - Maach Mishti & More; Raima Sen - Maach Mishti & More
Best Music Director	Best Lyricist
**Jeet Gannguli - Boss**; Debojyoti Mishra - Meghe Dhaka Tara; Jeet Gannguli - Rangbaaz; Indraadip Das Gupta - Hawa Bodol; Neel Dutt - Maach Mishti & More	**Anindya Chatterjee - "Raat Jaaye" - Alik Sukh**; Prosen - "Din Khon Mapa Aache" - Hawa Bodol; Sugato Guha - "Ami Akash Khola" - Aborto; Srijato - "Balir Shohor" - Mishawr Rawhoshyo; Srijit Mukherji - "Tumi Ebar" - Maach Mishti & More
Best Playback Singer - Male	Best Playback Singer - Female
**Arijit Singh - "Mon Majhi Re" - Boss**; Anindya Chatterjee - "Raat Jaaye" - Alik Sukh; Anupam Roy - "Istofa Dilam" - Nayika Sangbad; Arijit Singh - "Din Khon Mapa Aachhe" - Hawa Bodol; Arijit Singh - "Ki Kore Toke Bolbo" - Rangbaaz	**Anwesha Datta Gupta - "Saradin Aar Sara Raat" - Rupkatha Noy**; Somlata Acharyya Chowdhury - "Tumi Ebar" - Maach Mishti & More; Anwesha Datta Gupta - "Roshni Elo" - Proloy; Shreya Ghoshal - "Balir Shohor" - Mishawr Rawhoshyo; Ujjaini Mukherjee - "Ami Akash Khola" - Aborto
Best Debut Female	Best Debut Director
**Sohini Sarkar - Phoring**	**Indranil Roychowdhury - Phoring**

==== Assamese cinema ====
Best Film	Best Director
**Dwaar**; Akash Suboloi Mon; Adhyay; Momtaaj; Bhal Pabo Najanilu; Local Kung Fu	**Pulak Gogoi - Momtaaj**; Bidyut Chakravarty - Dwaar; Rhituraj Dutta - Bhal Pabo Najanilo; Arup Manna - Adhyay; Kenny Basumatary - Local Kung Fu; Manash Hazarika - Akash Suboloi Mon
Best Actor	Best Actress
**Kopil Bora - Dwaar**; Prosenjit Borah - Tumi Jodi Kuwa; Utpal Das - Durjon; Pabitra Rabha - Adhyay; Mridul Chutiya - Surjasta	**Zerifa Wahid - Dwaar**; Nishita Goswami - Mone Mur Koina Bisare; Aimee Barua - Mahasamar; Angoorlata - Surjasta; Tarulota Kutum - Adhyay

==== Odia cinema ====
Best Film	Best Director
**Mu Eka Tumara**; Haata Dhari Chaaluthaa; Mo Duniya Tu Hi Tu; Paribeni Kehi Alaga Kari	**Susant Mani - Mu Eka Tumara**; Chandi Parija - Haata Dhari Chaaluthaa; Jyotee Dass - Ashok Samrat; Sudhakar Vasant - Mo Duniya Tu Hi Tu; Sudhanshu Sahu - Paribeni Kehi Alaga Kari
Best Actor	Best Actress
**Sabyasachi Mishra - Mu Eka Tumara**; Anubhav Mohanty - Mo Duniya Tu Hi Tu; Anubhav Mohanty - Haata Dhari Chaaluthaa; Arindam Roy - Ashok Samrat; Siddhanta Mahapatra - Hari Om Hari	**Archita Sahu - Mu Eka Tumara**; Barsha Priyadarshini - Mo Duniya Tu Hi Tu; Barsha Priyadarshini - Haata Dhari Chaaluthaa; Priya Choudhury - Paribeni Kehi Alaga Kari

=== Critics' and technical awards ===
Best Actor (Critics)	Best Actress (Critics)
**Soumitra Chatterjee - Rupkatha Noy**	**Rituparna Sengupta - Alik Sukh**
Best Film (Critics)	Best Background Score
**Shobdo and Rupkatha Noy**	**Neel Adhikari - Tasher Desh**; **Prabuddha Banerjee - Phoring**
Best Choreography	Best Cinematography
**Baba Yadav - Jhinkunakur Nakkunakur - Boss**	**Soumik Haldar - Meghe Dhaka Tara**; **Indraneil Mukherjee - Phoring**
Best Production Design	Best Sound Design
**Tanmoy Chakroborty - Goynar Baksho**	**Anirban Sengupta and Dipankar Chaki - Shabdo**

=== Special awards ===
Filmfare Special Award	Lifetime Achievement Award
**Prosenjit Chatterjee**	**Suchitra Sen**; **Madhabi Mukherjee**

== Multiple nominations ==
The following films received multiple nominations.

- 6 nominations: Alik Sukh
- 5 nominations: Mishawr Rawhoshyo, Phoring, Shobdo, Meghe Dhaka Tara, Maach Mishti & More, Goynar Baksho
- 4 nominations: Boss
- 3 nominations: Chander Pahar, Rupkatha Noy, Hawa Bodol
- 2 nominations: Proloy, Nayika Sangbad, Aborto

== Multiple awards ==
The following films received multiple awards.

- 3 Wins: Alik Sukh, Shobdo, Rupkatha Noy, Goynar Baksho, Phoring, Boss
