= Arindam =

Arindam is an Indian male given name.

== Etymology ==
Power of god is Sanskrit for the man who has won all his enemies or Destroyer of enemies. It is the 2,255,512th most widely held last name worldwide.

In Eastern part of India, Arindam is a popular name among the Bengali and the Assamese folks. In Bengali, it is pronounced as "Awe-Reen-Daum".

== People ==
- Arindam Bagchi, Indian diplomat
- Arindam Banik (born 1958), businessman
- Arindam Bhattacharya, several people
- Arindam Chakrabarti, Indian philosopher
- Arindam Chaudhuri, Indian national
- Arindam Das (born 1981), Indian cricketer
- Arindam Ghosh, several people
- Arindam Guin, Indian politician and member of Trinamool Congress
- Arindam Lodh (born 1963), Indian Judge
- Arindam Mukherjee (born 1974), Indian photojournalist who works in print media
- Arindam Roy, politician and actor who works predominantly in Odia cinema
- Arindam Sil (born 1964), Indian actor, film director, and line producer
- Arindam Sinha (born 1965), Indian judge
- Arindam Malakar (born 1987), Water Scientist
