= Love Express (2018 film) =

- Directed by: Ramesh Rout
- Written by: Nirmal Nayak
- Screenplay by: Nirmal Nayak
- Produced by: Sitaram Agrawal, Namita Agrawal
- Starring: Swaraj Barik; Sunmeera
- Edited by: Rajesh Dash
- Music by: Baidyanath Dash
- Release date: 28 December 2018
- Country: India
- Language: Odia

Love Express is a 2018 Indian Odia language romantic film directed by Ramesh Rout and Produced by Sitaram Agrawal and Namita Agrawal which released in theatres on 28 December 2018. The film stars Swaraj Barik and Sunmeera in lead roles. The movie is a remake of 2012 Kannada movie Jaanu starring Yash.

== Cast ==
- Swaraj Barik
- Sunmeera Nagesh
- Bobby Mishra
- Pintu Nanda
- Salil Mitra

== Soundtrack ==
Love Express

Soundtrack album by Baidyanath Dash
- Released: 28 December 2018
- Recorded: 2018
- Genre: Feature Film Soundtrack
- Length: 22:14
- Language: Odia
- Director: Ramesh Rout
- Producers: Sitaram Agrawal, Namita Agrawal

Music is composed by Baidyanath Dash and the lyrics have been written by Nirmal Nayak and Arun Mantri.

Original Tracklist
No.	Title	Singer(s)	Length
1.	"Hai Baby Doll"	Humane Sagar, Nibedita	3:18
2.	"Tu Ete Bhala Helu Kaain"	Swayam Padhi, Nibedita	4:01
3.	"Dei Gote Gendu Phula"	Mantu Chhuria, Arpita	4:15
4.	"Elina Bhumika SivaniHai Ram"	R.S Kumar	3:34
5.	"Awara Dil Mo Kahe"	Humane Sagar, Nibedita	4:22
6.	"Goal Keeper Thile Kan Goal Hueni"	Humane Sagar, Asima Panda	3:24
Total length:			22.14

== Release ==
This Odia film hit the theatre on 28 December 2018 all over Odisha.
