= Something Something 2 =

- Theatrical release poster
- Directed by: Sudhakar Vasanth
- Written by: Nirmal Nayak
- Produced by: Anuprash Mohanty
- Starring: Anubhav Mohanty; Barsha Priyadarshini
- Music by: Prem Anand
- Production companies: Vishnupriya Arts and Graphics
- Release date: 14 June 2014
- Running time: 140 minutes
- Country: India
- Language: Odia

Something Something 2 is a 2014 Indian Odia language Comedy drama film directed by Sudhakar Vasanth and starring Anubhav Mohanty and Barsha Priyadarshini in the lead roles. It was produced under the banner of Vishnupriya Art and Graphics by Anuprash Mohanty and released on 14 June 2014. The film is sequel to 2012's Something Something and the first sequel to be produced by the Odia film industry. This movie is a remake of 2007 Kannada movie Milana. It was an average grosser Odia movie.

== Cast ==
- Anubhav Mohanty as Shree Ram
- Barsha Priyadarshini as Shayira Banu and Bhumi
- Dhirendra Nath
- Hari
- Premanidhi Majhi as Ram
- Salil Mitra

== Music ==
Singers: Udit Narayan, Human Sagar (Prema Hei Jae Re), Krishna Beaura, Abhijeet Bhatacharya, Dj Papu, Ira Mohanty.Title Track has been sung by Bollywood singer Abhijeet Bhattacharya.

No.	Title	Length
