= Shatru Sanghar =

2009 Indian Odia-language film

- Directed by: Sudhanshu Sahu
- Written by: Sudhanshu Sahu
- Produced by: Harsha Wardhan Lal
- Starring: Siddhanta Mahapatra; Akash Dasnayak; Shriya Jha; Samaapika; Mihir Das; Rahul Dev
- Music by: Sarat Nayak
- Distributed by: Pine Cask Pvt. Ltd.
- Release date: February 2009
- Country: India
- Language: Odia

Shatru Sanghar, is a 2009 Indian Odia language directed by Sudhanshu Sahu. This is Pine Cask's second film after the debacle of Anubhav Mohanty's Mahanayak. and was profitable Second highest Grossing film of 2009.

== Synopsis ==
Ajay Patnaik's main aim is to become a boxing champion. He does goes for training to Visakhapatnam, but when he return he found that his elder brother, Bijay Patnik has been missing for a month. Ajay searches every corner for his brother but gets no result. He loges a police complaint but still gets no result. At last, Bijay's corpse is found and Ajay is charged with killing him. After escape from jail with his friends, takes revenge, and punishes the culprit Nagbhusan and Nilambar.

== Cast ==
- Siddhanta Mahapatra as Bijay Patnaik
- Akash Dasnayak as Ajay
- Shriya Jha as Deepa
- Samapika Debnath as Jyoti
- Rahul Dev as Rahul
- Ashru Mochon Mohanty as Nagabhusan
- Mihir Das as Police DCP
- Bijay Mohanty as Nilambar Das
- Bobby Misra
- Prabir Sasmal
- Saheb Singh
- Sanjay Nayak
- Rudranil Chatterjee

Initially Anubhav Mohanty was signed to play the hero of the film, but he opted out due to date problems.
