= Mahanayak (disambiguation) =

Mahanayak (1926–1980) was an Indian actor.

Mahanayak may also refer to:

- Mahanayak (1984 film)
- Mahanayak (2007 film)
- Mahanayak (TV series)
