= Akashe Ki Ranga Lagila =

- Directed by: S. K. Muralidharan
- Screenplay by: Bijay Malla
- Story by: Bijay Malla
- Produced by: Sarthak Music Pvt. Ltd.
- Starring: Anubhav; Archita; Rally
- Edited by: Chandra Sekhar Mishra
- Music by: Bikas Das
- Release date: 12 June 2009
- Running time: 164 minutes
- Country: India
- Language: Odia

Akashe ki Ranga Lagila is a 2009 India Odia-drama film directed by S.K. Muralidharan. It stars Anubhav, Archita and Rally.

Mohanty received the Best Actor award at the Odisha State Film Awards. The film won the 2009 Odisha State Film Award for Best Screenplay, Best Editor and Best Art Direction. The film was produced by Sitaram Agrwal under Sarthak Music. It is a remake of the 2008 Tamil film Mahesh, Saranya Matrum Palar. It was a blockbuster Odia movie of 2009, ran for 100 days in theatres. The film's title is based on the song "Aji Akashe Ki Ranga" from Sri Lokanath (1960).

== Cast ==
- Anubhav Mohanty as Akash
- Archita Sahu as Barsha
- Rally as Chutki
- Debu Bose
- Anita Das
- Prithviraj
- Runu
- Jayee
- Hari
- Munna Khan
- Salil Mitra
- Madhumita
- Mili
- Pupun
- Raicharan
- Braja Nayak
