= Karma (2024 film) =

2024 Indian Odia-language film

- Theatrical release poster
- Directed by: Anupam Amiya Patnaik
- Written by: Manas Padhiary
- Produced by: Barsha Patnaik
- Starring: Anubhav Mohanty; Suryamayee Mohapatra; Divya Disha Mohanty; Sanoj Kumar; Manmay Dey
- Cinematography: Deepak Kumar Gharai
- Edited by: Rashmi Ranjan Dash
- Music by: Ashish Pradhan
- Production company: Amiya Patnaik Productions
- Release date: 9 October 2024 (Odisha)
- Running time: 167 minutes
- Country: India
- Language: Odia

Karma is a 2024 Indian Odia-language action-thriller film directed by Anupam Patnaik and produced by Barsha Nayak under Amiya Patnaik Productions. It stars Anubhav Mohanty as a Special Investigation Officer, accompanied by Suryamayee Mohapatra, Divya Disha Mohanty, Sanoj Kumar, Manmay Dey, Udit Guru and Choudhury Jayaprakash Das in supporting roles.

== Plot ==
Stranded in a remote graveyard, Special Investigation Officer Amar Patnaik uncovers chilling secrets, only to realize he's caught in a gripping tale of karma and fate.

== Cast ==
- Anubhav Mohanty as Amar Patnaik
- Suryamayee Mohapatra
- Divyadisha Mohanty
- Sanoj Kumar
- Manmay Dey
- Choudhury Jayaprakash Das

== Production ==
Written by Manas Padhiary and Nishant Majithia, the film was produced by Barsha Nayak. Cinematography was handled by Deepak Kumar Gharai, with editing by Rashmi Ranjan Dash. Music was composed by Ashish Pradhan.

== Release ==
Released theatrically across Odisha on 9 October 2024.

== Reception ==
The film opened to positive reports and went on to become the highest grosser Odia film of the year 2024.

== Accolades ==
Karma lyricist Durga Madhab Panda won the Odisha State Film Award for Best Lyrics for the song "Mo Hrudayata Nuhen". The film also won best entertainment film, both for 2024.
