= Love Story (2008 film) =

- Directed by: Raj Mukherjee
- Written by: Raj Mukherjee
- Produced by: Pavan Kanodia
- Starring: Angsuman Parashar; Barsha Priyadarshini
- Release date: 28 November 2008
- Country: India
- Language: Bengali

Love Story is a 2008 Bengali film, directed by Raj Mukherjee. The film featured Angsuman Parashar and Barsha Priyadarshini.

== Plot ==
The story is about Saheb and Nandini who are born in the same nursing home on the same day. But circumstances drive Saheb into the home of an untouchable dom who works in a crematorium while Nandini is brought up in an affluent home. By chance, one day Saheb comes to Nandini's house in connection with some painting job. The two fall in love and naturally, Nandini's father is not happy about it at all.
