= Sahara Jaluchi =

- Directed by: Sudhanshu Sahu
- Starring: Uttam Mohanty; Siddhanta Mahapatra; Jyoti Misra; Mihir Das; Aparajita Mohanty
- Music by: Swarup Nayak
- Release date: 1998
- Running time: 125 minutes
- Country: India
- Language: Odia

Sahara Jaluchi (transl. The city is burning) is a 1998 Indian Odia-language action film directed by Sudhanshu Sahu, starring Uttam Mohanty, Siddhanta Mahapatra, Jyoti Misra, Mihir Das, and Aparajita Mohanty. The music is released by Amara Muzik.

== Plot ==
Biraj Das is a teacher who lives with his wife, Malati, and their two children's, Priya and Seema. He is renowned for his honesty and integrity. One day, he witnessed Pappu Raula's gang murder someone in the street. His family begged him to forget about it, but he decided to inform the police. Raula's gang threatened him to keep quiet. Eventually, they killed him. His son, Priya, and his girlfriend, who was a journalist, joined forces with Raja, who wanted revenge for his brother's murder. Together, they finally killed Raula and avenged his death.

== Snippets ==
Sahara Jaluchi is Mithun Chakraborty's first Oriya movie and he does a special appearance. His appearance prompted the makers to dubbed the film into Bengali as Sahar Jolche.

== Cast ==
- Uttam Mohanty ... Biraj Das
- Siddhanta Mahapatra ... Priyabrata Das, Biraj's son
- Mihir Das ... Raju
- Rekha Jain ... Raju's sister
- Jyoti Misra ... Tanu Mahapatra
- Tandra Roy ... Malati
- Bijay Mohanty ... Pappu Raula
- Mithun Chakraborty ... Biju
- Chakradhara Jena ... Pappu's brother-in-law and henchman
- Surya Mohanty ... Sura Senapati
- Hara Patnaik ... Police Inspector
- Minaketan Das ... Police Inspector
- Sudhanshu Mohan Sahu ... Bunty Raula, Pappu's son
- Rachna Banerjee
