= To Bina Mo Kahani Adha =

2007 Oriya film

- Directed by: Sanjay Nayak
- Written by: Upendra kishore Das
- Screenplay by: Sanjay Nayak
- Produced by: Purna Chandra Das; Bijay Kumar Patra
- Starring: Anubhav; Archita
- Cinematography: Samba
- Edited by: Siba Prasad Mohanty
- Music by: Santiraj Khosla
- Production company: Omm Movies
- Distributed by: Omm Movies
- Release date: 14 June 2007
- Country: India
- Language: Odia

To Bina Mo Kahani Adha is a 2007 Oriya film directed by Sanjay Nayak starring Anubhav, Archita, and Jairam Samal.

== Plot ==
Arun, a wealthy young man, visits a village to meet a girl selected by his parents for marriage. However, in the village, he is falsely accused by the girl and imprisoned. After his release, Arun attempts to win her over, eventually succeeding in marrying her. On their fourth night together, he confesses that he manipulated her to seek revenge. Ultimately, the film concludes with a happy ending.

== Cast ==
- Anubhav as Amar
- Archita as Gauri
- Jairam Samal
- Arabinda
- Biju Badajena
- Ajit Das
- Anita Das
- Debjani
- Jeena Samal
- Chakradhar Jena
- Raimohan
- Jairam Samal

== Music ==
The music for the film was composed by Santiraj Khosla. Tracks from the film include:

Track	Singer	Lyricist
Janama Deinu Sina Deichu Sneha	Nibedita	Bijay Malla
Kholide Tora Gabhaa Gajaraa	Babul Supriyo, Nibedita	Nirmal Nayak
Mun Barasa Mun Bijuli Mun Chaiti Baa	Swansya, Nibedita	Nirmal Nayak
Sabuthu Alagaa Aama Prema Kaahan	Babul Supriyo, Nibedita	Arun Mantri
Paagala Mun Premika Mun Sapanara Banika Mun	Abhijit Misra	Arun Mantri
