= I Love You (2004 film) =

- Directed by: Hara Patnaik
- Produced by: Basant Nayak
- Starring: Anubhav Mohanty; Namrata Thapa; Bijay Mohanty; Tandra Roy; Anita Das; Hara Patnaik; Sovan Dibya Darsan
- Cinematography: Niranjan Das
- Music by: Swaroop Nayak
- Distributed by: Brajaraj Movies
- Release date: 12 February 2004
- Country: India
- Language: Odia

I Love You is a 2004 Indian Odia romance action film directed by Hara Patnaik and produced by Sanjay Nayak. A remake of Tamil film Thullatha Manamum Thullum (1999), It stars debutante Anubhav Mohanty and Mumbai based model and actress Namrata Thapa.

== Cast ==
- Anubhav Mohanty
- Namrata Thapa
- Bijoy Mohanty
- Tandra Ray
- Anita Das
- Hara Patnaik
