= Balunga Toka =

2011 Indian Odia-language film

- Theatrical poster
- Directed by: Sudhakar Basant
- Written by: Muni Patra
- Screenplay by: Sudhakara Basant
- Produced by: Prabhas Chandra Rout
- Starring: Anubhav Mohanty; Barsha Priyadarshini; Papu Pom Pom; Minaketan Das
- Cinematography: R. Bhagat Singh
- Edited by: Chandra Sekhar Mishra
- Music by: Abhijit Mazumdar
- Release date: 2 October 2011
- Running time: 157 min
- Country: India
- Language: Odia
- Budget: 75 lakhs
- Box office: est. ₹ 4 crore

Balunga Toka is a 2011 Indian Odia-language romantic drama film directed by Sudhakar Basant. The film stars Anubhav Mohanty and Barsha Priyadarshini as lead role. A remake of the 2004 Tamil-Telugu bilingual film 7G Rainbow Colony, it released on 2 October 2011. The film was commercially successful.The film score was released by Amara Muzik.

== Synopsis ==
Chiku (Anubhav Mohanty) is living with his parents and younger sister . He always involves in fights on street and not interested in studies. Due to his rough behaviour, his father always scolds him. Chiku's life changes when he meets Preeti (Barsha Priyadarshini) and falls in love with her. He got a job due to Preeti's efforts and Chiku's skill to convince people with very good way. When Preeti's mother got know the affair between chiku and preeti then she left the society and arranged the pre-planned marriage of her daughter with another guy. Preeti escapes from home to unite with Chiku. But due to some misunderstanding with Chiku, Preeti leaves Chiku and had an accident. And at the same place chiku also had an accident. Due to the accident, he losses his memory. After getting back his memory, he got to know that his father is getting beaten by some baddies. And at the same place Chiku saw Preeti is preparing for the marriage. At last and after the fight, Preeti's father feel the love and affection between Chiku and Preeti and he accepts their love.

== Cast ==
- Anubhav Mohanty as Chiku
- Barsa Priyadarshini as Preeti
- Minaketan Das as Chiku's father
- Priyanka Mahapatra as Chiku's mother
- Prativa Panda as Rocky
- Salil Mitra
- Arabinda Sadhangi as Das Babu
- Jiban Panda
- Manoj Panda
- Sambit Acharya
- Guddu Comedian
- Kalicharan
- Sudhakar Basant

== Soundtrack ==
The songs are composed by Abhijit Mazumdar. The song "Balunga Toka" is based on "Hey Vetri Velaa" from Padikkadavan.

Track listing
No.	Title	Lyrics	Singer(s)	Length
1.	"Balunga Toka"	Nirmal Nayak	Vinod Rathod	5:31
2.	"Are Re Re"	Nizam	Udit Narayan, Anjali Mishra	6:30
3.	"Tuki Sei Sapana"	Nizam	Javed Ali, Anjali Mishra	2:13
4.	"Mana Mo Ma Emiti Eka"	Nirmala Nayak	Babul Supriyo	5:26
5.	"Kichi Hau Hau Kichi Hela"	Nirmala Nayak	Babul Supriyo	3:56

== Box office ==
The film proved to be a big hit and have crossed 100 days in several theaters in Odisha. It grossed a total of ₹4 crore at the box office.

== Awards ==
- 3rd Tarang Cine Awards 2012
  - Best Film – Prabhas Raut
  - Best Actor – Anubhav Mohanty
  - Best Supporting Actor – Minaketan Das
  - Best Comedian – Papu Pam Pam
- 3rd Etv Oriya Film Awards 2012
  - Best Film – Prabhas Raut
  - Best Director – Sudhakara Basanta
  - Best Actor – Anubhav Mohanty
  - Best Comedian – Papu Pam Pam
  - Best Music director – Abhijit Majumdar
  - Best Lyrics writer – Nirmal Nayak
- Lalchand Entertainment Awards 2012
  - Best Actor – Anubhav Mohanty
