= Ae Jugara Krushna Sudama =

- Directed by: Hara Patnaik
- Starring: Mithun Chakraborty; Uttam Mohanty
- Music by: Swarup Nayak
- Release date: 2003
- Running time: 125 minutes
- Country: India
- Language: Odia

Ae Jugara Krushna Sudama is a 2003 Odia-language film, directed by Hara Patnaik, starring Mithun Chakraborty and Uttam Mohanty. It is a remake of Hindi-language film Khudgarz which itself was based on Jeffrey Archer's 1979 novel Kane and Abel. It was Mithun's second Odia movie after his special appearance in the 1998 film Sahara Jaluchi.

== Plot ==
Ae Jugara Krushna Sudama is the story of the love and friendship between a wealthy person (played by Uttam Mohanty) and a poor person (played by Mithun Chakraborty).

== Cast ==
- Mithun Chakraborty
- Uttam Mohanty
- Anita Das

== Box office ==
Ae Jugara Krushna Sudama was a box office success.
