= Haata Dhari Chaaluthaa =

2013 Indian Odia-language film

Haata Dhari Chaalutha
- Poster
- Directed by: Himansu Parija
- Produced by: Anubhav Mohanty; Anuprash Mohanty
- Starring: Anubhav Mohanty; Barsha Priyadarshini; Bijay Mohanty; Tandra Roy; Kuna Tripathy
- Cinematography: R. Bhagat Singh
- Edited by: Chandra Sekhar Mishra
- Music by: Prem Anand
- Distributed by: Vishnu Priya Arts & Graphics
- Release date: 14 June 2013
- Country: India
- Language: Odia
- Budget: ₹1.20 crore (equivalent to ₹2.0 crore or US$210,000 in 2023)
- Box office: ₹2.80 crore (equivalent to ₹4.8 crore or US$490,000 in 2023)

Haata Dhari Chalutha is a 2013 Odia Drama movie directed by Himansu Parija. It was produced by Anubhav Mohanty & Anuprash Mohanty. The film stars with Anubhav Mohanty and Barsha Priyadarshini in lead roles. The music was given by Prem Anand. The film released on 14 June 2013. The film was a remake of Telugu film Solo.

== Synopsis ==
Sai is an orphan, who wants to marry a girl from a joint family to get blessing from elders. He falls in love with Samparna who belongs to a joint family. He tries to woo her and finally she falls in love with him. Samparna shares a very good relationship with everyone at home, especially her parent Abinash & Sumitra. When Abinash Choudhury finds his daughter's relationship with an orphan, he strongly disapproves it. Abinash wants his daughter should marry a boy from influential family. But at last he agrees and approves the marriage of Sai and Sampurna.

== Cast ==
- Anubhav Mohanty as Sai
- Barsa Priyadarshini as Samparna
- Bijay Mohanty as Abinash Choudhury
- Gudu as Sai's friend
- Tandra Ray as Sumitra Choudhury
- Debu Bose as Ekta's husband
- Kuna Tripathy as Dushmant Kumar
- Jaya as Samurna's friend
- Runu Parija as Seema
- Minaketan Das as Sangram (as Minaketan)
- Harihara Mahapatra as Lecturer
- Salil Mitra as Amresh
- Pinky as Sampurna's sister
- Namrata Das as Ekta
- Pintu Nanda as Henchman

== Production ==
The film was previously planned with an English title "Made for each other", but The director Himanshu Parija convinced the producers to keep an Odia name for the title.

== Soundtrack ==
The music for the movie was composed by Prem Anand. The audio was released in Cuttack, Odisha on 20 April 2013 .

Tracklist
No.	Title	Lyrics	Artist(s)	Length
1.	"Hata Dhari Chalutha (title song)"	Arun Mantri	Udit Narayan, Ira Mohanty
2.	"Sathire Sathi Sathi"	Arun Mantri	Udit Narayan
3.	"Batoi Mu Eka Eka"	Basant Raj Samal]	Udit Narayan
4.	"Mo Luhara Ranga Aaji"	Basant Raj Samal	Udit Narayan
5.	"Prema Ra Baji"	Arun Mantri	Udit Narayan, Ira Mohanty

== Awards ==
- Filmfare Awards East
  - Best Odia Film (Nominated)
  - Best Odia director(Nominated) - Himanshu Parija
  - Best Odia Actor (Nominated) - Anubhav Mohanty
  - Best Odia Actress (Nominated) - Barsa Priyadarshini
- Tarang Cine Awards 2014
  - Best Film
  - Best Actor - Anubhav Mohanty
  - Best Dialogue - Bijaya Malla

== Box office ==
It received excellent reviews by critics, and the film did good business at box office.
