= Samaya Hathare Dori =

- Directed by: Amulya Das
- Written by: Amulya Das
- Produced by: Smt. Tilotoma Das; Choudhary Pinky Das
- Starring: Siddhanta Mahapatra; Anu Chowdhury; Mihir Das; Meghna Mishra; Debu Bose
- Cinematography: Ganeswara Mohapatra
- Music by: Rati-Alok
- Distributed by: Dreamland Cine Crafts
- Release date: 2007
- Country: India
- Language: Odia

Samaya Hathare Dori is a 2007 Indian Oriya film directed by Amulya Das.

== Cast ==
- Siddhanta Mahapatra
- Anu Chowdhury
- Mihir Das
- Aparajita Mohanty
- Meghna Mishra
- Debajani
- Debu Bose
- Dorian Cenaj
