= Phoring =

2013 Indian Bengali film

- Film Title Art
- Directed by: Indranil Roychowdhury
- Written by: Indranil Roychowdhury; Sugata Sinha
- Produced by: Sugata Bal (Das); Anasua Roychowdhury; Pinaki Shoukalin Ghosh
- Starring: Akash Adhikari; Sohini Sarkar; Sourav Basak; Sankar Debnath; Senjuti Roy Mukherji; Dwijen Bandopadhyay; Ritwick Chakraborty
- Cinematography: Indranil Mukherjee
- Edited by: Sumit Ghosh
- Music by: Prabuddha Banerjee
- Production company: G B C Enterprise
- Release date: 27 September 2013
- Running time: 2hr 07min
- Country: India
- Language: Bengali

Phoring is a 2013 Bengali feature drama film directed by Indranil Roychowdhury. It was produced by Chitrabeekshan Audio Visual PVT LTD., and is 126 minutes long. The film won the Prasad Labs post-production completion award for 2012.

== Plot ==
An adolescent boy (Phoring, Bengali for "Dragonfly") grows up in a back-of-beyond township in North Bengal. Surrounded by the lush Dooars countryside, the town barely survives the shutdown of a factory. Maladjusted and a born loser, Phoring fights the voices in his head which he calls God. A new teacher (Doel) arrives in school, and opens up his mind to things unknown. Phoring starts to believe that this is not a dream. Doel invites Phoring to her house to nurture his creative skills. She also presents a cell phone to Phoring during Phoring's birthday. Phoring records a video of Doel while celebrating and dancing. This video tape is leaked out by one of Phoring's classmate Lattu. Doel is harassed by a group of older teachers. Phoring's mother warns Doel to stay away from him. An enraged Doel starts avoiding Phoring. Phoring is suspended from his school. Then Doel's brother comes and resides in Doel's house. One day Phoring and his friend discovers some firearms and a transceiver in the locked down factories. Doel and his brother disappears abruptly leaving behind a trail of doubt and suspicion. Police then searches for them due to be linked with terrorism. Phoring decides to go looking for her in Kolkata. He stays many a days doing hard labour in a Muslim-owned hotel to survive in the city. At last he meets Doel in a jail. Before departing Doel promises him that she will write letter to him. He ultimately returns to his town.

== Awards and screenings ==
Vincent Ward Prize. Asian New Talents Competition. Shanghai International Film Festival.2014 Best Project: Work In Progress Lab. Filmbazar 2012, Goa Selection, Indian Panorama, 2013 Also Screened at: Indian Film Festival Los Angeles and Indian Film Festival Stuttgart, Chiocago South Asian Film Festival, Indian Film Festival, Prague. all in 2014.

Filmfare Awards East:

- Best Cinematography: Indraneel Mukherjee
- Best Background score: Prabuddha Banerjee
- Best Debut Actor: Sohini Sarkar
- Best Debut Director: Indranil Roychowdhury

Zee Bangla Gaurav Samman:

- Rituporno Ghosh Memorial Award: Akash Adhikary and Indranil Roychowdhury
- Best Actress (Jury) - Sohini Sarkar
