= Suna Harini =

1999 Indian Odia-language film

- Directed by: Himanshu Parija
- Produced by: Keshab Rout
- Starring: Siddhanta Mahapatra; Suresh Bal; Rachana Banerjee; Debu Bose; Mihir Das; Pradyumna Lenka
- Cinematography: Dilip Ray
- Edited by: Deben Misra
- Music by: Manmath Misra
- Release date: 12 October 1999
- Country: India
- Language: Odia

Suna Harini is a 1999 Oriya film directed by Himanshu Parija. The film's music director was Manmath Misra. The film starring Rachana Banerjee and Siddhanta Mahapatra in the lead roles. The film was a box office success.

== Cast ==
- Suresh Bal
- Rachana Banerjee
- Debu Bose
- Mihir Das
- Pradyumna Lenka
- Siddhanta Mahapatra
