= Dream Girl (2009 film) =

- Directed by: Ashok Pati
- Written by: Ashok Pati
- Produced by: Ramesh Prasad
- Starring: Sabyasachi Mishra; Priya Chowdhury; Bijay Mohanty; Aparajita Mohanty; Mihir Das; Jairam Samal
- Cinematography: Sitanshu Mahapatra
- Edited by: Chandra Sekhar Misra
- Music by: Prashant Padhi
- Production company: Prasad Productions
- Distributed by: Rajshree
- Release date: 5 February 2009
- Country: India
- Language: Odia

Dream Girl is a 2009 Indian Oriya film under Prasad Productions (P) Ltd., directed by Ashok Pati. The film stars Sabyasachi Mishra and Priya. This film is a remake of the Telugu film Bommarillu.

== Synopsis ==
The story is about a boy and his family. The story is about all the fathers, all the relations, the so-called generation gap, and especially about a dream girl, who has changed the boy's life. The story can be treated as a moral for each and every family in an entertaining way. When a baby is born and learns to walk, his father holds his hand and teaches him to walk. But what will be the situation if the father will not leave the hand even after 24 years? This is the situation of the boy in this story. He wants freedom in his life and wants to live by his own choice, but he always has to accept his father's decision as his one and only choice. He is bent on marrying a girl of his own choice, and how successful he became, perfectly depicted in this movie.

== Cast ==
- Sabyasachi Mishra as Sanju
- Priya as Khusi
- Mihir Das
- Aparajita Mohanty
- Bijaya Mohanty
- Bobby Mishra
- Pintu Nanda
- Jairam Samal
- Sofia alam
- Debu Bose
- Saheb Singh
- Jina Samal
- Jiban
- Chunga
- Roja
- Florence
- Chuni

== Music ==
The music of the film composed by Prashant Padhi. The tracks from the film include:

Track	Singer	Lyricist
Aakhi Mora Khola Thae Kehi Jane	Tapu Mishra & Udit Narayan	Arun Mantri
Jahna Soichi Soi Padile Tara	Kumar Bapi & Tapu Mishra	Arun Mantri
Priyare Priyare Najare Najare	Krishna Beura	Nizam
Sathire Sathire Pahili Pritire	Tapu Misra	Nizam
