= Kajal =

Kajal may also refer to:

== People ==
- Kajol Mukherjee (born 1974), known as Kajol or Kajal, Indian film actress
- Kajal Aggarwal (born 1985), Indian actress
- Kajal Ahmad (born 1967), Kurdish poet
- Kajal Kiran (born 1958), Indian actress who debuted in 1977
- Kajal Mukherjee (1942–2006), Indian footballer
- Kajal Jain (born 1985), Indian model and actress
- Kaajal Oza Vaidya (born 1966), Indian writer
- Kaajal Pasupathi, Indian actress

== Places ==
- Kajal (village), a village in Slovakia
- Kajal, Iran, a village in Ardabil Province, Iran

== Films ==
- Kaajal, a 1965 Indian Hindi-language film

== Other ==
- kajal, another name for kajol/kohl, an eye cosmetic in use since ancient times

== See also ==
- Kaja (name)
- Kaajjal, Indian drama television series
- Kohl (cosmetics)
