= Mate Ta Love Helare =

2008 Odia film directed by Ashok Pati

- Directed by: Ashok Pati
- Written by: Bijaya Pattnaik
- Produced by: Bijaya Pattnaik
- Starring: Siddhanta; Anuvab; Subhashree; Mihir Das; Bijoy Mohanty
- Cinematography: K.R. Ramesh
- Edited by: Susanta Mani
- Music by: Bachu Mukharjee
- Distributed by: Brajaraj Movies
- Release date: March 2008
- Country: India
- Language: Odia

Mate Ta Love Helare is a 2008 Indian Odia-language action film directed by Ashok Pati. This film is loose remake of Telugu Movie Student No. 1 starring Jr NTR.

== Synopsis ==
The hero Akash believes in high thinking. He has a lot of dreams and he is very serious for his studies because he wants to bring a bright future for his mother and sister. Akash meets his love megha at the college. But all his dreams come to a dark side after he enters college. Akash falls into the trap laid by Mafia don Bhalu Bhai and his brother King. And the story of "Mate Ta Love Helare" moves around how Akash comes out of the trap and punish the don and how he gets his love.

== Cast ==
- Siddhanta- Bhalu Bhai
- Anuvab- Akash
- Subhashree- Megha
- Bijoy Mohanty
- Mihir Das
- Bobby Mishra
- Satwaki Mishra
- Illu Banarjee
- Anita Das
- Puspa Panda
- Pintu Nanda
- Twinkil

== Reception ==
The movie was made on a very high budget and was technically a very well made movie. Though the movie had a lot of graphics and could attract youth but still since the movie was released in an off season (at the time of exams) the film could not do the kind of business as it was expected. The movie got just a more than average response at the box office. The film also marked the film debut of actress Subhashree.
