= Saathire =

2004 Indian Odia-language film

- Directed by: Hara Patnaik
- Written by: Leena Gangopadhaya (story: Janmadin)
- Starring: Anubhav Mohanty, Madhumita Basu, Pintu Nanda, Anita Das
- Release date: 2004
- Country: India
- Language: Odia

Saathire (transl. Oh my dear friend) is a 2004 Indian Odia language film directed by Hara Patnaik and starring Anubhav Mohanty, Madhumita Basu, Pintu Nanda and Anita Das. The film based on Leena Gangopadhay's story Janmadin, which itself was based on Bengali film Troyee (1982). It was released in 2004. The film was a box office success.

== Cast ==
- Anubhav Mohanty
- Madhumita Basu
- Pintu Nanda
- Anita Das

== Production ==
Madhumita Basu from Kolkata made her debut with this film after local girls were against acting in a romantic film. The film was shot in Agra and Kulu-Manali.
