= Deewana Deewani =

- Directed by: Ashok Pati
- Screenplay by: Ashok Pati
- Story by: Pramod Kumar Swain
- Produced by: Siba Prasad Das; Pramod Kumar Swain
- Starring: Babushaan; Madhumita Chakraborty; Mihir Das; Minaketan Das; Debashis Parta
- Cinematography: Sitansu Mohapatra
- Edited by: Sushant Mani
- Music by: Prasant Padhi
- Production company: Mahadev Films
- Release date: 24 March 2013
- Country: India
- Language: Odia

Deewana Deewani is a 2013 Romantic Odia language film directed by Ashok Pati. The film's music director was Prasant Padhi. This film starring Babushaan, Madhumita Chakraborty, Mihir Das, Minaketan Das in the lead roles. It is a remake of Dev's blockbuster Bengali film Khokababu (2012).

== Cast ==
- Babushaan
- Madhumita Chakraborty
- Mihir Das
- Minaketan Das
- Debashis Parta
- Pintu Nanda
- Runu Parija
- Sasmita Pradhan

== Soundtrack ==
Deewana Deewani

Soundtrack album by Prasant Padhi
- Released: 24 March 2013
- Recorded: 2013
- Studio: Sun Music
- Genre: Feature Film Soundtrack
- Length: 21.28

Original Tracklist
No.	Title	Singer(s)	Length
1.	"Diwana Mu Diwani Tu"	Udit Narayan, Pamela Jain	04.49
2.	"He Mu Kacha Marka No 1 Hero"	Vinod Rathod, Pamela Jain	04.49
3.	"Haire to Jadu"	Babul Supriyo, Pamela Jain	04.00
4.	"Rakhichi Nei Tote Chatire"	Shaan	04.07
5.	"Asilu Jadi Ae Jibana"	Gudlly Ratha	04.23
Total length:			21.28
