= Pintu Nanda =

Indian actor (1977–2023)

- ପିଣ୍ଟୁ ନନ୍ଦ
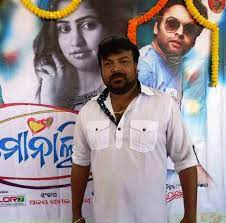
- Born: 7 July 1976; Jagatsinghpur, Orissa, India
- Died: 1 March 2023 (aged 45); Hyderabad, Telangana, India
- Occupation: (Odia) actor
- Years active: 1996–2023
- Spouse: Shilpa Jena (wife)
- Children: Shreyansh Nanda (son)
- Parent(s): Ashok Kumar Nanda; Kantilata Nanda
- Awards: state award

‌Pintu Nanda ([piɳʈu nɔnd̪ɔ]; 7 July 1977 – 1 March 2023) was an Indian film and television actor from Odisha.

He started his career through an Odia daily soap opera on DD Odia.

Later in 1996, Nanda debuted in Ollywood through the film Koili. He appeared in more than 115 Odia movies in various roles as hero, villain, character artist and comedian. Some of his popular films include Dosti, Haata Dhari Chaaluthaa, Rumku Jhumana, Wrong Number, and Prema Rutu Asilare.

Apart from television and movies, Nanda appeared in some popular Odia album songs. One of his famous Odia albums was E Gaura Kana Khauchu.

== Early life and family ==
Nanda was born on 7 July 1977, to Ashok Kumar Nanda and Kantilata Nanda, in Jagatsinghpur, Odisha.

His elder brother Abhiram Nanda is a popular flute player in Odisha.

After completing his education from SK Academy in Jagatsinghpur, Pintu studied in Delhi.

His elder son's name is Shreyansh Nanda; he is studying in Shimla. His younger one's name is Ishan; he joined politics as a Bharatiya Janata Party (BJP) leader.

== Personal life and death ==
Nanda died at a hospital in Hyderabad, on 1 March 2023, at the age of 45. He was suffering from cirrhosis of the liver.

== Filmography ==
=== Odia films ===
| Year | Films | role | Note |
|---|---|---|---|
| 1996 | Koili | | Debuted in Ollywood |
| 1997 | Ram Laxman | | |
| 1999 | Maa Gojabayani | | |
| 1999 | Jay Sriram | Mantu Mohanty | |
| 1999 | To Akhi Mo Aina | Dr. Badal | |
| 1999 | Biswaprakash | | |
| 2002 | Wrong Number | Kunal | |
| 2003 | Maa Mangala | | |
| 2003 | Aeithi Swarga Aeithi Narka | | |
| 2003 | Bahudibe Mo Jaga Balia | Tomi | |
| 2004 | I Love You | Samar | |
| 2004 | Sathire | Bikram Rautrai | |
| 2004 | Rakhiba Jadi Se Maariba Kie | | |
| 2005 | O My Love | | |
| 2006 | Priya Mo Asiba Pheri | Haria | |
| 2006 | Prema Rutu Aslilare | | |
| 2006 | I Love My India | Abinash's friend | |
| 2006 | Rakate Lekhichi Naa | Pintu | |
| 2007 | Jai Jagannath | Lord Balabhadra | |
| 2007 | Kali Sankar | Bala Brahmachari | |
| 2007 | Lal Tuku Tuku Sadhaba Bahu | Servant | |
| 2007 | Monika O My Darling | | |
| 2007 | Mahanayak | Sanjay Rai | |
| 2008 | Hasiba Puni Mo Suna Sansar | Pintu | |
| 2008 | Mate Ta Love Helare | Pintu | |
| 2008 | Nandini I Love U | Salim | |
| 2008 | Munna: A Love Story | Stabilizer | |
| 2008 | To Bina Bhala Lagena | Suresh | |
| 2009 | Dream Girl | | |
| 2009 | Mitare Meeta | Pintu | |
| 2009 | Abhimanyu | Jay | |
| 2009 | Prem Rogi | Hari | |
| 2010 | Mu Kana Ete Kharap | Mall owner | |
| 2010 | Sanju Aau Sanjana | Parsu's brother | |
| 2010 | Pahili Raja | Dipankar | |
| 2010 | Bhul Bujhibani Mate | Ankit | |
| 2010 | Swayamsiddha | Subhendu | |
| 2010 | Tora More Jodi Sundara | Film Producer | |
| 2010 | Diwana | Pintu | |
| 2010 | Prema Adhei Akshyara | Pintu | |
| 2010 | Tu Tha Mun Jauchi Rushi | | |
| 2011 | Mana Mora Prajapati | | |
| 2011 | Hero – Prem Katha | Rana | |
| 2011 | 143 – I Love You | Pintu | |
| 2011 | Chori Chori Mana Chori | | |
| 2011 | Dosti | Badal | |
| 2011 | Aain Kanoon | | |
| 2011 | Mathare Dei Pata Odhani | | |
| 2012 | Shapath | Ali | |
| 2012 | Gud Boy | Bunty | |
| 2012 | Chanda Na Tame Tara | | |
| 2012 | Love Master | Bhanu Pratap | |
| 2012 | Parshuram | Debasis | |
| 2013 | Badhu Nuhen Mu Bandhu | | |
| 2013 | Deewana Deewani | Rajanikant | |
| 2013 | Rumku Jhumana | | |
| 2013 | Ashok Samrat | Chanakya Misra | |
| 2013 | Hata Dhari Chalutha | Goon | |
| 2013 | Daha Balunga | Bikram | |
| 2013 | Hari Om Hari | Sultan Khan | |
| 2013 | Dharma | Billu Badsahah | |
| 2013 | Bachelor | Badal Patnaik | |
| 2014 | Puni Dekha Heba Ara Janamare | | |
| 2014 | Haribol Nuhe Tanka Bol | special appearance | |
| 2014 | Sahitya Didi | | |
| 2014 | Omm | Pintu Dada | |
| 2014 | Mental | Vicky | |
| 2014 | Tame Thile Sathire | Pintu | |
| 2014 | Ganja Ladhei | Saheb Singh | |
| 2014 | Bhairav | | |
| 2015 | Maya | | |
| 2015 | Aashiq | Doctor | |
| 2015 | Bindas Romeo | | |
| 2016 | Jouthi Tu Seithi Mu | | |
| 2017 | Bajarangi | | |
| 2017 | Hero No. 1 | | |
| 2017 | Katha Deli Matha Chhuin | | |
| 2017 | Suna Pila Tike Scre Dhila | | |
| 2018 | Love Express | | |
| 2018 | Shakti | | |
| 2018 | Prema Pain Mahabaharata | | |
| 2019 | Nayakara Naan Debadeasa | | |
| 2019 | Love Twist | | |
| 2019 | Bobal Toka | | |
| 2019 | From Me to You | | |
| 2019 | Rangila Bohu | | |
| 2019 | Kalia Karuchhi Leela | | |
| 2020 | Mun Paradesi Chadhei | | |
| 2021 | Super Boy | | |
| 2021 | Laali Haba Kahara | | |
| 2021 | Mr. Romeo | | |
| 2021 | Cuttack Weds Sambalpur | | |
| 2021 | Sahid Raghu Sardar | | |
| 2021 | Durgatinasini 2 | | |
| 2021 | Shastharu Nasta | | |
| 2021 | Chorani | | |
| 2021 | Premikaya Namah | | |
| 2021 | Ea Bi Gote Love Story | | |
| 2021 | Pal Pal Tate Chahen | | |
| 2021 | Herogiri | | |
| 2022 | Sahani Ghara Kahani | | |
| 2022 | Anguru Na Milile Khata | | |
| 2022 | Hau Hau Heigalare | | |
| 2022 | Love Fever | | |
| 2022 | Didi Namaskar | | |
| 2022 | Biswanath | | |
| 2022 | Chorani 2 | | |
| 2022 | Kuruksetra | | |
| 2022 | KRAZZY-4 | | |
| 2022 | Sesha Rati | | |
| 2022 | Rudrani | | |
| 2022 | Pari Karibe Bhola Shankar | | |
| 2022 | Tu Mora OK | | |
| 2022 | Bichha Gang | | |
| 2022 | Police Babu | | |
| 2022 | Mukha | | |
| 2022 | To Nara Mane Han | | |
| 2023 | Pushkara | | |

=== Television ===
| Serial | Channel | Role |
|---|---|---|
| Randi Pua Ananta | DD Odia | Ananta |
| Sankha Sindura | Tarang TV | |
| Jibana Saathi | Zee Sarthak | |

== Awards ==
- 2005: Odisha State Film Awards as best comedian for Wrong Number
- 2006: Odisha State Film Awards as best comedian for Prema Rutu Asilare
- 2014: Best Actor in Comic Role by Tarang Cine Awards for Deewana Deewani

== See also ==
- List of Indian actors
