= Arindam Bhattacharya =

Arindam Bhattacharya may refer to:

- Arindam Bhattacharya (politician) (born 1980), Indian politician
- Arindam Bhattacharya (footballer) (born 1989), Indian footballer
