= Arindam Mukherjee =

Indian photojournalist (born 1974)

Arindam Mukherjee (born 1974) is an Indian photojournalist who works in print media. Arindam’s works have so far been published in Private Magazine, The Sunday Telegraph, Stern, New Statesman, Der Spiegel, Liberation, de Volkskrant, Le Figaro and several other major publications around the globe. Arindam generally produces reports on sociological issues of his country.

Born and grown up in Calcutta - the eastern metropolis of India - he lives with his wife and mother in the same city, and is currently represented by Sipa Press.

Mukherjee awarded the New America Media prize for photojournalism in 2009.

Mukherjee received the prestigious Media Fellowship from Nation Foundation for India in 2003-2004.

Mukherjee published in Prestigious Private Photo review magazine. https://web.archive.org/web/20100622064601/http://www.privatephotoreview.com/en/review/private.php/riv/65/page/27
