= Mo Duniya Tu Hi Tu =

- Poster
- Directed by: Sudhakar Basant
- Story by: Vikraman
- Based on: Unnidathil Ennai Koduthen (Tamil)
- Produced by: Soumya Ranjan Patnaik
- Starring: Anubhav Mohanty, Barsha Priyadarshini, Siddhanta Mahapatra
- Edited by: Rathod Club
- Music by: Malay Mishra
- Production company: Manjari Movies
- Distributed by: Manjari Movies
- Release date: 11 January 2013
- Country: India
- Language: Odia

Mo Duniya Tu Hi Tu is a 2013 Indian Odia drama film directed by Sudhakar Basant and starring Anubhav, Barsha and Minaketan in pivotal roles with original soundtrack by Malay Misra. It was a remake of Tamil film Unnidathil Ennai Koduthen.

== Synopsis ==
Heera and his uncle and are petty thieves. One day while escaping from the police they hide in a house. Payal, a governess in that house, is taking care of three children while the rest of the family is out of town. She locks them in her kitchen for one week, that one week relation with Payal changes entire lifestyle of Heera, he starts a new life and slowly falls in love with Payal. Meanwhile, before leaving the house, Heera's uncle steals Payals's diary, Heera starts reading the diary.

Payal is an illegitimate daughter of Lawyer, whose house she is living as a maidservant along with her step mother, her sister, sister's husband and their three children without knowing she is Lawyers's daughter. When one of her relatives Akash comes from abroad, Priya likes him and intend to marry Akash, but Akash needs times to decide. After reading this Heera decides not to express his love and from that day he also makes a habit of writing a diary. Next day when he goes to return the diary a conflict arises to Payal because of him, she has been thrown out of the house due to confusion. Heera decides to take care of Payal, and builds her career as singer. Once when Payal gone to foreign tour they blame robbery on Heera and sends him away from the house. Payal returns from the tour, but she does not believe that Heera is a thief and she starts reading his diary which Heera forgot to take and understands how much love Heera hidden in his heart for her.

At last Payal's family members are making of marriage arrangements of Akash & Payal. In the function even Heera attends the function, hidden in public, but Payal sees him, she acknowledges her entire success at his feet and decides to marry him, even Akash also appreciates her decision. Finally, movie ends with marriage of Heera & Payal.

== Cast ==
- Anubhav Mohanty as Heera
- Barsa Priyadarshini as Payal
- Minaketan Das
- Siddhanta Mahapatra in Guest appearance
- Salil Mitra as Heera's uncle
- Prutiviraj Nayak
- Jeeban Panda
- Pratibha Panda
- Debashis Patra as Akash

== Soundtrack ==
The music for the film is composed by Malay Misra.

| Song | Lyrics | Singer(s) |
|---|---|---|
| Mo Duniya Tu Hi Tu(title song) | Arun Mantri | Bappi Lahiri, Ira Mohanty |
| Sathi Tora Sundara | Basant Raj Samal | Roop Kumar Rathod, Ira Mohanty |
| Kanhei Re Kanhei | Basant Raj Samal | Udit Narayan |
| Tu Daki Delu | Basant Raj Samal | Ira Mohanty |
| Kichhi Kichhi Asha | Arun Mantri | Debashis Mahapatra, Ira Mohanty |
| To Sathe Jebethu | Basant Raj Samal | Ira Mohanty |

== Reception ==
The film generally received positive reviews from critics. IncredibleOdisha gave it 4 out 5 star in the review and concluded "Mo Duniya Tu Hi Tu is a beautiful film with a social message at the end. Surprise packet of the movie is Salil's comedy. Barsha Priyadarshini acted very well in emotional scenes. Anubhav scored well in comedy scenes. Sidhant's performance is also very good." FullOrissa gave it 4.3 out of 5 and commented "Though the film is new and fresh, its unfair to write about the story. But here I would like to mention that the film is New Year gift from Megastar Anubhav to all his fans. He emotes excellent in sentimental sequences and he surely rocks the viewers in songs and dialogues. Brasha Priyadarshini has a tailor-made role and she has really used it to show her acting skills".

== Box office ==
The film did quite brilliant performance at the box office, becoming one of the highest grossing Odia movie of all time.

== Awards ==
- Filmfare Awards East
  - Best Oriya Film (Nominated)
  - Best Oriya director(Nominated)- Sudhakar Basanta
  - Best Oriya Actor (Nominated)-Anubhav Mohanty
  - Best Oriya Actress (Nominated)-Barsa Priyadarshini
