= Arindam Ghosh =

Arindam Ghosh can refer to:

- Arindam Ghosh (physicist), Indian experimental condensed matter physicist
- Arindam Ghosh (cricketer) (born 1986)
