= Naina Dash =

Indian actress

- ନୈନା ଦାଶ
- Born: June 1984 (age 41)
- Occupations: Actress, Model
- Years active: 2002–present
- Spouse: Siddharth Tiwari (m. 2011)

Naina Dash (also known as Naina Das) is an Odia actress who appears in Odia cinema and television.

== Career ==
Naina Dash began acting while in 12th standard. Besides acting in Odia and acting in Telugu films, Das has achieved success in Odia TV serials. She has anchored the longest running serial in Odisha titled Kalyani - An Innovative Health Programme. She has also acted in one Bengali and two Chhattisgarhi films.

== Personal life ==
She was born in Bhubaneswar, Odisha. She graduated in Odissi vocals from Utkal Sangeet Mahavidyalaya. She did her masters' degree in Public Relations and Marketing from Regional College of Management.

== Filmography ==
Year	Film	Role	Language	Notes
2003	Bahudibe Mo Jaga Balia	Subhadra	Odia	
2003	Maa Mangala		Odia	
2005	Mo Mana Khali Tori Pain		Odia	Special appearance
2006	Shasu Ghara Chalijibi	Gita	Odia	
2007	Puja Pain Phulatie	Dr Mohapatra	Odia	
2008	Munna-A Love Story	Nisha	Odia	
2009	Aa Janhare Lekhiba Naa		Odia	Special appearance
2009	Junction	Naina	Telugu	
2010	Sambho Siva Sambho	Prabha	Telugu	
2016	Tamaku Dekhila Pare		Odia	

== Television ==
Year	Show	Role	Language	Network
	Prathama Swara		Odia	OTV
	Duhita		Odia	
2003	Tulasi	Nilima	Odia	ETV Odia
2007–2008	Subhalekha		Telugu	ETV

== Album ==
- Deunchi Mo Baan Aakhi

== Awards ==
- 2002: Best Supporting Actress for Duhita
- 2004: Odisha state level Sadvabhana Award
- 2004: Best Anchor of the Year (AB Visuals)
- 2005: ETV Odia – Most Wanted Anchor
