= Nandini I Love U =

Nandini I Love You
- Theatrical poster
- Directed by: Ashok Pati
- Written by: Ashok Pati
- Produced by: Anama Charana Sahoo
- Starring: Siddhanta Mahapatra; Buddhaditya Mohanty; Krisha; Ajit Das; Anita Das; Snigdha Mohanty
- Cinematography: Sitansu Mohapatra
- Edited by: Chandra Sekhar Mishra
- Music by: Prasant Padhi
- Distributed by: Laxmi Puja Pvt. Ltd
- Release date: 2008
- Country: India
- Language: Odia

Nandini I Love U is a 2008 Indian Oriya film directed by Ashok Pati. It is the first venture of Producer Anama Charana Sahoo, under the banner of Laxmi Puja Pvt. Ltd. Siddhanta Mahapatra and Buddhaditya Mohanty are playing the male lead characters whereas Bollywood fame Krisha is playing the female lead.

== Cast ==
- Siddhanta Mahapatra -Sri Ram
- Budhaditya- Jeet
- Krisha - Nandini
- Ajit Das
- Snigdha Mohanty
- Anita Das
- Bobby Mishra
- Pintu Nanda
- Debu Bramha
- Mamuni Mishra
- Roja
