= Minaketan Das =

Indian actor

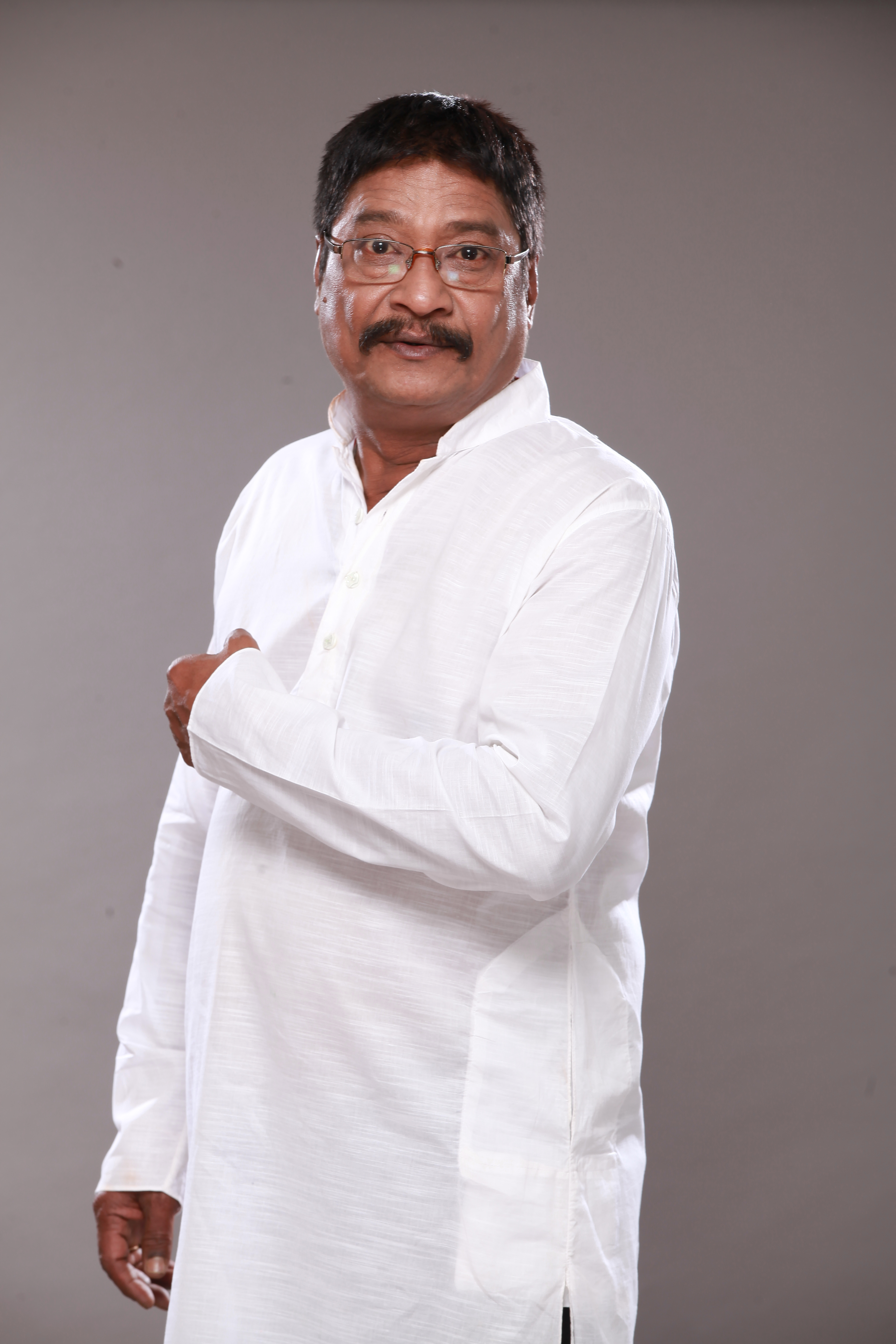
- Born: September 7, 1961; India
- Died: June 30, 2017 (aged 55); Balianta (6 km east of Bhubaneswar)
- Occupation: Actor

Minaketan Das (7 September 1961 – 30 June 2017) was an Indian actor, Comedian, and Villain active in the cinema of Odisha.

== Career ==
He made his debut in Odia cinema with the Odia - language film Sindura Nuhein Khela Ghara in 2002.

== Death ==
He died on 30 June 2017 of pancreatic cancer at his home in Balianta, Bhubaneswar, aged 56.

== Filmography ==
He appeared in supporting roles in Odia films.

== Selected filmography ==
- Jiye Jaha Kahu Mora Dho (2015)
- My Love Story (2013)
- Deewana Deewani (2013)
- Idiot: I Do Ishq Only Tumse (2012)
- Balunga Toka (2011)
- Sindura Nuhein Khela Ghara (2002)
