= To Bina Bhala Lagena =

- Directed by: Jyoti Das
- Written by: Prasant Jena
- Produced by: Prasant Jena
- Starring: Sabyasachi Mishra; Pupinder; Anita Das; Rupali; Mihir Das
- Music by: Abhijit Majumdar
- Distributed by: Richa Cine Lab
- Release date: 2008
- Country: India
- Language: Odia

To Bina Bhala Lagena is a 2008 Indian Oriya film directed by Jyoti Das.

== Plot ==
The film starts with the first encounter happening between Deepak and Jyoti. Romance eventually blossoms between the two characters Deepak and Jyoti with the violin sessions and Deepak coming up for Jyoti's safeguard. The introduction scene of Pupinder justifies his colourful character of "Suraj" portrayed in the film. The fast half of the movie is almost flawless with proper pace and the movie continues almost with a single flow without much constraint but post-interval the movie becomes almost predictable and it seems like an old wine in a new bottle. Sometimes the pace of the movie tends to get slower specially after when Deepak becomes aware of his friend's love interest and attempts to make his love to get sacrificed for his friend Suraj's happiness.

== Cast ==
- Sabyasachi Mishra as Deepak
- Pupinder as Suraj
- Anita Das
- Rupali as Jyoti
- Mihir Das
