= Chandni Khan =

Indian activist and editor

- Born: 1997 (age 28–29)
- Other names: Chandni Di
- Occupations: children's rights activist and editor
- Organizations: Badhte Kadam; Voice of Slum
- Known for: Founding the NGO Voice of Slum; Contribution to welfare of street children in India.

Chandni Khan born in 1997 (age 28–29) is an Indian activist and editor working for the welfare of street children in different parts of India. She founded the NGO, Voice of Slum along with Dev Pratap Singh. She was the editor of the newspaper Balaknama, literally meaning "voice of children", published in New Delhi. She is also called Chandni Di, the word di meaning "older sister" in some Indian languages.

== Life and education ==
Chandni was a homeless child herself. At the age of five, she started performing street shows with her father in Noida. He died in 2008, after which she and her mother survived by ragpicking and selling flowers at traffic intersections. She was twelve when she met some volunteers of CHETNA, an NGO that facilitates education and healthcare for underprivileged children. With the NGO's assistance, Chandni enrolled into an open school programme in 2010.

== Career ==
In 2010, Chandni started working as a trainee reporter at Balaknama, a newspaper brought out by and for street children in Delhi. CHETNA started the newspaper and continues to support it. Four years later, she was promoted to the position of its editor. Simultaneously, she started working for CHETNA's sister NGO Badhte Kadam. As the National Secretary of Badhte Kadam, she has worked for the welfare and rights of homeless children in Delhi, Uttar Pradesh, Madhya Pradesh, and Haryana.

She co-founded Voice of Slum in 2015 with her friend Dev Pratap Singh, who had also grown up in slums. The organization, among other things, runs a school in Noida for children living in low-income neighborhoods.

She has delivered talks at different TEDx events, Josh Talks and the United Nations Development Programme (UNDP).
She has worked with the United Nations Convention on the Rights of the Child (UNCRC), the National Commission for Protection of Child Rights (NCPCR), Child Relief and You (CRY), Save the Children, and Plan India.

== See also ==
- Street children in India
- Child labour in India
- Children's rights movement
