= Salil Mitra =

Indian comic actor (1967–2019)

Salil Kumar Mitra
- Born: Salil Kumar Mitra; April 7, 1967; Cuttack
- Died: June 4, 2019 (aged 52); KIMS Hospital, Bhubaneswar
- Occupations: Actor, Comedian
- Years active: 1999 – 2019
- Parent: Bankim Mitra
- Voice intro of Salil Mitra Voice intro of Salil Mitra recorded in August 2018

Salil Mitra (7 April 1967 – 4 June 2019) was an Indian comic actor who worked primarily in Odia cinema. He appeared across Odia films, television series, and theatre. Born in Karanjia, Mayurbhanj district, Mitra began his career in the Odia film industry in 1999 and subsequently performed in films, television serials, modern music albums, bhajans, and stage plays. He also played antagonistic roles in television serials such as Bada Ghara Bada Gumara Katha, broadcast on ETV Odia. Following severe injuries sustained in a road accident on 12 May 2019, he died while undergoing treatment on 4 June 2019.

== Career ==
Mitra began his career in the Odia film industry in 1999. His debut film was Pua Bhangidela Suna Sansara. Following this, he went on to perform in numerous Odia feature films, television shows, and plays, in addition to several modern Odia albums and devotional songs.

Some of his notable Odia films include Rahichi Rahibi Tori Pain, Sathire, Arjun, Rakate Lekhichi Naa, Kalishankar, Nari Nuhen Tu Narayani, Chhati Chiridele Tu, Aakashe Ki Ranga Lagila, Subha Vivaha, Tu Mo Akhira Tara, Om Namaha Shivaya, Hero, Balunga Toka, Kebe Tume Naha Kebe Mu Nahi, Tu Mo Arambha Tu Mo Shesha, Matric Fail, Idiot, Ganja Ladhei, Love Master, Chauka Chhaka, Something Something 2, Gapa Helebi Sata, Love Station, Agastya, and Sister Sridevi.

=== Filmography ===
Year	Film	Role	Notes
1999	Pua Bhangidela Suna Sansara		Debut Odia film
2002	Rahichi Rahibi Tori Pain		
2004	Sathire		
2005	Prathama Prema		
2005	Arjun		
2006	Priya Mo Asiba Pheri		
2006	Rakate Lekhichi Naa		
2007	Kalishankar		
2007	Nari Nuhen Tu Narayani		
2007	Mu Tate Love Karuchi		
2007	Mahanayaka		
2008	Satyameva Jayate		
2008	Chhati Chiri Dele Tu		
2009	Aakashe Ki Ranga Lagila		
2009	Tu Mori Pain		
2010	Subha Vivaha		
2010	To Akhire Mu		
2010	Om Namaha Shivaya	Benga	
2011	Hero	Constable Gobara	
2011	Criminal		
2011	Chandini I Miss You		
2011	Balunga Toka		
2012	Kebe Tume Naha Kebe Mu Nahi		
2012	Shapath		
2012	Tu Mo Arambha Tu Mo Shesha		
2012	Matric Fail		
2012	Idiot		
2012	Bad Girl		
2012	Love Master		
2012	Rangila Toka		
2013	Mo Duniya Tu Hi Tu		
2013	Mu Ashique Mu Awara		
2013	Chauka Chhaka		
2013	Hata Dhari Chalutha		
2013	Hari Om Hari		
2013	Tu Mo Dehara Chhai		
2013	Kehi Jane Bhala Lagere		
2013	Rudra		
2014	Tu Au Mu		
2014	Smile Please		
2014	Hari Bola Nuhen Tanka Bola		
2014	Om		
2014	Something Something 2		
2014	Mental		
2014	Ganja Ladhei		
2015	Love You Hamesha		
2015	Gapa Helebi Sata		
2015	Maya		
2015	Kaun Kitne Paani Mein		
2016	Gote Shua Gote Shari		
2016	Tiger		
2016	Love Station	Jagannath	
2016	Agastya		
2016	Jhiata Bigidigala		
2016	He Prabhu Dekha De		
2017	Sister Sridevi		
2017	Katha Deli Matha Chhui		
2017	Mu Khanti Odia Jhia		
2018	Sriman Surdas		
2018	Love Express		
2018	Tokata Phasigala		
2018	Excuse Me		
2018	Kulangar		
2019	Champion		
2019	Selfish Dil		
2019	Mal Mahu Jiban Mati		
2022	Dil Mora Manena		

=== Television ===
- Bada Ghara Bada Gumara Katha - ETV Odia

== Personal life ==
Salil Mitra was born on 7 April 1967 in Cuttack. His father was Bankim Mitra.

=== Death ===
Salil Mitra died on 4 June 2019. On 12 May 2019, while returning from a film shoot in Kendujhar, his vehicle was involved in a road accident near Ghatgaon College.

Immediately following the mishap, he was admitted to Ghatgaon Hospital and later transferred to SCB Medical College in Cuttack. He sustained severe fractures in his arms and legs, along with serious chest trauma. He was subsequently shifted to KIMS Hospital in Bhubaneswar for advanced treatment. Mitra succumbed to his injuries at 12:15 AM on 4 June 2019; attending doctors reported that his fractured ribs had collapsed and pierced his heart. He was 52 years old.
