= Mahanayak (2007 film) =

- Directed by: Debu Pattnaik; Sudhanshu Sahu
- Written by: Debu Pattnaik; Amma Rajasekhar (original story)
- Screenplay by: Subodh Pattnaik
- Produced by: Harsha Vardhan Lal
- Starring: Anubhav; Koel; Rahul Dev
- Music by: T. Souri
- Production company: Pine Cask Pvt. Ltd.
- Release date: 2007
- Running time: 171 minutes
- Country: India
- Language: Odia

Mahanayak (transl. The Great Hero) (subtitled as The Real Hero) is a 2007 Odia-language film directed by Debu Pattnaik, with Sudhanshu Sahu co-directing the film. The film stars Anubhav, Koel and Rahul Dev. It is a remake of the 2006 Telugu film Ranam starring Gopichand.

== Plot ==
Rohit is a mischievous yet brave young man whose antics cause trouble for his family, including his father. Because of this, his father tells him to give up his antics and sends him to college for higher studies, but in college, he falls in love with Preeti, the sister of the town's famous goon, Ranjit. For some reason, Ranjit and his henchmen have an altercation with Rohit. Despite Preeti's concern for Rohit, a relationship develops between them, and soon after, she also falls in love with Rohit. A rivalry grows between Rohit and Ranjit when the latter messes up with Rohit; after several incidents, Ranjit accepts defeat and ultimately allows his sister, Preeti, to marry Rohit. This is how Rohit and Preeti got married.

== Cast ==
- Anubhav as Rohit Rai
- Koel as Preeti
- Rahul Dev as Ranjit
- Harihara Mohapatra as Rohit's friend
- Bijay Mohanty as Jagannath Balwant Rai

== Production ==
Rahul Dev agreed to be a part of the film because it was directed by his friend. The film was shot in Hyderabad. While working on the film, Anubhav received the opportunity for a Hindi film in Mumbai, which he declined.

== Soundtrack ==
- Akasha Chhunibi Pahadaku Deinjibi - T. Souri, Tapu Mishra
- Karani Karani Prema Jama Karani - Subhasis Mahakud
- Baja Bajei Rani Sajei - T. Souri
- Haere Hae Mun Bhulita Jaye - Kumar Bapi, Tapu Mishra
- Jaa Jaa Re Megha - Tapu Mishra
- Oh Janiabe - Arvind Dutta, Tapu Mishra

== Release ==
The presence of Bengali actress Koel Mallick led the makers to dub the film in Bengali. The dubbed version was titled as Premi No. 1, leading to a huge confusion to most of the sites as well as the people, as the title was also meant for another of Anubhav's previous films released in 2005.
