= Namrata Thapa =

Indian television and film actress

- Occupation: Actress
- Years active: 2004–present

Namrata Thapa is an Indian film and television actress. She appeared in Yahaaan Main Ghar Ghar Kheli as Swarnlata Raj Singhania.

== Personal life ==
Thapa was born in Delhi and now resides in Mumbai. She graduated from Delhi University.

== Career ==
Thapa began her acting career with Ssshhhh...Koi Hai - Doosri Dulhan as Nikita (Pahadi Raja's sister) in Episode 18. The shoot was supposed to be happening in Jaipur, and they were auditioning for some roles in Delhi. She was doing modelling in Delhi and was 16 years old at that time. At the age of 18 and a half, she came to Mumbai. Vaidehi was her first show after coming to Mumbai, after which she appeared in shows such as Stree Teri Kahaani, Naaginn, Kuch Apne Kuch Paraye, Kahiin To Hoga, Mera Naam Karegi Roshan, Yahaaan Main Ghar Ghar Kheli, Jhilmil Sitaaron Ka Aangan Hoga, Badalte Rishton Ki Dastaan, and Tum Aise Hi Rehna. She appeared in Yahaaan Main Ghar Ghar Kheli as Swarnlata Raj Singhania.

Thapa has also done a few regional movies, such as 143 - I Love You in Odia, and has also appeared in Bengali and Bhojpuri films. In 2015, she debuted in Bollywood in a role as manager of an NGO in Prem Ratan Dhan Paayo.

As of September 2016, she is appearing in Sanyukt.

== Films ==
- 2004: I Love You (Odia film) as Gita
- 2005: To Pai
- 2005: Dulha Milal Dildaar
- 2005: Priya Mo Priya as Priya
- 2005: Bazi
- 2006: Prema Rutu Asila Re (Odia film)
- 2006: I Love My India as Sonia Mahapatra
- 2007: Mu Tote Love Karuchi
- 2007: Rasika Nagara as Priya / Mita
- 2008: Golmaal as Sangeeta
- 2008: Gharjamai
- 2009: Mitare Meeta as Nandini
- 2009: Abhisek Bhojpuri Film
- 2010: Knock Out (Hindi film) as Roshini
- 2011: 143 - I Love You as Sandhya
- 2014: Ganja Ladhei as Girl in a dance (special appearance)
- 2104: Sindura Odia Film
- 2015: Prem Ratan Dhan Payo (Hindi film) as NGO manager
- 2022: Honeymoon Punjabi Film
- 2023: Guddu Gangster Odia Film
- 2024: Racket Odia Film

== Television ==
- 2025 : Odisa Ra Best Cinestars Ra Khoj by Zee Sarthak - Reality Show - Judge
- 2025 : Raja Sundari By Siddharth Tv - Reality show - Judge
- 2015 : Adhikaar ek kasam ek tapasya
- 2012 : Savdhaan India as Maya Sameer Malhotra (Episode 704) / Neeta Verma (Episode 1132) / Mausami (Episode 1316)
- 2006-2009: Stree Teri Kahani as Tara
- 2009: Yahaan Main Ghar Ghar Kheli as Swarnlata Raj Singhania
- Mahima Shanidev Ki as Vikramaditya's wife
- 2007-08: Raavan as Sita
- 2007: Ssshhhh...Phir Koi Hai - Hospital as Inspector Putul (Episode 43)
- 2006: Vaidehi as Maithili
- 2001: Ssshhhh...Koi Hai - Doosri Dulhan as Nikita (Episode 18)
- 2001: Ssshhhh...Koi Hai - Woh Koun Thi as Sonia (Episode 14)
