= Varsha Priyadarshini =

Indian actress

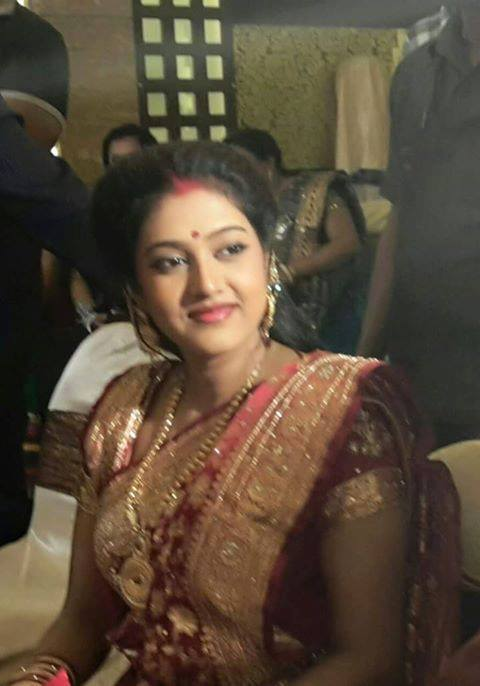
- Barsha Priyadarshini
- Born: 7 August 1984 (age 42); Cuttack, Orissa, India
- Other name: Barsha
- Education: Sailabala Women College
- Occupations: Actress; Politician
- Years active: 2001–present
- Height: 5 ft 6 in (168 cm)
- Political party: Biju Janata Dal (2024–present)
- Spouse: Anubhav Mohanty (m. 2014; div. 2023)

Varsha Priyadarshini (born 7 August 1984) is an Indian actress and politician who predominantly works in Odia-language films. She has also worked in Bengali films.

== Early life ==
Priyadarshini was born on 7 August 1984 in Cuttack, Odisha, India. She began her career as a fashion model before transitioning to acting at the age of 17.

== Marital life ==
Priyadarshini married Ollywood actor and BJD MP Anubhav Mohanty on 8 February 2014. The couple's marital discord began in less than six years of their marriage.

In July 2020, Mohanty filed a divorce petition in a Delhi-based court, alleging cruelty and non-consummation of the marriage, claiming there was no physical intimacy between them after the solemnisation of the marriage in 2014. Varsha had also filed a domestic violence case against Anubhav in a court in Cuttack, alleging physical, emotional, and economic abuse after their marriage.

On 22 September 2022, the family court rejected Anubhav's petition seeking a divorce. However, on 21 December 2023, the Orissa High Court overturned the family court's ruling and granted Mohanty a divorce decree under Section 13(1)(a) of the Hindu Marriage Act, 1955, establishing that he was treated with cruelty by his spouse. The High Court quashed the earlier ruling of the local family court and dissolved the marriage by a decree of divorce.

During their marital dispute, both parties utilised social media platforms to sling mud at each other publicly. In August 2022, a court in Cuttack upheld an order directing Priyadarshini to vacate her estranged husband's parental house in Cuttack city.

== Political career ==
In April 2024, Priyadarshini joined the Biju Janata Dal (BJD). She contested the Barchana constituency in the 2024 Legislative Assembly elections in Odisha but lost to Amar Kumar Nayak (BJP), who won with 71,926 votes

== Filmography ==
Year	Movie	Roles	Language(s)
2001	Baazi		Odia
2003	Ae Jugara Krushna Sudama		Odia
2003	Sabata Maa		Odia
2005	Tate Mo Rana		Odia
2005	Tu Mo Akhira Tara		Odia
2005	Thank You Bhagban		Odia
2007	E Mana Manena		Odia
2007	Agnisikha		Odia
2008	Nei Jaare Megha Mote		Odia
2008	Jor		Bengali
2008	Golmaal		Bengali
2008	Love Story		Bengali
2008	Takkar		Bengali
2009	Hanshi Khushi Club		Bengali
2010	Tapur Tupur Brishti Pore		Bengali
2011	Achena Prem		Bengali
2009	Suna Chadhei Mo Rupa Chadhei		Odia
2009	Dhire Dhire Prema Hela		Odia
2009	Prem Rogi		Odia
2010	Tu Thile Mo Dara Kahaku		Odia
2010	Subha Vivaha		Odia
2010	Aama Bhitare Kichhi Achhi		Odia
2010	Kiese Dakuchi Kouthi Mote		Odia
2010	Diwana		Odia
2011	Chhatire Lekhichi Tori Naa		Odia
2011	Balunga Toka		Odia
2011	Something Something		Odia
2012	Matric Fail		Odia
2012	Parshuram		Odia
2013	Prema Sabuthu Balaban		Odia
2013	Mo Duniya Tu Hi Tu		Odia
2013	Hata Dhari Chalutha		Odia
2013	Kehi Jane Bhala Lagere		Odia
2014	Something Something 2		Odia
2014	Mental		Odia
2015	Gapa Hele Bi Sata		Odia
2016	Gote Sua Gote sari		Odia
2016	Chhati Tale Ding Dong		Odia
2017	Romeo Juliet		Odia
2019	Nimki		Odia
2019	Queen		Odia
2021	Bijayinee		Odia
