= Suna Chadhei Mo Rupa Chadhei =

- Directed by: Himanshu Parija
- Written by: Prasant Jena
- Story by: Veeru Potla
- Produced by: Soumya Ranjan Patnaik & Ajit Misra
- Starring: Anubhav Mohanty; Barsha Priyadarshini; Siddhanta Mahapatra; Hari; Mihir Das
- Music by: Malay Mishra
- Distributed by: Balunkeshwar Films Pvt. Ltd.
- Release date: 15 February 2009
- Country: India
- Language: Odia

Suna Chadhei Mo Rupa Chadhei is a 2009 Indian Odia romantic film directed by Himanshu Parija. After Nei Ja Re Megha Mate, Anubhav Mohanty & Barsha Priyadarshini paired for second time in this film. The movie is a remake of 2005 Telugu movie Nuvvostanante Nenoddantana and was a commercial success.

== Plot ==
Raj (Anubhav Mohanty) is a rich, city boy, born to billionaire parents and brought up in London. On the other hand, Rani (Barsa Priyadarshini) is a traditional, simple desi girl from Odisha who is brought up by her only brother, Bijay (Siddhant Mahapatra). He is heartbroken when their father marries another woman and throws them out of the house, humiliating them on the way. Their mother dies and her tomb is built on the small land which they own until the landlord tells them that it is his land, since their mother had taken a loan from the man. Bijay volunteers to work day and night, to pay off the loan as long as they don't tear down his mother's tomb. The landlord agrees and the local station master helps them. Slowly Bijay and Rani grow up. One day, Shibani, Rani's best friend, comes to their house to invite Rani to their house as she is getting married. Shibani's cousin, Raj also arrives on the same day with his mother, Rajashree (Snigdha Mohanty).

Slowly Raj and Rani fall in love but Raj's mother does not bear it as Rani is not as rich as them, and is thus not to their standards; Raj is also to be married to Rajashree's brother's business partner's daughter, Rima. Rajashree humiliates Rani as well as Bijay, who arrives a minute before, and both are thrown of the house after Rajashree accuses them of trying to entice and trap Raj. When Raj learns of this, he goes to Rani's house and pleads to her brother to accept him. Bijay gives him a chance, just like he was given a chance by the landlord when he was little. Raj is tasked to take care of the cows, clean up after them and grow more crops than Bijay by the end of the season; if he does not, Raj will be thrown out of the village and can never see Rani again. The landlord and his son is not happy as the landlord's son wanted to marry Rani. With them and Rima and her father trying to get Raj to lose the competition, Raj has to work hard for his love, eating red chillies and rice everyday, even though he can't bear it. Through many antics from the landlord's side and Rima's side, Raj eventually proves his love for Rani to Bijay, and succeeds in growing more grains. However, landlord & his son kidnap Rani and then later tries to rape her. A fight takes place in which Raj kills the landlord's son. Bijay, after realizing that Raj and Rani should be together, takes the blame for this and spends five years in prison. The movie ends with Bijay's release from prison which is also when Rani and Raj get married, in everyone's presence. Rajashree then accepts Rani to be her daughter-in-law.

== Cast ==
- Anubhav Mohanty as Raj
- Barsa Priyadarshini as Rani
- Siddhanta Mahapatra as Bijay
- Mihir Das as Ranjit
- Snigdha Mohanty as Rajashree
- Hari
- Sunmeera Nagesh
