= Akash Dasnayak =

Indian Actor and politician from Odisha

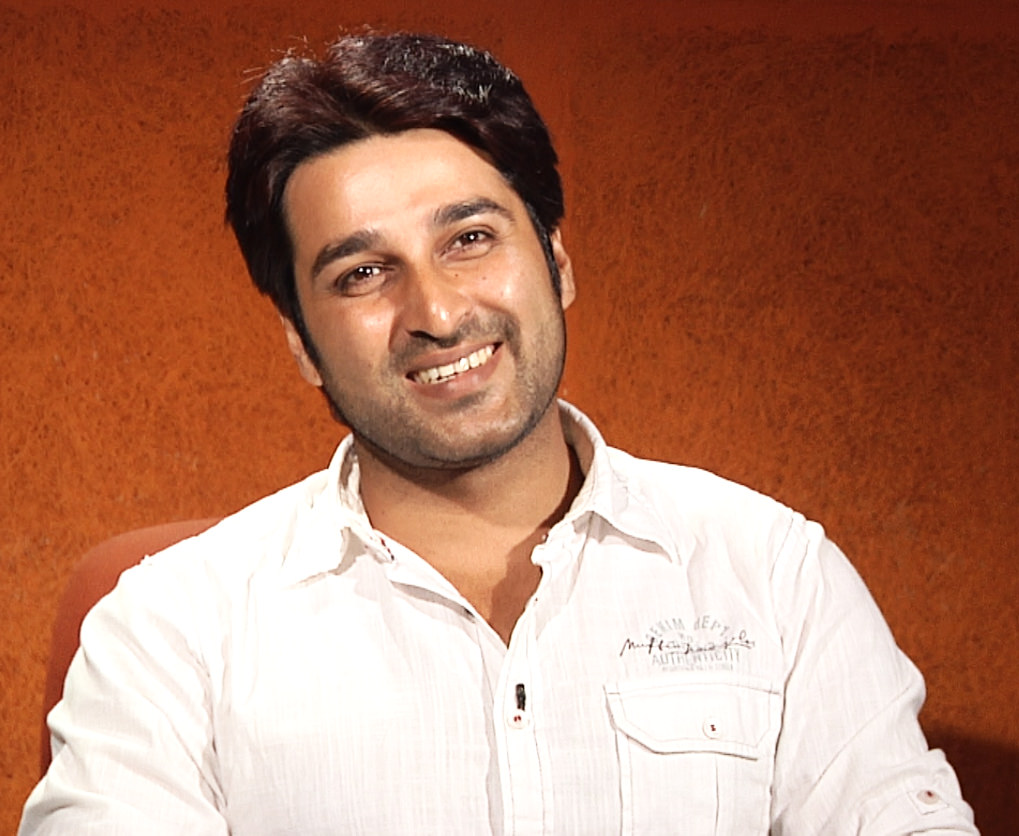
- Image of Akash Dasnayak

Member of the Odisha Legislative Assembly
- Incumbent
- Assumed office 2024
- In office 2014–2019
- Constituency: Korei

Personal details
- Born: Akash Das Nayak; 17 September 1981 (age 44) Jajpur, Odisha, India
- Party: Bharatiya Janata Party (2024 - present)
- Other political affiliations: Biju Janata Dal (2014-2024)
- Occupation: Actor, model
- Website: http://akashdasnayak.com/

Akash Dasnayak (born 17 September 1981), popularly known by the film industry name Akash, is an Odia film actor and politician known for doing action-oriented movies. He was also the MLA of Korei Constituency. He joined Bharatiya Janata Party on 1 April 2024 and will be contesting from Korei Assembly constituency.

== Personal life ==
He was born at Jajpur Road on 17 September 1981 in Odisha, India to Mayadhar Nayak and Indira Das. He graduated from Vyasanagar College, Jajpur Road (LLB) from Utkal University. His aunt Anita Das was a veteran film actress. He debuted in the Odia film industry in 2008 with film Kalinga Putra, receiving a Best Actor award. Since then, he has acted in several movies like Mita Basichi Bhoota Saathire and Just Mohabatt.

== Filmography ==
- Kalinga Putra (2008)
- Satya Meba Jayate (2008)
- Shatru Sanghar (2009)
- Subha Vivaha (2010)
- Asibu Kebe Saji Mo Rani (2010)
- Aalo Mora Kandhei (2010)
- Sangam (2012)
- Raju Awara (2012)
- Shapath (2012)
- Guru (2012)
- Khiladi (2013)
- Dharma (2013)
- Hari Om Hari (2013)
- Mita Basichi Bhoota Saathire (3D) (2013).
- Sangram (2015)
- Tu Kahibu Na Mu (2016)
- Agastya (2016)
- Just Mohabatt (2017)
- Herogiri (2019)
- Mahabahu (2022)

== Awards ==
- Best Actor award from Government of Odisha.
