= Anita Das =

Indian film and television actress (1953–2018)

- Born: 1 October 1953
- Died: 11 May 2018 (aged 64); Cuttack, Odisha, India
- Occupation: Actress
- Years active: 1975–2017
- Relatives: Akash Dasnayak (nephew)

Anita Das (1 October 1953 – 11 May 2018) was an Indian film and television actress in Odia cinema. She received three Odisha State Film Awards during her career.

== Career ==
Anita Das made her acting debut in 1975, in the Odia film, Jajabara where she played the lead role. She has predominantly appeared in more than a hundred movies since then, mostly in supporting roles as a mother. She was quite popular for essaying the role of a mother in most of her films after the 1980s.

Das received the Odisha State Film Award (Best Actress) for her acting in the film, Tapasya in 1980 and also received the prestigious award again for her lead role in the 1983 film, Bhakta Salabeg. She also won the Odisha State Film Award for Best supporting actress in 1987 for her performance in the film, Eai Ta Dunia.

== Death ==
On 10 May 2018, Das was reportedly complaining about her health conditions to her nephew Akash Dasnayak. She was suffering from vomiting and had heart and chest pains on Thursday night before going to sleep. Das was found dead the next day after Dasnayak rushed to call a doctor to consult her for treatment.

== Filmography ==
Year	Film
1975	Jajabara
1976	Krishna Sudama
1977	Bandhu Mohanty
1980	Ramayan
1980	Maa-o-Mamata
1980	Tapasya
1981	Kiye Jite Kiye Hare
1983	Swapna Sagara
1983	Bhakta Salabeg
1987	Suna Chadei
1987	Eai Ta Dunia
1991	Ki Heba Sua Posile
1994	Gadhi Janile Ghora Sundara
2002	Sindura Nuhein Khela Ghara
2003	Ae Jugara Krushna Sudama
2004	Saathire
2005	I Love You
2005	Agni Parikshya
2007	Mu Tate Love Karuchi
2007	To Bina Mo Kahani Adha
2007	Lakshmi Pratima
2008	Nandini I Love You
2008	Mate La Love Helare
2008	To Bina Bhala Lagena
2008	Munna-A Love Story
2009	Akashe Ki Ranga Lagila
2010	Swayamsiddha
2016	Bye Bye Dubai
2017	Abhaya
2017	Kabula Barabula
