= Sanjay Nayak =

Indian Oriya filmmaker (born 1975)

- Born: Sanjay; 2 March 1975 (age 51); Odisha, India
- Occupations: Director, producer
- Years active: 2002-Present

Sanjay Nayak is an Indian Odia filmmaker. He regarded as one of the most successful filmmakers in Odisha. Nayak, the young filmmaker has directed 32 movies in a short career of 15yrs in the film industry. He has also produced several movies under his production house 'Sanjay Nayak Films'. He not only directs but also write scripts, lyrics and does the screenplay. He produced and directed Keun Duniaru Asila Bandhu which is the first science fiction in Odia.

== Records ==
Sanjay Nayak is nominated for the Limca Book of World Records for making censor of two films Dil Tate Deichi and Sasura Ghara Jindabad of the same director, same producer, same actor and same cameraman on the same day. Nayak directed the two films which were produced by Uttam Chand Jain under his production house Top Films. Sabyasachi was the hero of these two movies. The cameraman was S. Ranjan. Such a record is unique and is believed first of its kind in world cinema.

In 2003, 2005 and 2008, 3 of his films released in each year which is a record in Indian cinema. Nayak has directed actor and MP Siddhanta Mahapatra continuously in 8 movies and has worked with him in 12 films in total.

== Skills ==
Sanjay Nayak is best known for his experiments in movies. He experimented with a hand in his first movie Rakhi Bandhili Mo Rakhiba Mana. He presented 100 scorpions in his 2nd movie Rahichi Rahibi Tori Pain. Then in Dharmara Heba Jaya and Tate Mo Rana he experimented with the leading male character. In Dharamara Heba Jaya, actor Siddhant Mohapatra portrayed the character of the blind while in Tate Mo Rana he portrayed the character of a soul when his character comes back even after his death. He experimented with a dog in Babu I love You, with a cow and sheep in To Bina Mo Kahani Adha, with the skeleton in De Maa Shakti De, with magic in To Payeen Nebi Mu Sahe Janama.

He directed Keun Duniaru Asila Bandhu under his own production house where he showed an alien first time in Oriya films. Nayak also showed child sentiments in his movies Rahichi Rahibi Tori Pain and To Pain Nebi Mu Sahe Janama were child actors Chandan and Piyali portrayed major characters respectively.

== Television ==
Sanjay Nayak has written a script for prime time serial Mausi on ETV ORIYA for 150 episodes. He has directed the serial Tike Khara Tike Chhai on Doordarshan Odia for 52 episodes.

== Awards ==
Sanjay Nayak has been awarded the best director on multiple occasions along with awards in the category of best scriptwriter, best story writer in his film career. Prominently, he was awarded the Odisha Film State Award for his movie Pagala Karichi Paunji Tora. He has been awarded by 'Chalachitra Jagat' & 'Banichitra' as Best Director on 5 different occasions. Overall, Sanjay has received more than 100 awards from different organizations for his body of work. Notably, Sanjay Nayak was awarded an honorary doctorate in 2018 for his contributions to cinema in Odisha. A few of his awards are listed below:

- Best Director for Rahichi Rahibi Tori Payeen in 2003
- Best Director for Sakhi Rahila Ae Singha Duara in 2004
- Best Director for Babu I love You in 2006
- Best Director for To Payeen Nebi Mu Sahe Janama in 2007
- Best Director for Mu Sapanara Soudagara in 2008
- Best Director for Keun Dunia Ru Asila Bandhu in 2009
- Best Director for Pagala Karichi Paunji Tora in 2009

== Filmography ==
- Rakhi Bandhili Mo Rakhiba Mana (2002)
- Rahichi Rahibi Tori Payeen (2003)
- Nari Akhire Niya (2003)
- Rakata Kahiba Kie Kahara (2003)
- Dharmara Heba Jaya (2004)
- Sakhi Rahila Ae Singha Duara (2004)
- Dharma Ra Heba Jai (2004)
- Tate mo Rana (2005)
- Premi No. 1 (2005)
- Tu mo Akhira Tara (2005)
- O My Love (2005)
- Babu I love You (2006)
- De Maa Shakti De (2006)
- To Bina Mo Kahani Adha (2007)
- To Payeen Nebi Mu Sahe Janama (2007)
- Mu Sapanara Soudagara (2008)
- Mate Ani Dela Lakhye Faguna (2008)
- Dhanare Rakhibu Sapatha Mora (2008)
- Keun Duniaru Asila Bandhu (2009)
- Pagala Karichi Paunji Tora (2009)
- Dil Tate Deichi (2010)
- Sasura Ghara Zindabad (2010)
- Megha Sabari Re Asiba Pheri (2010)
- Chhati Re Lekhichi Tori Na (2011)
- Baisi Pahacha Re Kheliba Meena (2011)
- Mita Basichi Mu Bhuta Sanga Re (2013)
- To Bata Chainchi Rati Sara (2014)
- Tume Thile Sathi Re (2014)
- Rangeela Baba (2015)
- Bhaina Kana Kala Se (2016)
- Nijhum Rati Ra Sathi (2017)
- Joker (Awaiting Release)
- Tu Achu Ta Mu Achi (Awaiting Release)
- Luchei De Mate Chhati Bhita Re (Awaiting Release)
- Prema Ra Rakhichi 100 Ru 100 (2019)
- To Pain Pheribi Mu Basudha Chiri (Awaiting Release)
