= Premi No.1 =

- Directed by: Sudhanshu Sahu
- Produced by: Basant Nayak
- Starring: Anubhav; Chandni; Bijay Mohanty
- Music by: Swarup Nayak
- Production company: Brajaraj Movies
- Release date: 2005
- Running time: 160 minutes
- Country: India
- Language: Odia

Premi No.1 (transl. Lover No. 1) is a 2005 Odia-language film directed by Sudhanshu Sahu. The film stars Anubhav, Chandni, and Bijay Mohanty. It is a remake of the 2003 Telugu film Dil starring Nithiin. It was re-released in February 2018, 13 years after its original release.

== Plot ==
The story of Premi No. 1 revolves around Sanjay. He was admitted to a college for higher studies, where he spots Pooja, the daughter of the town's famous gangster, Mahabahu. Coincidentally, Pooja is also admitted to that college. He saves her from the college rowdies after she is about to be ragged. The relationship between Sanjay and Pooja develops deeper, which angers her father. Mahabahu sends his goons to warn Sanjay's parents, leading to Sanjay retaliating against them and challenging Mahabahu, saying that he would be his son-in-law. Mahabahu lures Sanjay into a trap, leading to the latter getting badly injured. Determined to win Pooja's love, he elopes with Pooja and decides to get married, while Mahabahu tries to separate them. The rest is how Sanjay and Pooja get married.

== Cast ==
- Anubhav as Sanjay
- Chandni as Pooja
- Bijay Mohanty as Mahabahu Chhotray, Pooja's father
- Harihara Mohapatra as Sanjay's maternal uncle

== Soundtrack ==
- "Mu Khanti Odia Toka Premi No. 1." — Anubhav
- "E Sara Duniare Khiojile Paiba Nahin Mo Pari Premi" — Kumar Bapi and Tapu
- "Emiti Jhia Ku Mun Karichi Mo Priya" — Kumar Bapi
- "To Naan Re Mun Gote Geeta Lekhichi" — T. Souri and Tapu Mishra
- "Tu Nahin Kichi Mate Bhala Lagu Nahin O My Love" — Udit Narayan and Ira Mohanty
