= Anubhav Mohanty =

Indian actor and former social activist

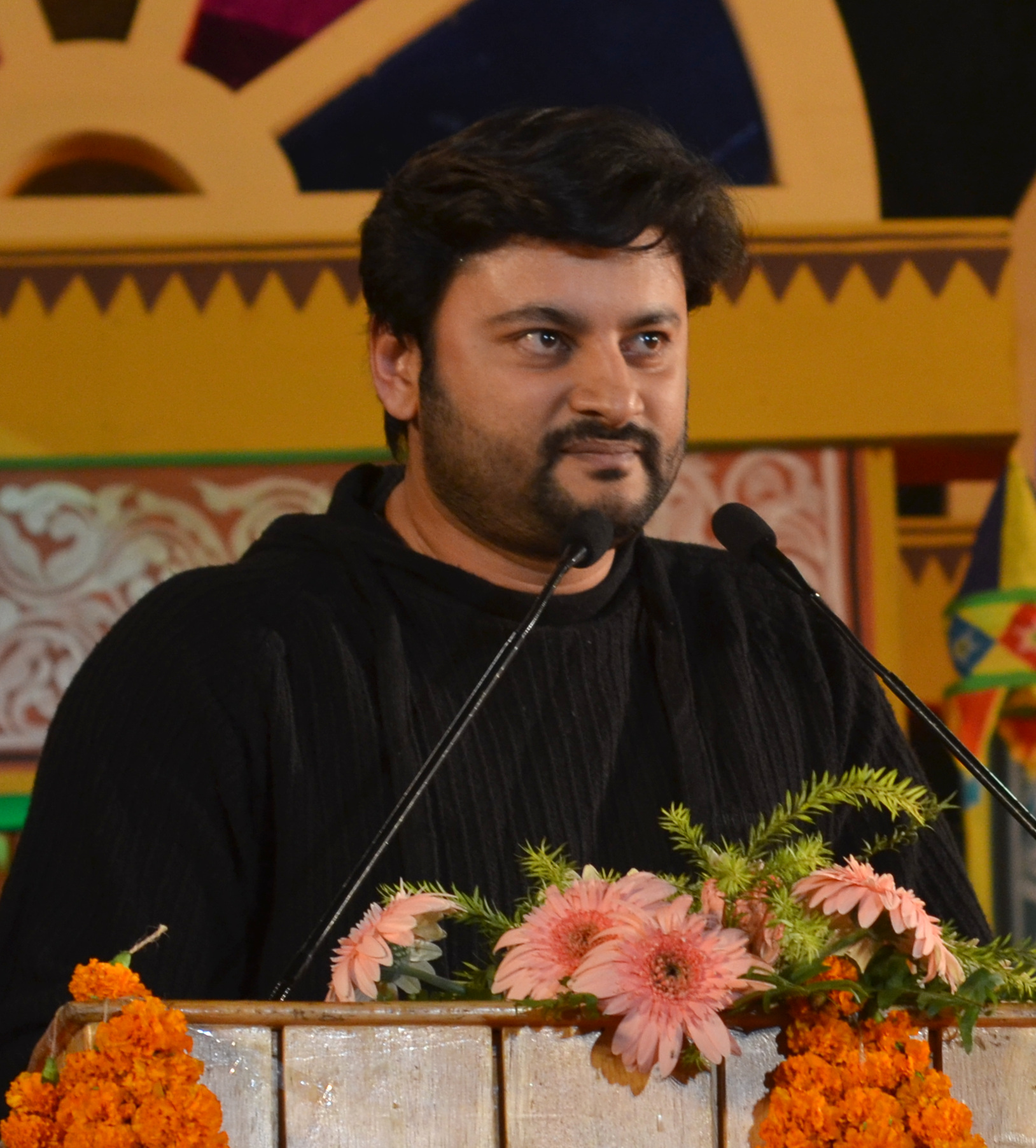
- Born: 24 December 1981 (age 44); Cuttack, Odisha, India
- Occupations: Actor; politician; producer
- Years active: 2004–present
- Works: List
- Political party: Bharatiya Janata Party
- Other political affiliations: Biju Janata Dal (April 2013 – March 2024)
- Spouse: Barsha Priyadarshini (m. 2014; div. 2023) Jagrati Shukla (m. 2025)
- Awards: List

Member of Parliament, Lok Sabha
- In office 23 May 2019 – March 2024
- Preceded by: Baijayant Panda
- Constituency: Kendrapara

Member of Parliament, Rajya Sabha
- In office 13 June 2014 – 22 May 2019
- Constituency: Odisha

Anubhav Mohanty (born 24 December 1981) is an Indian actor and social activist who is known for his work majorly in Odia language films. Mohanty has also worked in Bengali films.

== Film career ==
Anubhav Mohanty started his career by first appearing in Odia music videos before debuting in the Odia cinema in the 2004 film I Love You opposite Namrata Thapa. He had two other releases the same year, Saathire and Barsha My Darling. Afterwards, a number of his films such as Nei Jare Megha Mote (2008), Suna Chadhei Mo Rupa Chadhei (2009), Akashe Ki Ranga Lagila (2009), Abhimanyu (2009), Ama Bhitare Kichhi Achhi (2010), Diwana (2010), Kiese Dakuchhi Kouthi Mate (2011), Balunga Toka (2011), Something Something (2012), Matric Fail (2012), ACP Ranveer (2012), Mo Duniya Tu Hi Tu (2013), Haata Dhari Chaaluthaa (2013), Kehi Jane Bhala Lagere (2013), Something Something 2 (2014), Gapa Hele bi Sata (2015), Agastya (2016), Abhaya (2017), Kabula Barabula (2017), Prem Kumar: Salesman of the year (2018), Love in London (2023), Kuhudi (2024), Karma (2024), and Chardham (2025) were commercially successful.

In 2012, after the success of Balunga Toka, he created his own production house named Vishnupriyaa Arts & Graphics. The movie Something Something was the biggest hit of 2012. Mohanty made his debut in the Bengali film industry with the movie Saathi Amaar opposite Rachana Banerjee in a special appearance.

In 2019, Anubhav Mohanty starred in his most expensive Odia movie, Biju Babu, produced by Nila Madhab Panda, which did not do as well as expected at the box office due to some political controversy.

== Political career ==
On 27 April 2013, he joined the regional political party BJD. He was elected to Rajya Sabha uncontested in June 2014 and is the youngest parliamentarian of Rajyasabha. On 23 May 2019, he was elected as the member of Parliament from Kendrapara (Lok Sabha constituency) by beating the previously elected Baijayant Panda.

== Rajya Sabha ==
=== 2014 ===
Previous MP	Previous party	Elected MP	Elected party
Renubala Pradhan	BJD	Anubhav Mohanty	BJD

=== Lok Sabha ===
==== 2019 ====
Constituency	Turnout	Elected member	Party	Runner-up	Party	Margin
Kendrapara	72.23 ▼	Anubhav Mohanty	BJD	Baijayant Panda	BJP	152584

2024

30 March 2024, Anubhav Mohanty resigned from the Biju Janata Dal (BJD), citing personal reasons and a desire to continue serving the nation. In his resignation letter to BJD supremo Naveen Patnaik, he mentioned feeling "suffocated over the past four years" within the party. Shortly after, he joined the Bharatiya Janata Party (BJP) at the party's headquarters in New Delhi in 1 April 2024, praising Prime Minister Narendra Modi's leadership and vision. He stated that his decision was driven by his admiration for Modi's dynamic governance and his belief in the BJP's developmental agenda ahead of the 2024 general elections.

== Filmography ==
Key
†	Denotes films that have not yet been released

- All films are in Odia, unless otherwise noted.

Year	Film	Role	Notes	Ref.
2004	I Love You	Sanjay	Debut film	
2004	Topae Sindoora Di Topa Luha	Gourav	Extended cameo	
2004	Saathire	Raju Mahapatra		
2004	Nayak Nuhen Khalnayak	Akash Mahanty		
2005	Priya Mo Priya	Raja		
2005	Barsa My Darling			
2005	Prathama Prema	Sandip Mahapatra		
2005	Arjuna	Arjun Mohanty		
2005	Premi No.1	Sanjay		
2005	Khalnayak	Akash		
2005	Sathi Amar		Bengali film	
2006	Thank U Bhagban	Jaga / Kalia	Dual role	
2006	Swarthopar		Bengali film	
2006	Eri Naam Prem	Akash	Bengali film	
2006	Jiban Sathi		Bengali film	
2007	Mahanayak	Rohit Rai		
2007	Kalishankar	Shankar	Bengali-Odia film	
2007	To Bina Mo Kahani Adhaa	Arun		
2008	Dhana Re Rakhibu Sapatha Mora	Shankar		
2008	Chup Kie Aasuchhi			
2008	Mate Ta Love Helare	Akash		
2008	Chaati Chiri Dele Tu	Mahaveer		
2008	Munna-A Love Story	Munna		
2008	Aa Janhare Lekhiba Naa	Om		
2009	Nei Jaa Re Megha Mate	Raju / Rahul		
2009	Suna Chadhei Mo Rupa Chadhei	Raj	25th film	
2009	Akashe Ki Ranga Lagila	Akash		
2009	Saata Sure Bandha Ae Jibana	Raj		
2009	Abhimanyu	Abhimanyu Samanth		
2010	Don	Shanu		
2010	Aama Bhitare Kichhi Achhi	Sidharth Rai		
2010	Mu Kana Ete Kharap	Kanha		
2010	Deewana	Dilu Patnaik		
2011	Most Wanted	Baba / Abhaya Mohanty	Dual role	
2011	Kiese Dakuchhi Kouthi Mote	Abhijeet		
2011	Balunga Toka	Chiku		
2012	Something Something	Sriram	Also producer and co-writer	
2012	Matric Fail	Chiku		
2012	ACP Ranveer	ACP Ranveer Singh		
2013	Mo Duniya Tu Hi Tu	Hira		
2013	Haata Dhari Chaaluthaa	Sai		
2013	Kehi Jane Bhala Lagere	Prince Mahapatra		
2014	Something Something 2	Sriram		
2014	Mental	Romeo		
2015	Gapa Hele Bi Sata	Akash		
2015	Jaga Hatare Pagha	Krishna / Jaga	Dual role	
2016	Gote Sua Gote Sari	Lalatendu Barik / Lalua		
2016	Agastya	Agastya		
2016	Baby			
2017	Abhaya	Abhaya		
2017	Kabula Barabula	Kabula	50th film	
2018	Prem Kumar: Salesman of the Year	Prem Kumar		
2019	Biju Babu	Babu		
2023	R.A.M		Special appearance in a song	
2023	Love in London	Prem		
2024	Bigul		Cameo appearance	
2024	Kuhudi	Anshuman Pattnaik		
2024	Karma	Amar Pattnaik		
2025	Charidham - A Journey Within	Abhiram Mohanty		
2026	Chhaki Suna	ACP Bhanu Pratap		
2026	RAA'V'AN	Bheema	5+ roles In Part 1	

== Awards and nominations ==
Year	Film	Award	Category	Result	Ref(s)
2010	Akashe Ki Ranga Lagila	Annual Banichitra Cine Awards	Best Actor (Male)	Won	
2010	Abhimanyu	Tarang Cine Awards	Best Actor (Male)	Won	
2011	Akashe Ki Ranga Lagila	Odisha State Film Awards	Best Actor	Won	
2011	Diwana	Etv Odia Film Awards	Best Actor	Won	
2012	Balunga Toka	Tarang Cine Awards	Best Actor (Male)	Won	
2012	Balunga Toka	Etv Odia Film Awards	Best Actor	Won	
2012	Balunga Toka	Lalchand Entertainment Awards	Best Actor	Won	
2012	Balunga Toka	Odisha Film Fair Awards	Best Actor	Won	
2013	Something Something	Tarang Cine Awards	Best Actor (Male)	Won	
2014	Haata Dhari Chaaluthaa	Tarang Cine Awards	Best Actor (Male)	Won	
2014	Haata Dhari Chaaluthaa	Filmfare Awards East	Best Actor (Male)	Nominated	
2014	Mo Duniya Tu Hi Tu	Filmfare Awards East	Best Actor (Male)	Nominated	
2015	Something Something 2	Tarang Cine Awards	Best Actor (Male)	Won	
2018	Abhaya	Tarang Cine Awards	Star Entertainer of the Year	Won	

=== Other awards, nominations, and recognitions ===
- 2004–05: Rajiv Gandhi Pratibha Samman

== Personal life ==
Mohanty married Jagruti Shukla in 2025. She is his second wife, after he divorced Varsha Priyadarshini, whom he married on 8 February 2014.

Mohanty's first marriage faced significant challenges when Priyadarshini filed a domestic violence case against him in 2020, alleging harassment. In response, he filed for divorce in July 2020, leading to a highly publicised legal battle. The couple's disputes were widely reported in the media, including court orders that restricted them from making public comments about each other.

The Orissa High Court ruled in his favour, granting him a decree for divorce, and denying his wife permanent alimony, due to her conduct.
