= Debu Bose =

Indian actor and former Dancer

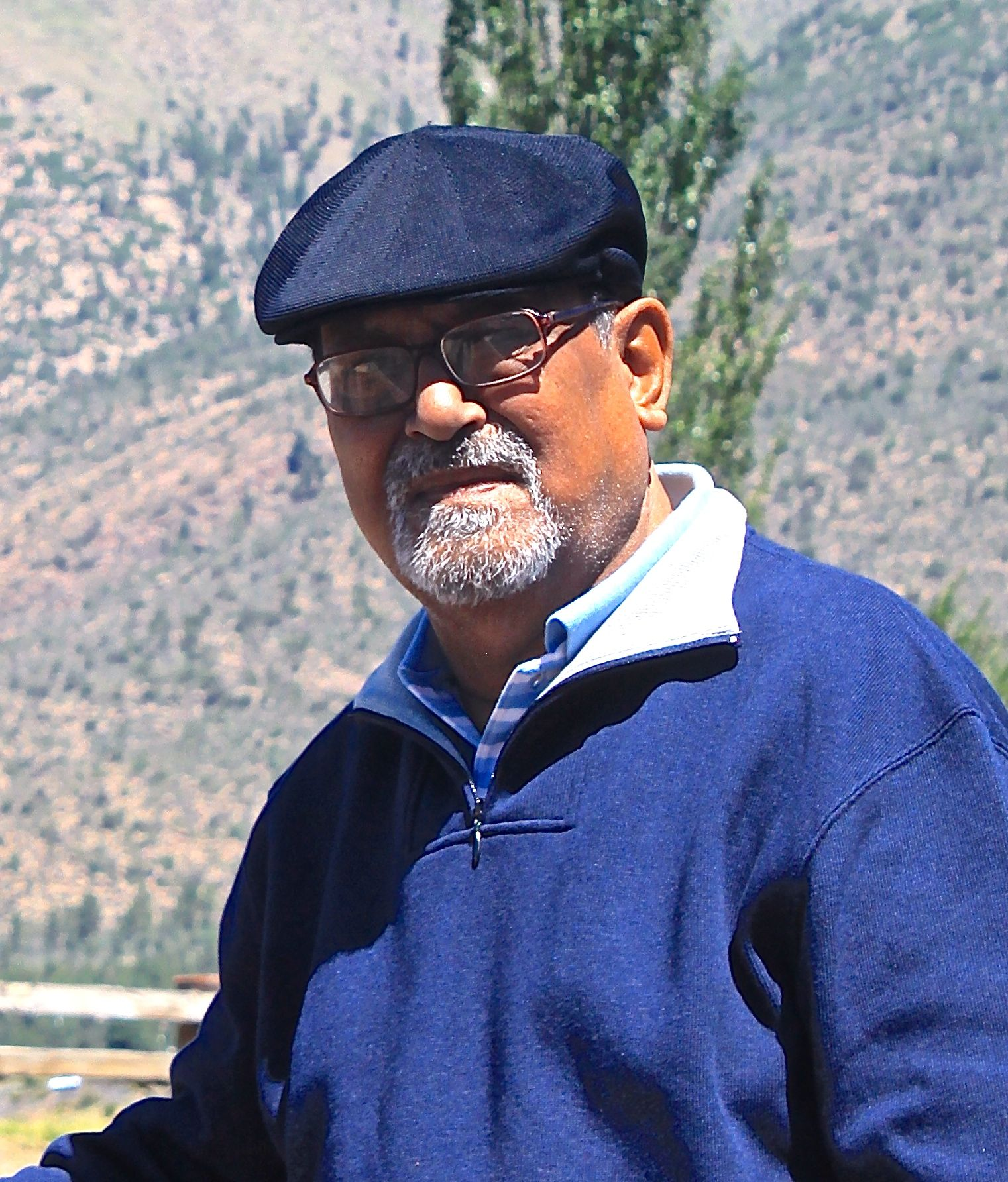
- Debu Bose in 2013
- Born: 2 December 1942; British India
- Died: 22 August 2018 (aged 75); Hyderabad, Telangana, India
- Other name: Debu Da
- Occupation: Actor
- Years active: 1974–2018

Debu Bose was an Indian actor and former dancer. He made his debut in the film Tapasya in 1980. He has acted in over 120 movies within his career, spanning over four decades.

== Early life ==
He was born on 2 December 1942 in a Kayastha family at Odisha during the British Raj. When he was pursuing his college degree in Berhampur, he was a member of Ganjam Kala Parishad. During this period, he participated in several dance dramas. He was interested in dance, so Bose took classical dance training under legendary Odissi dancer Kelucharan Mohapatra.

== Career ==
Bose started his career as a dancer and assistant choreographer in Mana Akasha, directed by Nitai Palit in 1974. He had been known for works in films like Samay Kheluchhi Chaka Bhaunri, Ki Heba Sua Posile, Pua Moro Kala Thakura, Phula Chandana, Kaberi, Sahari Bagha and Suna Chadhei. His last film was Raasta, which was released in 2014. Bose had been associated with regional theatre group Diganta, and also directed several plays.

== Death ==
While undergoing treatment, Bose died due to a cardiac arrest at a private hospital in Hyderabad on 22 August 2018. This was not the first time he fell ill as he had suffered cardiac arrests on two occasions in the past. The Ollywood movie fraternity had expressed its deep condolence in his death and dubbed it as an irreparable loss.
