= List of films: T =

indexed lists of films
0–9	A	B	C	D	E	F
G	H	I	J–K	L	M	N–O
P	Q–R	S	T	U–V–W	X–Y–Z	

This is an alphabetical list of film articles (or sections within articles about films). It includes made for television films. See the talk page for the method of indexing used.

== T ==
- T2 (2009)
- T2 Trainspotting (2017)
- T-34 (2019)
- T-Force (1994)
- T-Men (1947)
- T-Rex: Back to the Cretaceous (1998)

=== Ta ===
- Ta chvíle, ten okamžik (1981)
- Ta Khar Ta Yan Nite A Chit The Ei Tho Phit Tat The (2004)
- Ta kitrina gantia (1960)
- Ta Kyawt Hna Kyawt Tay Ko Thi (1971)
- Ta Oo Ka Saytanar Ta Oo Ka Myittar (1976)
- Ta Pyi Thu Ma Shwe Htar (1994)
- Ta Ra Rum Pum (2007)

==== Taa–Taj ====
- Taal (1999)
- Taala Te Kunjee (2017)
- Taan (2014)
- Taana (2020)
- Taanakkaran (2022)
- Taaqat (1995)
- Taaqatwar (1989)
- Taar (2020)
- Taarak (2003)
- Taare Zameen Par (2007)
- Taarkata (2014)
- Taaro Thayo (2025)
- Taarzan: The Wonder Car (2004)
- Taawdo the Sunlight (2017)
- Tab Hunter Confidential (2015)
- Tabaluga (2018)
- Tabarana Kathe (1987)
- Tabarin (1958)
- Tabasco Road (1957)
- Tabataba (1988)
- Tabbaliyu Neenade Magane (1977)
- Tabi no Omosa (1972)
- Tabi wa Kimagure Kaze Makase (1958)
- Tabite or Not Tabite (2005)
- The Table (1973)
- Table 19 (2017)
- Table No. 21 (2013)
- Table for Five (1983)
- Table for Six (2022)
- Table for Three (2009)
- Tabloid (2010)
- Taboo: (1980, 1999 & 2002)
- Tabu (2012)
- Tabu: A Story of the South Seas (1931)
- Tabunungda Akaiba Likli (2013)
- Tackle Happy (2000)
- Tacones lejanos (1991)
- Tad, The Lost Explorer (2012)
- Tad the Lost Explorer and the Secret of King Midas (2017)
- Tad, the Lost Explorer and the Emerald Tablet (2022)
- Tad's Swimming Hole (1918)
- Tada's Do-It-All House (2011)
- Tadakha (2013)
- Tadap (2021)
- Tadka (2021)
- Tadoussac (2017)
- Tadpole (2002)
- Tadpole and the Whale (1988)
- Taegukgi: The Brotherhood of War (2004)
- Taffy and the Jungle Hunter (1965)
- Tag: (2015 & 2018)
- Tag: The Assassination Game (1982)
- Tag der Freiheit: Unsere Wehrmacht (1935)
- Tag und Nacht (2010)
- Taggart (1964)
- Tagaru Palya (2023)
- Tagore (2003)
- Tahader Katha (1992)
- Tahara (2020)
- Tahiti Nights (1944)
- Tahmina (1993)
- Tahrir 2011: The Good, the Bad, and the Politician (2011)
- Tahsildar Gari Ammayi (1971)
- Tai Chi 0 (2012)
- Tai Chi Boxer (1996)
- Tai Chi Hero (2012)
- Tai Chi Master (1993)
- Tai-Pan (1986)
- Taiga: (1958 & 1992)
- Taiikukan Baby (2008)
- Tail Gunner Joe (1977 TV)
- Tail Lights Fade (1999)
- Tail Spin (1939)
- Tail of a Tiger (1984)
- Tailcoat for Scapegrace (1979)
- The Tailor of Panama (2001)
- Tainá: An Adventure in the Amazon (2000)
- Tainá 2: A New Amazon Adventure (2004)
- Tainá 3: The Origin (2011)
- Tainted (1987)
- Tainted Money (1924)
- Taintlight (2009)
- Taivas tiellä (2000)
- Taiyō o Nusunda Otoko (1979)
- Taj Mahal: (1941, 1963, 1995, 1999, 2008 & 2015)
- Taj Mahal: An Eternal Love Story (2005)

==== Tak ====
- Tak Jhal Mishti (2002)
- Taka (2004)
- Takatak (2019)
- Takatak 2 (2022)
- Take (2007)
- The Take: (1974, 2004 & 2007)
- Take 2 (2017)
- Take Aim (1974)
- Take Aim at the Police Van (1960)
- Take All of Me (1976)
- Take Away (2003)
- Take Back (2021)
- Take Care (2014)
- Take Care of Amelia (1925)
- Take Care of Amelie (1932)
- Take Care Good Night (2018)
- Take Care of Maya (2023)
- Take Care of My Cat (2001)
- Take Care of My Little Girl (1951)
- Take Care of Your Scarf, Tatiana (1994)
- Take Diversion (2022)
- Take Down (1979)
- Take Heed Mr. Tojo (1943)
- Take Her, She's Mine (1963)
- Take It Big (1944)
- Take It Easy (2015)
- Take It Easy Urvashi (1996)
- Take the Lead (2006)
- Take Me (2017)
- Take Me Home: (1928, 2011 & 2026)
- Take Me Home Tonight (2011)
- Take Me Out to the Ball Game (1949)
- Take Me to the River: (2014 & 2015)
- Take the Money and Run (1969)
- Take My Eyes (2003)
- Take One False Step (1949)
- Take Out (2004)
- Take Shelter (2011)
- Take This Job and Shove It (1981)
- Take This Waltz (2011)
- Taken series:
  - Taken (2008)
  - Taken 2 (2012)
  - Taken 3 (2014)
- Taken Away (1989)
- Takeover: (1988 & 2026)
- The Takeover (1995)
- Takers (2010)
- Taking Care of Business (1990)
- Taking Chances (2009)
- The Taking of Deborah Logan (2014)
- Taking Father Home (2005)
- Taking Lives (2004)
- Taking Off (1971)
- The Taking of Pelham 123 (2009)
- The Taking of Pelham One Two Three: (1974 & 1998 TV)
- The Taking of Power by Louis XIV (1966 TV)
- Taking Sides (2002)
- Taking Tiger Mountain (1983)
- The Taking of Tiger Mountain (2014)
- Taking Tiger Mountain by Strategy (1970)
- Taking Woodstock (2009)

==== Tal ====
- Talea (2013)
- Tale About the Lost Time (1964)
- The Tale of Despereaux (2008)
- The Tale of the Fox (1937)
- A Tale of Love and Darkness (2015)
- Tale of the Mummy (1998)
- The Tale of the Priest and of His Workman Balda (1933-1936)
- The Tale of the Princess Kaguya (2013)
- Tale of the Rally (2014)
- A Tale of Springtime (1990)
- Tale of Tales: (1979 & 2015)
- The Tale of Tsar Saltan: (1966 & 1984)
- A Tale of Two Cities: (1911, 1922, 1935, 1958 & 1980 TV)
- A Tale of Two Critters (1977)
- A Tale of Two Kitties (1942)
- A Tale of Two Sisters: (1989 & 2003)
- A Tale of Winter (1992)
- The Tale of Zatoichi (1962)
- The Talented Mr. Ripley (1999)
- Tales From the Crypt (1972)
- Tales from the Dark 1 (2013)
- Tales from the Dark 2 (2013)
- Tales From the Darkside: The Movie (1990)
- Tales From Earthsea (2006)
- Tales from the Gimli Hospital (1988)
- The Tales of Hoffmann: (1923 & 1951)
- Tales from the Hood (1995)
- Tales from the Hood 2 (2018)
- Tales from the Hood 3 (2020)
- Tales of Halloween (2015)
- Tales of Manhattan (1942)
- Tales of Mystery (2015)
- Tales of Ordinary Madness (1981)
- Tales of Terror (1963)
- Tales That Witness Madness (1973)
- Talk (1994)
- Talk to Her (2002)
- Talk to Me (2007 & 2022)
- Talk Radio (1988)
- Talk Straight: The World of Rural Queers (2003)
- The Talk of the Town (1942)
- Talkin' Dirty After Dark (1991)
- A Talking Picture (2003)
- The Tall Blond Man with One Black Shoe (1972)
- Tall Girl (2019)
- Tall Girl 2 (2022)
- The Tall Guy (1989)
- The Tall Man: (2011 & 2012)
- The Tall Men (1955)
- Tall in the Saddle (1944)
- The Tall T (1957)
- Tall Tale (1995)
- Talladega Nights: The Ballad of Ricky Bobby (2006)
- Los tallos amargos (1956)
- Tallulah (2016)

==== Tam ====
- Tam-Lin (1970)
- Tamaar Padaar (2014)
- Tamacha (1988)
- Tamagotchi: The Movie (2007)
- Tamagotchi: Happiest Story in the Universe! (2008)
- Tamako Love Story (2014)
- Tamako in Moratorium (2013)
- Tamala 2010: A Punk Cat in Space (2002)
- Tamanna: (1942, 1997 & 2014)
- Tamara: (2005, 2016 French & 2016 Venezuelan)
- Tamara Drewe (2010)
- Tamara and the Ladybug (2016)
- Tamarind Juice (2019)
- The Tamarind Seed (1974)
- Tamas (1988) (TV)
- Tamasha: (1952 & 2015)
- Tamatama (2011)
- También de dolor se canta (1950)
- Tamboo Mein Bamoo (2001)
- The Tambour of Retribution (2020)
- Tamburo (2017)
- Tame Keva? (2018)
- Taming of the Fire (1972)
- Taming the Garden (2021)
- The Taming of the Scoundrel (1980)
- The Taming of the Shrew: (1908, 1929, 1942, 1962 TV, 1967 & 1973 TV)
- The Taming of the Shrewd (2022)
- The Taming of the Snood (1940)
- The Taming of Sunnybrook Nell (1914)
- The Taming of the West: {1925 & 1939)
- Taming the Wild (1936)
- Tamizh Padam 2 (2018)
- Tammy series:
  - Tammy and the Bachelor (1957)
  - Tammy Tell Me True (1961)
  - Tammy and the Doctor (1963)
- Tammy (2014)
- Tammy and the T-Rex (1994)
- Tammy's Always Dying (2019)
- Tampico (1944)
- Tampopo (1985)

==== Tan ====
- Tana (1958)
- Tanah Surga... Katanya (2012)
- Tandav (2014)
- Tandava Krishnudu (1984)
- Tandem (1987)
- Tandra Paparayudu (1986)
- Tanga - Deu no New York Times? (1987)
- Tangerine (2015)
- The Tangerine Bear (2000)
- Tangerines (2013)
- Tangier: (1946 & 1982)
- Tangier Incident (1953)
- Tangled: (2001 & 2010)
- Tangled Destinies (1932)
- Tangled Hearts (1916)
- Tangles (2026)
- Tango: (1936, 1969, 1981, 1993 & 1998)
- ¡Tango! (1933)
- Tango Bar (1987)
- The Tango on Broadway (1934)
- Tango & Cash (1989)
- Tango Charlie (2005)
- Tango Feroz (1993)
- The Tango Lesson (1997)
- Tango libre (2012)
- Tango with Me (2010)
- Tango Notturno (1937)
- The Tango of Our Childhood (1984)
- Tango Shalom (2021)
- Tango Tangles (1914)
- A Tango Tragedy (1914)
- Tangos Are for Two (1998)
- Tangos, the Exile of Gardel (1986)
- Tangra Blues (2021)
- Tangsir (1973)
- Tanguy (2001)
- Tanhaji (2020)
- Tania, the Beautiful Wild Girl (1948)
- Tank (1984)
- Tank 432 (2015)
- Tank Battalion (1958)
- Tank Brigade (1955)
- Tank Commando (1959)
- Tank Girl (1995)
- Tank Malling (1989)
- Tanker "Derbent" (1941)
- Tankers (2018)
- Tankhouse (2022)
- The Tanks Are Coming: (1941 & 1951)
- Tanks a Million (1941)
- Tanna (2015)
- Tanned Legs (1929)
- Tannenberg (1932)
- Tanner (1985)
- Tanner Hall (2009)
- Tanner on Tanner (2004)
- The Tannhof Women (1934)
- Tansen (1943)
- Tansy (1921)
- Tantra (2024)
- Tanvi the Great (2025)
- Tanya (1940)
- Tanya's Island (1980)

==== Tao–Tar ====
- The Tao of Steve (2000)
- Taoism Drunkard (1984)
- Tap (1989)
- Tapaal (2014)
- Tapana (2004)
- Tapas (2005)
- Tapasya (1976)
- Tapasya (1991)
- Tape: (2001 & 2020)
- Taped (2012)
- Tapeheads (1988)
- Tapeworm (2019)
- Tapped (2009)
- Tapped Out (2014)
- Taps (1981)
- Taqdeer: (1943 & 1983)
- Taqdeer Ka Badshah (1982)
- Taqdeer Ka Tamasha (1990)
- Taqdeerwala (1995)
- Taqwacore (2009)
- The Taqwacores (2010)
- Tár (2022)
- Tar Angel (2001)
- Tar Creek (2009)
- Tar Tay Gyi (2017)
- Tara: (2001 & 2010)
- Tara Road (2005)
- Tarak (2017)
- Taraka Ramudu (1997)
- Taramani (2017)
- Tarana (1951)
- Tarang (1984)
- Tarantella: (1940 & 1995)
- Tarantula (1955)
- Tarantulas: The Deadly Cargo (1977 TV)
- Tarap (2006)
- Taras Bulba: (1909, 1924, 1936, 1962 & 2009)
- Taras Bulba, the Cossack (1962)
- Taras Shevchenko (1951)
- Taray at Teroy (1988)
- Taraz (2016)
- Target: (1952, 1979, 1985, 1995, 2004, 2010 & 2014)
- Target Earth (1954)
- Target: Harry (1969)
- Target Hong Kong (1953)
- Target Kolkata (2013)
- Target: Maganto (1988)
- Target Nevada (1951)
- Target Number One (2020)
- Target: Sparrow Unit (1987)
- Target Tokyo (1945)
- Targets (1968)
- Taris, roi de l'eau (1931)
- Tarka the Otter (1979)
- Tarnation (2003)
- Tarot (2024)
- Tart (2001)
- Tartarin of Tarascon: (1934 & 1962)
- Tartuffe: (1926 & 1965 TV)
- Tarzan: (1999 & 2013)
- Tarzan II (2005)
- Tarzan & Jane (2002)
- Tarzoon: Shame of the Jungle (1979)

==== Tas–Taz ====
- Tasay Par Lar Pyi (2018)
- Tashan (2008)
- The Task (2012)
- Task Force (1949)
- Taste the Blood of Dracula (1970)
- Taste of Cherry (1997)
- Taste of China (2015)
- A Taste of Honey (1961)
- The Taste of Others (2000)
- The Taste of Tea (2004)
- Tata Birla (1996)
- Tata Birla Madhyalo Laila (2006)
- Tatamma Kala (1974)
- Tatanka (2011)
- Tatar Ka Chor (1940)
- Tate's Voyage (1998)
- Tater Tot & Patton (2017)
- Tati (1973)
- Tatie Danielle (1990)
- Tatjana (1923)
- Tatsu (1994)
- Tatsumi (2011)
- Tattooed Life (1965)
- The Tattooist (2007)
- Tatu (2017)
- Tatuagem (2013)
- Tatyana's Day (1967)
- Tau (2015)
- Tauba Tauba (2004)
- Tauba Tera Jalwa (2024)
- Taur Mittran Di (2012)
- Taurus (2001)
- Taw Kyi Kan (2017)
- Tawaif (1985)
- Tawny Pipit (1944)
- Tax Collector (1997)
- The Tax Collector (2020)
- Taxa K 1640 efterlyses (1956)
- Taxandria (1994)
- Taxi (1953)
- Taxi (1996)
- Taxi (2004)
- Taxi (2015)
- Taxi series:
  - Taxi (1998)
  - Taxi 2 (2000)
  - Taxi 3 (2003)
  - Taxi 4 (2007)
  - Taxi 5 (2018)
- Taxi! (1932)
- Taxi! Taxi! (1927)
- Taxi! Taxi! (2013)
- Taxi!!! (1978 TV)
- Taxi 13 (1928)
- Taxi Ballad (2011)
- Taxi Beirut (2011)
- Taxi Blues (1990)
- Taxi Car (1972)
- Taxi Chor (1980)
- Taxi to the Dark Side (2007)
- Taxi Driver (1954)
- Taxi Driver (1976)
- Taxi Driver (1977)
- Taxi Driver (1978)
- A Taxi Driver (2017)
- Taxi Driver: Oko Ashewo (2015)
- Taxi Girl (1977)
- The Aerial Cabman (1943)
- Taxi nach Kairo (1987)
- Taxi zum Klo (1981)
- Taxi Lovers (2005)
- Taxi at Midnight (1929)
- Taxi, Mister (1943)
- Taxi No. 9211 (2006)
- Taxi to Paradise (1933)
- Taxi Ramudu (1961)
- Taxi, Roulotte et Corrida (1958)
- Taxi for Two (1929)
- Taxi-Kitty (1950)
- Taxidermia (2006)
- A Taxing Woman (1987)
- Taxman (1999)
- Tayaramma Bangarayya (1979)
- Taylor's Wall (2001)
- Tazza: One Eyed Jack (2019)
- Tazza: The Hidden Card (2014)
- Tazza: The High Rollers (2006)

=== Tc ===
- TC 2000 (1993)
- Tchaikovsky (1970)
- Tchaikovsky's Wife (2022)
- Tchin-Chao, the Chinese Conjurer (1904)

=== Te ===
==== Tea–Ted ====
- Tea with the Dames (2018)
- Tea in the Harem (1985)
- Tea Kadai Raja (2016)
- Tea Leaves in the Wind (1938)
- Tea with Mussolini (1999)
- Tea and Sympathy (1956)
- Tea for Three (1927)
- Tea Time in the Ackerstrasse (1926)
- Tea for Two (1950)
- Tea for Two Hundred (1948)
- Teacher of the Year: (2014 & 2019)
- Teacher's Beau (1935)
- Teacher's Pests (1932)
- Teacher's Pet: (1930, 1958, 2004 & 2026)
- Teacheramma (1968)
- Teachers (1984)
- Teaching Mrs. Tingle (1999)
- The Teahouse of the August Moon (1956)
- Team America: World Police (2004)
- Team Batista no Eikō (2008)
- Team Foxcatcher (2016)
- Team Spirit (2016)
- Teamster Boss: The Jackie Presser Story (1992 TV)
- Tear This Heart Out (2008)
- Tearin' Into Trouble (1927)
- Tearing Through (1925)
- Tears (2000)
- Tears of the Black Tiger (2000)
- Tears in the Fabric (2014)
- Tears for Sale (2008)
- Tears and Smiles (1917)
- Tears of the Sun (2003)
- Tears Were Falling (1982)
- Techqua Ikachi, Land - My Life (1989)
- Ted (2012)
- Ted 2 (2015)
- Ted Bundy (2002)
- Ted Bundy: American Boogeyman (2021)
- Ted & Venus (1991)
- Teddy (2021)
- Teddy Bear: (1981 & 2012)
- Teddy Bears' Picnic (2002)
- Teddy, the Rough Rider (1940)
- Teddy at the Throttle (1917)
- Teddy's Christmas (2022)

==== Tee ====
- Teecha Baap Tyacha Baap (2011)
- Teefa in Trouble (2018)
- Teen Adkun Sitaram (2023)
- Teen-Age Crime Wave (1955)
- Teen-Age Strangler (1964)
- Teen Bahuraniyan (1968)
- Teen Batti Char Raasta (1953)
- Teen Bayka Fajiti Aika (2012)
- Teen Beach Movie (2013)
- Teen Beach 2 (2015)
- Teen Bhubaner Pare (1969)
- Teen Cheharey (1979)
- Teen Devian (1965)
- Teen Ghumti (2016)
- Teen Kanya (1961)
- Teen Knight (1999)
- Teen Lust (1979)
- Teen Lust (2014)
- Teen Maar (2011)
- Teen Murti (1984)
- Teen Patti (2010)
- Teen Sau Din Ke Baad (1938)
- Teen Spirit (2011 TV)
- Teen Spirit (2018)
- Teen Thay Bhai (2011)
- Teen Titans movies:
  - Teen Titans: Trouble in Tokyo (2006 TV)
  - Teen Titans: The Judas Contract (2017)
  - Teen Titans Go! To the Movies (2018)
- Teen Witch (1989)
- Teen Wolf (1985)
- Teen Wolf Too (1987)
- Teen Yaari Katha (2012)
- Teenage (2013 American)
- Teenage (2013 Indian)
- Teenage Badass (2020)
- Teenage Bonnie and Klepto Clyde (1993)
- Teenage Caveman: (1958 & 2002)
- Teenage Cocktail (2016)
- Teenage Devil Dolls (1955)
- Teenage Dirtbag (2009)
- Teenage Doll (1957)
- Teenage Exorcist (1994)
- Teenage Father (1978)
- Teenage Hitchhikers (1975)
- Teenage Kicks (2016)
- Teenage Millionaire (1961)
- Teenage Monster (1957)
- Teenage Mother (1967)
- Teenage Mutant Ninja Turtles series:
  - Teenage Mutant Ninja Turtles: (1990 & 2014)
  - Teenage Mutant Ninja Turtles II: The Secret of the Ooze (1991)
  - Teenage Mutant Ninja Turtles III (1993)
  - Teenage Mutant Ninja Turtles: Out of the Shadows (2016)
  - Teenage Mutant Ninja Turtles: Mutant Mayhem (2023)
- Teenage Paparazzo (2010)
- Teenage Rebel (1956)
- Teenage Seductress (1975)
- Teenage Sex and Death at Camp Miasma (2026)
- Teenage Superstars (2017)
- Teenage Thunder (1957)
- Teenage Wasteland (2025)
- Teenage Wolfpack (1956)
- Teenage Zombies (1959)
- Teenagers (1961)
- Teenagers from Outer Space (1959)
- Teenkahon (2014)
- Teens in the Universe (1975)
- Tees Maar Khan (2010)
- Teeth (2008)

==== Teh–Tem ====
- Teheran (1946)
- Teheran 43 (1981)
- Tehilim (2007)
- Tehran (2025)
- Tehran: City of Love (2018)
- Tehzeeb: (1971 & 2003)
- Teiichi: Battle of Supreme High (2017)
- Tein Hlwar Moht Moht Lwin (1968)
- Tein Oo Lay Pyay Maung Ko Say (1977)
- Tej I Love You (2018)
- Teja (1992)
- Tejano (2018)
- Tejas (2023)
- Tekka (2024)
- Tekken: (1990 & 2009)
- Tekken 2: Kazuya's Revenge (2014)
- Tekken: Blood Vengeance (2011)
- Teko (2019)
- Tel Aviv on Fire (2018)
- Telefon (1977)
- Telegram (1971)
- Telegrame (1959)
- Television: (1931 & 2012)
- Television Event (2020)
- Television Spy (1939)
- Telikeda Bolli (2012)
- Tell: (2012 & 2014)
- Tell England (1931)
- Tell Her (2020)
- Tell It to the Bees (2018)
- Tell It to the Judge (1949)
- Tell It Like a Woman (2022)
- Tell It to the Marines: (1918 & 1926)
- Tell It to a Star (1945)
- Tell It to Sweeney (1927)
- Tell Me About Yourself (2022)
- Tell Me How I Die (2016)
- Tell Me I'm Dreaming (1998)
- Tell Me Lies (1968)
- Tell Me O Kkhuda (2011)
- Tell Me a Riddle (1980)
- Tell Me Something (1999)
- Tell Me in the Sunlight (1965)
- Tell Me Sweet Something (2015)
- Tell Me That You Love Me (1983)
- Tell Me That You Love Me, Junie Moon (1970)
- Tell Me Tonight (1932)
- Tell Me When (2021)
- Tell Me Who I Am (2019)
- Tell Me Who You Are: (1933 & 2009)
- Tell Me Why These Things Are So Beautiful (2023)
- Tell Me You Do Everything for Me (1976)
- Tell No One: (2006, 2012 & 2019)
- Tell No Tales (1939)
- Tell Them Anything You Want: A Portrait of Maurice Sendak (2009) (TV)
- Tell Them Willie Boy Is Here (1969)
- Tell the Truth (1946)
- Tell the Truth and Run: George Seldes and the American Press (1996)
- Tell Your Children (1922)
- Tell-Tale (2009)
- The Tell-Tale Heart: (1934, 1941, 1953 American, 1953 British, 1960, 1961 TV & 2014)
- The Tell-Tale Message (1912)
- The Telling (2009)
- Telling Lies in America (1997)
- Telling Secrets (1993) (TV)
- Telling Tales (2015)
- Telling Whoppers (1926)
- Telling the World (1928)
- Telling You (1998)
- Telstar: The Joe Meek Story (2008)
- Tembele (2022)
- Tembo (1951)
- Temmink: The Ultimate Fight (1998)
- Temno (1950)
- The Temp (1993)
- Temper (2015)
- Tempest: (1928, 1949, 1958, 1982 & 2015)
- The Tempest: (1908, 1911, 1960 TV, 1963, 1979 & 2010)
- Tempest in the Flesh (1954)
- Temple (2017)
- Temple Grandin (2010) (TV)
- Tempo (2003)
- Tempo! Tempo! (1929)
- Temporada de patos (2004)
- Temporal (2022)
- Temporary Family (2014)
- Temporary Marriage (1923)
- Temporary Paradise (1981)
- Temporary Release (2007)
- Temptation: (1915, 1923, 1929, 1934, 1935, 1946, 1959 & 2007)
- Temptation: Confessions of a Marriage Counselor (2013)
- Temptation Harbour (1947)
- Temptation Island: (1980 & 2011)
- Temptation of a Monk (1993)
- The Temptation of St. Tony (2009)
- Temptation in the Summer Wind (1972)
- Temptation of Wolves (2004)
- The Temptations (1998 TV)
- Tempted (2001)
- Tempting Fate: (1998 TV, 2015 & 2019)
- Tempting Heart (1999)
- The Temptress (1926)
- Temptress Moon (1996)
- Tempyō no Iraka (1980)

==== Ten–Teq ====
- The Ten (2008)
- Ten 'til Noon (2007)
- Ten Canoes (2006)
- The Ten Commandments: (1923 & 1956)
- Ten Little Indians (1965)
- Ten Minutes to Live (1932)
- Ten Minutes Older (2002)
- Ten Nights in a Bar Room: (1910 & 1921)
- Ten Nights in a Bar-Room (1931)
- Ten Nights in a Barroom (1926)
- Ten North Frederick (1958)
- Ten Seconds to Hell (1959)
- Ten Zan: The Ultimate Mission (1988)
- Tenacious D in The Pick of Destiny (2006)
- The Tenant (1976)
- Tender (2020)
- The Tender Bar (2021)
- Tender Fictions (1996)
- Tenderloin (1928)
- Tender Mercies (1983)
- Tender Is the Night (1962)
- Tenderness: (2009 & 2017)
- The Tenderness of Wolves (1973)
- Tenebrae (1982)
- Tenement (1985)
- Tenet (2020)
- Tengoku no honya (2004)
- Tennessee's Partner (1955)
- Tenshi ni I'm Fine (2016)
- Tension (1950)
- Tentacles (1977)
- Tenure (2009)
- Tenzing (2026)
- Teorema (1968)
- Tepee for Two (1963)
- Tequila Sunrise (1988)

==== Ter ====
- Tera Intezaar (2017)
- Tera Jadoo Chal Gayaa (2000)
- Tera Kya Hoga Johnny (2008)
- Tera Mera Ki Rishta (2009)
- Tera Mera Saath Rahen (2001)
- Tera Mera Tedha Medha (2015)
- Tera Mera Vaada (2012)
- Tera Naam Mera Naam (1988)
- Teraa Surroor (2016)
- Tere Pyar Mein (2000)
- Tere Bin Laden (2010)
- Tere Bin Laden: Dead or Alive (2016)
- Tere Bina Jiya Nahin Jaye (unreleased)
- Tere Ghar Ke Samne (1963)
- Tere Jism Se Jaan Tak (2015)
- Tere Mere Phere (2011)
- Tere Mere Sapne: (1971 & 1996)
- Tere Naal Love Ho Gaya (2012)
- Tere Naam (2003)
- Tere Pyar Mein: (1979 & 2000)
- Teree Sang (2009)
- Teresa: (1951, 1987 & 2010)
- Teresa the Thief (1973)
- Teresa's Tattoo (1994)
- Teri Baahon Mein (1984)
- Teri Bhabhi Hai Pagle (2018)
- Teri Kasam (1982)
- Teri Meherbaniyan (1985)
- Teri Meri Ik Jindri (1975)
- Teri Meri Kahaani (2012)
- Teri Meri Love Story (2016)
- Teri Payal Mere Geet (1993)
- Term Life (2016)
- Terminal (2018)
- The Terminal (2004)
- Terminal Bar (2003)
- Terminal Bliss (1992)
- Terminal Entry (1987)
- Terminal Error (2002)
- Terminal Exposure (1987)
- Terminal Invasion (2002)
- Terminal Island (1973)
- Terminal Station (1953)
- Terminal Velocity (1994)
- Terminal Virus (1995)
- Terminal Voyage (1994)
- Terminator series:
  - The Terminator (1984)
  - Terminator 2: Judgment Day (1991)
  - Terminator 3: Rise of the Machines (2003)
  - Terminator Salvation (2009)
  - Terminator Genisys (2015)
  - Terminator: Dark Fate (2019)
- Termini Station (1989)
- Terms of Endearment (1983)
- La Terra Trema (1957)
- A Terra-Cotta Warrior (1990)
- Terrace House: Closing Door (2015)
- Terrestrial (2026)
- A Terrible Beauty (1960)
- A Terrible Night (1896)
- Terrified (2017)
- Terrifier series:
  - Terrifier (2016)
  - Terrifier 2 (2022)
  - Terrifier 3 (2024)
- Territory of Love (2018)
- The Terror: (1917, 1920, 1926, 1928, 1938 & 1963)
- Terror in the Aisles (1984)
- Terror in the Crypt (1964)
- Terror Firmer (1999)
- Terror of Mechagodzilla (1975)
- Terror by Night (1946)
- Terror at Tenkiller (1986)
- Terror Tract (2000)
- Terror Train (1980)
- The Terror Within (1989)
- The Terror Within II (1991)
- The Terror with Women (1956)
- Terrorama! (2001)
- The Terrorist (1998)
- Terrorists, Killers and Middle-East Wackos (2005)
- TerrorVision (1986)
- Tersanjung the Movie (2021)

==== Tes–Tez ====
- Tes Cheveux Noirs Ihsan (2005)
- Teshan (2016)
- Tesla (2020)
- Tess: (1979 & 2016)
- Tess of the d'Urbervilles: (1913 & 1924)
- Tess of the Storm Country: (1914, 1922, 1932 & 1960)
- The Tesseract (2003)
- Tessie (1925)
- Test: (2013, 2014 & 2025)
- Test Pack (2012)
- Test Pattern (2019)
- Test Pilot (1938)
- Test Pilot Donald (1951)
- Test Tube Babies (1948)
- Testament: (1983, 2004 & 2023)
- The Testament of Dr. Mabuse (1933)
- Testament of Orpheus (1959)
- Testament of Youth (2014)
- Testimony: (1920 & 1987)
- The Testimony: (1946 & 2015)
- Testimony of Ana (2021)
- Testosterone: (2003, 2004 & 2007)
- Tests for Real Men (1998)
- Teta (2016)
- Tetris (2023)
- Tetsujin 28: The Movie (2005)
- Tetsujin Nijūhachi-gō: Hakuchū no Zangetsu (2007)
- Tetsuo series:
  - Tetsuo: The Iron Man (1988)
  - Tetsuo II: Body Hammer (1992)
  - Tetsuo: The Bullet Man (2009)
- Teufel im Fleisch (1964)
- Tevar (2015)
- Tevya (1939)
- Tevye and His Seven Daughters (1968)
- Tex (1982)
- Tex and the Lord of the Deep (1985)
- Tex Rides with the Boy Scouts (1937)
- Tex Takes a Holiday (1932)
- Texans Never Cry (1951)
- Texas: (1941 & 2005)
- Texas Across the River (1966)
- Texas, Adios (1966)
- Texas Bad Man (1953)
- Texas to Bataan (1942)
- Texas, Brooklyn & Heaven (1948)
- Texas Buddies (1932)
- Texas Carnival (1951)
- The Texas Chainsaw Massacre series:
  - The Texas Chain Saw Massacre (1974)
  - The Texas Chainsaw Massacre 2 (1986)
  - Leatherface: The Texas Chainsaw Massacre III (1990)
  - Texas Chainsaw Massacre: The Next Generation (1995)
  - The Texas Chainsaw Massacre (2003)
  - The Texas Chainsaw Massacre: The Beginning (2006)
  - Texas Chainsaw 3D (2013)
  - Leatherface (2017)
  - Texas Chainsaw Massacre (2022)
- Texas City (1952)
- Texas Cyclone (1932)
- Texas Dynamo (1950)
- Texas Gun Fighter (1932)
- Texas Jack (1935)
- Texas Killing Fields (2011)
- Texas Lady (1955)
- Texas Lawmen (1951)
- Texas Lightning (1981)
- Texas Manhunt (1949)
- Texas Masquerade (1944)
- Texas Panhandle (1945)
- Texas Pioneers (1932)
- Texas Ranger (1964)
- Texas Rangers (2001)
- The Texas Rangers (1936)
- Texas Rangers Ride Again (1940)
- Texas Renegades (1940)
- Texas Terror (1935)
- Texas Terrors (1940)
- Texas Tommy (1928)
- Texas Trail (1937)
- Texasville (1990)
- Text (2019)
- Textiles (2004)
- Teyzem (1986)
- Teza (2008)
- Tezaab (1988)
- Tezz (2012)

=== Th ===
==== Tha ====
- Tha (2010)
- Thaai (1974)
- Thaai Magalukku Kattiya Thaali (1959)
- Thaai Manasu (1994)
- Thaai Mookaambikai (1982)
- Thaai Naadu (1989)
- Thaai Nadu (1947)
- Thaai Sollai Thattadhe (1961)
- Thaaiku Oru Thaalaattu (1986)
- Thaala (2019)
- Thaalam Manasinte Thaalam (1981)
- Thaalam Thettiya Tharattu (1983)
- Thaalappoli (1977)
- Thaali (1997)
- Thaali Bhagyam (1966)
- Thaali Kattiya Raasa (1992)
- Thaali Pudhusu (1997)
- Thaalikaatha Kaaliamman (2001)
- Thaamarathoni (1975)
- Thaamirabharani (2007)
- Thaanaa Serndha Koottam (2018)
- Thaandavam (2012)
- Thaaraavu (1981)
- Thaaye Unakkaga (1966)
- Thaayi Saheba (1997)
- Thaayillamal Naan Illai (1979)
- Thaayin Madiyil (1964)
- Thale (2012)
- Thampu (1978)
- Thank God It's Friday (1978)
- Thank You for Smoking (2006)
- Thank You for Your Service: (2015 & 2017)
- Thank Your Lucky Stars (1943)
- Thanks for the Memory (1938)
- Thanks for Sharing (2012)
- Thanksgiving (2023)
- ThanksKilling (2008)
- Thar (2022)
- Thara (1970)
- Thark (1932)
- That Brennan Girl (1946)
- That Certain Woman (1937)
- That Cold Day in the Park (1969)
- That Darn Cat: (1965 & 1997)
- That Evening Sun (2009)
- That Girl in Yellow Boots (2010)
- That Hamilton Woman (1941)
- That Man Bolt (1973)
- That Man from Rio (1964)
- That Midnight Kiss (1949)
- That Most Important Thing: Love (1975)
- That Night in Varennes (1982)
- That Obscure Object of Desire (1977)
- That Old Feeling (1997)
- That Thing You Do! (1996)
- That Touch of Mink (1962)
- That Uncertain Feeling (1941)
- That's Carry On! (1977)
- That's Entertainment! series:
  - That's Entertainment! (1974)
  - That's Entertainment, Part II (1976)
  - That's Dancing! (1985)
  - That's Entertainment! III (1994)
- That's Life! (1986)
- That's My Boy: (1932, 1951 & 2012)
- That's My Gal (1947)
- That's My Wife: (1929 & 1933)
- The Thaw (2010)
- Thayagam (1996)
- Thayai Katha Thanayan (1962)
- Thayamma (1991)
- Thaye Neeye Thunai (1987)
- Thayi Devaru (1971)
- Thayi Illada Thabbali (2003)
- Thayi Karulu (1962)
- Thazhampoo (1965)
- Thazhuvatha Kaigal (1986)
- Thazhvaram (1990)

==== The ====
- The Theatre Bizarre (2011)
- Theatre of Blood (1973)
- Thee: (1981 & 2009)
- Theeb (2014)
- Theekkadal (1980)
- Their Own Desire (1930)
- Their Purple Moment (1928)
- Theirs is the Glory (1946)
- Thelma (2024)
- Thelma & Louise (1991)
- Thelma the Unicorn (2024)
- Them (2006)
- Them Thar Hills (1934)
- Them! (1954)
- Themroc (1942)
- Then Came You (2018)
- Then She Found Me (2008)
- Theodora Goes Wild (1936)
- Theodore Case Sound Test: Gus Visser and His Singing Duck (1925)
- Theodore Rex (1995)
- Theorem (1968)
- The Theory of Everything: (2006 TV & 2014)
- The Theory of Flight (1998)
- There Are No Saints (2022)
- There Be Dragons (2011)
- There Is No Evil (2020)
- There is a Secret in my Soup (2001)
- There Was a Crooked Man (1960)
- There Was a Crooked Man... (1970)
- There Was a Father (1942)
- There Will Be Blood (2007)
- There Will Be No Leave Today (1959)
- There's Always Vanilla (1971)
- There's a Girl in My Soup (1970)
- There's No Business Like Show Business (1954)
- There's No Place Like This Place, Anyplace (2020)
- There's Someone Inside Your House (2021)
- There's Something About Mary (1998)
- There's Something About a Soldier: (1934 & 1943)
- There's Something About Susan (2013 TV)
- There's Something in the Water (2019)
- There's Something Wrong with Aunt Diane (2011 TV)
- There's Something Wrong with the Children (2023)
- Theremin: An Electronic Odyssey (1993)
- Theresienstadt (1944)
- These Are the Damned (1963)
- These Thousand Hills (1959)
- These Three (1936)
- Thesis (1996)
- Thesis on a Homicide (2013)
- They: (1993 TV, 2002 & 2017)
- They/Them (2022)
- They All Come Out (1939)
- They All Laughed (1981)
- They Call Me Bruce? (1982)
- They Call Me Mister Tibbs! (1970)
- They Call Me Trinity (1970)
- They Came Back (2004)
- They Came to Cordura (1959)
- They Came to Rob Las Vegas (1968)
- They Came Together (2014)
- They Cloned Tyrone (2023)
- They Died with Their Boots On (1941)
- They Don't Wear Black Tie (1981)
- They Drive by Night (1940)
- They Follow (TBA)
- They Go Boom (1929)
- They Knew What They Wanted (1940)
- They Live (1988)
- They Live by Night (1949)
- They Look Like People (2015)
- They Might Be Giants (1971)
- They Saved Hitler's Brain (1968)
- They Shall Not Grow Old (2018)
- They Shoot Horses, Don't They? (1969)
- They Still Call Me Bruce (1987)
- They Went That-A-Way & That-A-Way (1978)
- They Were Expendable (1945)
- They Will Kill You (2026)
- They're Outside (2020)
- They're a Weird Mob (1966)

==== Thi ====
- Thick as Thieves (2009)
- Thicker than Water: (1935, 1999, 2000, 2005 & 2006)
- Thief (1981)
- The Thief (1952 & 1997)
- The Thief of Baghdad: (1924, 1940 & 1961)
- A Thief Catcher (1914)
- The Thief and the Cobbler (1993)
- The Thief Lord (2006)
- The Thief Who Came to Dinner (1973)
- Thieves Like Us (1974)
- Thieves' Highway (1949)
- The Thin Blue Line (1988)
- Thin Ice: (1919, 1937, 2011 & 2013)
- A Thin Line Between Love and Hate (1996)
- The Thin Man (1934)
- The Thin Man Goes Home (1945)
- The Thin Red Line: (1964 & 1998)
- The Thing: (1982 & 2011)
- The Thing About My Folks (2005)
- The Thing from Another World (1951)
- The Thing That Couldn't Die (1958)
- The Thing with Two Heads (1972)
- Things (1989)
- Things Are Tough All Over (1982)
- Things Behind the Sun (2001)
- Things Change (1988)
- Things to Come (1936)
- Things to Do in Denver When You're Dead (1995)
- Things Heard & Seen (2021)
- Things We Lost in the Fire (2007)
- Things You Can Tell Just by Looking at Her (2000)
- Think like a Man (2012)
- Thinner (1996)
- The Thinning (2016)
- The Thinning: New World Order (2018)
- The Third Generation: (1979 & 2009)
- The Third Lover (1962)
- The Third Man (1949)
- The Third Miracle (2000)
- The Third Part of the Night (1971)
- The Third Party (2016)
- The Third Secret (1964)
- The Third Wheel (2002)
- The Third Wife (2018)
- Thirst (2009)
- Thirteen (2003)
- The Thirteen Chairs (1969)
- Thirteen Conversations About One Thing (2001)
- Thirteen Days (2000)
- Thirteen Ghosts: (1960 & 2001)
- Thirteen Lives (2022)
- Thirteen Princess Trees (2006)
- Thirteen Women (1932)
- The Thirteenth Floor (1999)
- The Thirteenth Hour: (1927 & 1947)
- The Thirteenth Warrior (1999)
- The Thirteenth Year (1999) (TV)
- The Thirty Nine Steps (1978)
- Thirty Seconds Over Tokyo (1944)
- Thirty Two Short Films About Glenn Gould (1993)
- This Angry Age (1957)
- This Is 40 (2012)
- This Is the Army (1943)
- This Boy's Life (1993)
- This Closeness (2023)
- This Christmas (2007)
- This Is Cinerama (1952)
- This Is the End (2013)
- This Is England (2006)
- This Film Is Not Yet Rated (2006)
- This Girl's Life (2003)
- This Gun for Hire (1942)
- This Is Happening (2015)
- This Happy Breed (1944)
- This Happy Feeling (1959)
- This Island Earth (1955)
- This Land Is Mine (1943)
- This Man Must Die (1969)
- This Is Martin Bonner (2013)
- This Is Me (2015)
- This Means War (2012)
- This Must Be the Place (2011)
- This Is My Father (1999)
- This Is the Night: (1932 & 2021)
- This Is Not a Film (2011)
- This Is Not a Love Song (2003)
- This Is Not a Test: (1962, 2008 & 2026)
- This Property Is Condemned (1966)
- This Is Spinal Tap (1984)
- This Sporting Life (1963)
- This Is Where I Leave You (2014)
- Thisai Maariya Paravaigal (1979)
- Thistledown (1938)
- Thithi (2015)
- Thithikudhe (2003)
- Thittakudi (2010)
- Thittam Irandu (2021)
- Thittam Poattu Thirudura Kootam (2019)
- Thiya Loaibaa Dhurah (2018)
- Thiyagi (1947)
- Thiyagu (1990)

==== Tho ====
- Thoda Lutf Thoda Ishq (2015)
- Thoda Pyaar Thoda Magic (2008)
- Thoda Tum Badlo Thoda Hum (2004)
- Thodakkam (2008)
- Thodallullu (1988)
- Thodari (2016)
- Thodarum (1999)
- Thodasa Roomani Ho Jayen (1990)
- Thodi Kodallu (1957)
- Thodi Life Thoda Magic (2008)
- Thodi Thodi Si Manmaaniyan (2017)
- Thodisi Bewafaii (1980)
- Thodraa (2018)
- Thodu Dangalu (1954)
- Thodu Needa (1965)
- Thoicha (2010)
- Thokkukal Kadha Parayunnu (1968)
- Tholaipesi (2007)
- Tholi Kodi Koosindi (1981)
- Tholi Muddhu (1993)
- Tholi Prema: (1998 & 2018)
- Tholi Valapu (2001)
- Tholireyi Gadichindi (1977)
- Tholkan Enikku Manassilla (1977)
- Tholu Bommalata (2019)
- The Thomas Crown Affair: (1968 & 1999)
- Thomas & Friends: Misty Island Rescue (2010)
- Thomas Jefferson (1997)
- Thomas and the Magic Railroad (2000)
- Thondan: (1995 & 2017)
- Thondimuthalum Driksakshiyum (2017)
- Thong Dee Fun Khao (2017)
- Thoogudeepa (1966)
- Thookku Thookki (1954)
- Thooku Medai (1982)
- Thoondil (2008)
- Thoonga Nagaram (2011)
- Thoongaa Vanam (2015)
- Thoongathey Thambi Thoongathey (1983)
- Thooral Ninnu Pochchu (1982)
- Thoorpu Padamara (1976)
- Thoothukudi (2006)
- Thooval Kottaram (1996)
- Thoovalkattu (2010)
- Thoovalsparsham (1990)
- Thoovanam (2007)
- Thoovanathumbikal (1987)
- Thoppil Joppan (2016)
- Thor movies:
  - Thor (2011)
  - Thor: Tales of Asgard (2011)
  - Thor: The Dark World (2013)
  - Thor: Ragnarok (2017)
  - Thor: Love and Thunder (2022)
- Thor and the Amazon Women (1963)
- Thor the Conqueror (1983)
- Thora Jee Le (2017)
- Thoranai (2009)
- Thoranam (1987)
- The Thorn (1974)
- Thoroughbred (1936)
- The Thoroughbred: (1916 & 1928)
- Thoroughbreds: (1944 & 2017)
- Thoroughbreds Don't Cry (1937)
- Thoroughly Modern Millie (1967)
- Those Awful Hats (1909)
- Those Blasted Kids (1947)
- Those Boys! (1909)
- Those Calloways (1965)
- Those Country Kids (1914)
- Those Dear Departed (1987)
- Those Dirty Dogs (1973)
- Those Endearing Young Charms (1945)
- Those Glory Glory Days (1983 TV)
- Those Happy Days: (1914 & 2006)
- Those Happy Years (2013)
- Those High Grey Walls (1939)
- Those Kids from Town (1942)
- Those Lips, Those Eyes (1980)
- Those Love Pangs (1914)
- Those Magnificent Men in their Flying Machines (1965)
- Those Merry Souls (1985)
- Those Old Love Letters (1992)
- Those People (2015)
- Those People Next Door (1953)
- Those Redheads from Seattle (1953)
- Those Were the Days: (1996, 1997, & 2000)
- Those Were Wonderful Days (1934)
- Thou Shalt Honor Thy Wife (1925)
- Thou Wast Mild and Lovely (2014)
- Those She Left Behind (1989 TV)
- Those Terrible Twins (1925)
- Those Three French Girls (1930)
- Those Two (1935)
- Those We Love (1932)
- Those Were Wonderful Days (1934)
- Those Who Dance: (1924 & 1930)
- Those Who Dare (1924)
- Those Who Judge (1924)
- Those Who Love: (1926 & 1929)
- Those Who Love Me Can Take the Train (1998)
- Those Who Remain (2007)
- Those Who Remained (2019)
- Those Who Walk Away (2022)
- Those Who Wish Me Dead (2021)
- Thoughtcrimes (2003)
- A Thousand Acres (1997)
- A Thousand Billion Dollars (1982)
- A Thousand Clouds of Peace (2003)
- A Thousand Clowns (1965)
- The Thousand Eyes of Dr. Mabuse (1960)
- A Thousand Words (2012)
- Thousands Cheer (1943)

==== Thr ====
- Threads: (1984 TV & 2017)
- Three: (1965, 1969, 2002, 2006, 2008, 2010 & 2016)
- Three Ages (1923)
- Three Amigos (1986)
- Three Billboards Outside Ebbing, Missouri (2017)
- Three Blind Mice: (1938, 2003 & 2008)
- Three Body (2016)
- The Three Burials of Melquiades Estrada (2005)
- Three Businessmen (1998)
- The Three Caballeros (1944)
- Three Christs (2017)
- Three Coins in the Fountain (1954)
- Three Colors series:
  - Three Colors: Blue (1993)
  - Three Colors: White (1994)
  - Three Colors: Red (1994)
- Three Comrades: (1935 & 1938)
- Three on a Couch (1966)
- Three Crowns of the Sailor (1983)
- Three Daughters (1961)
- Three Days in August (2016)
- Three Days of the Condor (1975)
- Three Dollars (2005)
- Three Faces East: (1926 & 1930)
- The Three Faces of Eve (1957)
- Three Fugitives (1989)
- Three Godfathers (1936)
- The Three Godfathers (1916)
- Three the Hard Way (1974)
- Three Identical Strangers (2018)
- Three Kings: (1999 & 2011)
- Three Little Pigs (1933)
- Three Little Words (1950)
- The Three Lives of Thomasina (1963)
- The Three Marias (2002)
- Three on a Match (1932)
- Three Men and a Baby (1987)
- Three Men in a Boat: (1920, 1933, 1956, 1961, 1975 TV & 1979)
- Three Men on a Horse (1936)
- Three Men to Kill (1980)
- Three Men and a Little Lady (1990)
- Three Men in the Snow: (1936, 1955 & 1974)
- The Three Million Trial (1926)
- Three Modern Women (1932)
- Three Monkeys (2008)
- Three Mothers (2006)
- The Three Musketeers: (1921, 1933 serial, 1973, 1992, 1993, 2011 & 2013)
- The Three Musketeers: D'Artagnan (2023)
- The Three Musketeers: Milady (2023)
- Three O'Clock High (1987)
- Three Outlaw Samurai (1964)
- Three from Prostokvashino (1978)
- Three Reservists (1971)
- Three for the Road (1987)
- Three Seasons (1999)
- Three Sisters: (1970, 1994 & 2012)
- The Three Sisters: (1930, 1966 & 1970 TV)
- Three Smart Girls (1936)
- The Three Smiles (1969)
- Three Songs About Lenin (1934)
- Three Steps to the Gallows (1953)
- The Three Stooges series:
  - The Three Stooges Meet Hercules (1962)
  - The Three Stooges in Orbit (1962)
  - The Three Stooges Go Around the World in a Daze (1963)
  - The Three Stooges (2000)
  - The Three Stooges (2012)
- Three Stories of Love (2015)
- Three to Tango (1999)
- Three Thousand Years of Longing (2022)
- Three Times (2005)
- Three Tough Guys (1974)
- Three Wise Fools: (1923 & 1946)
- Three Wise Men: (2008 & 2016)
- Three Wishes for Cinderella (1973)
- Three Women: (1924, 1949 & 1952)
- Three Young Texans (1954)
- Three... Extremes (2004)
- The Threepenny Opera (1931)
- Threesome: (1994 & 2017)
- The Threesome (2025)
- The Thrill of It All (1963)
- The Thrill Killers (1964)
- Thrill of a Lifetime (1937)
- Thrill Ride (2017)
- Thriller – A Cruel Picture (1973)
- Throne of Blood (1957)
- Throne of Elves (2016)
- Through Black Spruce (2018)
- Through the Fire: (1982, 2005 & 2018)
- Through a Glass Darkly (1961)
- Through the Looking Glass (1976)
- Through the Night (2020)
- Through the Olive Trees (1994)
- Throw Down (2004)
- Throw Momma from the Train (1987)
- Throwback (2014)
- Thru the Mirror (1936)

==== Thu–Thy ====
- Thudakkam (2004)
- Thudar Katha (1991)
- Thudikkum Karangal (1983)
- Thug Life (2001)
- Thugs with Dirty Mugs (1939)
- Thugs of Hindostan (2018)
- Thukkaram (1938)
- Thulabharam (1968)
- Thulasi: (1976 & 1987)
- Thulasi Jalandar (1947)
- Thulasi Maadam (1963)
- Thulavarsham (1976)
- Thuli Visham (1954)
- Thullatha Manamum Thullum (1999)
- Thullal (2007)
- Thulli Thirintha Kaalam (1998)
- Thulli Vilayadu (2013)
- Thullura Vayasu (2006)
- Thulluvadho Ilamai (2002)
- Thumb Fun (1952)
- Thumb Tripping (1972)
- Thumbaa (2019)
- Thumbelina (1994)
- Thumbida Koda (1964)
- Thumbida Mane (1995)
- Thumbolarcha (1974)
- Thumboli Kadappuram (1995)
- Thumbs Down (1927)
- Thumbs Up (1943)
- Thumbsucker (2005)
- Thumper (2017)
- Thun Man Handiya (1970)
- Thunai (1982)
- Thunai Mudhalvar (2015)
- Thunaivan (1969)
- Thundenek (2018)
- Thunder (1929)
- Thunder Afloat (1939)
- Thunder Alley: (1967 & 1985)
- Thunder Among the Leaves (1958)
- Thunder of Battle (1964)
- Thunder Bay (1953)
- Thunder Below (1932)
- Thunder Birds (1942)
- Thunder in Carolina (1960)
- Thunder in the City (1937)
- Thunder in the Desert (1938)
- Thunder in the East: (1950 & 1951)
- Thunder Force (2021)
- Thunder in God's Country (1951)
- Thunder in Guyana (2003)
- Thunder on the Hill (1951)
- Thunder Island (1963)
- Thunder and Lightning: (1938 & 1977)
- Thunder, Lightning and Sunshine (1936)
- Thunder Mountain: (1925, 1935 & 1947)
- Thunder in the Night (1935)
- Thunder Over Arizona (1956)
- Thunder Over Paris (1940)
- Thunder Over the Plains (1953)
- Thunder Over the Prairie (1941)
- Thunder Over Texas (1934)
- Thunder Pass (1954)
- Thunder in the Pines (1948)
- Thunder Riders (1928)
- Thunder River Feud (1942)
- Thunder Road: (1958, 2016 & 2018)
- Thunder Rock (1942)
- Thunder Run (1986)
- Thunder in the Sun (1959)
- Thunder Town (1946)
- Thunder Trail (1937)
- Thunder in the Valley (1947)
- Thunder Warrior (1983)
- Thunder Warrior II (1987)
- Thunder Warrior III (1988)
- Thunderball (1965)
- Thunderbird 6 (1968)
- Thunderbirds: (1952 & 2004)
- Thunderbirds Are Go (1966)
- Thunderbolt: (1910, 1929, 1947 & 1995)
- The Thunderbolt (1912)
- Thunderbolt Jack (1920)
- Thunderbolt and Lightfoot (1974)
- Thunderbolt's Tracks (1927)
- Thunderbolts of Fate (1919)
- Thunderbolts* (2025)
- Thundercrack! (1975)
- Thundergate (1923)
- Thundergod (1928)
- Thunderground (1989)
- Thunderhead, Son of Flicka (1945)
- Thunderheart (1992)
- Thunderhoof (1948)
- The Thundermans Return (2024)
- Thundering Caravans (1952)
- Thundering Dawn (1923)
- Thundering Fleas (1926)
- Thundering Frontier (1940)
- Thundering Gun Slingers (1944)
- Thundering Hoofs: (1924 & 1942)
- Thundering Jets (1958)
- Thundering Mountains (1963)
- Thundering Thompson (1929)
- Thundering Trails (1943)
- Thunderpants (2002)
- Thunderstorm (1956)
- Thunderstruck: (2004 & 2012)
- Thunichal (2010)
- Thunive Thunai (1976)
- Thuntata (2002)
- Thunveni Yamaya (1983)
- Thuppakki (2012)
- Thuppakki Munai (2018)
- Thursday (1998)
- Thwar Lu Soe Dar Myo Taw Tat Tal (2012)
- THX 1138 (1971)
- Thy Kingdom Come (2018)
- Thy Name Is Woman (1924)
- Thy Neighbor's Wife: (1953 & 2001)
- Thy Will Be Done (2015)
- Thy Womb (2012)
- Thyaga Bhoomi (1939)
- Thyagam (1978)
- Thyagi (1982)

=== Ti ===
- Ti ho cercata in tutti i necrologi (2013)
- Ti Oluwa Ni Ile (1993)
- Ti presento un amico (2010)
- Ti Saddhya Kay Karte (2017)

==== Tib–Til ====
- Tibet in Song (2009)
- Tibi and His Mothers (2013)
- Tic Tac (1997)
- tick, tick... Boom! (2021)
- ...tick...tick...tick... (1970)
- Tick Tock (2018)
- Tick Tock Lullaby (2007)
- Tick Tock Tuckered (1944)
- Ticked-Off Trannies with Knives (2010)
- Ticker (2001)
- Ticket to Heaven (1981)
- Ticket to Paradise: (1936, 1961, 1962, 2011 & 2022)
- A Ticket to Tomahawk (1950)
- Tickle Me (1965)
- Ticks (1994)
- Tideland (2005)
- Tie Me Up! Tie Me Down! (1990)
- Tiempos de dictadura (2012)
- The Tied Up Balloon (1967)
- Tieta do Agreste (1996)
- Tiger: (1979, 2007, 2015, 2017, 2018 & 2024)
- The Tiger (1978)
- Tiger Bay: (1934 & 1959)
- Tiger on Beat (1988)
- The Tiger Brigades (2006)
- Tiger Cage (1988)
- Tiger Cage 2 (1990)
- Tiger Cage 3 (1991)
- Tiger Cruise (2004) (TV)
- The Tiger of Eschnapur: (1938 & 1959)
- Tiger Eyes (2013)
- The Tiger Hunter (2016)
- The Tiger Murder Case (1930)
- Tiger in the Smoke (1956)
- The Tiger and the Snow (2005)
- A Tiger Walks (1964)
- The Tiger: An Old Hunter's Tale (2015)
- Tigerland (2000)
- Tigers: (2014 & 2020)
- The Tigers (1991)
- Tigers Are Not Afraid (2017)
- Tigertail (2020)
- The Tigger Movie (2000)
- Tightrope (1984)
- Tik Tok (2016)
- Til Death (2007)
- 'Til There Was You (1997)
- Tilaï (1990)
- Till (2022)
- Till the Clouds Roll By (1946)
- Till Death (2021)
- Till Human Voices Wake Us (2002)
- Till There Was You: (1990 & 2003)
- Tillamook Treasure (2006)
- Tillie's Punctured Romance (1914)
- Tilt (1979)
- Tilt (2011)

==== Tim ====
- Tim (1979)
- Tim and Eric's Billion Dollar Movie (2012)
- Tim Tyler's Luck (1937)
- Tim's Vermeer (2013)
- Timber Falls (2008)
- Timbuktu: (1959 & 2014)
- Time: (1999, 2006, 2007 & 2020)
- Time After Time (1979)
- Time Bandits (1981)
- A Time for Burning (1966)
- Time Changer (2002)
- Time Cut (2024)
- A Time for Drunken Horses (2000)
- A Time for Dying (1969)
- Time of Favor (2000)
- Time Flies: (1944 & 2013)
- Time of the Gypsies (1988)
- Time to Hunt (2020)
- A Time to Kill: (1955 & 1996)
- Time to Leave (2006)
- Time Limit (1957)
- Time to Love: (1927 & 1965)
- A Time to Love and a Time to Die (1958)
- The Time Machine: (1960, 1978 TV & 2002)
- A Time for Miracles (1980) (TV)
- Time Out: (1984, 1998, 2001 & 2015)
- Time Out of Mind: (1947 & 2014)
- Time Raiders (2016)
- Time Regained (1999)
- Time Stands Still (1982)
- The Time of Their Lives (1946)
- The Time Traveler's Wife (2009)
- Time Travelers (1976)
- The Time Travelers (1964)
- Time of the Wolf: (2002 & 2003)
- Timecode (2000)
- Timecop (1994)
- Timecop 2: The Berlin Decision (2003)
- Timecrimes (2008)
- Timelapse of the Future (2019)
- Timelapse of the Entire Universe (2018)
- Timeline (2003)
- Timequest (2002)
- TiMER (2009)
- Timerider: The Adventure of Lyle Swann (1982)
- The Times of Harvey Milk (1984)
- Times of Joy and Sorrow (1957)
- Times Square: (1929 & 1980)
- Timeslip (1955)
- Timing (2014)
- Timmy Failure: Mistakes Were Made (2020)

==== Tin–Tiz ====
- Tin Can (2020)
- Tin Can Man (2007)
- Tin Cup (1996)
- The Tin Drum (1979)
- Tin Gods (1926)
- Tin Gods (1932)
- Tin Hats (1926)
- Tin Man (1983)
- The Tin Man (1935)
- Tin Men (1987)
- The Tin Mine (2005)
- Tin Pan Alley (1940)
- Tin Pan Alley Cats (1943)
- Tin Soldier (2025)
- The Tin Star (1957)
- Tin String (2019)
- Tin Toy (1988)
- Tina (2021)
- The Tinder Box (1959)
- The Tinder Swindler (2022)
- Tine (1964)
- Tingel-Tangel (1927)
- Tingel-Tangel (1930)
- Tingeltangel (1922)
- The Tingler (1959)
- Tini: The Movie (2016)
- Tinker Bell (2008)
- Tinker Tailor Soldier Spy (2011)
- Tinker Ticker (2013)
- Tins (2007)
- Tinsel (1918)
- Tinta roja (1918)
- Tintin series:
  - Tintin and I (2003)
  - Tintin and the Blue Oranges (1964)
  - Tintin and the Golden Fleece (1961)
  - Tintin and the Lake of Sharks (1972)
  - Tintin and the Temple of the Sun (1969)
- Tintomara (1970)
- Tintorettor Jishu (2008)
- Tiny Furniture (2010)
- Tiny Times series:
  - Tiny Times (2013)
  - Tiny Times 2 (2013)
  - Tiny Times 3 (2014)
  - Tiny Times 4 (2015)
- Tiny Toon Adventures: How I Spent My Vacation (1992)
- Tiong Bahru Social Club (2020)
- Tiovivo c. 1950 (2004)
- Tip on a Dead Jockey (1957)
- Tip-Off Girls (1938)
- Tiptoes (2003)
- Tirad Pass: The Last Stand of Gen. Gregorio del Pilar (1996)
- Tiragabadda Telugubidda (1988)
- Tiramisu (2002)
- Tiramisu (2008)
- Tirana Year Zero (2002)
- Tirant lo Blanc (2006)
- Tire Trouble (1924)
- Tired of Kissing Frogs (2006)
- Tired Theodore (1957)
- Tish (1942)
- Tit for Tat (1904)
- Tit for Tat (1921)
- Tit for Tat (1935)
- Titan A.E. (2000)
- Titane (2021)
- Titanic 666 (2022)
- Titanic (1915)
- Titanic (1943)
- Titanic (1953)
- Titanic (1997)
- Titanic II (2010)
- Titanic Love (2012)
- Titanic: The Legend Goes On (2000)
- Titanic Town (1998)
- Titanic Waltz (1964)
- Titanoboa: Monster Snake (2012)
- Titans of the Deep (1938)
- Titãs – A Vida Até Parece Uma Festa (2008)
- Titash Ekti Nadir Naam (1973)
- Titeuf (2011)
- The Titfield Thunderbolt (1952)
- Titicut Follies (1967)
- Title to Murder (2001)
- Title Shot (1979)
- Titli (2002)
- Titli (2014)
- Tito (2004)
- Tito (2019)
- Tito and the Birds (2018)
- Tito and Me (1992)
- Titus (1999)
- Tiwa's Baggage (2017)
- Tiyaan (2017)
- Tiyanak (1988)
- Tiyasha (2013)
- Tizoc (1957)

=== Tj–Tm ===
- Tjenare kungen (2005)
- Tjiraa (2012)
- Tjitji: The Himba Girl (2015)
- Tjitra (1949)
- Tjoet Nja' Dhien (1988)
- T.K.O. (2007)
- Tlatelolco, verano del 68 (2013)
- TMNT (2007)

=== To ===
- To (1964)
- To Age or Not to Age (2010)
- To All the Boys series:
  - To All the Boys I've Loved Before (2018)
  - To All the Boys: P.S. I Still Love You (2020)
  - To All the Boys: Always and Forever (2021)
- To All a Goodnight (1980)
- To All My Friends on Shore (1972 TV)
- To Award (Posthumously) (1986)
- To B or Not to B (unreleased)
- To Be (1990)
- To Be Alive! (1964)
- To Be Called For (1914)
- To Be Continued (2018)
- To Be Continued (2023)
- To Be Fat like Me (2007 TV)
- To Be and to Have (2002)
- To Be a Lady (1934)
- To Be a Millionaire (1980)
- To Be or Not to Be: (1942 & 1983)
- To Be Number One (1991)
- To Be Sixteen (1979)
- To Be Someone (2021)
- To Be Takei (2014)
- To Be Without Worries (1953)
- To Beat the Band (1935)
- To Bed or Not to Bed (1963)
- To Beep or Not to Beep (1963)
- To Better Days (2012)
- To Bina Bhala Lagena (2008)
- To Bina Mo Kahani Adha (2007)
- To the Bone (2017)
- To Brave Alaska (1996 TV)
- To Brighton with Gladys (1933)
- To Build a Fire (2016)
- To Catch a Dollar (2010)
- To Catch a Thief (1955)
- To-Day (1917)
- To the Devil a Daughter (1976)
- To Die For: (1989, 1994 & 1995)
- The To Do List (2013)
- To Each His Own (1946)
- To End All Wars (2001)
- To the Ends of the Earth: (1948 & 2019)
- To Fly! (1976)
- To Gillian on Her 37th Birthday (1996)
- To Have and Have Not (1944)
- To Have and to Hold: (1916, 1922, 1951 & 1996)
- To Have or Not to Have (2001)
- To Hell and Back (1955)
- To the Hilt (2014)
- To Joy (1950)
- To Kill a Dragon (1988)
- To Kill a King (2003)
- To Kill a Mockingbird (1962)
- To the Last Man: (1923 & 1933)
- To Leslie (2022)
- To Live: (1937, 1952, 1994 & 2010)
- To Live and Die in L.A. (1985)
- To Live in Peace (1947)
- To Make a Killing (1988)
- To Market To Market (1987)
- To Marry a Captain (1985)
- To Mary – with Love (1936)
- To Matthieu (2000)
- To Olivia (2021)
- To Paint or Make Love (2005)
- To Rome with Love (2012)
- To Save a Life (2010)
- To Shoot an Elephant (2009)
- To Sir, with Love: (1967 & 2006)
- To Sleep with Anger (1990)
- To Spring (1936)
- To the Wonder (2013)
- To Wong Foo, Thanks for Everything! Julie Newmar (1995)
- To Write Love on Her Arms (2012)

==== Toa–Tol ====
- Toad Road (2012)
- Toad Warrior (1996)
- The Toast of New Orleans (1950)
- Toba Tek Singh (2018)
- Tobacco (1962)
- Tobacco Road (1941)
- Tobi (1978)
- Tobor the Great (1954)
- Tobruk: (1967 & 2008)
- Tocar el cielo (2007)
- Toccata for Toy Trains (1957)
- Todas las azafatas van al cielo (2002)
- Today: (1930, 2012 & 2014)
- Today Is the Day (1933)
- Today and Tomorrow: (1912 & 2003)
- Today We Kill... Tomorrow We Die! (1968)
- Today We Live (1933)
- Today You Die (2005)
- Today's Special (2009)
- Todo mal (2018)
- Todo modo (1976)
- Todo un hombre (1943)
- Together: (1956, 1971, 2000, 2002, 2009, 2010, 2018, 2021 & 2025)
- ToGetHer (2009)
- Together? (1979)
- Together 99 (2023)
- Together Again (1944)
- Together Alone (1991)
- Together in the Dark (1933)
- Together We Live (1935)
- Togetherness Supreme (2010)
- Togger (1937)
- Togo (2019)
- Toh Baat Pakki! (2010)
- Toi et moi (2006)
- Toi, le venin (1958)
- Toilers of the Sea: (1923 & 1936)
- Toilet: Ek Prem Katha (2017)
- Toire no Hanako-san (1995)
- Tokay Rhapsody (1937)
- Tokei – Adieu l'hiver (1986)
- Tokhon Kuasa Chilo (2019)
- Toki o Kakeru Shōjo: (1983 & 1997)
- Toki no Tabibito: Time Stranger (1986)
- Tokiori – Dobras do Tempo (2013)
- Tokyo! (2008)
- Tokyo After Dark (1959)
- Tokyo Blackout (1987)
- Tokyo Chorus (1931)
- Tokyo Cowboy (2023)
- Tokyo Decadence (1992)
- Tokyo Drifter (1966)
- Tokyo Emmanuelle (1975)
- Tokyo Eyes (1998)
- Tokyo Family (2013)
- Tokyo Fiancée (2014)
- Tokyo File 212 (1951)
- Tokyo Fist (1995)
- Tokyo Friends: The Movie (2006)
- Tokyo Ghoul (2017)
- Tokyo Godfathers (2003)
- Tokyo Gore Police (2008)
- Tokyo Joe (1949)
- Tōkyō Mukokuseki Shōjo (2015)
- Tokyo Olympiad (1965)
- Tokyo Raiders (2000)
- Tokyo Story (1953)
- Tokyo Tower: Mom and Me, and Sometimes Dad (2007)
- The Tokyo Trial (2006)
- Tokyo Twilight (1957)
- Tokyo: The Last Megalopolis (1988)
- Tokyo: The Last War (1989)
- Tol'able David: (1921 & 1930)
- Told in the Hills (1919)
- Told at Twilight (1917)
- Tolkien (2019)
- Toll (2023)
- The Toll (2020)
- Toll Booth (2010)
- Toll of the Desert (1935)
- The Toll Gate (1920)
- The Toll of the Sea (1922)

==== Tom ====
- Tom (2002)
- Tom in America (2014)
- Tom Brown's School Days (1940)
- Tom Brown's Schooldays: (1916, 1951 & 2005 TV)
- Tom Clancy's Op Center (1995 TV)
- Tom, Dick and Hairy (1993)
- Tom, Dick and Harry (1941)
- Tom, Dick, and Harry (2006)
- Tom at the Farm (2013)
- Tom of Finland (2017)
- Tom and His Pals (1926)
- Tom Horn (1980)
- Tom & Huck (1995)
- Tom and Jerry films:
  - Tom and Jerry (2021)
  - Tom and Jerry: Back to Oz (2016)
  - Tom and Jerry: Blast Off to Mars (2005)
  - Tom and Jerry: The Fast and the Furry (2005)
  - Tom and Jerry: Forbidden Compass (2025)
  - Tom and Jerry: The Lost Dragon (2014)
  - Tom and Jerry: The Magic Ring (2002)
  - Tom and Jerry Meet Sherlock Holmes (2010)
  - Tom and Jerry: The Movie (1992)
  - Tom and Jerry: A Nutcracker Tale (2007)
  - Tom and Jerry: Robin Hood and His Merry Mouse (2012)
  - Tom and Jerry: Shiver Me Whiskers (2006)
  - Tom and Jerry: Spy Quest (2015)
  - Tom and Jerry: Willy Wonka and the Chocolate Factory (2017)
  - Tom and Jerry and the Wizard of Oz (2011)
  - Tom and Jerry's Giant Adventure (2013)
- Tom Jones (1963)
- Tom on Mars (2005)
- Tom Meets Zizou (2011)
- Tom Sawyer: (1907, 1917, 1930, 1938, 1973 & 2000)
- Tom Sawyer & Huckleberry Finn (2014)
- Tom Sawyer, Detective (1938)
- Tom & Thomas (2002)
- Tom Thumb (1958)
- Tom Thumb and Little Red Riding Hood (1962)
- Tom Tom Tomcat (1953)
- Tom, Tom, the Piper's Son (1969)
- Tom Toms of Mayumba (1955)
- Tom Turk and Daffy (1944)
- Tom & Viv (1994)
- Tom White (2004)
- Tom-Yum-Goong (2005)
- Tom Yum Goong 2 (2013)
- Tom's Gang (1927)
- Tom's Little Star (1919)
- Tom's Midnight Garden (1999)
- Tomahawk (1951)
- Tomahawk Trail (1957)
- Tomake Chai (2017)
- Toman (2018)
- Tomb of the Angels (1937)
- The Tomb of Ligeia (1964)
- Tomb of the Pistolero (1964)
- Tomb Raider (2018)
- Tomb Robber (2014)
- Tomb of the Werewolf (2004)
- Tombiruo: Penunggu Rimba (2017)
- Tomboy: (1940, 1985, 2008 & 2011)
- Tomboy and the Champ (1961)
- Tombs of the Blind Dead (1972)
- Tombstone (1993)
- Tombstone Canyon (1932)
- Tombstone Rashomon (2017)
- Tombstone Terror (1935)
- Tombstone, the Town Too Tough to Die (1942)
- Tomcat (2016)
- Tomcat Combat (1959)
- Tomcats: (1977 & 2001)
- Tome of the Unknown (2013)
- Tomfoolery (1936)
- Tomiris (2019)
- Tomka and His Friends (1977)
- Tommaso: (2016 & 2019)
- Tommy: (1931, 1975 & 2015)
- Tommy Atkins: (1915 & 1928)
- Tommy Atkins in the Park (1898)
- Tommy Boy (1995)
- Tommy Cooper: Not Like That, Like This (2014 TV)
- Tommy the Toreador (1959)
- Tommy Tricker and the Stamp Traveller (1988)
- Tommy Tucker's Tooth (1922)
- Tommy's Atonement (1913)
- Tommy's Honour (2016)
- Tomorrow: (1972, 1988 & 2001)
- Tomorrow Ever After (2017)
- Tomorrow I'll Kill Myself (1942)
- Tomorrow I'll Wake Up and Scald Myself with Tea (1977)
- Tomorrow Is Another Day: (1951 American, 1951 Italian & 2017)
- Tomorrow at Dawn (2009)
- Tomorrow Is Forever (1946)
- Tomorrow Is My Turn (1960)
- Tomorrow Is Too Late (1950)
- Tomorrow It Will Be Better (1939)
- Tomorrow La Scala! (2002)
- Tomorrow Morning (2006)
- Tomorrow My Love (1971)
- Tomorrow Never Comes (1978)
- Tomorrow Never Dies (1997)
- Tomorrow Night (1998)
- Tomorrow at Seven (1933)
- Tomorrow at Ten (1962)
- Tomorrow and Tomorrow (1932)
- The Tomorrow War (2021)
- Tomorrow Was the War (1987)
- Tomorrow We Dance (1982)
- Tomorrow We Fly (1943)
- Tomorrow We Live: (1936, 1942 & 1943)
- Tomorrow We Move (2004)
- Tomorrow, When the War Began (2012)
- Tomorrow You're Gone (2012)
- Tomorrow's Another Day: (2000 & 2011)
- Tomorrow's Children (1934)
- Tomorrow's Love (1925)
- Tomorrow's World (1943)
- Tomorrowland (2015)
- Tomte Tummetott and the Fox (2007)
- Tomy's Secret (1963)

==== Ton ====
- À ton image (2004)
- A Ton of Luck (2006)
- Tone-Deaf (2019)
- Tonelli (1943)
- The Tong Man (1919)
- Tongpan (1977)
- The Tongues of Men (1916)
- Tongues Untied (1989)
- Tongzhi in Love (2008)
- Toni (1928)
- Toni (1935)
- Toni Erdmann (2016)
- Toni Morrison: The Pieces I Am (2019)
- Tonic (2021)
- Tonio (2016)
- Tonio Kröger (1964)
- Tonight a City Will Die (1961)
- Tonight at Eleven (1938)
- Tonight and Every Night (1945)
- Tonight Is Ours (1933)
- Tonight or Never: (1931, 1941 & 1961)
- Tonight Nobody Goes Home (1996)
- Tonight for Sure (1962)
- Tonight at Twelve (1929)
- Tonight We Raid Calais (1943)
- Tonight We Sing (1953)
- Tonight We'll Dance at Home (1972)
- Tonight's the Night (1932)
- Tonite Let's All Make Love in London (1967)
- Tonka (1958)
- Tonka of the Gallows (1930)
- Tonnerre (2013)
- Tons of Money: (1924 & 1930)
- Tons of Trouble (1956)
- Tonta, tonta, pero no tanto (1972)
- The Tonto Kid (1935)
- Tony: (1982, 2009, 2013, 2019 & 2026)
- Tony: Another Double Game (1980)
- Tony Hawk in Boom Boom Sabotage (2006)
- Tony Robbins: I Am Not Your Guru (2016)
- Tony Rome (1967)
- Tony Takitani (2004)
- Tonya and Nancy: The Inside Story (1994 TV)

==== Too ====
- Too Bad She's Bad (1955)
- Too Beautiful to Lie (2004)
- Too Beautiful for You (1989)
- Too Big to Fail (2011)
- Too Busy to Work: (1932 & 1939)
- Too Close for Comfort (1990)
- Too Colourful for the League (2001 TV)
- Too Cool to Kill (2022)
- Too Dangerous to Live (1939)
- Too Early/Too Late (1981)
- Too Fat Too Furious (2005)
- Too Funny to Fail (2017)
- Too Good to Be True (1988 TV)
- Too Hard to Handle (2016)
- Too Hot to Die (2018)
- Too Hot to Handle: (1938, 1960 & 1977)
- Too Late: (1996, 2000 & 2015)
- Too Late Blues (1961)
- Too Late to Die Young (2018)
- Too Late for Love (1967)
- Too Late to Love (1959)
- Too Late the Hero (1970)
- Too Late to Say Goodbye (2009 TV)
- Too Late for Tears (1949)
- Too Many Blondes (1941)
- Too Many Coincidences (2016)
- Too Many Cooks (1931)
- Too Many Crooks: (1927, 1930 & 1959)
- Too Many Girls (1940)
- Too Many Kisses (1925)
- Too Many Husbands (1940)
- Too Many Millions: (1918 & 1934)
- Too Many Parents (1936)
- Too Many Thieves (1967)
- Too Many Ways to Be No. 1 (1997)
- Too Many Winners (1947)
- Too Many Wives: (1933 & 1937)
- Too Many Women (1942)
- Too Much Beef (1936)
- Too Much Harmony (1933)
- Too Much Is Enough (1995)
- Too Much Johnson: (1919 & 1938)
- Too Much Money (1926)
- Too Much Pussy! (2010)
- Too Much Sex (2000)
- Too Much Speed (1921)
- Too Much Sun (1990)
- Too Much Wife (1922)
- Too Outrageous! (1987)
- Too Romantic (1992)
- Too Soon to Love (1960)
- Too Tired to Die (1998)
- Too Tough to Care (1964)
- Too Tough to Kill (1935)
- Too Wise Wives (1921)
- Too Young to Die? (1990 TV)
- Too Young to Die! (2016)
- Too Young the Hero (1988)
- Too Young to Kiss (1951)
- Too Young to Know (1945)
- Too Young for Love: (1953 & 1966)
- Too Young to Love (1959)
- Too Young to Marry: (1931 & 2017 TV)
- Toofaan (2021)
- Toofan: (1989, 2002 & 2024)
- Toofan Aur Bijlee (1975)
- Toofan Aur Deeya (1956)
- Toofan Singh (2017)
- Toofani Tarzan (1937)
- Tooken (2015)
- Toolbox Murders (2004)
- The Toolbox Murders (1978)
- Toomelah (2011)
- Toomorrow (1970)
- Toonpur Ka Superrhero (2010)
- Toot, Whistle, Plunk and Boom (1953)
- Tooth Fairy (2010)
- Tooth Fairy 2 (2012)
- The Tooth Fairy (2006)
- The Tooth and the Nail (2017)
- The Tooth Will Out (1951)
- Toothless (1997 TV)
- A Toothy Smile (1957)
- Toots (2006)
- Tootsie (1982)
- Tooty's Wedding (2010)

==== Top ====
- Top Banana (1954)
- Top Cat Begins (2015)
- Top Cat: The Movie (2011)
- Top Crack (1967)
- Top Dog: (1995 & 2014)
- The Top Dog (1918)
- Top End Wedding (2019)
- Top Five (2014)
- Top Floor Girl (1959)
- Top Floor, Left Wing (2010)
- Top Gear (2022)
- Top Gun (1955)
- Top Gun (1986)
- Top Gun: Maverick (2022)
- Top Hat (1935)
- Top Hero: (1994 & 2010)
- Top Knot Detective (2017)
- Top Man (1943)
- Top Priority (1981)
- Top Secret: (1952 & 1967)
- Top Secret! (1984)
- Top Secret Affair (1957)
- Top Secret Rosies: The Female "Computers" of WWII (2010 TV)
- Top Sergeant (1942)
- Top of the World (1997)
- Topaz: (1945 & 1969)
- Topkapi (1964)
- El Topo (1970)
- Topper (1937)
- Topper Returns (1941)
- Topsy-Turvy (1999)

==== Tor ====
- Tora (2004)
- Tora Dine Ku Mora Dine (2016)
- Tora! Tora! Tora! (1970)
- Tora's Husband (2022)
- Torawakamaru the Koga Ninja (1957)
- Torbaaz (2020)
- The Torch (1950)
- The Torch Bearer (1916)
- Torch Singer (1933)
- Torch Song: (1953, 1993 TV & 2024)
- Torch Song Trilogy (1988)
- The Torchbearer (2005)
- Torched (2004)
- Torchlight: (1985 & 2018)
- Torero! (1956)
- Tori and Lokita (2022)
- Torkaman (1974)
- Torment: (1924, 1944, 1950 British, 1950 Italian, 1974, 1986 & 2013)
- Torment of the Past (1952)
- Tormented: (1960, 2009 British, 2009 Salvadorean & 2011)
- Tormented Soul (1950)
- Torments of the Night (1926)
- Torn: (2013 American, 2013 Nigerian & 2021)
- Torn Between Two Lovers (1979 TV)
- Torn Curtain (1966)
- Torn from the Flag (2007)
- Torn Hearts (2022)
- A Torn Lily (1953)
- Torn Memories of Nanjing (2009)
- Torn Sails (1920)
- Tornado: (1943 & 2025)
- Tornado! (1996 TV)
- The Tornado: (1917 & 1924)
- Tornado Glory (2006)
- Tornado: The Last Blood (1983)
- Torno a vivere da solo (2008)
- Torno indietro e cambio vita (2015)
- Toro (2016)
- The Toronto Rap Project (2006)
- Torpedo: (2012 & 2019)
- Torpedo Alley (1952)
- Torpedo Bay (1963)
- Torpedo Boat (1942)
- Torpedo Bombers (1983)
- Torpedo Run (1958)
- A Tornado in the Saddle (1942)
- Torpedo Squadron 8 (1942)
- Torque (2004)
- Torremolinos 73 (2003)
- Torrent (1926)
- The Torrent: (1921, 1924 & 2012)
- Torrente series:
  - Torrente, the Dumb Arm of the Law (1998)
  - Torrente 2: Mission in Marbella (2001)
  - Torrente 3: el protector (2005)
  - Torrente 4: Lethal Crisis (2011)
  - Torrente 5: Operación Eurovegas (2014)
  - Torrente, presidente (2026)
- Torrents of Spring: (1942 & 1989)
- Torrents of Steel (1967)
- Torrid Noon (1966)
- Torrid Zone (1940)
- Torso (1973)
- Torso: The Evelyn Dick Story (2002 TV)
- Tortilla Flaps (1958)
- Tortilla Flat (1942)
- Tortilla Heaven (2007)
- Tortilla Soup (2002)
- The Tortoise and the Hare: (1935 & 2008)
- Tortoise Beats Hare (1941)
- Tortoise in Love (2012)
- Tortoise Wins by a Hare (1943)
- Tortura nadziei (1967)
- Torture Chamber (2013)
- Torture Garden (1967)
- Torture Me But Kill Me with Kisses (1968)
- Torture Room (2010)
- Torture Ship (1939)
- The Torture of Silence (1917)
- Tortured (2008)
- The Tortured (2010)
- Tortured Soul (1919)
- Torturing Democracy (2008)
- Torvill & Dean (2018 TV)
- ToryBoy The Movie (2011)

==== Tos–Tot ====
- Tosca: (1941, 1956 & 2001)
- Tosca's Kiss (1984)
- Toscana (2022)
- Toscanini: In His Own Words (2008)
- Toscanini: The Maestro (1985 TV)
- Tosun Paşa (1976)
- Tot Watchers (1958)
- Total Badass (2010)
- Total Balalaika Show (1994)
- Total Dadagiri (2018)
- Total Denial (2006)
- Total Dhamaal (2019)
- Total Eclipse (1995)
- Total Exposure (1991)
- Total Force 2 (1997)
- Total Frat Movie (2016)
- Total Loss: (2000 & 2024)
- Total Reality (1997)
- Total Recall: (1990 & 2012)
- Totally Awesome (2006 TV)
- Totally Blonde (2001)
- Totally F***ed Up (1993)
- Totally Killer (2023)
- Totally Personal (2005)
- Totally Spies! The Movie (2009)
- Totally True Love (2011)
- Totally Under Control (2020)
- Totapuri: Chapter 1 (2022)
- Totapuri: Chapter 2 (2023)
- Totem (2017)
- Tótem (2023)
- Toto the Hero (1991)
- Toto the Sheik (1950)
- Toto the Third Man (1951)

==== Tou–Tov ====
- Touch (1997)
- Touch (2014)
- Touch (2022)
- Touch (2024)
- The Touch: (1971 & 2002)
- Touch Chesi Chudu (2018)
- A Touch of Class (1973)
- Touch of Death: (1961 & 1990)
- Touch of Evil (1958)
- A Touch of Fever (1993)
- Touch & Go (2002)
- Touch and Go: 1955, 1980, 1986 & 1991)
- Touch of the Light (2012)
- Touch Me (1997)
- Touch Me in the Morning (1999)
- Touch Me Not (2018)
- Touch of Pink (2004)
- A Touch of Sin (2013)
- Touch the Sky (2007)
- Touch the Sound (2004)
- Touch the Wall (2014)
- A Touch of Zen (1971)
- Touchback (2011)
- Touchdown: (1931 & 2024)
- Touchdown, Army (1938)
- Touché and Go (1957)
- Touched: (1983 & 2017)
- Touched By Evil (1997 TV)
- Touched with Fire (2015)
- Touched by Love (1980)
- Touchez pas au grisbi (1954)
- Touching Home (2008)
- Touching Starlight (1996)
- Touching the Void (2003)
- Touchy Feely (2013)
- Tough (1974)
- Tough Assignment (1949)
- Tough Beauty and the Sloppy Slop (1995)
- Tough Enough: (1983 & 2006)
- Tough Guy (1936)
- Tough Guys: (1960, 1986 & 2017)
- Tough Guys Don't Dance (1987)
- Tough Guys, Easy Girls (1927)
- Tough Guys of the Prairie (1970)
- Touken Ranbu (2019)
- Tour de Force (2014)
- Tour de France (2016)
- The Tourist: (1921, 1925 & 2010)
- Tourist Trap (1979)
- The Tournament (2009)
- Tous les Matins du Monde (1991)
- Tout Va Bien (1972)
- Tovarich (1937)

==== Tow–Toz ====
- Tow (2026)
- Toward Independence (1948)
- Towards the Sun (1955)
- Toward the Unknown (1956)
- Towards Evening (1990)
- Towards Glory (1949)
- Towards the Light: (1918 & 1919)
- Towards the Sun (1955)
- Towards Zero (2007)
- Towed in a Hole (1932)
- Towelhead (2008)
- Tower: (1987, 2012 & 2016)
- Tower Bawher (2005)
- Towel Block (2012)
- Tower of Evil (1972)
- Tower of the Firstborn (1999)
- Tower Heist (2011)
- Tower House (1962)
- Tower of London: (1939 & 1962)
- Tower of Love (1974)
- Tower of Lust (1955)
- Tower to the People (2015)
- Tower of Terror: (1913, 1941 & 1997)
- The Towering Inferno (1974)
- Towers of Silence (1952)
- Towheads (2013)
- The Town: (1945 & 2010)
- Town Bus (1955)
- Town & Country (2001)
- A Town Called Panic (2009)
- Town of the Dragon (2014)
- A Town Like Alice (1956)
- Town Tamer (1965)
- The Town That Dreaded Sundown: (1976 & 2014)
- Town on Trial (1957)
- Town Without Pity (1961)
- Towncraft (2007)
- Toxic (2010)
- The Toxic Avenger series:
  - The Toxic Avenger: (1984 & 2023)
  - The Toxic Avenger Part II (1989)
  - The Toxic Avenger Part III: The Last Temptation of Toxie (1989)
  - Citizen Toxie: The Toxic Avenger IV (2000)
- Toxic Beauty (2019)
- Toxic Clouds of 9/11 (2006)
- Toxic Legacy (2006)
- Toxic Love (1983)
- Toxic Man (2018)
- Toxic Zombies (1980)
- The Toy (1982)
- Toy Love (2002)
- Toy Soldiers: (1984, 1991 & 2010)
- Toy Story series:
  - Toy Story (1995)
  - Toy Story 2 (1999)
  - Toy Story 3 (2010)
  - Toy Story 4 (2019)
  - Toy Story 5 (2026)
- Toy Tinkers (1949)
- Toyland (2007)
- Toys (1992)
- Toys in the Attic: (1963 & 2009)
- Toz (2005)

=== Tr ===
==== Tra ====
- Trabbi Goes to Hollywood (1991)
- The Trace (1994)
- Trace of a Girl (1967)
- The Trace Leads to the Silver Lake (1990)
- The Trace of Some Lips (1952)
- Trace of Stones (1966)
- Tracer (2016)
- Traceroute (2016)
- Tracers (2015)
- Traces of an Amorous Life (1990)
- Traces of Death (1993)
- Traces of a Dragon (2003)
- Traces of Light (1943)
- The Traces of Light (1996)
- Traces of Love (2006)
- Traces of the Past (1950)
- Traces of Red (1992)
- Traces of Sandalwood (2014)
- Traces of the Trade: A Story from the Deep North (2008)
- Tracey (2018)
- The Tracey Fragments (2007)
- The Track (1975)
- The Track (2025)
- Track Down (2000)
- Trackdown (1976)
- The Tracker (1988) (TV)
- The Tracker (2002)
- The Trackers (1971) (TV)
- Tracks (2013)
- The Tractate Middoth (2013) (tV)
- The Trade (2023)
- The Trader (2018)
- The Trading Floor (2018)
- Trading Places (1983)
- Traffic: (2000, 2011 & 2016)
- The Traffic Cop (1926)
- The Traffic Policeman (1960)
- The Traffickers (2012)
- Traffik (2018)
- Trafic: (1971 & 2004)
- The Tragedy of Castle Rottersheim (1916)
- The Tragedy of Deaf Sam-yong (1973)
- Tragedy Girls (2017)
- The Tragedy of Macbeth (2021)
- A Tragedy at Midnight (1942)
- A Tragedy of the Orient (1914)
- Tragic Jungle (2020)
- The Trail Beyond (1934)
- The Trail of the Lonesome Pine: (1916, 1923 & 1936)
- Trailer Park Boys: The Movie (2006)
- Trailer Park of Terror (2008)
- Train (2009)
- The Train: (1964, 1970, 1973, 2007 & 2011)
- Train to Busan (2016)
- A Train Leaves in Every Hour (1961)
- Train of Life (1998)
- A Train in the Night (1934)
- Train Ride (2005)
- The Train Robbers (1973)
- Training Day (2001)
- Trainspotting (1996)
- Trainwreck (2015)
- Traitor (2008)
- The Traitor: (1936 American, 1936 German, 1957 & 2019)
- Traitor or Patriot (2000)
- Traitor's Gate (1964)
- The Traitors (1962)
- The Tramp (1915)
- The Tramp Dentists (1913)
- Trance: (2013 & 2020)
- Trance and Dance in Bali (1952)
- Trancers (1985)
- Trances (1981)
- Transamerica (2005)
- Transcendence (2014)
- Transfer: (1966 & 2010)
- The Transfiguration (2016)
- Transformers film series:
  - The Transformers: The Movie (1986)
  - Transformers (2007)
  - Transformers: Revenge of the Fallen (2009)
  - Transformers: Dark of the Moon (2011)
  - Transformers: Age of Extinction (2014)
  - Transformers: The Last Knight (2017)
  - Transformers: Rise of the Beasts (2023)
  - Transformers One (2024)
- Transit: (1980, 2005 TV, 2006, 2012, 2013 & 2018)
- A Translator (2018)
- Transmorphers (2007)
- Transmorphers: Fall of Man (2009)
- The Transporter film series:
  - The Transporter (2002)
  - Transporter 2 (2005)
  - Transporter 3 (2008)
  - The Transporter Refueled (2015)
- Transsiberian (2008)
- Transylmania (2009)
- Transylvania 6-5000: (1963 & 1985)
- Trap (2015 & 2024)
- A Trap (1997)
- Trap for Cinderella: (1965 & 2013)
- Trap for a Lonely Man (1990)
- A Trap for Santa Claus (1909)
- Trapeze (1956)
- Trapped: (1949 & 2002)
- Trapped in Paradise (1994)
- Trash (1970)
- Trauma: (1962, 1993 & 2004)
- Trauma Center (2019)
- Traumschiff Surprise - Periode 1 (2004)
- A Traveler's Needs (2024)
- Travellers and Magicians (2003)
- Travels with My Aunt (1972)

==== Tre ====
- Treachery (2013)
- Treachery on the High Seas (1936)
- Treachery Rides the Range (1936)
- Treacle Jr. (2010)
- Tread (2019)
- Tread Softly: (1952 & 1965)
- Tread Softly Stranger (1958)
- Treading Water (2001)
- Treason: (1917, 1918, 1933, 1959 & 1964)
- Treasure of the Aztecs (1921)
- Treasure Buddies (2012)
- Treasure of the Four Crowns (1983)
- Treasure Hunt: (1952, 1994 & 2003)
- Treasure Hunters (1981)
- Treasure Inn (2011)
- Treasure Island: (1918, 1920, 1934, 1938, 1950, 1971, 1972, 1973, 1982, 1985, 1988, 1990 TV, 1995 & 1999)
- Treasure of Matecumbe (1976)
- Treasure of Monte Cristo (1949)
- Treasure Planet (2002)
- Treasure Raiders (2007)
- Treasure of Ruby Hills (1955)
- Treasure of San Gennaro (1966)
- The Treasure of the Sierra Madre (1948)
- The Treatment (2001)
- A Tree Grows in Brooklyn: (1945 & 1974 TV)
- Treehouse (2014)
- The Tree of Life (2011)
- The Tree of Might (1990)
- A Tree of Palme (2002)
- The Tree of Wooden Clogs (1978)
- Trees Lounge (1996)
- Treevenge (2008)
- Trekkies (1997)
- Trekkies 2 (2004)
- Tremble All You Want (2017)
- Tremors series:
  - Tremors (1990)
  - Tremors 2: Aftershocks (1996)
  - Tremors 3: Back to Perfection (2001)
  - Tremors 4: The Legend Begins (2004)
  - Tremors 5: Bloodlines (2015)
  - Tremors: A Cold Day in Hell (2018)
  - Tremors: Shrieker Island (2020)
- Trench 11 (2017)
- Trenchcoat (1983)
- Trenchcoat in Paradise (1989 TV)
- Trenck (1932)
- Tres muchachas de Jalisco (1964)
- Tres mujeres en la hoguera (1976)
- Trespass: (1992 & 2011)
- Trespass Against Us (2016)
- The Trespasser: (1929 & 1947)
- Tressette: A Story of an Island (2006)
- Trevor (1994)

==== Tri ====
- The Trial: (1948, 1962, 1993, 2006, 2009, 2010 & 2014)
- The Trial of Billy Jack (1974)
- Trial by Fire (2018)
- The Trial of the Chicago 7 (2020)
- Trial and Error (1997)
- The Trial of Joan of Arc (1962)
- The Trials of Oscar Wilde (1960)
- Triangle: (2007, 2009 British & 2009 South Korean)
- The Triangle (2001) (TV)
- Triangle of Sadness (2022)
- The Tribe: (1998 TV, 2005, 2014 & 2018)
- Tribes (1970) (TV)
- The Tribes of Palos Verdes (2017)
- Tribhanga (2021)
- Tribute: (1980 & 2009)
- Trick: (1999 & 2019)
- Trick Baby (1972)
- Trick or Treat: (1952, 1986 & unreleased)
- Trick 'r Treat (2007)
- Tricks: (1925 & 2007)
- Tricky Brains (1990)
- The Tricky Master (1999)
- The Trigger Effect (1996)
- Triggered (2020)
- Trigun: Badlands Rumble (2010)
- Trilogy of Terror (1975) (TV)
- Trilogy of Terror II (1996) (TV)
- Trinity: (2003 & 2016)
- Trinity Rides Again (1969)
- Trinity Is Still My Name (1971)
- Trip (2021)
- The Trip: (1967, 2002 & 2010)
- The Trip to Bountiful (1985)
- The Trip to Greece (2020)
- The Trip to Italy (2014)
- A Trip to the Moon (1902)
- The Trip to Spain (2017)
- Tripfall (2000)
- Triple 9 (2016)
- The Triple Echo (1972)
- Triple Frontier (2019)
- Triple Threat: (1948 & 2019)
- Triple Trouble: (1918 & 1950)
- The Triplets of Belleville (2003)
- Triplex (1991)
- Trishna: (1978, 2009 & 2011)
- Tristan & Isolde (2006)
- Tristana (1970)
- Tristram Shandy: A Cock and Bull Story (2006)
- The Triumph of Love: (1922 & 2001)
- Triumph of the Nerds (1996) (TV)
- Triumph of the Son of Hercules (1961)
- Triumph of the Spirit (1989)
- The Triumph of the Weak (1918)
- Triumph of the Will (1935)
- Triumphs of a Man Called Horse (1983)
- Trixie (2000)

==== Tro ====
- Trobriand Cricket (1977)
- Trocadero (1944)
- Troika (1930)
- Troika (1969)
- Trog (1970)
- Trois (2000)
- Trois 2: Pandora's Box (2002)
- Trois: The Escort (2004)
- Trois milliards sans ascenseur (1972)
- Trojan Eddie (1996)
- The Trojan Horse (1961)
- Trojan War (1997)
- Trojan Warrior (2002)
- The Trojan Women (1971)
- Troll: (1986 & 2022)
- Troll 2: (1990 & 2025)
- A Troll in Central Park (1994)
- Troll Factory (2024)
- The Troll Hunter (2010)
- Troll i ord (1954)
- Troll: The Tale of a Tail (2018)
- Troll-elgen (1927)
- The Trollenberg Terror (1958)
- Trolley Troubles (1927)
- Trollywood (2004)
- Trollhunters: Rise of the Titans (2021)
- Trolls series:
  - Trolls (2016)
  - Trolls World Tour (2020)
  - Trolls Band Together (2023)
- Troma's War (1988)
- Tromba (1949)
- Trombone Trouble (1944)
- Tromeo and Juliet (1996)
- Tron series:
  - Tron (1982)
  - Tron: Legacy (2010)
  - Tron: Ares (2025)
- Troop 1500 (2005)
- Troop Beverly Hills (1989)
- Trooper Campbell (1914)
- Trooper Clerks (2003)
- Trooper Hook (1957)
- Trooper O'Brien (1928)
- Trooper O'Neill (1922)
- Troopers Three (1930)
- Troops (1997)
- Trop c'est trop (1975)
- Trop de bonheur (1994)
- Trop jolies pour être honnêtes (1972)
- Trophy (2017)
- Trophy Kids (2011)
- Trophy Kids (2013)
- Trophy Wife (2014)
- Tropic of Cancer (1970)
- Tropic of Emerald (1997)
- Tropic Fury (1939)
- Tropic Holiday (1938)
- Tropic of Ice (1987)
- Tropic Madness (1928)
- Tropic Thunder (2008)
- Tropic Zone (1953)
- Tropical Fish (1995)
- Tropical Heat Wave (1952)
- Tropical Love (1921)
- Tropical Malady (2004)
- Tropical Nights (1928)
- Tropical Nights (1931)
- Tropical Snow (1988)
- Tropical Soul (1924)
- Tropical Trouble (1936)
- Tropical-Rouge! Pretty Cure the Movie: The Snow Princess and the Miraculous Ring! (2021)
- Tropico (2013)
- Tropix (2002)
- Troppo forte (1986)
- The Trouble with Angels (1966)
- Trouble Backstairs: (1935 & 1949)
- Trouble with the Curve (2012)
- Trouble Every Day (2001)
- The Trouble with Girls (1969)
- The Trouble with Harry (1955)
- Trouble Makers: (1948 & 2006)
- Trouble Man (1972)
- The Trouble with Men and Women (2003)
- Trouble in Paradise (1932)
- Troubled Laughter (1979)
- Troy (2004)

==== Tru ====
- Tru Confessions (2002) (TV)
- The Truants (1922)
- The Truce (1997)
- Truck Turner (1974)
- Trucks (1997) (TV)
- Trudell (2005)
- The True Adventures of Wolfboy (2019)
- True Believer (1989)
- True Confessions (1981)
- True Crime: (1996 & 1999)
- True Grit: (1969 & 2010)
- True Heart Susie (1919)
- True History of the Kelly Gang (2019)
- True Lies (1994)
- True Love: (1989 & 2012)
- True Memoirs of an International Assassin (2016)
- True Romance (1993)
- True Stories (1986)
- True Story (2015)
- The True Story of Ah Q (1981)
- The True Story of the Civil War (1956)
- The True Story of Jesse James (1957)
- True Things (2021)
- The Truffle Hunters (2020)
- Truly, Madly, Deeply (1990)
- The Truman Show (1998)
- Trumbo: (2007 & 2015)
- Trump Card: (2009 & 2020)
- The Trump Prophecy (2018)
- Trump: The Kremlin Candidate? (2017) (TV)
- Trump: What's the Deal? (1991)
- Trumped: (2009 & 2017)
- The Trumpet of the Swan (2001)
- Trunk to Cairo (1966)
- Trust: (1976, 1990, 1999 TV, 2010, 2021 & 2025)
- The Trust: (1915, 1993 & 2016)
- Trust the Man (2006)
- Trust Me: (1989, 2007, 2010 & 2013)
- Trusting Is Good... Shooting Is Better (1968)
- The Truth: (1960, 1988, 1998, 2006 & 2019)
- The Truth About Cats & Dogs (1996)
- The Truth About Charlie (2002)
- The Truth About Love (2004)
- The Truth About Mother Goose (1957)
- Truth or Consequences, N.M. (1997)
- Truth or Dare (2018)
- Truth or Dare (1991)
- Truth in Numbers? (2010)

==== Try ====
- Try and Get It (1924)
- Try Harder! (2021)
- Try Not to Breathe (2006)
- The Try Out (1916)
- Try to Remember (2004)
- Try This One for Size (1989)
- Try and Win (1952)
- The Trygon Factor (1966)
- Trying to Get Arrested (1909)
- The Trypillia Tragedy (1926)

=== Ts–Tt ===
- Tsar (2009)
- Tsar Ivan the Terrible (1991)
- Tsar to Lenin (1937)
- Tsarevich Alexei (1997)
- Tsarevich Prosha (1974)
- Tsatsiki, morsan och polisen (1999)
- Tsatsiki – vänner för alltid (2001)
- Tsotsi (2005)
- Tsubasa no gaika (1942)
- Tsubasa Reservoir Chronicle the Movie: The Princess in the Birdcage Kingdom (2005)
- Tsuchi (1939)
- Tsugaru Folk Song (1973)
- Tsukue no Nakami (2007)
- Tsukuroi Tatsu Hito (2015)
- Tsunami (2020)
- Tsure ga Utsu ni Narimashite (2011)
- TT3D: Closer to the Edge (2011)

=== Tu ===
- Tu as crié Let Me Go (1997)
- Tu Hai Mera Sunday (2017)
- Tu Hi Re (2015)
- Tu ten kámen (1923)
- Tu Maza Jeev (2009)
- Tu Mera 22 Main Tera 22 (2013)
- Tu mi turbi (1983)
- Tu Mo Hero (2017)
- Tu Mo Love Story (2017)
- Tu Nahin Aur Sahi (1960)
- Tu ne tueras point (1961)
- Tu Tithe Mee (1998)

==== Tua–Tuy ====
- Tuareg – The Desert Warrior (1984)
- Tub Girls (1967)
- Tuba Atlantic (2010)
- A Tuba to Cuba (2018)
- Tubby the Tuba: (1947 & 1975)
- Tube (2003)
- Tube Tales (1999)
- Tubelight: (2017 Hindi & 2017 Tamil)
- Tuck Everlasting: (1981 & 2002)
- Tucker & Dale vs. Evil (2010)
- Tucker: The Man and His Dream (1988)
- Tucson (1949)
- Tudo Bem (1978)
- Tudor Rose (1936)
- Tuesday (2008)
- Tuesday (2023)
- Tuesday, After Christmas (2010)
- Tuesday in November (1945)
- Tuesday's Guest (1950)
- Tuesdays with Morrie (1999)
- Tuff Turf (1985)
- Tug of War (2006)
- Tug of War (2021)
- Tugboat Annie (1933)
- Tugboat Annie Sails Again (1940)
- Tugboat Granny (1956)
- Tugboat M 17 (1933)
- Tugboat Princess (1936)
- Tui Amar Rani (2019)
- Tujhe Meri Kasam (2003)
- Tujhe Nahin Chhodunga (1989)
- Tujhse He Raabta (2015 TV)
- Tukaram (2012)
- Tula: The Revolt (2013)
- Tula Kalnnaar Nahi (2017)
- Tulad ng Dati (2006)
- Tulips Shall Grow (1942)
- Tulip Fever (2017)
- Tully (2018)
- Tulsa (1949)
- The Tulsa Kid (1940)
- Tumbbad (2018)
- Tumbleweeds (1925)
- Tumbleweeds (1999)
- Tumko Na Bhool Paayenge (2002)
- The Tune (1992)
- Tuner (2026)
- The Tuner (2004)
- Tunes of Glory (1960)
- The Tunnel: (1915, 1933 French-language, 1933 German-language, 1935, 1962, 2001, 2009, 2011, 2014 & 2019)
- The Tunnel of Love (1958)
- The Tunnel Under the World (1969)
- Tunnel Vision: (1976 & 1995)
- Tupac: Resurrection (2003)
- Turbo (2013)
- Turbo Kid (2015)
- Turbo: A Power Rangers Movie (1997)
- Turbo Time (1983)
- Turbulence: (2000 & 2011)
- Turbulence series:
  - Turbulence (1997)
  - Turbulence 2: Fear of Flying (1999)
  - Turbulence 3: Heavy Metal (2001)
- A Turf Conspiracy (1918)
- The Turin Horse (2011)
- Turistas (2006)
- Turk 182 (1985)
- The Turkey (1951)
- The Turkey Bowl (2019)
- Turkey Hollow (2015)
- Turkey Shoot: (1982 & 2014)
- Turkey Time: (1933 & 1970 TV)
- The Turkish Cucumbers (1962)
- Turkish Delight: (1927 & 1973)
- The Turkish Gambit (2005)
- The Turkish Passion (1994)
- Turkish Passport (2011)
- Turks & Caicos (2014 TV)
- Turksib (1929)
- The Turmoil: (1916 & 1924)
- The Turn (2012)
- The Turn of a Card (1918)
- A Turn of the Cards (1914)
- The Turn of the Century (2001)
- Turn It Up (2000)
- Turn Left, Turn Right (2003)
- Turn Me On, Dammit! (2011)
- The Turn in the Road (1919)
- The Turn of the Screw: (1974 & 2009)
- The Turn of the Wheel (1918)
- Turner & Hooch (1989)
- The Turners of Prospect Road (1947)
- The Turning: (1992, 2013 & 2020)
- The Turning Door (2017)
- The Turning Point: (1920, 1945, 1952, 1952, 1977, 1978 & 1983)
- Turning Red (2022)
- Turok: Son of Stone (2008)
- Turtle Beach (1992)
- A Turtle's Tale: Sammy's Adventures (2010)
- A Turtle's Tale 2: Sammy's Escape from Paradise (2012)
- Turtles Can Fly (2004)
- Turtles Forever (2009) (TV)
- Tuscaloosa (2019)
- Tuscan Wedding (2014)
- Tusk (1980)
- Tusk (2014)
- The Tuskegee Airmen (1995 TV)
- Tutta colpa di Freud (2014)
- Tutta la città canta (1945)
- Tutti defunti... tranne i morti (1977)
- The Tuttles of Tahiti (1942)
- Tutto il mondo ride (1952)
- Tutto l'amore che c'è (2000)
- Tutto molto bello (2014)
- Tutto tutto niente niente (2012)
- Tuvalu (1999)
- The Tuxedo (2002)
- Tuxedo Junction (1941)
- Tuya en cuerpo y alma (1944)
- Tuya's Marriage (2006)

=== Tv ===
- The TV Set (2006)

=== Tw ===
==== Twe ====
- Tweek City (2005)
- Tween Academy: Class of 2012 (2011)
- Tweet and Lovely (1959)
- Tweet and Sour (1956)
- Tweet Tweet Tweety (1951)
- Tweet Zoo (1957)
- Tweet's Ladies of Pasadena (1970)
- Tweetie Pie (1947)
- Tweety and the Beanstalk (1957)
- Tweety's Circus (1955)
- Tweety's High-Flying Adventure (2000)
- Tweety's S.O.S. (1951)
- The Twelfth Juror (1913)
- Twelfth Night: (1910, 1933, 1955, 1966 TV, 1970 TV, 1980, 1986 & 1996)
- Twelve (2010)
- The Twelve Chairs: (1970, 1971 & 1976)
- Twelve Disciples of Nelson Mandela (2005)
- Twelve Monkeys (1995)
- The Twelve Months: (1956 & 1972)
- Twelve Months (1980)
- Twelve O'Clock High (1949)
- The Twelve Tasks of Asterix (1976)
- Twentieth Century (1934)
- The Twentieth Century (2019)
- Twenty Bucks (1993)
- Twenty Four Seven (1997)
- Twenty Minutes of Love (1914)
- Twenty-Four Eyes (1954)
- Twentynine Palms (2003)

==== Twi ====
- Twice Blessed (1945)
- Twice Born (1983)
- Twice Born (2012)
- Twice Branded (1936)
- Twice Colonized (2023)
- Twice Married (1930)
- Twice a Man (1963)
- Twice as Nice (1989)
- Twice Round the Daffodils (1962)
- Twice Two (1933)
- Twice Upon a Christmas (2001) (TV)
- Twice Upon a Time (1953)
- Twice Upon a Time (1983)
- Twice Upon a Time (1998)
- Twice Upon a Time... (1979)
- Twice Upon a Yesterday (1998)
- Twice a Woman (2010)
- Twice-Told Tales (1963)
- Twig (2024)
- Twiggy (2011)
- Twilight (1940)
- Twilight (1944)
- Twilight (1945)
- Twilight (1969)
- Twilight (1998)
- Twilight (2007)
- Twilight of the Cockroaches (1987)
- Twilight for the Gods (1958)
- Twilight of Honor (1963)
- Twilight Hour (1945)
- Twilight of the Ice Nymphs (1997)
- Twilight Kitchen (2003)
- Twilight: Los Angeles (2000)
- Twilight of Love (1977)
- Twilight Online (2014)
- Twilight Over Burma (2015)
- Twilight Portrait (2011)
- Twilight on the Prairie (1944)
- Twilight on the Rio Grande (1947)
- The Twilight Saga series:
  - Twilight (2008)
  - The Twilight Saga: New Moon (2009)
  - The Twilight Saga: Eclipse (2010)
  - The Twilight Saga: Breaking Dawn – Part 1 (2011)
  - The Twilight Saga: Breaking Dawn – Part 2 (2012)
- The Twilight Samurai (2002)
- Twilight of Shadows (2014)
- Twilight in the Sierras (1950)
- Twilight Time (1982)
- Twilight on the Trail (1941)
- Twilight Train (1957)
- Twilight of the Warriors: Walled In (2024)
- Twilight of a Woman's Soul (1913)
- Twilight Zone: Rod Serling's Lost Classics (1984) (TV)
- Twilight Zone: The Movie (1983)
- Twilight's Last Gleaming (1977)
- Twin Beds (1920)
- Twin Beds (1929)
- Twin Beds (1942)
- Twin Dragons (1992)
- Twin Faces (1937)
- Twin Falls Idaho (1999)
- Twin Flats (1916)
- Twin Flower (2018)
- Twin Husbands (1933)
- Twin Kiddies (1917)
- Twin Murders: The Silence of the White City (2019)
- Twin Peaks: Fire Walk with Me (1992)
- Twin Rivers (2007)
- Twin Sisters (1934)
- Twin Sisters (2002)
- Twin Sisters (2013)
- Twin Sisters of Kyoto (1963)
- Twin Sitters (1994)
- Twin Town (1997)
- Twin Triplets (1935)
- Twinkle, Twinkle Lucky Stars (1995)
- Twinless (2025)
- Twins (1925)
- Twins (1988)
- The Twins: (1923 & 2005)
- The Twins Effect (2003)
- The Twins Effect II (2004)
- Twins of Evil (1971)
- Twins Hinahima (2025) (TV)
- Twins Mission (2007)
- Twist (2003)
- Twist (2021)
- The Twist (1976)
- Twist Around the Clock (1961)
- Twist of Fate (1954)
- Twist and Shout (1984)
- Twisted (1985)
- Twisted (1996)
- Twisted (2004)
- Twisted (2026)
- Twisted Desire (1996) (TV)
- Twisted Issues (1988)
- Twisted Justice (2016)
- Twisted Mistress (1942)
- Twisted Nerve (1968)
- Twisted Nightmare (1988)
- Twisted Obsession (1990)
- Twisted Pair (2018)
- Twisted Rails (1934)
- Twisted Triggers (1926)
- Twister (1989)
- Twister (1996)
- Twister's Revenge! (1988)
- Twisters (2024)
- Twists of Fate (2007)
- Twists of Terror (1997) (TV)
- Twitch (2005)
- Twixt (2011)

==== Two ====
- Two Against the World: (1932 & 1936)
- Two Arabian Knights (1927)
- Two Brothers: (1929 & 2004)
- The Two Brothers (1910)
- Two Can Play That Game (2001)
- Two Distant Strangers (2020)
- Two in a Car (1932)
- Two Cops (1993)
- Two Days, One Night (2014)
- Two Daughters (1961)
- Two English Girls (1971)
- Two Evil Eyes (1990)
- The Two Faces of Dr. Jekyll (1960)
- Two Girls and a Guy (1997)
- Two Great Sheep (2004)
- Two on a Guillotine (1965)
- Two Hands (1999)
- Two Hands: The Leon Fleisher Story (2006)
- Two If by Sea (1996)
- The Two Jakes (1974)
- Two of a Kind: (1951 & 1983)
- Two Knights from Brooklyn (1949)
- The Two Lives of Mattia Pascal (1985)
- Two Lottery Tickets (2016)
- Two Lovers: (1928 & 2008)
- Two Lovers and a Bear (2016)
- Two Men in Town: (1973 & 2014)
- Two Men and a Wardrobe (1958)
- Two for the Money (2005)
- Two Moon Junction (1988)
- The Two Mrs. Carrolls (1947)
- Two Much (1995)
- Two Mules for Sister Sara (1970)
- Two Night Stand (2014)
- Two Plus Fours (1930)
- The Two Popes (2019)
- Two for the Road (1967)
- Two Rode Together (1961)
- Two for the Seesaw (1962)
- Two Solitudes (1978)
- Two Stage Sisters (1964)
- Two Tars (1928)
- Two Thousand Maniacs! (1964)
- Two or Three Things I Know About Her (1967)
- Two of Us: (1987 TV, 2000 TV & 2019)
- The Two of Us: (1967 & 2014)
- Two on a Vacation (1940)
- Two Weeks: (1920 & 2006)
- Two Weeks Notice (2002)
- Two Women: (1960, 1947 & 1999)
- The Two Worlds of Jennie Logan (1979) (TV)
- Two-Bit Waltz (2014)
- Two-Buldi-Two (1929)
- Two-Dollar Bettor (1951)
- Two-Faced Woman (1941)
- Two-Fisted (1935)
- Two-Fisted Gentleman (1936)
- Two-Fisted Jones (1925)
- Two-Fisted Law (1932)
- Two-Fisted Rangers (1939)
- Two-Fisted Sheriff (1937)
- A Two-Fisted Sheriff (1925)
- Two-Fisted Stranger (1946)
- Two-Fisted Tales (1992) (TV)
- Two-Gun Betty (1918)
- Two-Gun Caballero (1931)
- Two-Gun Gussie (1918)
- Two-Lane Blacktop (1971)
- Two-Minute Warning (1976)
- Two-Way Stretch (1960)
- Two's Company (1936)
- The Twonky (1953)

=== Tx–Ty ===
- TxT (2006)
- Tyaag (1977)
- Tyaag (2004)
- Tyagayya (1946)
- Tyagayya (1981)
- Tyagi (1992)
- Tycoon (1947)
- Tycoon (2002)
- Tyger Tyger (2021)
- Tyler (1978 TV)
- Typeface (2009)
- Typhoon (1933)
- Typhoon (1940)
- Typhoon (2005)
- The Typhoon (1914)
- Typhoon Noruda (2015)
- The Typist (1931)
- The Typist Gets Married (1934)
- Tyrannosaur (2011)
- The Tyrant Father (1941)
- The Tyrant of Padua (1946)
- The Tyrant's Heart (1981)
- Tyrel (2018)
- Tyrus (2015)
- Tyson (1995)
- Tyson (2008)
- Tyson (2016)

Previous: List of films: S Next: List of films: U–W

== See also ==
- Lists of films
- Lists of actors
- List of film and television directors
- List of documentary films
- List of film production companies
