= Tomorrow's Another Day =

Tomorrow's Another Day may refer to:

- Tomorrow's Another Day (2000 film), French film
- Tomorrow's Another Day (2011 film), documentary about Swedish film director Roy Andersson
- "Tomorrow's Another Day" (song), 1935 song composed by Glenn Miller for the Dorsey Brothers Orchestra
