= Towards the Sun =

Towards the Sun may refer to:

- Towards the Sun (film), a 1955 documentary film directed by Andrzej Wajda
- Towards the Sun (album), a 2011 album by Alexi Murdoch
- "Towards the Sun" (song), a 2015 song by Rihanna
- "Towards the Sun", a 2024 song by Sia from Reasonable Woman (album)
