= List of films: S–Z =

Separate lists have been created for each letter or new group of letters:

- List of films: S;
- List of films: T;
- List of films: U-V-W;
- List of films: X-Y-Z.
