= Andrzej Wajda filmography =

Filmography

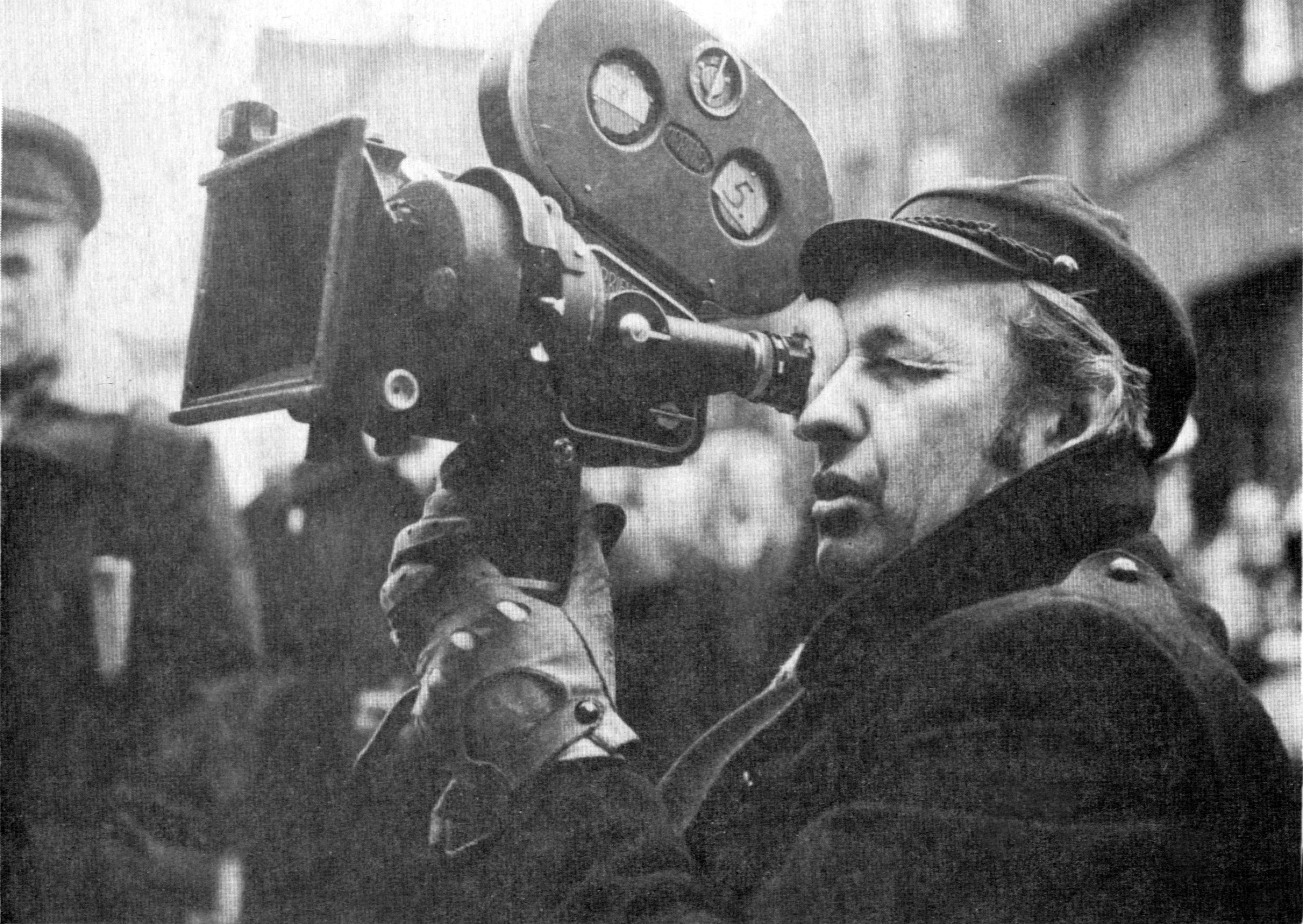
Andrzej Wajda in 1974

Andrzej Wajda (6 March 1926 – 9 October 2016) was a Polish film and theatre director.

== Filmography ==
Wajda directed the following films:

- The Bad Boy (Zły chłopiec, 1951 short film)
- The Pottery at Ilza (Ceramika ilzecka, 1951 short film)
- While you are sleeping (Kiedy ty śpisz, 1953 short film)
- A Generation (Pokolenie, 1955)
- Towards the Sun (Idę do słońca, documentary on Xawery Dunikowski, 1955)
- Kanał (1957)
- Ashes and Diamonds (Popiół i diament 1958)
- Lotna (1959)
- Innocent Sorcerers (Niewinni czarodzieje, 1960)
- Samson (1961)
- Siberian Lady Macbeth (Powiatowa lady Makbet, 1962)
- Love at Twenty (L'amour à vingt ans, 1962)
- The Ashes (Popioly, 1965)
- Roly Poly (Przekładaniec, 1968)
- Gates to Paradise (Bramy Raju, 1968)
- Everything for Sale (Wszystko na sprzedaż, 1969)
- Hunting Flies (Polowanie na muchy, 1969)
- The Birch Wood (Brzezina, 1970)
- Landscape After the Battle (Krajobraz po bitwie, 1970)
- Pilate and Others (Pilatus und andere, 1972)
- The Wedding (Wesele, 1972)
- The Promised Land (Ziemia obiecana, 1975)
- The Shadow Line/Smuga Cienia (Smuga cienia, 1976)
- Man of Marble (Człowiek z marmuru, 1977)
- Without Anesthesia a.k.a. Rough Treatment (Bez znieczulenia, 1978)
- The Maids of Wilko (Panny z Wilka, 1979)
- As years go by, as days go by (Z biegiem lat, z biegiem dni, 1980 TV series)
- The Orchestra Conductor (Dyrygent, 1980)
- Man of Iron (Człowiek z żelaza, 1981)
- Danton (1983)
- A Love in Germany (Eine Liebe in Deutschland, 1983)
- A Chronicle of Amorous Accidents (Kronika wypadków miłosnych, 1986)
- The French as seen by... (segment "Proust contre la déchéance") (1988)
- The Possessed (Les possédes, 1988)
- Korczak (1990)
- The Crowned-Eagle Ring (Pierścionek z orłem w koronie, 1992)
- Nastasja (1994)
- Holy Week (Wielki Tydzień, 1995)
- Miss Nobody (Panna Nikt, 1996)
- Pan Tadeusz (1999)
- Bigda idzie (Bigda idzie!, 1999 TV theatre)
- The Condemnation of Franciszek Klos (Wyrok na Franciszka Kłosa, 2000)
- June night (Noc czerwcowa, 2001 TV theatre)
- Broken Silence (Przerwane milczenie, 2002)
- The Revenge (Zemsta, 2002)
- Man of Hope (Czlowiek z nadziei, 2005 short film)
- Katyń (2007)
- Sweet Rush (Tatarak, 2009)
- Walesa. Man of Hope (Wałęsa. Człowiek z nadziei, 2013)
- Afterimage (2016)
