= Tamaki Matsuoka =

Japanese activist (born 1947)

Tamaki Matsuoka (松岡 環, Matsuoka Tamaki; born 1947 in Osaka, Japan) is a Japanese activist who challenges Japanese perceptions of the country's war crimes in the Rape of Nanjing during Second Sino-Japanese War.

Being a primary school teacher in Matsubara, Osaka teaching history, Matsuoka felt she needed to tell the truth about Japanese war crimes to her students. She visited Nanjing, China several times to interview hundreds of Japanese veterans and Chinese survivors, and published books and films showing their memories after Japan captured Nanjing. Her works include the 2009 documentary Torn Memories of Nanjing.

Matsuoka is a member of the Japan-China Peace Research Organization which attends the memorial ceremony at the Nanjing Massacre Memorial Hall in Nanjing on August 15 every year to show the regrets of Japanese people for the war crimes.

== Threats ==
Matsuoka has been careful not to publicize her address, for her and her family's safety from Japanese nationalist groups, and has hidden her testimonies to protect them from being stolen or destroyed.

== Publications ==
The following are her books, as listed in WorldCat:

- 南京戦・閉ざされた記憶を尋ねて : 元兵士102人の証言./Nankinsen tozasareta kioku o tazunete : motoheishi hyakuninin no shōgen. Tōkyō : Shakai Hyōronsha, 2002. ISBN 9784784505470
  - Chinese translation: 南京战 : 寻找被封闭的记忆 : 侵华日军原士兵102人的证言 = Nanjingzhan : xunzhaobeifengbidejiyi : qinhuarijunyuanshibing102rendezhengyan /

Nanjing zhan : xun zhao bei feng bi de ji yi : qin hua Ri jun yuan shi bing 102 ren de zheng yan = Nanjingzhan : xunzhaobeifengbidejiyi : qinhuarijunyuanshibing102rendezhengyan. Shanghai : Shanghai ci shu chu ban she, 2002.

- 戦場の街南京 : 松村伍長の手紙と程瑞芳日記 / Senjō no machi Nankin : Matsumura Gochō no tegami to Tei Zuihō nikki. Tōkyō : Shakai Hyōronsha, 2009
