= Tejano (film) =

- Directed by: David Blue Garcia
- Written by: Kyle Bogart
- Produced by: David Blue Garcia
- Starring: Patrick Mackie; Roland Uribe; Mayra Leal; Adrian Gonzalez; Emma Perez-Trevino
- Cinematography: David Blue Garcia
- Edited by: Shiraz Jafri
- Music by: Darren Morze
- Release dates: 6 May 2018 (Dallas International Film Festival); 27 September 2018 (US)
- Running time: 90 minutes
- Country: United States
- Languages: English; Spanish

Tejano is a 2018 American thriller film directed by David Blue Garcia, starring Patrick Mackie, Roland Uribe, Mayra Leal, Adrian Gonzalez and Emma Perez-Trevino.

== Plot ==
Javi, a hardworking farmhand in South Texas, is driven to desperation when his elderly grandfather falls gravely ill and mounting medical bills spiral beyond his means. With no other options and time running out, Javi is coerced into making a dangerous arrangement with a local cartel. In a brutal act of desperation, he deliberately fractures his arm so he can conceal cocaine inside the plaster cast—and attempt to smuggle the drugs across the Mexican border.

== Cast ==
- Patrick Mackie as Javi
- Roland Uribe as Arturo
- Mayra Leal as Lorena
- Adrian Gonzalez as Adelio
- Emma Perez-Trevino as Gloria
- Glynn Praesel as Mr. Widmer
- Brian Bogart as Duke Widmer
- Judd Farris as Sunglasses
- Rafael Flores as César
- Daniel J. Castaneda as Salta
- Pedro García as Mexican Border Guard
- Efrain Valdez as Dr. Garcia

== Release ==
The film premiered at the Dallas International Film Festival on 6 May 2018, where it won the Audience Award.

== Reception ==
Chris Salce of Film Threat gave the film a score of 9/10 and wrote that "Everything about this film had me interested from beginning to the very end."

Cary Darling of the Houston Chronicle rated the film 4 stars out of 5 and called it an "entertaining blast of Texas noir that nods toward the work of the Coen brothers, Quentin Tarantino and fellow Austinite Greg Kwedar's 2016 low-budget thriller Transpecos as well as Breaking Bad."

Joe Friar of The Victoria Advocate rated the film 3 stars out of 4 and called it a "riveting film that benefits from cinematographer-turned-director Garcia's keen eye."

Danielle White of The Austin Chronicle rated the film 3 stars out of 5 wrote that it "offers some truly gorgeous scenes."
