= Tit for Tat (1904 film) =

- Directed by: Georges Méliès
- Starring: Georges Méliès
- Production company: Star Film Company
- Release date: 1904
- Country: France
- Language: Silent

Un prêté pour un rendu (une bonne farce avec ma tête), sold in the United States as Tit for Tat, or a Good Joke With My Head and in Britain as "Tit for Tat"—The head in a case, is a 1904 French silent trick film by Georges Méliès. It was sold by Méliès's Star Film Company and is numbered 540–541 in its catalogues.

Méliès plays the magician in the film, one of several in his oeuvre involving multiplied heads. The special effects are created with substitution splices and multiple exposures.

A paper print of the film survives at the Library of Congress.

== Plot ==
A magician enters and looks at himself in a handheld mirror, expressing surprise at his baldness. Pantomiming that he has a solution, he places a comically disheveled wig on his head. Looking in the mirror again, he is displeased by what he sees and throws this wig away. He places a second, more neatly groomed wig on his head, and happily presents himself to the audience after referring to the mirror one last time.

The magician presents a glass box to the audience and sets it on a raised table. Opening the top and standing on a stool, he indicates that he will place his head within the box. Doing so, his headless body then conjures another head from within a top hat and places it on its neck. The magician then closes the box and begins to smoke a cigarette, blowing smoke into the box, much to his amusement and the displeasure of the head inside. The inside of the box grows increasingly smoky, and the head increasingly irritated, until the magician grasps his throat to indicate that the head is choking for want of air. Opening the lid of the box, the magician laughs at the head’s misfortune, not realizing it is floating up and out of its container. While he looks to see where it has gone, the head floats up above the magician. It releases a spout of water from its mouth, wetting the magician’s head and clothes. Enraged, he jumps up and grabs the head, stuffing it into his top hat, striking it repeatedly with his fists, foot, and knee, before leaving quickly with the hat on his head.
