= Tibi and His Mothers =

Tibi and his Mothers is a 2013 documentary film written and directed by Ueli Meier. The production is by Tibifilm. The film is about a Tibetan refugee boy called Tibi Lhundub Tsering who arrives in Switzerland in 1963 to be adopted by a Swiss family.

Tibi was placed with his foster mother Ruth Graber. He travelled back to India in 1976 after completing a course in bricklayering and met his real parents again for the first time after he left the Refugee camp in India in 1962. Tibi developed drug addiction after his family reunion trip in Bylakupee Settlement in India. Tibi married in 1986, and had a son. In 1988, he was jailed in relation to drug issue. His marriage collapses after his release. He married again to his second wife Miriam. Today Tibi works as carer for mentally disabled people in Zurich, Switzerland.

== Controversy ==
This documentary evokes some controversy. Tibi and his Mothers takes a unique view to the situation of Tibetan refugee children in exile and the effect on their lives due to displacement and estrangement from their families in Tibet.
