= Torn Memories of Nanjing =

- Directed by: Tamaki Matsuoka
- Produced by: Tomokazu Takeda
- Release date: 2009
- Running time: 84 minutes
- Country: Japan
- Language: Japanese

Torn Memories of Nanjing (南京 引き裂かれた記憶) is a 2009 Japanese documentary film by Japanese activist Tamaki Matsuoka about the Nanjing Massacre. On March 28, 2010 it was shown at the Hong Kong International Film Festival. It includes interviews with Japanese veterans who admit to raping and killing Chinese civilians, and accounts by Chinese survivors.

== See also ==
- Nanjing massacre
- Japanese war crimes
- Japanese Devils
