= Twilight (1969 film) =

1969 Cambodian film by Norodom Sihanouk

- Directed by: Norodom Sihanouk
- Written by: Norodom Sihanouk
- Produced by: Norodom Sihanouk
- Starring: Norodom Sihanouk; Monique Sihanouk; Dy Saveth
- Narrated by: Norodom Sihanouk
- Music by: Norodom Sihanouk
- Distributed by: Khemara Pictures
- Release date: July 1969
- Running time: 75 minutes
- Country: Cambodia
- Languages: Khmer; French

Twilight (Khmer: សន្ធិប្រកាស, Sânthĭprâkas; French: Crépuscule) is a 1969 Cambodian film composed, written, produced, and directed by Norodom Sihanouk, who also stars in the lead role of Prince Adit.

== Plot ==
This film by Prince Norodom Sihanouk is based on the book Angkor by the famous French archaeologist Bernard Groslier in which he described the beauty of the temples of Angkor. Sihanouk created a triangular love story which has as background the temples of Angkor, with an Indian heroine (Maharani Maya), role played in the film by his wife Princess Monique, who falls in love with a Khmer prince (Prince Adit).

== Cast ==
- Norodom Sihanouk as Prince Adit
- Monique Sihanouk as Maharani Maya
- Kong Sam Oeurn as Rudolf Valentino
- Kishin Relwani as Ambassodor
- Dy Saveth as Sopheap
- Visakha Tioulong as Madame Visakha
- Som Sam Al

== Reception ==
The film won the Golden Apsara Award at the 1969 Phnom Penh International Film Festival.

It was screened at several festivals internationally, including the 4th International Film Festival of India.

== See also ==
- Angkor
