= Titanic Love =

- Directed by: Mark Pressdee
- Produced by: Mark Pressdee
- Starring: Alex Edwardson, Susannah Felicty Wells, Loxley Loga, Ryan Mcken
- Music by: Mark Lynall
- Release date: 14 April 2012
- Running time: 23 minutes
- Country: United Kingdom
- Language: English

Titanic Love is a British romantic comedy short film directed by Mark Pressdee. It was filmed in and around Birmingham city centre.

== Cast ==
- Alex Edwardson – Jack Doe
- Susannah Felicty Wells – Lucy Tupper
- Loxley Loga – Delroy Jones
- Ryan Mcken – Jazz Doff

== Filming ==
In October 2011 a cast and crew of about 30 people collaborated to produce the film. The film was shot in various historical and local areas of Birmingham, UK. Titanic Love went into post-production at the University of Birmingham in November 2011.

A preliminary version was produced and shown at the Stoke Your Fires Festival on Valentine's Day 2012. After additional editing, the film was sent to Los Angeles, where the music was produced by Mark Lynall.

The film was then continually shown throughout the summer of 2012 in places such as The Mac in Birmingham.

== Awards and nominations ==
- In October 2012 Titanic love was nominated and later won in The Best Short 2012 category at the MVSA Awards at the Black International Film Festival.
- One month later the film was nominated for the LA Comedy Kick Ass Awards and was screened in Hollywood. Here it won its second award: Best Screenplay 2012.
- Winner of Best of Block in the Kontrast Film Festival in Germany
- Winner of Award of Excellence at The Indie Fest in Los Angeles
- Winner of Award of Excellence in the Accolade Film Competition in Los Angeles
- Winner of Best Romantic Comedy at the Shärt International Comedy Film Festival in Canada
- Winner of Award of Merit for Best Short in the Best Shorts Competition in Los Angeles
- Winner of Award of Merit for Direction in the Best Shorts in Los Angeles
- Winner of the Life Tree Film Award at the Life Tree Film Festival in Colorado
- Honourable Mention at the Los Angeles Movie Awards in Los Angeles
- Winner of the Audience Choice Award in Australia
