= Taintlight =

- Directed by: Chris Seaver
- Written by: Chris Seaver
- Produced by: Joe Fiorello; Rachel Lovinger; Scott Milletics; Chris Seaver; Tim Violent
- Starring: Meredith Host; Kurt Indovina; A.J. Stabbone
- Music by: Kyle Pittman
- Distributed by: Low Budget Pictures
- Release date: November 17, 2009
- Running time: 60 minutes
- Country: United States
- Language: English

Taintlight is a 2009 American direct-to-video parody horror film, written and directed by Chris Seaver and starring Meredith Host, Kurt Indovina, and A.J. Stabbone. It is a parody of the 2008 film Twilight.

The film belongs to the paranormal romance genre, depicting a love triangle between a female human, a male vampire, and a male werewolf.

== Premise ==
When lovely young Stella (Meredith Host) strikes up a romance with pale, brooding vampire Edgar Mullens (Kurt Indovina), the couple must navigate the treacherous waters of human-undead love and fend off the amorous advances of a werewolf named Jack (A.J. Stabbone). Meanwhile, another brood of bloodsuckers seeks to impale Edgar and claim Stella for themselves.

== Cast ==
- Meredith Host as Stella
- Kurt Indovina as Edgar Mullens
- A.J. Stabbone as Jack
- Jesse Green as Razor
- Jesse Ames as Veronica
- Miranda Bonetwig as Rosalis
- Billy Garberina as Tobius / Raoul
- Andrew Baltes as Rathbone / Mime
- Chris Seaver as Jock de Queaf
- Jessica Stephens as Jessey
- Jason McCall as T-Bone

== Home media ==
Taintlight was released directly to DVD on November 17, 2009 by Tempe Video's horror spoof label Splatter Rampage.

== Reception ==
Critical reception has been predominantly negative. heavy.com panned the film, writing that it "is not the worst movie I’ve ever seen, but that’s only because it’s 30 minutes shorter than Sorority Girls’ Revenge, and when you get to a certain level of awfulness, it only matters how long it lasts." The Washington Post also wrote a brief, negative review of the film where they remarked that Taintlight was "a "Twilight" spoof that was too sorry for even a single review on RottenTomatoes.com." In his book Fervid Filmmaking, Mike Watt wrote that the lead actors' impressions of Kristen Stewart and Robert Pattinson were "dead on".
