= Tabi wa Kimagure Kaze Makase =

- Directed by: Katsuhiko Tasaka
- Screenplay by: Hideo Oguni
- Produced by: Sakai
- Starring: Raizo Ichikawa; Yōko Uraji; Jun Negami; Tokiko Mita
- Cinematography: Chikichiro Takeda
- Music by: Taichiro Kosugi
- Backgrounds by: Akira Naitō
- Color process: black-and-white
- Production company: Daiei Film
- Distributed by: Daiei Film
- Release date: April 16, 1958
- Running time: 79 minutes
- Country: Japan
- Language: Japanese

Tabi wa Kimagure Kaze Makase (旅は気まぐれ風まかせ, Tabi wa Kimagure Kaze Makase; lit. 'Leave the Journey to the Whimsical Wind') is a 1958 black-and-white Japanese film directed by Katsuhiko Tasaka.

== Plot ==
A traveler named Genta asked me to catch Miyoshi Mujuku Miyoshi and make him a younger brother. He was good at magic tricks. That night, at the house of Nibei in Oiwake-shuku, where I stayed, I immediately paid money using magic tricks and had him buy sake. Nibei was old and sympathized with the deserted family. The daughter, Okin, supported her house in the guise of a man, trying to keep her brother Taroyoshi strong. --Eigoro Omaeda left home to give his brother a trace, and Inui and his friends were looking for him.

At the request of Miyoshi, Genta boarded the gambling house where Nibei's former Inui was entrusted with the emerging boss Bon Goza called Senemon, a wholesale store. With his magic trick, he got rid of money and came back. Genta, who was struck by Miyoshi again, boarded the inn where they were gathering for the revenge. When they tried to slash, Genta immediately impersonated Eigoro and withdrew triumphantly. Everyone was disappointed. Daigoro of the law seal also came to greet me. Silk became more and more fond of him. --- That night, Genta and Miyoshi tried to escape at night. However, the shape of the Senemon is in the soil. When the silk noticed and rushed to the riverbank with Nibei and others, Genta was helped by Sanji and was fighting against Senemon and others. Eigoro's Inui-Ban-nabe Seiroku and others who received the news from Daigoro also helped, and the villain was destroyed.

Miyoshi was --- Eigoro. With Genta-the breath of the samurai, he was running away from home for the same reason. In front of the calling silk and his younger brother, Genta made a major product of the first generation. He disappeared somewhere, leaving the cap and the feathers in a humanoid shape.

== Cast ==
- Raizo Ichikawa
- Yōko Uraji
- Jun Negami
- Tokiko Mita
