= Tommy Atkins in the Park =

1898 film by Robert W. Paul

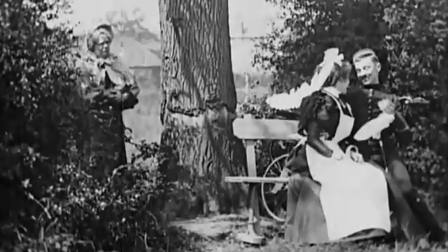
- Screenshot from the film
- Directed by: Robert W. Paul
- Produced by: Robert W. Paul
- Cinematography: Robert W. Paul
- Production company: Paul's Animatograph Works
- Release date: August 1898
- Running time: 47 secs
- Country: United Kingdom
- Language: Silent

Tommy Atkins in the Park is an 1898 British short black-and-white silent comedy film, directed by Robert W. Paul, featuring a couple courting in a park who are forced to use desperate measures to get rid of a stout matron who interrupts them. The film was a remake of Alfred Moul's The Soldier's Courtship (1896). It is included on the BFI DVD R.W. Paul: The Collected Films 1895-1908 and a clip is featured in Paul Merton's interactive guide to early British silent comedy How They Laughed on the BFI website.
