= Tokiori – Dobras do Tempo =

2013 film directed by Paulo Pastorelo

- Theatrical release poster
- Directed by: Paulo Pastorelo
- Written by: Kentaro Sugao; Noriko Oda; Paulo Pastorelo
- Produced by: Matias Mariani and Paulo Pastorelo
- Music by: Ivan Vilela
- Distributed by: Lume Filmes; Primo Fimes
- Release date: 22 November 2013
- Running time: 110 minutes
- Country: Brazil
- Languages: Portuguese; Japanese

Tokiori – Dobras do Tempo is a 2013 Brazilian documentary film directed by Paulo Pastorelo. The film follows the memory of five families of Japanese immigrants who settled in Brazil in the 1930s.

== Synopsis ==
The destinies of five families of Japanese immigrants crossed, between 1927 and 1934, in the rural neighborhood of Graminha, 45 km of Marília, São Paulo. The film follows the journey of memories of three generations of these families, creating a mosaic of different experiences. Contributions of this community still designs the reality of São Paulo and Brazil.
