= The Tunnel (2009 film) =

- Directed by: Jenna Bass
- Screenplay by: Jenna Bass
- Produced by: Fox Fire Films
- Starring: Sibulele Mlumbi Finch Moyo Patricia Matongo Vuyisile Pandle Pakamisa Zwedala
- Cinematography: Jacques Koudstaal
- Edited by: Jacques de Villiers
- Music by: John Turest-Swartz
- Release date: 2009
- Running time: 25'
- Country: South Africa

The Tunnel is a 2009 film directed by Jenna Bass.

== Synopsis ==
Set in Matabeleland during the 80s, The Tunnel follows young Elizabeth, who loves inventing tall tales. When she arrives at a guerrilla camp desperate for help, Elizabeth must tell her greatest story of all, a story about her village, strangers, ghosts, the day her father dug a tunnel to the city and her journey to find him. As the story unfolds, Elizabeth embarks on a quest for truth, weaving together fact and illusion. But reality is not far behind and, to save her village, Elizabeth will have to confront it.
