= A Toothy Smile =

- Directed by: Roman Polanski
- Written by: Roman Polanski
- Starring: Nikola Todorow
- Cinematography: Henryk Kucharski
- Release date: 1957
- Running time: 2 mins.
- Country: Poland

A Toothy Smile (Polish: Uśmiech zębiczny) is a 1957 Polish short film written and directed by Roman Polanski. A man walks down the exterior staircase of some building, He passes a small window. He looks in, and there a young woman standing at a washbasin, drying her hair with a towel that covers her face. The man is interrupted by a door opening, the occupant begins bringing out empty bottles. The man starts down the stairs, only to return to the window after the door has closed. He again looks in the window and is surprised.

In his autobiography, Roman Polanski says that the theme was set for him by a supervisor at film school.
