= Tamarind Juice (film) =

- Theatrical release poster
- Directed by: Julio Andrade
- Written by: Julio Andrade
- Produced by: Julio Andrade
- Starring: Karen Dejo; Leslie Stewart; Gerardo Zamora
- Production company: Star Films
- Distributed by: Star Films
- Release date: 24 January 2019
- Running time: 94 minutes
- Country: Peru
- Language: Spanish

Tamarind Juice (Spanish: Jugo de tamarindo) is a 2019 Peruvian sexploitation comedy film written, directed, produced and co-starred by Julio Andrade in his directorial debut. Starring Karen Dejo, Leslie Stewart and Gerardo Zamora, it is based on the homonymous video clip by Julio Andrade.

== Synopsis ==
Jugo de tamarindo focuses on a musician with domestic and marital problems. Until, in the middle of the tour, he meets a dancer with a traumatic past and with whom he made a successful video clip some time ago.

== Cast ==
The actors participating in this film are:

- Julio Andrade as Samy
- Karen Dejo as Morocha Elsa
- Leslie Stewart as Gloria
- Gerardo Zamora as Lucho
- Carolina Alvarez as Katrina
- Américo Zúñiga as Roberto
- Nicolás Fantinato
- Gustavo Cerrón
- Carlos Barraza
- Kukuli Morante
- Patsy Bendayán as China Ximena
- Renato Pantigozo as Rengifo
- Alonso Cano as Percy

== Production ==
On 9 September 2015 the making of a film based on his video clip Jugo de tamarindo was announced. Principal photography began in May 2016.

== Release ==
Tamarind Juice was scheduled to be released on 10 January 2019 in Peruvian theaters, but ended up being released on 24 January the same year.

== Reception ==
In its opening weekend it attracted 1,200 moviegoers, being surpassed by the re-release of Schindler's List.
