= Taxi Beirut =

- Directed by: Hadi Zaccak
- Written by: Hady Zaccak
- Produced by: Issam Dakroub
- Starring: Fadi; Fouad; Amal
- Cinematography: Muriel Aboulrouss
- Edited by: Elias Shaheen
- Music by: Emile Aouad
- Production company: Al Jazeera Documentary Channel
- Distributed by: NewsTime Production
- Release date: October 8, 2011
- Running time: 51 minutes
- Country: Lebanon
- Language: Arabic (with English Subtitles)

Taxi Beirut is a documentary film directed by Hady Zaccak, produced by Issam Dakroub that stars three average taxi drivers. It was released on October 8, 2011 BIFF, the Beirut International Film Festival. It was produced by the Al-Jazeera documentary channel. The movie follows a day in the life of three Lebanese taxi drivers working in the metropolitan city of Beirut. It features the taxis going around the Beirut area, picking up tourists and locals alike. The three taxi drivers are Beirut residents of different religious and cultural backgrounds and give the viewers a picture of the pros and cons of Lebanon's diverse population. The movie includes Arabic, English and French dialogue. The movie has a 51-minute running time and is still circulating film festivals across Europe and the Middle East.

== Plot ==
As with any documentary film, this is the first structural scenario, which leads the film Taxi Beirut. Taxi Beirut focuses upon three generations of Beirut cab drivers, all quite unlike one another apart from their chosen profession. Show through the drivers and their news and their positions in Beirut image dimensions of social, historical, political and cultural rights. Movie reviews day in the life of the city alternating drivers on the submission and vary the role of each one of them and its importance as if each one sheds light on one side of life in Beirut film remains the most prominent city in which personal. They interact with the events, this combination on the ground so as to maintain the approach blends aspects of comic and popular with the touch of poetic and critical dimension and satirical cinema in the context of surveillance. It shows the history of Beirut, from pre-Arabization to the civil war era. The post-civil war Lebanon is depicted as a promising future hub for the Middle East as a tourist attraction that features high-end nightlife, historical sites and beautiful scenery. It shows the different areas of Beirut and how there are minorities are often segregated by ethnicity and religion. Drivers share their opinions about culture, the past and future of the country, jokes and anecdotes about the country. The three taxi drivers are of different respective backgrounds, showing how diverse Lebanon is. One driver is a former Christian militant, one is a Shiite Muslim from Dahia in southern Beirut, the other is a Palestinian refugee. Every aspect of Lebanon is shown, from the undertones of racial tension amongst the Lebanese and Palestinian and Armenian refugees. At the same time they give examples of unity amongst the people and the promising future of Beirut as a cultural center for the Middle East.

== Location ==
The film was shot on location in Beirut henceforth the name Taxi Beirut. Every taxi driver was working in circulated different areas of Beirut, accentuating the segregation of the certain quarters of Beirut. The Christian driver drove through parts of Achrafieh and Saifi. The Shiite driver drove through mostly Shiite neighborhoods and the Palestinian driver routed throughout Beirut from the very diverse undivided parts of Ras Beirut to the South around the Shatila and Mar Elias Palestinian refugee camps. The movie features well-known parts of Beirut like Pigeon Rock and gives a unique overview of all aspects and sectors of the city.

== Cast ==
- Amal as himself
- Fouad as himself
- Fadi as himself

== Casting crew ==
- Cinematographer: Muriel Aboulrouss
- Sound: Mouhab Shanesaz
- Assistant camera & lighting:Jihad Salloum
- Editing: Elias Shaheen
- Music and Sound design: Emile Aouad
- Assistant Director: Mohamad Hamdar
- Executive Producer: Issam Dakroub (News Time Productions)
- Production: Al Jazeera Documentary Channel
- Written and Directed by: Hady Zaccak
