= To Shoot an Elephant =

- Directed by: Alberto Arce; Mohammad Rujailah
- Produced by: Adam Redgrove
- Release date: November 20, 2009 (Stockholm Film Festival)
- Running time: 112 minutes
- Country: Spain
- Languages: English; Arabic

To Shoot an Elephant teaser in English with Basque language subtitles.

To Shoot an Elephant is a 2009 documentary film about the 2008-2009 Gaza War directed by Alberto Arce and Mohammad Rujailahk. The two directors were two of the few foreign journalists present during the 2008 Gaza Massacre. The film follows ambulance personnel in the Gaza Strip during the conflict and was shown at multiple international film festivals, winning awards such as the FIPRESCI Prize at the Thessaloniki International Film Festival and the Most Innovative Filmmaker prize at the Festival dei Popoli in Florence.

== Synopsis ==
To Shoot an Elephant is an "eye witness account" of the Gaza Strip from December 2008 to January 2009 during Operation Cast Lead, otherwise known as the First Gaza War and the Gaza Massacre. Director Alberto Arce was filming in Gaza in late 2008 as a member of the International Solidarity movement. As a result, he was one of the few foreign journalists present inside the strip when the conflict broke out, as Israeli forces banned foreign journalists from entering the area.

The film is focused on the ambulance personnel in the Gaza Strip during that time period. Specifically, it filmed how medical teams and hospitals were targeted by Israeli forces.

== Production ==
The title was named after George Orwell's 1936 essay Shooting an Elephant.

The film was directed by Alberto Arce and Mohammad Rujailahk. The script was written by Alberto Arce and Miquel Martí Freixas, who also edited the film. Post-production was done by Jorge Fernández Mayoral and sound was designed by Francesc Gosalves. It was a co-production of Gazan Days and Eguzki Bideoak

Arce and Rujailah filmed the documentary with one camera – a Handycam. Filming began on December 25, 2008.

== Release ==
To Shoot an Elephant was released under a Creative Commons Attribution Non Commercial Share Alike 2.5 license and distributed by Eguzki Bideoak in Spain. It was screened at the Stockholm Film Festival on November 20, 2009.

The film was selected to be screened at more than two dozen film festivals. Other notable screenings included the Dubai International Film Festival, the Reykjavik International Film Festival, the Thessaloniki International Film Festival, the International Documentary Film Festival Amsterdam, the Gijón International Film Festival, and the Addis International Film Festival.

The team behind the film organized a global screening of the film for the film on January 18, 2010, for the first anniversary of the end of the bombing.

== Critical reception ==
A 2009 review on The Culturist described the documentary as "hard hitting and moving." Jurists at the Festival dei Popoli said of the film, "After we watched this film we engaged in a long passionate discussion. This film never left us. We want to award the filmmakers for sharing with us an emotional, physical and stressful experience for being there and witnessing the horrors and destruction of the siege imposed on the Gaza Strip earlier this year."

Arce won the Best Director / Most Innovative Filmmaker prize at the Festival dei Popoli in Florence in November 2009. In 2010, the film was awarded the A Matter of ACT Documentary Award by the Movies that Matter Festival, the FIPRESCI Prize at the Thessaloniki International Film Festival, and the RED-Vectracom Award at the Cinéma du Réel festival.
