= Tomorrow's Another Day (2011 film) =

Tomorrow's Another Day (Swedish: Det är en dag imorgon också) is a 2011 documentary about Swedish film director Roy Andersson and his unique way of making films. Shot during the four-year-long filming Andersson's 2007 film You, the Living, the documentary is a personal description of a surprising and different approach to the creative process. Roy Andersson has invented a working method of his own in order to achieve control over the work in process, but he is ultimately dependent on his young co-workers.

The film was released in April 2011. A shorter version of the film has been shown at the Museum of Modern Art, in New York United States of America.
