= Towards the Sun (film) =

- Directed by: Andrzej Wajda
- Release date: 1955
- Running time: 13 minutes
- Country: Poland
- Language: Polish

Towards the Sun (Polish: Idę do słońca) a 1955 Polish documentary film directed by Andrzej Wajda. The film is about Xawery Dunikowski, a Polish sculptor who survived Auschwitz concentration camp.
