= List of Odia films of the 1970s =

A list of films produced by the Ollywood film industry based in Bhubaneswar and Cuttack in the 1970s:

Title	Director	Cast	Genre	Notes
1970
1971
Sansara	Gaur Ghosh, Parbati Ghosh	Gaur Ghosh, Chapala		
1972
1973
Dharitri	Nitai Palit	Shriram Panda, Prashanta Nanda, Dhir Biswal, Sandhya		
Ghara Sansara	Byomokesh Tripathy, Gopal Ghosh	Sarat Pujari, Prashanta Nanda, Sujata		
1974
Mana Akasha	Nitai Palit	Shriram Panda, Tripura Misra, Shanti Swaroop		
Kanakalata	Ghanashyam Mahapatra	Harish, Sujata		based on Nandakishore Bal's novel Kanakalata
1975
Mamata	Byomokesh Tripathy	Prashanta Nanda, Sujata, Suresh		
Samaya	Ganesh Mahapatra	Prashanta Nanda, Tripura Misra, Shriram Panda		First Oriya movie partially in color
Jajabara	Trimurty	Shriram Panda, Banaja Mohanty,Hemanta Das		
1976
Krushna Sudama	Nitai Palit	Gobinda Tej, Tripura Misra, Anita Das		
Bali Ghara	Abhiyatrik	Sadhu Meher, Prashanta Nanda, Preeti		
Gapa Hele Bi Sata	Nageen Roy	Harish, Banaja Mohanty		First Oriya Color Movie
Sindura Bindu	Sisir Misra	Shriram Panda, Prashanta Nanda, Tripura Misra		
Sesha Shrabana	Prashanta Nanda	Prashanta Nanda, Mahasweta Roy, Hemanta Das		
Hira Moti Manika	J. Adeni	Prashanta Nanda, Mahasweta Roy, Dhira Biswal		
1977
Anuraga	J. Adam	Suresh, Saudamini		
Amar Prem	Gopal Gosh	Suresh, Banaja Mohanty Hemanta Das, Natabar Sena		
Punarmilan	K. H. D. Rao	Chakrapani, Rosa		
Mukti	Byomokesh Tripathy	Sujata, Tribhubhan, Deepa Sahu		
Abhiman	Sadhu Meher	Uttam Mohanty, Sarat Pujari, Rita, Babi		Debut film of Uttam mohanty
Bandhu Mahanty	Nitai Palit	Gobinda Tej, Banaja Mohanty, Anita Das		
Ae Nuhen Kahani	K. H. D. Rao	Chakrapani, Mahasweta Roy		
Rakta Golap	Bhimeswar Rao	Suresh, Banaja Mohanty		
Naga Phasa	Basant Nayak	Shriram Panda, Prashanta Nanda, Banaja Mohanty, Jai, Nari, Bijay Mohanty		
Suna Sansar	Sisir Misra	Babi, Sujata Nanda, Niharika		
Chilika Teerey	Biplab Roy Choudhary	Bijay Mohanty, Tandra Roy		
Ahuti		Niharika Sahu		
1978
Topoi	Sarat Pujari	Prashanta Nanda, Krushna Prava		
Pipasha	Devi Das	Ajit Das, Tandra Roy		
Saakhi Gopinath	Ganesh Mahapatra	Pradeep, Mala Bose, Padma Khanna		
Priyatama	Biswajeet Das	Shriram Panda, Mahasweta Roy		
Samarpana	Prafulla Rath/N. Gopal	Sarat Pujari, Tandra Roy		
Kula Chandrama	K. H. D. Rao	Chakrapani, Anita Das		
Parivar	K. H. D. Rao	Chakrapani, Niharika		
Jhilmil	K. H. D. Rao	Shriram Panda, Mahasweta Roy,Luna mohapatra		
Janmadata	K. H. D. Rao	Shriram Panda, Mahasweta Roy		
Pati Patni	M. S. K. Reddy	Sarat Pujari, Uttam Mohanty Roja Ramani		
Sati Anusaya	A. Sanjeevi	Chakrapani, Narendra Mishra Mahasweta Roy		
Kabi Samrat Upendra Bhanja	R. G. Gop	Sarat Pujari, Uttam Mohanty Mahasweta Roy		
Sankha Mahuri	Akshaya Mohanty	Shriram Panda, Uttam Mohanty, Mahasweta Roy		
Gauri	Dhir Biswal	Prashanta Nanda, Ajit Das Mahasweta Roy		
Suna Sansar	Sisir Misra	Sriram Panda		
1979
Balidan	Prashanta Nanda	Prashanta Nanda, Sujata Mahasweta Roy		
Nijhum Rati Ra Saathi	Biswajit Das	Uttam Mohanty, Mahasweta Roy		
Sautuni	Akshaya Mohanty	Bijay Mohanty, Tandra Roy, Anita Das		
Samar Salim Saimon	Sailaja Nanda	Sujata, Anita Das		
Nila Madhab	J. P. Bhagat	Pratihari, Mamata		
SriKrushna Raas Leela	Sona Mukherjee	Rabindra, Tapati, Priti		
Sri Jagannath	Bijay Bhaskar	Chakrapani, Meenushree, Jharana Das		
Chinha Achinha	Kumar Anand	Uttam Mohanty, Mahasweta Roy, Sujata		
Mathua Vijay	A. Sanjeevi	Shrikant, Anita Das, Rupalekha		
Anuraga	Nitai Palit	Arun Misra, Biren Mohanty, Malavika Roy		
