= List of Odia films of 1977 =

This is a list of films produced by the Ollywood film industry based in Bhubaneshwar and Cuttack in 1977:

== A-Z ==
Title	Director	Cast	Genre	Notes
1977
Aahuti	Devi Das	Ajit Das, Nari, Niharika Sahu		
Abhiman	Sadhu Meher	Uttam Mohanty, Sarat Pujari, Rita, Babi		Debut film of Uttam Mohanty
Ae Nuhen Kahani	K.H.D. Rao	Chakrapani, Mahasweta Roy		
Anutap	J. Adeni	Suresh Mahapatra, Preeti, Sahu Samuel		
Bandhu Mohanty	Nitai Palit	Gobinda Tej, Banaja Mohanty, Anita Das		
Chilika Teerey	Biplab Roy Choudhary	Bijay Mohanty, Tandra Roy		
Naga Phasa	Basant Nayak	Shriram Panda, Prashanta Nanda, Banaja Mohanty, Nari, Bijay Mohanty		
Punarmilan	K.H.D. Rao	Chakrapani, Roja Ramani		
Rakta Golapa	Bhimeswar Rao	Suresh, Banaja Mohanty		
Sandhya Tara	Gopal Gosh	Ajit Das, Hemanta Das, Jaya Swami		
Suna Sansar	Sisir Misra	Sriram Panda, Niharika Sahu, Babi, Sujata Nanda, Niharika		
