= List of Odia films of 1965 =

This is a list of films produced by the Ollywood film industry based in Bhubaneshwar and Cuttack in 1965:

== A-Z ==
| Title | Director | Cast | Genre | Notes |
|---|---|---|---|---|
1965
| Abhinetri | Amar Ganguly | Umakant, Jharana Das | | |
| Bhagya | Amar Ganguly | Gaur Ghosh | | |
| Kaa | Siddharth | Gaur Ghosh, Parbati Ghose | | |
| Malajahna | Nitai Palit | Akshya Mohanty, Jharana Das | | |
| Naba Janma | Sachin Mukherjee | Sarat Pujari, Jharana Das | | |
