= Kie Kahara =

- Directed by: Nitai Palit
- Written by: Nitai Palit; Gopal Chotrai; Bhim Singh
- Produced by: Dhira Biswal
- Starring: Sarat Pujari; Saudamini Misra; Dhira Biswal; Lila Dulali
- Cinematography: Dinen Gupta
- Edited by: Ramesh Joshi
- Music by: Akshaya Mohanty
- Production company: Pancha Sakha Films
- Release date: 12 June 1968
- Running time: 178 min
- Country: India
- Language: Odia

Kie Kahara (1968) is an Odia film directed by Nitai Palit. The film reflects the socio-economic conflicts of the declining Zamindar families, which were struggling to keep up social status with great difficulty.

== Synopsis ==
Prakash's father leaves him after his wife's death and gives Prakash's custody to his sister Mamata. Mamata gives a good education to Prakash and he becomes an engineer. Prakash gets a job in town, In the town, he meets Rajendra Samantrai's family and stays in their home as tenant. Rajendra Samantrai's forefathers are Zamindars. Rajendra struggles enough to fulfill the demands of his wife and her status. in the meanwhile, Rajendra's daughter Malati falls in love with Prakash. Rajendra accepts their love, but Subhadra prefers Nagen, who is the son of a wealthy contractor Nabin Mahapatra over Prakash. Subhadra believes Nagen's wealth can help them maintain their status. When Nagen comes with an offer for his marriage with Malati, Rajendra flatly denies this. The offended Nagen tries to disrupt Rajendra's family. Also Nagen successfully creates confusion between Prakash and Malati. Prakash's father arrives the scene and ends all confusion. At last Prakash and Malati get married.

== Cast ==
- Sarat Pujari — Parakash
- Saudamini Misra — Malati
- Samuel Sahu — Rajendra Samantrai
- Lila Dulali — Subhadra
- Dhira Biswal — Nagen Mahapatra
- Ramchandra Pratihari — Nabin Mahapatra
- Bhanumati Devi — Mamata
- Sagar Das — Ashok
- Shyamalendu Bhattacharjee — Servant
- Niranjan Satapathy — Kartik
- Narendra Behera — Prakash's friend
- Bimal Choudhury — Prakash's father
- Geetarani
- Saraswati
- Pira Misra
- Bhim Singh

== Soundtrack ==
The music for the film was composed by Akshaya Mohanty.

Song	Lyrics	Singer(s)
"Chakori Jharana Luha"	Akshaya Mohanty	Akshaya Mohanty
"Hai Madabhari Aakh"	Partha Sarathi Mohapatra	Shyamal Mitra
"Hema Harini Mathara Mani"	Kali Charan Patnaik	Nirmala Mishra, Shipra Bose
"Udasi Aakhi Chanhi Rahe"	Narayan Prasad Singh	Arati Mukherjee, Ramola
"Udi Udi Udi Jaare Udi"	Akshaya Mohanty	Akshaya Mohanty
"Phulei Rani Saja Phula"	Debdas Chotrai	Akshaya Mohanty, Sipra Bose
"Paradesi Bandhu Tume"	Debdas Chotrai	Sipra Bose
"Akhi Nuhen Se Je"		

== Box office ==
The film created a sensation and ran to packed houses for about five months in Cuttack city only. It was the first Oriya film to run more than 100 days at several theaters. The film became a box office hit.
