= Adina Megha =

1970 film directed by Amit Maitra

- Directed by: Amit Maitra
- Written by: Gopal Chotrai
- Produced by: Babulal Doshi
- Starring: Prashanta Nanda; Jharana Das; Dukhiram Swain; Samuel Sahoo
- Cinematography: Sailaja Chatterjee
- Music by: Balakrushna Das
- Production company: Chhayabani Pratisthan
- Release date: 1970
- Running time: 154 minutes
- Country: India
- Language: Odia

Adina Megha (English: The Unwanted Cloud) is a 1970 Odia film directed by Amit Maitra.

== Cast ==
- Prashanta Nanda – Suresh Mahapatra
- Jharana Das – Champak Das
- Sandhya as Urmi Das
- Samuel Sahu as Nari Mahapatra
- Bhanumati Devi as Bina Mahapatra
- Dukhiram Swain as Major Das
- Niranjan Sathpathy as Jayakant
- Geeta Rao as Alka Das
- Sagar Das as Sagar Das
- Janaki as Anant Mohanty
- Padma
- Rama
- Kalyan Ghosh as Madan Mishra
- Bhabani as Abhadhan
- Prabhas
- Tapas
- Ajay as Sundar Das
- Shyamalendu Bhattacharya as Sadhu
- Tarakant
- Himanshu as Sudhir Senapati
- Alekh
- Brundaban
- Bijay

== Songs ==
Song	Lyrics	Singer(s)
"Alapa Hasare"	Narayan Prasad Singh	Akshaya Mohanty & Md. Sikandar Alam
"Ei Bhara Janha Rati"	Kabichandra Kalicharan Pattanaik	Akshaya Mohanty & Nirmala Mishra
"Jochhana Luchana"		Nirmala Mishra
"Gele Gele Gele Gori Mar Chhuri"	Narayan Prasad Singh	Akshaya Mohanty & Shipra Bose
"Jibane Sapana Jete"		Balakrushna Dash
"Ei Amari Gaan"		Nirmala Mishra
"Bou Lo Ki Kahibi"		Trupti Das
