= Mohammad Mohsin =

Indian actor

Mohammed Mohsin
- Born: 14 September 1942; Cuttack, Orissa, British India
- Died: 3 January 2003 (aged 60); Cuttack, Odisha, India
- Resting place: Qadam e Rasool, Cuttack
- Education: Sayeed Seminary High School, Cuttack
- Occupations: Director, Producer and actor
- Spouse: Kausra Khatun
- Parent(s): Mohammad Ayub (Father), Amina Bibi (Mother)

Mohammad Mohsin called popularly as Mohsin was an Indian actor, director and producer. In his movie career spanning more than 30 years across Bollywood, Odisha and West Bengal, he has acted and directed in many commercially successful movies. Mohsin started a revolution in commercial Odia movies and connected with the pulse of his audience. His movies ranged from social drama to action packed crime thrillers. Mohsin made his first Bollywood debut in the movie Naiyya, in which he played the character of Karim. Naiyya was produced and distributed by Rajshri Productions, which was a remake of Odia movie Shesha Shrabana, in which Mohsin played the character of a boat maker.

After working for a couple of years in Bollywood, Mohsin stepped in the acting scene of Odia film industry. In his initial days as an actor some of the characters which made Mohsin a favourite amongst movie goers were Bagha in Hisab Nikas, Raka in Maa-o-Mamata (1980), Mohsin played a school teacher who turns into a social reformist in the movie Balidan (1978). Mohsin's first directorial debut was with Odia movie, Phula Chandana (1982). Mohsin won Odisha State Film Awards for Best Director Best Director in the year 1982 for Phula Chandana.

== Early life and background ==
Mohammad Mohsin was born in Cuttack, his schooling was in Sayeed Seminary High School, Cuttack, and completed his Bachelor in Arts from Ravenshaw College, Cuttack. Mohsin's passion for arts and drama caught him early from college and he contested and was elected as secretary of the Dramatic Society of Ravenshaw College. He continued his passion towards drama and theatre by performing in Annapurna Theatre, Cuttack. Mohsin continued his contribution to the Odia film industry by joining hands with Prashanta Nanda as an associate director. From there, Mohsin in the Odia film industry was marked in the field of acting, direction, story, screenplay, dialogue and as a producer. Mohsin has acted in more than 14 movies, and directed in 16 movies. Mohsin's most notable movies were Phoola Chandana (1982), Danda Balunga (1980), Jaga Hatare Pagha (1985), Sahari Bagha (1985), Laxman Rekha (1996), and Santana (1998).

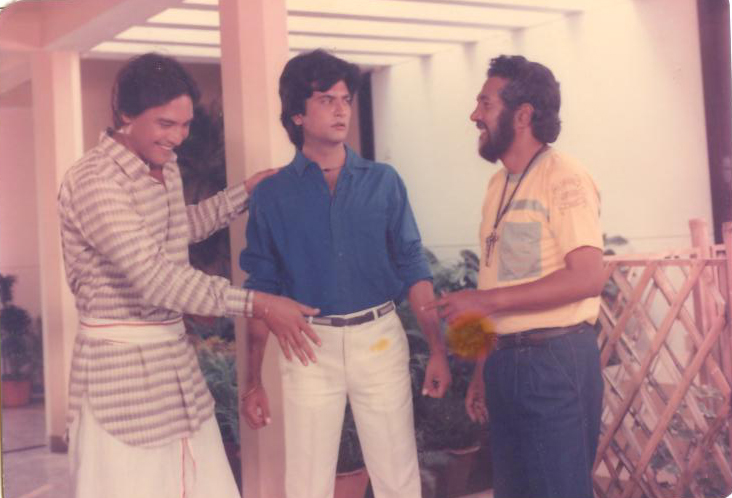
Mohsin as Anthony in Mamata ra Dori

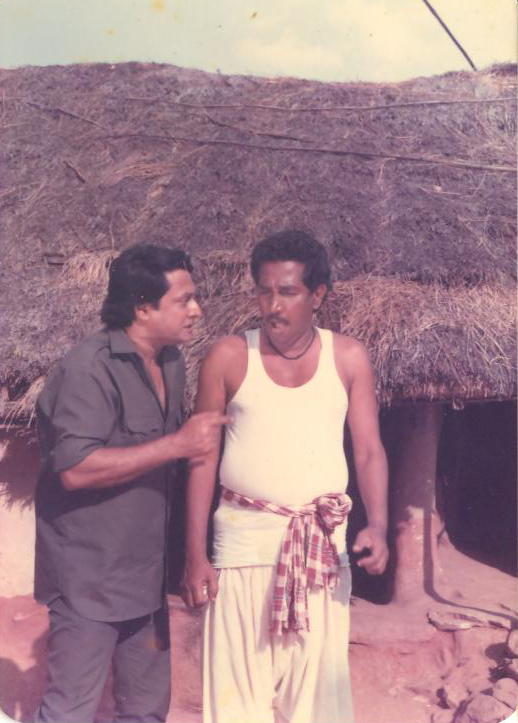
Mohammad Mohsin as Nitei in Bidhir Bidhan

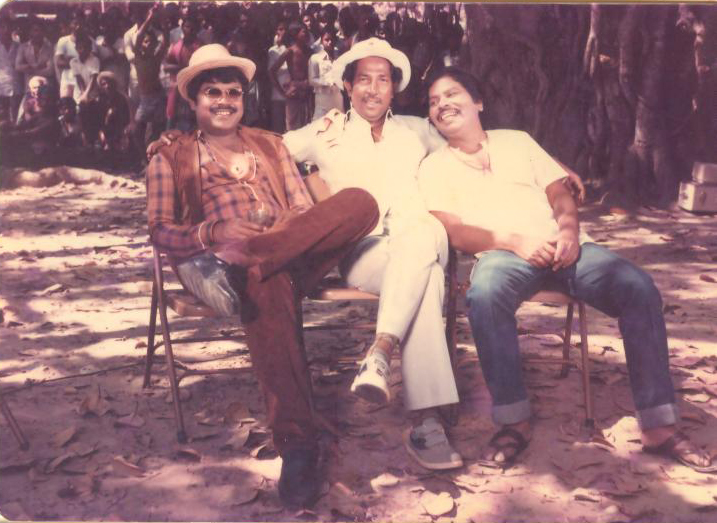
Mohammad Mohsin on the sets of Sahari Bagha

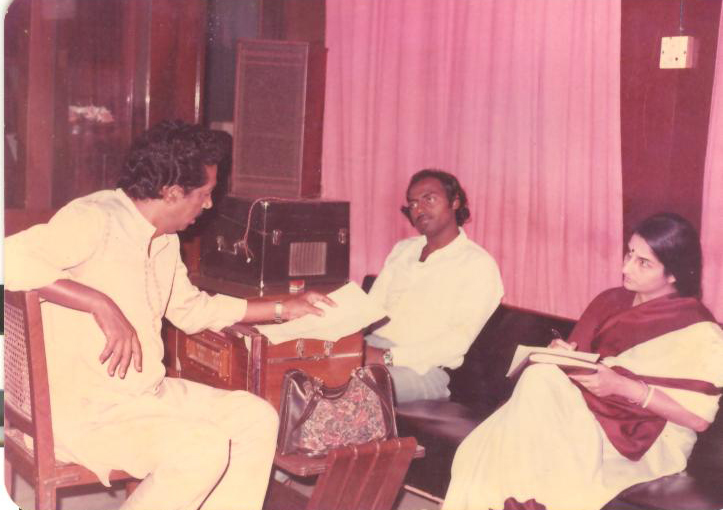
Mohammad Mohsin with Anuradha Paudwal

== Filmography ==
=== Actor ===
| Year | Movie | Character |
|---|---|---|
| 1976 | Shesha Shrabana | Kashi |
| 1977 | Naga Phasa | Sangram |
| 1978 | Balidaan | School Teacher |
| 1979 | Naiyya | Kassim |
| 1980 | Maa o Mamata | Raka |
| 1981 | Pooja | |
| 1982 | Hisab Nikas | Bagha |
| 1982 | Danda Balunga | Lawyer |
| 1983 | Janani | |
| 1985 | Sahari Bagha | Raja |
| 1987 | Eai Ta Dunia | Example |
| 1989 | Mamata Ra Dori | Anthony |
| 1989 | Bidhira Bidhan | Nitei |
| 2000 | Laxmi Pratima | Lawyer |

=== Director ===
| Year | Film | Extra Credits | Award |
|---|---|---|---|
| 1982 | Phula Chandana | Director, Screenplay & Dialogue | Odisha State Film Award for Best Director |
| 1982 | Danda Balunga | Director, Screenplay | |
| 1983 | Janani | Director, Dialogue | |
| 1984 | Jaga Hatare Pagha | Producer, director, Story & Screenplay | |
| 1985 | Sahari Bagha | Actor, Director | |
| 1986 | Chaka Bhaunri | Director, Story & Screenplay | |
| 1987 | Eai Ta Dunia | Actor, director, Story & Screenplay | |
| 1988 | Mamata Ra Dori | Actor, director, Story & Screenplay | |
| 1989 | Bidhira Bidhan | Director, Story & Screenplay | |
| 1990 | To Binu Anya Gati Nahin | Director, Screenplay | |
| 1992 | Lakhe Siba Puji Paichi Pua | Director, Screenplay | |
| 1993 | Laxman Rekha | Director, Screenplay | |
| 1995 | Dharma Sahile Hela | Director, Screenplay | |
| 1998 | Lakhmi Pratima | Director, Story & Screenplay | |
| 2001 | Mana Rahigala Tumari Thare | Director, Screenplay | |
| 2002 | Santana | Director, Screenplay | |
