= Namrata Das =

Indian actress from Odisha

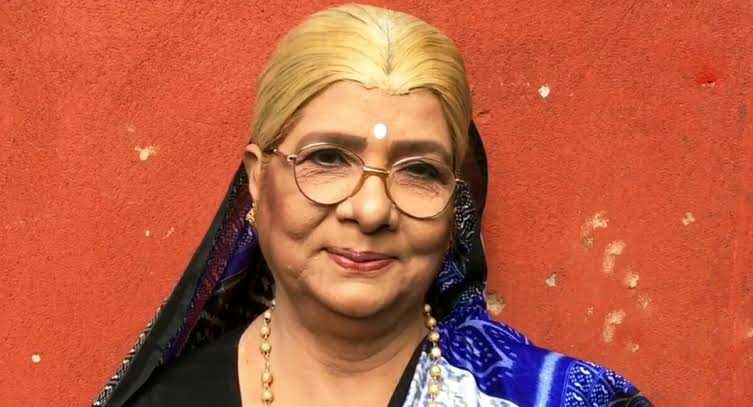
- Born: Alapua, Kendrapara, Odisha, India
- Other name: Dolly
- Occupation: Actress
- Years active: 1973–present
- Awards: Bhumi Kanya

Namrata Das is an Indian actress in Odia film Industry. Das is best known for her supporting roles often as a mother or grandmother in film and telivision. She made her film debut in Dharitri in 1973 and has since acted in over 200 Odia film and three Bengali films. In January 2020 Das received a ' Bhumi Kanya ' award for her contribution in the odia film industry. She is also the recipient of a state award for the film Lakshmi Pratima.

== Biography ==
Das was born to a Zamindar Karan family in Alapua in the state of Odisha. Her mother died when she was nine years old. She has four younger sisters and brothers.

== Awards ==
- 1998: Best supporting actress for film Lakshmi Pratima.
- 2020: Bhumi Kanya awards for Odia film industry

== Filmography ==
| Year | Film | Language |
|---|---|---|
| 2016 | Tu kahibu na mu | Odia |
| 2015 | Kie daba Takkar | Odia |
| 2015 | Jie jaha kahu mora dho | Odia |
| 2014 | Sindura | Odia |
| 2014 | Jay hind | Odia |
| 2013 | Gaddbadd | Odia |
| 2013 | Sandehi Priyatama | Odia |
| 2013 | Kehi Jane bhala lagere | Odia |
| 2013 | Tu mo dehara chhai | Odia |
| 2013 | Hata dhari chalutha | Odia |
| 2013 | Target | Odia |
| 2012 | Raju Awara | Odia |
| 2011 | Mane rahiba e prema kahani | Odia |
| 2011 | Balunga toka | Odia |
| 2011 | E mana khoje Manatie | Odia |
| 2010 | Prema Adhei Akhyara | Odia |
| 2010 | To akhire mun | Odia |
| 2010 | Tu thile mo Dara kahaku | Odia |
| 2009 | Aa re Sathia | Odia |
| 2009 | Abhimanyu | Odia |
| 2008 | Mate anidela lakshe faguna | Odia |
| 2007 | Mu Tate Love karuchhi | Odia |
| 2007 | Mahanayak | Odia |
| 2007 | Lakshmi Pratima | Odia |
| 2007 | Kali Shankar | Odia |
| 2007 | Chaka Chaka Bhaunri | Odia |
| 2006 | De Maa Shakti De | Odia |
| 2006 | Sashu Ghara Chalijibi | Odia |
| 2004 | Kandhei akhire luha | Odia |
| 2003 | Bidhata | Odia |
| 2003 | Sata Michha | Odia |
| 2003 | Sabata Maa | Odia |
| 2003 | Aeithi Swarga aeithi narka | Odia |
| 2002 | Rahichi Rahibi Tori Paain | Odia |
| 2002 | Rakter Sindoor | Bengali |
| 2002 | Dharma Sahile Hela | Odia |
| 2002 | Sei Jhiati | Odia |
| 2002 | Sindura nuhen khela ghara | Odia |
| 2001 | Mo kola to jhulana | Odia |
| 2001 | Baazi | Odia |
| 2001 | Dharma Debata | Odia |
| 2001 | Gare sindura dhare luha | Odia |
| 2000 | Babu Parshuram | Odia |
| 1999 | Dharma Nikiti | Odia |
| 1999 | Pua bhangidela suna sansara | Odia |
| 1999 | Maa goja Bayani | Odia |
| 1999 | Kalki Abatar | Odia |
| 1999 | Pabitra Bandhan | Odia |
| 1999 | Sola Shukrabar | Odia |
| 1998 | Rupa Gaanra Suna Kania | Odia |
| 1998 | Stree | Odia |
| 1997 | Nari bi pindhipare rakta sindura | Odia |
| 1997 | Ganga Siuli | Odia |
| 1996 | Sakala Tirtha to Charane | Odia |
| 1995 | Suna Panjuri | Odia |
| 1995 | Rakata kahiba kie kahara | Odia |
| 1994 | Bhai hela Bhagari | Odia |
| 1994 | Suna Bhauja | Odia |
| 1994 | Samaya Bada Balaban | Odia |
| 1994 | Gadhi janile Ghara sundara | Odia |
| 1993 | Bhagya hate doro | Odia |
| 1992 | Panjuri bhitare sari | Odia |
| 1992 | Maa | Bengali |
| 1991 | Ki heba sua poshile | Odia |
| 1990 | Paradesi Chadei | Odia |
| 1990 | Agni Beena | Odia |
| 1989 | Panchu Pandaba | Odia |
| 1988 | Bohu heba emiti | Odia |
| 1987 | Tunda Baida | Odia |
| 1983 | Kaberi | Odia |
| 1982 | Astaraga | Odia |
| 1981 | Akhi Trutia | Odia |
| 1980 | Anuradha | Odia |
| 1980 | Ramayan | Odia |
| 1978 | Balidan | Odia |
| 1978 | Taapoi | Odia |
| 1978 | Priyatama | Odia |
| 1976 | Krushna Sudama | Odia |
| 1976 | Sindura Bindu | Odia |
| 1973 | Kanakalata | Odia |
| 1973 | Dharitri | Odia |

== Television ==
| Serial | Network |
|---|---|
| Katha Kahuthile Saribani | DD Odia |
| Adhikara | DD Odia |
| Suna Kalasa | DD Odia |
| Gayatri | ETV Odia |
| Tapasya | ETV Odia |
| To Aganara Tulasi Mun | Sarthak TV |
| Tara Tarini | Tarang TV |
