= Matira Manisha =

- Directed by: Mrinal Sen
- Written by: Kalindi Charan Panigrahi
- Produced by: Babulal Doshi
- Starring: Prashanta Nanda; Sarat Pujari; Bhanumati Devi; Dukhiram Swain
- Cinematography: Sailaja Chatterjee
- Edited by: Gangadhar Naskar
- Music by: Bhubaneswar Misra
- Distributed by: Chhyabani Pratishthan
- Release date: 1966
- Running time: 125 minutes
- Country: India
- Language: Odia

Matira Manisha (Man of the Soil) is a 1966 Odia film directed by Mrinal Sen.

Based on the Kalindi Charan Panigrahi novel of the same name, the film contrasts traditional and modern values as exemplified by the different attitudes of two brothers towards their inherited family land. The plot explores human relationships using a wide range of themes, including Gandhian and Marxist ideologies, postwar social conditions, agrarian culture, rustic life, and traditional family values.

== Synopsis ==
The plot revolves round the family of Shama Pradhan, a rural farmer, and his two sons, Baraju (played by Sarat Pujari) and Chakadi (played by Prashanta Nanda), and disagreements over the family home and land after Pradhan's death.

On his death, Shama Pradhan entrusts his elder son Baraju with the responsibility of looking after his younger son Chakadi, and entreats him to keep the family land and home together, and not split it between the two brothers. Baraju is a peace-loving person who commands respect from the villagers for his idealistic way of life, and Baraju's wife Harabou (played by Bhanumati Devi) is portrayed as an ideal housewife, who is very caring and affectionate towards Chakadi, his wife Netramani (played by Sujata Anand) and their two children.

Chakadi, in contrast, is shown as carefree and irresponsible, happy to loaf around the village. His wife, Netramani, who is envious of Harabou, insists that the property should be split between the two brothers. A local troublemaker, Hari Mishra (played by Dukhiram Swain), also tries to sow discord between the two brothers.

Swayed by the designs of his wife Netramani, and of troublemaker Hari Mishra, Chakadi asks his elder brother to divide the property between them. Baraju is shocked, and is torn between his respect for his father's wishes and his affection for his brother. His solution is to hand over the land and the house to Chakadi, satisfying Chakadi's desire, while respecting his promise to his father not to partition the property. Baraju leaves the house with his wife Harabou and their two children, without regret or rancour.

After Baraju's departure, Chakadi feels miserable, is nostalgic about the old times, and wants his brother and family back. He goes to Baraju and begs him to return home. But Baraju, who is committed to the spirit of sacrifice, non-attachment, and love, advises Chakadi to go back home and take care of all that he has left behind.

== Cast ==
- Sarat Pujari as Baraju
- Prashanta Nanda as Chakadi
- Bhanumati Devi as Harabou
- Dukhiram Swain as Hari Mishra
- Sujata Anand as Netramani
- Ram Manya
- Kartick Ghosh
- Bhim Singh
- Snehalata
- Meeta
- Aloka Kanungo

== Crew ==
- Producer - Babulal Doshi
- Director - Mrinal Sen
- Story - Kalindi Charan Panigrahi
- Screanplay & Dialogue - Gopal Chhotaray
- Camera - Sailaja Chatterjee
- Music - Bhubaneswar Mishra
- Director Of Photography - Sailaja Chatterjee
- Editor - Gangadhar Naskar
- Art Direction - B. Kalyan

== Awards ==
- National Film Awards 1967 (Silver Lotus for Best Odia film)

== Music ==
- Rama Bibha Ghare Ho Lakhmana Bara Jaatri (sung by Akshaya Mohanty)
- Udigale Gendalia Jhadidele Para (sung by Akshaya Mohanty)
