= Shesha Shrabana =

- VCD cover
- Directed by: Prashant Nanda
- Written by: Basant Mahapatra
- Screenplay by: Shibabrata Das
- Produced by: Nagen Roy
- Starring: Prashant Nanda; Mahasweta Roy; Banaja Mohanrty; Hemant Das; Dukhiram Swain; Dhira Biswall; Mohammad Mohsin
- Cinematography: Rajan Kinegi
- Edited by: Madhu Naik
- Music by: Prafulla Kar
- Production company: Shri Jaganath films
- Release date: 14 September 1976
- Running time: 129 min
- Country: India
- Language: Odia

Shesha Shrabana is a 1976 Odia language Indian movie. It is directed by Prashant Nanda. It stars Prashant Nanda, Mahasweta Roy, Banaja Mohanty and Hemant Das. It is based on a novel of Basant Mahapatra by the same name. In 1979, the film remade as Naiyya in Hindi language by the same director. This film achieved great success in terms of box office and acclaimed by reviewers.

== Synopsis ==
Sania (Prashant Nanda) lives with his ailing mother and friend Makara in village. They are fishermen by profession. One day they find a girl named Manika (Mahasweta Roy) in the river and rescue her. Sania brings the girls to his home and they look after the girl. After Manika gets well, Sania & Makara decide to return Manika to her parents. When they reach Manika's village, Manika's parent refuse to accept her back as she cohabited with lower caste people for some days. As no other way out, Sania takes Manika to his home. Manika falls in love with Sania. But Sania's heart doesn't allow him to accept the Manka's offer as Manika belongs to a higher caste. Sania, in the meantime tries to find out suitable match for Manika and finds a doctor, who comes to the village for the treatment of plague disease as the village was effected by plague. The doctor agrees to marry Manika and leaves the town to get his family's approval. But days pass away, the doctor doesn't return. All the villagers in the village complain against Sania and Manika living together. Manika could not bear the comments made by the villager and vanished. Sania could not control himself and turns insane.

== Cast ==
- Prashant Nanda ... Sania
- Mahasweta Roy ... Manika
- Hemanta Das ... Makara
- Banaja Mohanty... Gauri
- Dukhiram Swain ... Nidhi Misra
- Narendra Behera ... Bhola
- Dhira Biswal ... Village Doctor
- Mohammad Mohsin ... Kashi

== Soundtrack ==
Music of the film is composed by Prafulla Kar.

Song	Lyrics	Singer(s)
"Haire Hai Garaje Megha Ghum Ghum Mayura Nache"	Shibabrata Das	Chitta Jena, Vani Jayaram
"Maajhi Re Shesha Shrabana Puraba Pabana"	Shibabrata Das	Pranab Patnaik
"Manika Alo Alo Manika E Mora Manika"	Shibabrata Das	Chitta Jena & Mohd. Habib
"Megha barashila Tupuru Tupuru Keshura"	Shibabrata Das	Vani Jayaram
"Kaali Kapali Narmundamali Mun Basuli"	Prafulla Kar	Prafulla Kar

== Box office ==
The film created a box office record and did run for several weeks in theaters.

== Trivia ==
Actress Mahasweta Roy debuted in the film after played a small role in the film Sindura Bindu. The film was part of Indian Panorama in 9th International Film Festival of India 1977 held in New Delhi.

== Awards ==
- 24th National Film Awards
  - Best Feature Film in Odia
- Orissa State Film Awards1976
  - Best feature film
  - Best director ...Prashant Nanda
  - Best story ...Basant Mahapatra
  - Best composer - Prafulla Kar
