= Dharitri =

- Poster
- Directed by: Nitai Palit
- Written by: Amulya Kumari Patnaik
- Produced by: Dhira Biswal
- Starring: Sarat Pujari; Prasant Nanda; Sriram Panda; Dhira Biswal
- Cinematography: S. Swant
- Edited by: Ramesh Joshi
- Music by: Upendra Kumar
- Production company: Progressive Films Productions
- Distributed by: Progressive Films Productions
- Release date: 30 March 1973
- Running time: 278 min
- Country: India
- Language: Odia

Dharitri is a social satire drama in Odia, released on 30 March, 1973. It is based on Amulya Kumari Patnaik's novel of the same name. Sarat Pujari, Prashant Nanda, Sriram Panda, Bhanumati Devi and Dhira Biswal acted in key roles.

== Plot ==
Girish Choudhury is a pseudo-social activist and politician. He has two sons, Subhendu and Sudhir. To get popularity in society, he gets his daughter-in-law from a poor family for his son Subhendu. Subhendu doesn't like his wife Mamata and stays in town engaged in the contracting business with the help of his father. Girish's wife always tortures Mamata and asks for dowry. Mamata silently bears all the pain and torture caused by her mother-in-law. Sudhir, a revolutionist, doesn't accept the things happening in his house and revolts against his father, mother and brother. at last he gets success uniting Subhendu and Mamata.

== Cast ==
- Sarat Pujari as Subhendu Choudhury
- Bhanumati Devi as Girish's wife
- Prashant Nanda as Rabi
- Sriram Panda as Sudhir Choudhury
- Dhira Biswal as Girish Choudhury
- Sandhya Acharya as Mamata
- Bhim Singh as Braja
- Govind Tej as Usha's father
- Shyamalendu Bhattacharjee as Sudhir's friend
- Dinabandhu Das as Murali
- Babaji Sahu as Mamu
- Narendra Behera as Sudhir's friend
- Aneema Pedini as Ragini
- Alpana Nayak as Usha

== Soundtrack ==
The music for the film was composed by Upendra Kumar.

| Song | Lyrics | Singer(s) |
|---|---|---|
| "Pirati Tora Duru Juhara" | Brundaban Jena | Chita Ranjan Jena, Sipra Bose |
| "Prananatha Naileta Jibana Hari" | Sibabrata Das | Sipra Bose |
| "Sapanara Pathe Pathe" | Sibabrata Das | Sikandar Alam |
| "Swargadapi Gariyasi Janani Maa Dharitri" | Sibabrata Das | Shyamal Mitra |
| "Mohan He Mohan" | Narayan Prasad Singh | Nirmla Misra |
| "Barambar Dele Parichaya" | Narayan Prasad Singh | Sikandar Alam, Sipra Bose |

== Trivia ==
Actor Sriram Panda debuted in the film.

== Awards ==
- 2nd Orissa State Film Awards 1974
  - Best Film
  - Best director - Nitai Palit
