= To Aganara Tulasi Mun =

Indian Odia language TV series

- Genre: Soap opera
- Directed by: Keshav Malik
- Starring: See below
- Country of origin: India
- Original language: Odia
- No. of episodes: 1863

Production
- Production locations: Bhubaneswar, Odisha
- Camera setup: Multi-camera
- Running time: 22 minutes

Original release
- Network: Zee Sarthak
- Release: 8 October 2012 – 16 March 2019

Related
- Mo Aganara Tulasi Tu

To Aganara Tulasi Mun (transl. I am the basil of your yard) is an Indian Odia language Soap opera which aired on Zee Sarthak. It premiered from 8 October 2012 and ended on 16 March 2019. It is the first longest ran Odia soap opera with 1,863 episodes.

== Plot ==
The story follows the journey of a young girl named Tulasi, who is in love with Chandan. However, Lisa is also smitten by him and wants to marry him. Tulasi decides to stand by Chandan and his family amid oppositions from Lisa and others. How she faces these is the story.

== Cast ==
- Swetlana Bhattacharya/Lipsa Mishra/Jessy a.k.a. Pralipta Priyadarshini Samalas Tulasi (aka Iccha)
- Manshi Pal as Kuni Tulasi (KT) Tulasi and Chandan's daughter
- Tushar as Chandan
- Chhandita as Lisa
- Bhagaban Behera as Dr. Meher
- Rajesh Mishra
- Aswini Kumar Brahma
- Namrata Das
- Anil Kumar Nayak
- Gyanendra Kumar Pallai
- Mamta Padhi as Nirmala
- Biren Mishra

== Production ==
=== Casting ===
Initially, Svetlana played the role of tulsi. After her exit, Jessy replaced her. In 2016, Jessy was arrested on charges of abetment to suicide of telly actor Ranjit Patnaik aka Raja and Lipsa Misra replaced her. But Jessy got bail within 15 days and reentered the serial. Bhagwan Behera who played the main character Dr. Meher has left the serial protesting her entry.

=== Reception ===
The series was one of the most watched Odia language television program at its run time. In week 18 and 19 of 2014, it garnered a trp of 3.3 and 3.63 being the second most and most watched Odia language television program in the two weeks.
