= Rangin Jajabara =

1975 Indian Odia-language film

- Poster
- Directed by: Bijay Mishra; Akshaya Mohanty; Hemanta Das
- Written by: Bijay Mishra
- Screenplay by: Bijay Mishra; Akshaya Mohanty; Hemanta Das
- Produced by: Bijay Pattnaik
- Starring: Shriram Panda; Banaja Mohanty; Tripura Mishra; Pira Mishra; Dukhiram Swain; Jairam Samal
- Cinematography: Srinivas Mohapatra
- Edited by: Madan Gupte
- Music by: Akshaya Mohanty
- Production company: Trimurty Films
- Distributed by: Brajaraj Movies
- Release date: 1975
- Country: India
- Language: Odia

Rangin Jajabara is a 1975 Odia language Indian movie. The music was composed by Akshya Mohanty. It was produced by Bijay Pattnaik, directed by Akshaya Mohanty, Hemanta Das and Bijay Mishra (Trimurty). The movie stars Sriram Panda, Banaja Mohanty and Tripura Mishra. Jajabar was the first black-and-white film in Odia to be digitally colorized and re-released in the state.

The film's story is based on the nomad lifestyle. The nomad turned into a human being falls in love, fights for love and wins love fighting with many ifs and buts.

== Synopsis ==
Rashbihari Samantrai is a landlord who has two sons Anu and Arup. Anu is an industrialist and plans to start an industry in "Sundari Tota", a place owned by his father and inhabited by rural folks. But Rashbihari had promised to donate "Sundari Tota" to his religious guru for building an Ashram. The villagers request Rashbihari not to evacuate them from "Sundari Tota" as they had been living there for years. The second son, Arup, is in love with one of the village girls, Jhili. The villagers revolt back with Jhili's father against the decision to donate the land to his religious guru. At last Arup convinces his father to not donate the land and ends up marrying Jhili.

== Cast ==
- Sriram Panda... Arup Samantrai
- Banaja Mohanty... Jhili
- Tripura Misra... Sujata
- Anita Das... Sunanda
- Hemanta Das... Nilakantha
- Dukhiram Swain... Rasbihari Samantrai
- Samuel Sahu... Jagabandhu
- Shyamalendu Bhattacharjee... Gopi
- Master Mania... Anu Samantrai
- J.N. Das... Brundaban
- Pira Misra... Priest
- Jairam Samal... Sadhu Baba's assistant
- Pratap Rath... Paria
- Preeti Patnaik... Chameli
- Radharani... Aunt
- Bhabani Panda... Clerk
- Pramod Mohanty... Sadhu Baba
- Meera... Brajabasi

== Soundtrack ==
Song	Lyrics	Singer(s)
"Jajabara Mana Mora Simahin Asha Mora"	Akshaya Mohanty	Akshaya Mohanty
"Hae Se Harini Aakhi Anila Mote"	Akshaya Mohanty	Pranab Pattnaik
"Phur Kina Udi Galaa Bani"	Akshaya Mohanty	Trupti Das, Geeta Patnaik
"Danei Dasi Kahere"	Akshaya Mohanty	Akshaya Mohanty, Geeta Patnaik
"Gadi Chale Pachhei"	Akshaya Mohanty	Akshaya Mohanty, Trupti Das

== Colourisation ==
The black and white Oriya film Jajabara was converted to colour. With his team of digital artist, Tilak Ray and 18 roto artists, Bapu Lenka has made an exceptional effort to revive and preserve the loved movie, making it the first black and white regional film of the country to have been colourised. Never would have been possible without the effort of 21 technocrats and 736 days of time to rework the film. Tilak Ray, the Director of Digital Painting along with his associated roto-artists colourised 2,19,000 frames of the black and white movie.

== Awards ==
- Orissa State Film Awards1975
  - Best Actress - Banaja Mohanty
