= Malajahna =

- Poster
- Directed by: Nitai Palit
- Written by: Upendra kishore Das
- Screenplay by: Nitai Palit
- Produced by: Sriprasad Kanunugo; Akshaya Mohanty; Akshaya Mohanty (Kashyap); Arabinda Misra
- Starring: Jharana Das; Akshaya Mohanty (Kashyap); Bhim Singh; Manimala; Pira Misra
- Cinematography: Alok Das and Sona Mukharjee
- Music by: Akshaya Mohanty
- Production company: Shree Films
- Distributed by: Sakha Distributors
- Release date: 10 December 1965
- Country: India
- Language: Odia

Malajahna (Dead Moon) is a 1965 Oriya film written and directed by Nitai Palit based on a novel of the same title by the Oriya novelist Upendra Kishore Das. The film stars Akshaya Mohanty (Kashyap) and Jharana Das in the lead. Considered as a classic in the history of Oriya cinema, the film deals with an unusual theme in seventies in rural India of love between a married woman and a young man.

This love story is narrated in the context of life in rural Orissa infested by superstitions, narrow caste prejudices and acute poverty. Women were like slaves with no mind and choice of their own and child marriages were widely prevalent. The agony and suffering of Sati may be seen as essentially related to the social evils that afflicted contemporary rural Orissa.

== Plot ==
Sati, the female protagonist of the movie, is forced into a marriage by her poor parents with a rich ugly old man living with a concubine. She finds another way to overcome the mishap in her life when a young neighbor Nath develops love interest in her. Both finally leave the village and escape to Cuttack town. The conservative neighbors question their relationship. Sati, unable to bear the scandal concerning her and Natha, finally commits suicide by jumping into the river.

== Cast ==
- Jharana Das as Sati
- Akshaya Mohanty (Kashyap) as Nath
- Manimala as Sati's mother
- Pira Misra
- Sarat Mohanty as Achuti
- Bhim Singh as Saita
- Purna Singh
- Geeta Dutt as Nishi/Baula

== Production ==
The project was started in 1962 with the efforts of Akshaya Mohanty and Akshaya Mohanty (Kashyap). Some friends of the duo like Sarat Dev, Sriprasad Kanunugo and Arabinda Misra also supported them to overcome the financial crises. After four to five days of shooting, the project stopped due to financial crises. In 1963, the erstwhile king of Alli, Ban Bihari Dev again poured money to continue the project. After 60 percent shooting of the project was completed, the project stopped for another one year due to the same financial crises. At last Akshaya Mohanty sought help of the producer and director Dhira Biswal. He took the responsibility on his shoulders and the film released in 1965.

== Music ==
The music of the film was composed by the debutant Akshaya Mohanty and the lyrics were written by Kabisurya Baladev Rath, Banamali and Binodini Devi. Singers were Akshay Mohanty, Pranab Patanaik, Nandita Ghose, Kalyani Bhattacharya and Nirmala Mishra. The tracks from the film include:

"Tuchhaku Mahu" sung by Kalyani Bhattacharya

"Mo Nan Te" sung by Nirmala Mishra

"Rakata Tala Mala" sung by Akshay Mohanty

"Mora Antara Mandire" sung by Pranab Patanaik

"Mu Ta Kularu Gali" sung by Pranab Patanaik and Kalyani Bhattacharya

"Galanita" sung by Akshay Mohanty

== Awards ==
- National Film Awards(1965) -Certificate of merit for best Odia film
