= Swapna Sagara =

1983 Odia film directed by Prashanta Nanda

- Poster
- Directed by: Prasanta Nanda
- Written by: Prasanta Nanda
- Produced by: Prasanta Nanda
- Starring: Prashant Nanda, Sriram Panda, Mahasweta Ray, Dukhiram Swain, Anita Das
- Music by: Akshaya Mohanty
- Release date: 1983
- Country: India
- Language: Odia

Swapna Sagara is a 1983 Indian Odia-language film. It was produced, directed and written by Prashant Nanda. Music was scored by Akshaya Mohanty. The movie featured Dukhiram Swain, Prashant Nanda, Sriram Panda, Mahasweta Ray and Anita Das. It was the first 70mm movie in Odia cinema.

Nanda, at the age of nine read the novel "Baliraja", written by Kahnucharan Mohanty. Years later he wrote the screenplay of Swapna Sagara, drawing inspiration from it.

== Songs ==
- "Chithi Mora Tiki Chadhei"
- "Sei Dipa Achi Sei Phoola"
- "Ae Panire Panire"
- "Batoi Bhai"
- "Sikari Sikari"
- "Sagara Sagara Sagara Buku Re"
