= Dukhiram Swain =

Indian actor (born 1995)

- Born: Unknown; Daraba, Odisha, India
- Died: January 18, 1995
- Occupation: Actor,
- Years active: 1960–1994
- Spouse: Hemalatha Swain

Dukhiram Swain (died 18 January 1995) was an Indian film and television actor. He was one of the most popular villains in Odia cinema and played a variety of roles most notably as the antagonist in many Odia films and various roles in television serials. He was considered to be one amongst the club of natural actors. He won the National Film Award for Shesha Shrabana (1976), the Orissa State Film Award for Best Supporting Actor and several "Best Villain" awards from State Film Awards and the Odisha Sangeet Natak Akademi. He was honoured with the Jayadeva Purashkar of Odisha.

== Life and career ==
Late Dukhiram Swain was born in Daraba, Jagatsinghpur district, Odisha. He was a linguist and could speak several languages fluently. He started his acting Career from Annapurna Theatre (Cuttack ). His first movie was Sri Lokenath (1960). He was mostly offered negative roles and over the years he developed a cult status in this genre of acting. On contrary to the villainous characters he portrayed in his films, he was very social & generous and was also member of various organizations. Matira Manisha, Jajabara, Shesha Shrabana, Phula Chandana, Paradeshi Chadhei and Rana Bhumi are some of his most notable films. He has acted almost all kinds of roles ranging from hero, villain, comedian, character roles etc.

== Awards and honours ==
- He was honoured with Orissa Sangeet Nataka Akademi Award for the Year 1984-85 in the Acting category.
- He was honoured with Orissa State Film Award for Best Supporting Actor : Bhulihuena in 1987.
- He was honoured with the Jayadev Award (1994) for outstanding contribution to the growth and development of Oriya cinema.

== Filmography ==
- Lakhe Siba Puji Paichi Pua (1997)
- Rana Bhumi (1995) As Pradhan
- Akuha Katha (1994)
- Rakhile Siba Mariba Kie (1994)
- Sagar Ganga (1994) As Bhabhani Rai
- Suna Bhauja (1994)
- Bhagya Hate Doro (1993) As Mahendra
- Dadagiri (1993) As S.P. Abinash
- Anti Churi Tanti Kate (1992)
- Ghara Mora Swarga (1992)
- Maa Jahara Saha (1992) As Nishakar
- To Binu Anya Gati Nahin (1991) As Satura
- Udandi Seeta as Police Inspector
- Ama Ghara Ama Sansar (1991)
- Bastra Haran (1991) As Magistrate/ Abhijit's father
- Kapala Likhana (1991)
- Drishti, 1990
- Chakadola Karuchi Leela (1990)
- Daiba Daudi (1990) as Jailor/Bobby's father
- Hisab Kariba Kalia (1990) As Chowdhury
- Maa Mate Shakti De (1990)
- Paradeshi Chadhei (1990)
- Asuchi Mo Kalia Suna (1989)
- Pratisodha Aparadh Nuhen (1989)
- Sasti (1989)
- Jahaku Rakhibe Ananta (1989) As Jagdish Rai
- Kanyadaan (1988) As Kailash Chowdhury
- Pua Moro Kala Thakura (1988)
- Akashara Aakhi (1987)
- Chaka Aakhi Sabu Dekhuchi (1987)
- Jor Jar Mulak Tar (1986) As Rudra Narayan
- Phula Chandana (1986)
- Grihalakshmi (1985) As Ashok's father
- Chaka Bhaunri (1985)
- Hakim Babu (1985)
- Mamata Mage Mula (1985)
- Samay Bada Balwan (1985)As D. J.
- School Master (1985)
- Dora (1984) As Wine vendor
- Swapna Sagara (1983) As Sardar
- Batasi Jhada (1981)
- Bilwa Mangala (1981)
- Sei Sura (1981)
- Balidan (1978)
- Jhilmil (1978)
- Saakhi Gopinath (1978)
- Shesha Shrabana (1976) As Nidhi Misra
- Jajabara (1975) As Rashbihari Samantrai
- Adina Megha (1970)
- Matira Manisha (1966) As Hari Mishra
- Sri Lokenath (1960)

== Photo gallery ==
Mamata Mage Mula (1985)

Mamata Mage Mula (1985)

With Co-Star Hemant Das ( Mamata Mage Mula )

Mamata Mage Mula

Mamata Mage Mula

== Personal life ==
He was married to the late Mrs. Hemalata Swain. He is survived by two sons, Mr. Akash Kumar Swain (Jagatsinghpur), Mr. Prithiviraj Swain (Cuttack) and one daughter, Mrs. Dharitri (Swain) Das (the marriage was to Mr. Nimain Charana Das and was settled in Bolangir). He is survived, as well, by three grandchildren from his daughter's side, Mrs. Pragyan Paramita Das (the marriage was to Mr. Dhrutiman Das and was settled in Bangalore), Ms. Prachi Sucharita Das (Bhubaneswar), and Mr. Niroopkanti Das (Patnagarh).
