= Vani Jairam =

Indian singer (1945–2023)

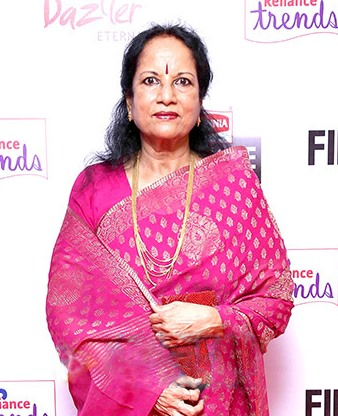
- Vani in 2014
- Born: Kalaivani; 30 November 1945; Vellore, Madras Province, British India (now Tamil Nadu, India)
- Died: 4 February 2023 (aged 77); Chennai, Tamil Nadu, India
- Other name: South Indian Meera
- Education: Queen Mary's College, Chennai
- Occupation: Playback singer
- Spouse: Jairam (m. 1969; died 2018)
- Parents: Duraisamy Iyer; Padmavathi
- Awards: Padma Bhushan (2023) National Film Award for Best Female Playback Singer Filmfare Awards
- Website: vanijairam.com

Vani Jairam (born Kalaivani; 30 November 1945 – 4 February 2023) was a playback singer in Indian cinema. She is referred to as the "Meera of modern India" Vani's career started in 1971 and has spanned over five decades. She did playback for over one thousand Indian movies recording over 20,000 songs. In addition, she recorded thousands of devotionals and private albums and also participated in numerous solo concerts in India and abroad.

Renowned for her vocal range and easy adaptability to any difficult composition, Vani has often been the choice for several composers across India from the 1970s until the late 1990s. She has sung in several Indian languages including Kannada, Tamil, Hindi, Telugu, Malayalam, Marathi, Odia, Sanskrit, Gujarati, Haryanvi, Assamese, Tulu, Kashmiri, Bhojpuri, Marwari, Urdu, Konkani, Punjabi and Bengali languages.

Vani is the youngest artist to be awarded the "Sangeet Peet Samman". She won the National Film Awards for Best Female Playback Singer three times and also has won State Government awards from the states of Odisha, Andhra Pradesh, Tamil Nadu and Gujarat. In 2012, she was honored with the Filmfare Lifetime Achievement Award – South for her achievements in South Indian film music. In July 2017 she was honored with the Best Female Singer at the NAFA 2017 event at New York City.

She was well versed in various forms of music, including Carnatic, Hindustani, thumri, ghazal and bhajan. Apart from singing, she was also a songwriter, composer and painter.

== Early life and education ==
Vani was born as Kalaivani in Vellore in Tamil Nadu, in a classically trained musicians family, as a fifth daughter in a family of six daughters and three sons. Her parents, Duraisamy Iyer and Padmavathi, trained under Ranga Ramunaja Iyengar and enrolled her in his classes, where he taught her a few Muthuswami Dikshitar kritis. Later she was given formal Carnatic training under the guidance of Kadalur Srinivas Iyengar, T. R. Balasubramanian, and R. S. Mani.

Vani was glued to the Radio Ceylon channel and was attracted to Hindi film songs to the extent that she used to memorize and reproduce the entire orchestration of the songs that used to repeatedly play on the Radio. At the age of 8, she gave her first public performance at All India Radio, Madras.

Vani did her schooling at Lady Sivasamy High School, Chennai. She then graduated from the Queen Mary's College, Chennai. Post her studies, Vani was employed with the State Bank of India, Madras, and later in 1967, she was transferred to the Hyderabad branch.

== Early career in Mumbai ==
After her marriage to Jairam in 1969, she moved to Mumbai to set up her family. Upon her request, she was transferred to the Mumbai branch of her bank. Knowing her singing skills, Jairam persuaded Vani to get trained in the Hindustani classical music and she enrolled under Ustad Abdul Rehman Khan of the Patiala gharana. Her rigorous training under him made her quit her bank job and take up music as her profession. She learned the nuances of various vocal forms such as Thumri, Ghazal and Bhajan under Khan's tutelage and gave her first public concert in 1969. In the same year, she was introduced to the composer Vasant Desai who was recording a Marathi album with singer Kumar Gandharva. Upon listening to her voice, Desai chose her to sing the song "Runanubandhacha" for the same album along with Kumar Gandharva. The album released to much popularity among the Marathi audience and the duet song was well received. She sang with the veteran vocalist Agra Charan Pt. Dinkar Kaikini in the 1979 film Meera. The music was given by Pt. Ravi Shankar.

== Career ==
=== Tamil cinema ===
While Vani's popularity continued to soar in Bollywood cinema, she started getting offers from the Cinema of South India. In 1973, she recorded her first Tamil song for the film Thayum Seiyum under the music direction of S. M. Subbaiah Naidu. However, the film remains unreleased to date and the song remained in the cans. Her first released song was a duet romantic song with T. M. Soundararajan for the film Veettukku Vandha Marumagal (1973). The song "Or Idam Unnidam" was composed by the duo Shankar–Ganesh, with whom, Vani went on to record maximum songs in Tamil cinema. Immediately after this, she was employed by one of the most successful director-composer duos, K. Balachander and M. S. Viswanathan, for their successful film Sollathaan Ninaikkiren for a solo song "Malarpol Sirippathu Pathinaaru". Thus began her long association with the top-rated music directors in Tamil cinema. Her biggest break came through the song "Malligai En Mannan Mayangum" from the film Dheerga Sumangali (1974), again composed by M. S. Viswanathan. Vani recalled that it was a challenging song and "he (Viswanathan) trusted me with it". She sang many songs composed by M.S.Viswanathan and Shankar–Ganesh. M.S.Viswanathan by seeing her amazing grasping power and ability to write swaras immediately mentioned her as 'Blotting paper'. When Vani was in Madras (now Chennai) for two music concerts at a Bhajan Sammelan, Viswanathan, who was the chief guest, was impressed by her performance and gave her the opportunity to sing the song. The song received laurels and accolades for both its composition and vocal rendition. It was in the same year, she recorded a duet song with S. P. Balasubrahmanyam for music director Vijaya Bhaskar for the film Engamma Sapatham. It was later reported that Vani's voice featured in all the films which had Vijaya Bhaskar as the composer in both Tamil and Kannada film industries.

The year 1975 turned out to be the first most eventful year for Vani since she won her first National Film Award for Best Female Playback Singer for the songs she rendered in the film Apoorva Raagangal. The songs "Ezhu Swarangalukkul" and "Kelviyin Nayagane" made her popularity soar to heights and she became known as the singer who would always get selected to sing difficult compositions. She was flooded with singing offers from all the top-rated music composers, including M. S. Viswanathan, Kunnakkudi Vaidyanathan, Sankar Ganesh, V. Kumar, K. V. Mahadevan, G. K. Venkatesh and Vijaya Bhaskar. In 1977, she first recorded her voice for Ilaiyaraaja's composition in the film Bhuvana Oru Kelvi Kuri. She won her first Tamil Nadu State Film Award for Best Female Playback for the song "Naane Naana" composed by Ilaiyaraaja for the film Azhage Unnai Aarathikkiren (1979). With Ilaiyaraaja, Vani went on to record many popular songs in the 1980s for the films such as Mullum Malarum (1978), Rosappo Ravikaikaari (1979), Anbulla Rajinikanth (1984), Nooravathu Naal (1984), Vaidehi Kathirunthal (1984), Oru Kaidhiyin Diary (1985) and Punnagai Mannan (1986). In 1994, composer A. R. Rahman recorded her voice for the film Vandicholai Chinraasu for a duet song with S. P. Balasubrahmanyam. Later in 2014, she recorded a portion of the Thiruppugazh composed by Rahman, for the period film Kaaviyathalaivan and followed it with the song "Narayana" in the film Ramanujan.

Jairam recorded thousands of Tamil songs both in solo and duet formats. Many of her duet songs have been recorded along with T. M. Soundararajan, P. B. Srinivas, K. J. Yesudas, S. P. Balasubrahmanyam and Jayachandran. Songs like "Ezhu Swarangalukkul", "Keliviyin Nayagane", "Ennulil Engo", "Yaaradhu Sollamal", "Megamae Megamae", "Kavidhai Kelungal", "Nadhamenum Kovililae", "Aana Kana" and "Sugamana Raagangale" are considered amongst the best compositions to be recorded in Vani's voice. The first Ghazal type song in Tamil movies was "Megame magame" written by Vairamuthu was sung by Vani Jayaram.

=== Telugu cinema ===
Vani's contribution towards Telugu cinema and devotional songs have been extensive and widespread. She recorded her first Telugu song for the film Abhimanavanthulu (1973). The song "Eppativalekaadura Naa Swami", composed by S. P. Kodandapani, was a classical dance-based song. Her songs for the film Pooja (1975) brought her to the forefront of Telugu cinema. The songs "Poojalu Cheya" and "Ennenno Janmala Bandham" became household hits and cemented her position. It was for the K. Viswanath's musical film Sankarabharanam (1980), Vani increased her popularity by singing five songs and winning her second National Film award for all the songs collectively. She was also awarded the Andhra Pradesh government's Nandi Award for Best Female Playback Singer for the same songs. She went on to collaborate with director Viswanath and music director K. V. Mahadevan for many films like Sruthilayalu (1987), Sankarabharanam and Swathi Kiranam. Later in 1990, the same team produced the film Swathi Kiranam which was again musically noted; all the songs sung by Vani were received well. She received her third National Film Award for the film.

Apart from K. V. Mahadevan, Vani recorded many Telugu songs for Rajan–Nagendra, Satyam, Chakravarthy, M. S. Viswanathan and Ilaiyaraaja. She recorded most of the dubbed songs from Tamil composed by Ilaiyaraaja.

=== Hindi cinema ===
Vani's good professional association with Vasant Desai resulted in her breakthrough with the film Guddi (1971) directed by Hrishikesh Mukherjee. Desai offered Vani to record three songs in the film amongst which the song "Bole Re Papihara", featuring Jaya Bachchan in the lead role, became a talk-of-the-town song and gave her instant recognition. Composed in Miyan Ki Malhar raag, the song showcased her classical prowess and subsequently fetching her many laurels and awards including the Tansen Samman (for best classical-based song in a Hindi film), the Lions International Best Promising Singer award, the All India Cinegoers Association award, and the All India Film-goers Association award for the Best Playback Singer in 1971. Her other song Humko Mann Ki Shakti Dena; Mann Vijaya Karein [O God! Please give us strength to conquer our weaknesses] became a school prayer since the release of the song in 1971 and continues to be even now. She toured the entire Maharashtra state, accompanying her mentor, Desai, and taught many Marathi songs to school children.

Jairam went on to sing a few songs each for music directors of Hindi cinema, which remain popular, including the Chitragupta song, classical Naushad compositions More Saajan Souten Ghar from Pakeezah (1972) and Dulhan Badi Jadugarni, a duet with Asha Bhosle in Aaina (1977), Madan Mohan composition Pyar Kabhi Kam Na Karna Sanam, a duet with Kishore Kumar in the film Ek Mutthi Aasmaan (1973), R. D. Burman song Zindagi Mein Aap Aaye, a duet with Mukesh in Chhalia (1973), Shyamji Ghanshyamji composition Teri Jheel Si Gehri from film Dhuan Ki Lakeer, a duet with Nitin Mukesh, and the solo song Aa Balam composed by Kalyanji-Anandji in the film Dharm Aur Qanoon.

Jairam sang several songs composed by O.P. Nayyar from the film Khoon Ka Badla Khoon (1978) including duets with Mohammed Rafi and also with Uttara Kelkar and Pushpa Pagdhare. She sang the duet song Maine Tumhe Paa Liya with Rafi composed by Laxmikant-Pyarelal in Jurm Aur Sazaa, and a duet with Manna Dey in Parinay (1974) composed by Jaidev and the solo song Pee Kahan in Solva Sawan (1979) by Jaidev.

The song "Mere To Giridhar Gopal" in Meera (1979), composed by Pandit Ravi Shankar, won her first Filmfare Award for Best Female Playback Singer. She recorded as many as 12 bhajans for the film Meera which became highly popular.

=== Malayalam cinema ===
Vani Jairam made her Malayalam debut in 1973 by recording the solo song "Sourayudhathil Vidarnnoru" composed by Salil Chowdhary for the film Swapnam. The song became hugely popular, giving good credibility to Vani and gave her career a breakthrough. She went on to record over 600 songs in Malayalam cinema. Vani collaborated with all the popular Malayalam composers such as M. K. Arjunan, G. Devarajan, M. S. Viswanathan, R. K. Shekhar, V. Dakshinamoorthy, M. S. Baburaj, Shyam, A. T. Ummer, M. B. Sreenivasan, K. Raghavan, Jerry Amaldev, Kannur Rajan, Johnson, Raveendran and Ilaiyaraaja. Her rendition of the song "Aashada Maasam", composed by R. K. Shekhar for the film Yudhabhoomi (1976) met with wide appreciation and further increased her popularity. In 1981, she sang "Kanana Poikayil Kalabham" along with K. J. Yesudas in the composition of M. K. Arjunan for the film Ariyapedatha Rahasyam directed by P. Venu. After a long hiatus, Vani returned to Malayalam cinema in 2014 by recording a duet song for the film 1983, and followed it up with a duet song in Action Hero Biju (2016).

Some of Vani's Malayalam songs including "Olanjali Kuruvi", "Pookkal Panineer", "Etho janma kalpanayil", "Poo kondu poo moodi" (Palangal), "Manjil chekkerum" (Raktham), "Onnanam Kunninmel" (Airhostess), "nanam nin kannil" (kelkatha sabdham),"Manju pozhiyunnu" (Uthradarathri) "Thiruvonapularithan" (Thiruvonam), "Dhoomthana" (Thomasleeha), "Seemantha Rekhayil" (Aasheervaadam), "Naadan Paatile", "manjani kombil", "Nimishangal", "Thedi Thedi", "Moodal Manjumai Yamini", "Ee Raagadeepam", "Mandhaarapoo", "Taarake", "Hrudayathin Madhura", "Neelambarathile", "Navaneetha Chandrike", "Oru Raaga Nimishatil", "Thechi Pootha", "Yamini Nin Choodayil" amongst others are widely popular and considered among the best hits. Most of Vani's duets in Malayalam are recorded with K. J. Yesudas and P. Jayachandran.

The title song "Marathe Marikurumbe" in the film "Puli Murugan", rendered by Jairam, was short-listed in 70 songs which were considered eligible for nomination to the 2018 Oscar Award, under the category of "Original Song".

=== Kannada cinema ===
Music director Vijaya Bhaskar who worked with Vani in Tamil films introduced her to Kannada cinema in 1973 for the film Kesarina Kamala. She recorded two songs in the film, which was immediately followed by her breakthrough song "Bhaavavemba Hoovu Arali" from the film Upasane (1974). This song cemented her position in Kannada films which lasted for three decades. After Vijaya Bhaskar gave her a career break, she was employed immediately by top-running composers such as G. K. Venkatesh, M. Ranga Rao, Rajan–Nagendra, Satyam, Upendra Kumar, T. G. Lingappa, L. Vaidyanathan and Hamsalekha. The combination of Puttanna Kanagal (director) - Vijaya Bhaskar - Vani Jairam produced many popular songs backed by strong female-centric themes. She modulated her voice and accent for the song "Happiest Moment" from the film Bili Hendthi (1975).

With her contemporary singer S. Janaki, Vani recorded few female duets, notably "Madhumasa Chandrama" (Vijaya Vani 1976) and "Teredide Mane O Baa Athithi" (Hosa Belaku 1982). She recorded many popular songs in the 1980s with the legendary actor-singer Dr. Rajkumar. Most of her duet songs in Kannada have been with Rajkumar, P. B. Srinivas, S. P. Balasubrahmanyam, P. Jayachandran and K. J. Yesudas. Some of her most memorable songs include "Ee Shatamanada Madari Hennu", "Besuge Besuge", "Belli Modave Elli Oduve", "Jeevana Sanjeevana", "Deva Mandiradalli", "Haadu Haleyadaadarenu", "Kannada Naadina Karavali", "Priyathama Karuneya Thoreya", "Sada Kannali Pranayada", "Endendu Ninnanu Marethu", "Hodeya Doora O Jothegara".

=== Odia cinema ===
Vani Jairam sang in many Odia films of 1970's and 1980's and became household name in Odisha. She recorded most songs with the films of music composer Prafulla Kar as well as in the films of Odia and Kannada composer Upendra Kumar. Some of her works in Odia cinema include mega hits like "Chhota E Ghara E Sansara" in Krushna Sudama (1975)," Mukunda Murari Hey Chakradhari"and "Jogire Khoju Kahin" in Mukti (1977),"Keun Nama Dhari" ,"Tuma Sadhira Ranga" and "Adine Malli Mahaka" in Sindura Bindu (1976)," Megha Barasila Tupuru Tupuru" and "Hayere Haye Garaje Megha" in Sesha Shrabana (1976), "Maa Go Mamatamayee Mata" and"Na Jaa Sajani" in Bandhu Mohanty (1977), "Mo Bhaina Bhaina" in Punarmilan (1977), "Ei Gaanra Maudamani", "Paichhi E Jibane" and "Ki Sundara Aha Ki Anandamaya" in Gouri (1978), "Aahe Dayamaya Biswa Bihari" ,"Holi Holi Re Holi " and "Chikilika Bambalika" in Balidana (1978),"Bhagya Mora Sate Ki", "Ei Jhiatira Pada Talamala" ,"Kuhu Kuhu Bane Kuhu "and "Hey Nagadeva" in Sati Anasuya (1978)," Aliali Kain Sunagori" and "Pirati Chori Chori" in Jay Maa Mangala (1980),"Dhali Dia Saraa" and Jhuli Jhuli Khele Doli" in Tapasya(1980), "Akhila Brahmanda Pati" and "Mo Manara Chadhei" in Ram Balaram (1980), "Aaha Sita" in Ramayan (1980), "Jhumi Jhumi Nupura Baje" in Hira Moti Manika (1980), "Nadire Nadire" ,"Tui Malmali" ,"Emiti Bi Nadi Achhi" and" Hip Hip Hurray Gadi Jae Gadire" in Pooja (1981), "Aha Ki Badhia" in Alibha Daga (1980). Her other films include Patipatni(1978), Pipasa(1978), Sita LavaKusha(1981), Debjani(1981) Astaraga (1982), Pratidhwani (1984), Para Jhia Ghara Bhangena (1985),Palataka(1985),Gruhalaxmi(1986) etc. For Devajani she has won Odisha State Film Award for Best Female Playback singer.

=== Other languages ===
Besides Hindi and South Indian languages, Vani Jairam has made recordings in Gujarati, Marathi, Marwari, Haryanvi, Bengali, Odia, English, Bhojpuri, Rajasthani, Badaga, Urdu, Sanskrit, Punjabi and Tulu 19 languages totally. She has been awarded many prestigious awards, among them Best Female Playback Singer for the states of Gujarat (1975), Tamil Nadu (1980) and Odisha (1984). One of her most famous Marathi songs, "Runanubandhachya", is a duet with the classical Hindustani singer Kumar Gandharva. This song was composed by Vani's mentor Vasant Desai for a Marathi drama called Dev Deenaghari Dhaavlaa. The lyrics were written by Bal Kolhatkar..

Jairam recorded "Holi Songs" and "Thumri Dadra & Bhajans" with Pandit Birju Maharaj. She also recorded "Gita Govindam" composed by Prafulla Kar with Odissi Guru Kelucharan Mohapatra playing the Pakhawaj. Jairam released "Murugan Songs" with songs written by her with music composed by her.

== Personal life ==
Vani was married into a family which supported music. Her mother-in-law, Padma Swaminathan, a social activist and Carnatic music singer, was the last surviving daughter of F. G. Natesa Iyer. N. Rajam is her sister-in-law. Her husband Jairam was a student of Pandit Ravi Shankar The couple did not have children. Jairam died on 24 September 2018, aged 80.

== Popularity ==
Jairam made her debut in Hindi film "Guddi", from which 'Bole re papihara' was a very big hit all over India. Overnight she became very popular.Previously her first song with Kumar Gandharva in Marathi also became hugely popular. Similarly, In Tamil her first song with msv 'malligai en mannan mayangum', in Malayalam 'Sourayudhathil' followed by Telugu, Kannada, Odia, Gujarati all became very big numbers. Her first song itself in all languages became very popular making her recognized by the state people as their own state singer.

Jairam is specially recognised for her unique voice and versality in singing all languages and all types of songs as the own language people and opted specially for difficult compositions. Some examples are "aanathineeyara" from Swathi Kiranam, "brochevarevarura" from Sankarabharanam, "yezhu Swarangalukkul" and "Kelviyin nayagane" from Apoorva Ragangal, "Kavithai kelungal", "kanchi kamachi", etc.

== Death ==
Vani died following a fall on 4 February 2023, at the age of 77. political leaders and music industry icons expressed their condolences. The Governor R. N. Ravi arrived at Jairam's residence and paid his last tribute.

== Awards ==
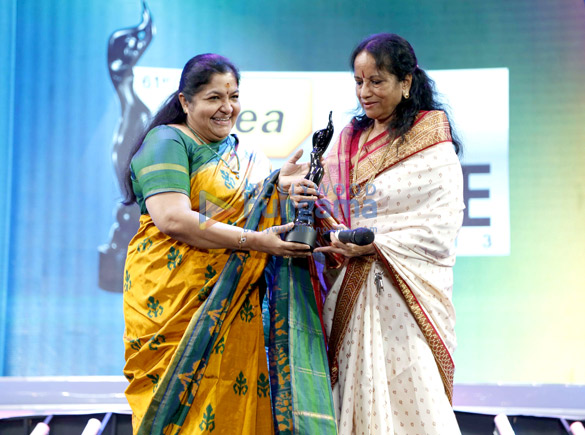
Vani Jayaram with K. S. Chithra at 61st film fare awards

The P. Suseela Trust honoured Vani Jairam at a function in Hyderabad, with a citation and a purse of one lakh. The event was widely covered on television. On 28 May 2014, Vani was felicitated in Bhubaneshwar for her contribution to Odia cinema. Preceding it was the PBS Puraskar Award in Hyderabad, instituted in memory of the inimitable P.B. Srinivas. On 30 July 2014, Yuva Kala Vahini, an organisation in Hyderabad, presented her with the 'Pride of Indian Music' Award.

=== National Honours ===
- 2023 - Padma Bhushan Award, Government of India

=== National Film Awards ===
- 1975 – Best Female Playback Singer Tamil– Various songs (Apoorva Raagangal)
- 1980 – Best Female Playback Singer Telugu– Various songs (Sankarabharanam)
- 1991 – Best Female Playback Singer Telugu – "Anathineeyara Hara" (Swathi Kiranam)

=== Filmfare Award ===
- 2015- Nominated for Filmfare Award for Best Female Playback Singer Malayalam – "Olanajali Kuruvi" - 1983 (2014 Malayalam Film)
- 2013– The 60th South Indian Filmfare Award for Lifetime Achievements
- 1980 – Filmfare Award for Best Female Playback Singer – "Mere Toh Giridhar Gopal" (Meera)

=== State awards ===
- 1972 – Gujarat State Film Award for Best Female Playback Singer – Ghoongat
- 1979 – Tamil Nadu State Film Award for Best Female Playback – Azhagae Unnai Aradhikkiren
- 1979 – Nandi Award for Best Female Playback Singer – Sankarabharanam
- 1982 – Odisha State Film Award for Best Singer – Debjani

=== Other awards ===
- 1972 – Mian Tansen Award Best Film Playback Singer of 'Classical Song' in Films for "Bol Re Papi Hara" given by Sur Singar Samsad, Mumbai.
- 1979 – Her songs in the Pandit Ravi Shankar scored film Meera brought her the Film World (1979) Cine Herald (1979) for "Mere To Giridhar Gopal".
- 1991 – Kalaimamani Award from Tamil Nadu State for her contribution to Tamil film music.
- 1992 – The youngest artist to be awarded the "Sangeet Peet Samman"
- 2004 – M.K. Thyagarajar Bhagavathar – Life Time Achievement Award from Tamil Nadu Government
- 2005 – Kamukara Award for her outstanding contribution to film music in general and in all the four South Indian languages in particular.
- 2006 – Mudhra Award of Excellence from Mudhra Academy, Chennai.
- 2012 – Subramanya Bharathi award for her contribution to music.
- 2014 - Life Time Achievement Award of Radio Mirchi given at Hyderabad on 16 August 2014
- 2014 - Asiavision Awards - Best Playback Singer Award for the song 'Olanjali Kuruvi' from the Film "1983'
- 2014 - Kannadasan Award by Kannadasan Kazagam, Coimbatore
- 2015 - Life Time Achievement Award from Raindropss on Women Achievers Award Ceremony Chennai.
- 2016 - Red fm Music awards 2016 for Best Duet with Yesudas
- 2017 - Vanitha Film Awards -Best singer
- 2017 - Ghantasala National Award
- 2017 - North American Film Awards - New York- 22 July 2017 - Best Female Playback Singer - Malayalam
- 2018 - M.S. Subbulakshmi Award given by Sankara Nethralya - Chennai - 27 January 2018
- 2018 - Pravasi Express Awards Singapore, Life Time Achievement Award - 14 July 2018.

=== Other titles ===
- 2004: Kamukara Award
- 2007: South Indian Meera
