= Naiyya =

- Directed by: Prashanta Nanda
- Starring: Prashanta Nanda, Zarina Wahab, Mohammad Mohsin
- Music by: Ravindra Jain
- Distributed by: Rajshri Productions
- Release date: 1979
- Country: India
- Language: Hindi

Naiyya is 1979 Hindi language drama movie directed by Prashanta Nanda and starring Prashanta Nanda himself and Zarina Wahab.

Naiyya is a remake of the successful Odia language movie Shesha Shrabana. The Odia movie is also directed by Prashanta Nanda, and starring himself and Mahaswata Roy.

== Plot ==
Sonu lives with his ailing mother in Lakhipur. He rescues Geeta, brings her home and looks after her, unaware of her background and where she comes from.

== Cast ==
- Prashanta Nanda as Sonu
- Baldev Khosa as Heera
- Zarina Wahab as Geeta
- Leela Mishra as Sonu's mother
- Dinesh Hingoo as Pannalal's assistant
- Amrish Puri as Pannalal
- Mohammad Mohsin as Kassim

== Songs ==
Ravindra Jain composed songs for this film.

- "O Goriya Re" – Yesudas
- "Beparwaa Bedardi" – Hemlata
- "Oonchi Neechi Lehron Ke" – Yesudas, Chorus
- "Mera Joban Bandha Rupaiya" – Hemlata
- "Geeta Raani" – Yesudas, Suresh Wadkar
