= Bandhu (2007 film) =

- DVD cover
- Directed by: Prashanta Nanda
- Written by: Prashanta Nanda
- Story by: Prashanta Nanda
- Produced by: Kusum Dhanuka
- Starring: See below
- Music by: Prashanta Nanda; Shanti Raj
- Distributed by: Eskay Movies
- Release date: 21 June 2007
- Country: India
- Language: Bengali

Bandhu (Bengali: বন্ধু) (English: Friend) is a 2007 Bengali action drama film directed by Prashanta Nanda and produced by Kusum Dhanuka. The film features actors Prosenjit Chatterjee and Swastika Mukherjee in the lead roles. The music of the film has been composed by Prashanta Nanda and Shanti Raj.

== Cast ==
- Prosenjit Chatterjee as Devshankar Roy
- Swastika Mukherjee as Aditi Roy ( née Chowdhury )
- Victor Banerjee
- Rajatava Dutta
- Soma Banerjee
- Dola Chowdhury
- Shyamal Dutta
- Nayana Das
- Tithi Bose

== Soundtrack ==
Bandhu

Soundtrack album by Prasanta Nanda & Anant Shantiraj
- Genre: Feature film soundtrack
- Length: 21:47
- Language: Bengali
- Label: Eskay Music

Official audio
- Bandhu – Full Album on YouTube

The music of the film has been composed by Prasanta Nanda & Anant Shantiraj .

The singers are Shaan, Shreya Ghosal, Kumar Sanu, Jojo and Sweta.

No.	Title	Singer(s)	Length
1.	"Katha Diye Chelo"	Shaan, Shreya Ghosal	4:25
2.	"Ogo Bondhu Amar"	Babul Supriyo, Sweta	4:13
3.	"Jhinuk Jhinuk Mukto Ache"	Shaan, Shreya Ghosal	4:42
4.	"Howrah Theke Shantragachi"	Jojo	3:38
5.	"Khabarder Hushier"	Kumar Sanu, Sweta	4:49
Total length:			21:47
