= Hisab Nikas =

- Directed by: Prashant Nanda
- Written by: Prashant Nanda
- Produced by: Prashant Nanda
- Starring: Prashant Nanda, Sriram Panda, Mahasweta Ray, Jharana Das, Biren Routray, Deepa Sahu.
- Music by: Prafulla Kar
- Release date: 1982
- Country: India
- Language: Odia

Hisab Nikas is an Odia film was released in 1982. It was produced, directed and written by Prashant Nanda and music was arranged by Prafulla Kar. The movie featured Prashant Nanda, Sriram Panda, Mahasweta Ray, Jharana Das, Biren Routray & Deepa Sahu. It was the first Cinemascope movie in Odia cinema history.
