= Sindura Bindu =

- Directed by: Sisir Misra
- Written by: Sisir Misra
- Produced by: Kedar Guru; Lokanath Guru; B. K. Agrawal; S. K. Agrawal; L. G. Patra
- Starring: Sriram Panda; Tripura Misra; Prashant Nanda; Sujata Anand; Ajit Das
- Cinematography: Dilip Dutta
- Edited by: Madan Gupte
- Music by: Prafulla Kar
- Production company: Mahalaxmi Films
- Distributed by: Progressive Films Productions
- Release date: 15 July 1976
- Running time: 153 min
- Country: India
- Language: Odia

Sindura Bindu is an Odia romantic love story released on 15 July 1976. This is the debut film of ace director Sisir Misra as director. The film is a gloomy tale of childhood lovers, who separate and unite at the end.

== Cast ==
- Sriram Panda... Akash
- Tripura Misra... Sandhya
- Prashant Nanda... Ajay
- Sujata Anand... Anita
- Ajit Das... Pratap
- Kedar Guru... Sadhu Baba
- Narendra Behera
- Shyamlendu Bhatacharjee
- Anima Pedini

== Soundtrack ==
The music for the film was composed by Prafulla Kar.

Song	Lyrics	Singer(s)
"Keun Nama Dhari Dakibu Tumaku"	Kalindi Charan Panigrahi	Pranab Patnaik
"Keun Nama Dhari Dakibu Tumaku"	Kalindi Charan Panigrahi	Vani Jayaram
"Adine Mali Mahaka Ke Kala Kuhuka"	Shibabrata Das	Vani Jayaram, Sudharama
"Jaubanaru Aparadha Tahinru Jaata"	Shibabrata Das	Pranab Patnaik, Sudharama
"Mo Priya Tharu Kie Adhika Sundara"	Prafulla Kar	Chita Ranjan Jena
"Najaa Radhika Eka Eka"	Shibabrata Das	Raghunath Panigrahi
"Tuma Saadhira Ranga Nakali Nakali"	Shibabrata Das	Chita Ranjan Jena, Vani Jairam
"Gulguli Gulguli Alei Khai Mo Malei"	Prafulla Kar	Prafulla Kar

== Box office ==
The film was a box office hit and celebrated Silver Jubilee week in various theaters.

== Awards ==
- Orissa State Film Awards 1976
  - Best Playback Singer (Male) - Pranab Patnaik
