= Bandhu Mohanty =

- Poster
- Directed by: Nitai Palit
- Written by: Nitai Palit
- Produced by: Dhiren Patnaik
- Starring: Gobind Tej, Shanti Swarup Misra, Dhira Biswal, Anita Das, Banaja Mohanty
- Edited by: Madhu Banerjee
- Music by: Prafulla Kar
- Production company: Priya Darshini Films
- Release date: 6 June 1977
- Running time: 172 minutes
- Country: India
- Language: Odia

Bandhu Mohanty (1977) is an Odia mythological film directed by Nitai Palit. Gopal Chotrai penned the dialogue of the film.

== Synopsis ==
Bandhu Mohanty is a devotee of Jagganath. He lives with his wife and children and maintains his livelihood by begging. When there is a famine in the village, he goes to Puri with his wife and children. Soon, they cannot find food anywhere. When his wife asks him to pray to end their starvation, Bandhu prays to god, who helps him. Jagganath listens to his devotee's prayers and asks Goddess Lakshmi to meet their needs.

== Cast ==
- Govind Tej ... Bandhu Mohanty
- Shanti Swaroop ... God Jaganath
- Dhira Biswal ... King Gajapati
- Anita Das ... Goddess Lakshmi
- Banaja Mohanty
- Lila Dulali
- Bhim Singh
- Biren Routrai
- Prafula Misra
- Sagarika

== Soundtrack ==
The music for the film is composed by Prafulla Kar. He was awarded as Best music composer for this film in Odisha State Film Awards

Song	Lyrics	Singer(s)
"Kanhi Gale Shyama Ghana E Ghana Kalare"	Prafulla Kar	Chitta Jena
"Chhada Chitta Chora Chhada Chhada"	Prafulla Kar	Vani Jayaram
"Na Jaa Sajani Pahini Rajani"	Prafulla Kar	Chitta Jena, Vani Jayaram
"Namaste Prabhu Jaganatha"	Prafulla Kar	Prafulla Kar
"Mahabahu Akhila Jagatnath"	Prafulla Kar	Chitta Jena

== Box office ==
The Film got success and became a hit.

== Awards ==
- Odisha State Film Awards 1977
  - Best Film
  - Best Director - Nitai Palit
  - Best Actor - Gobind Tej
  - Best Music Director - Prafulla Kar
