= Akshaya Mohanty =

Indian composer, singer and writer

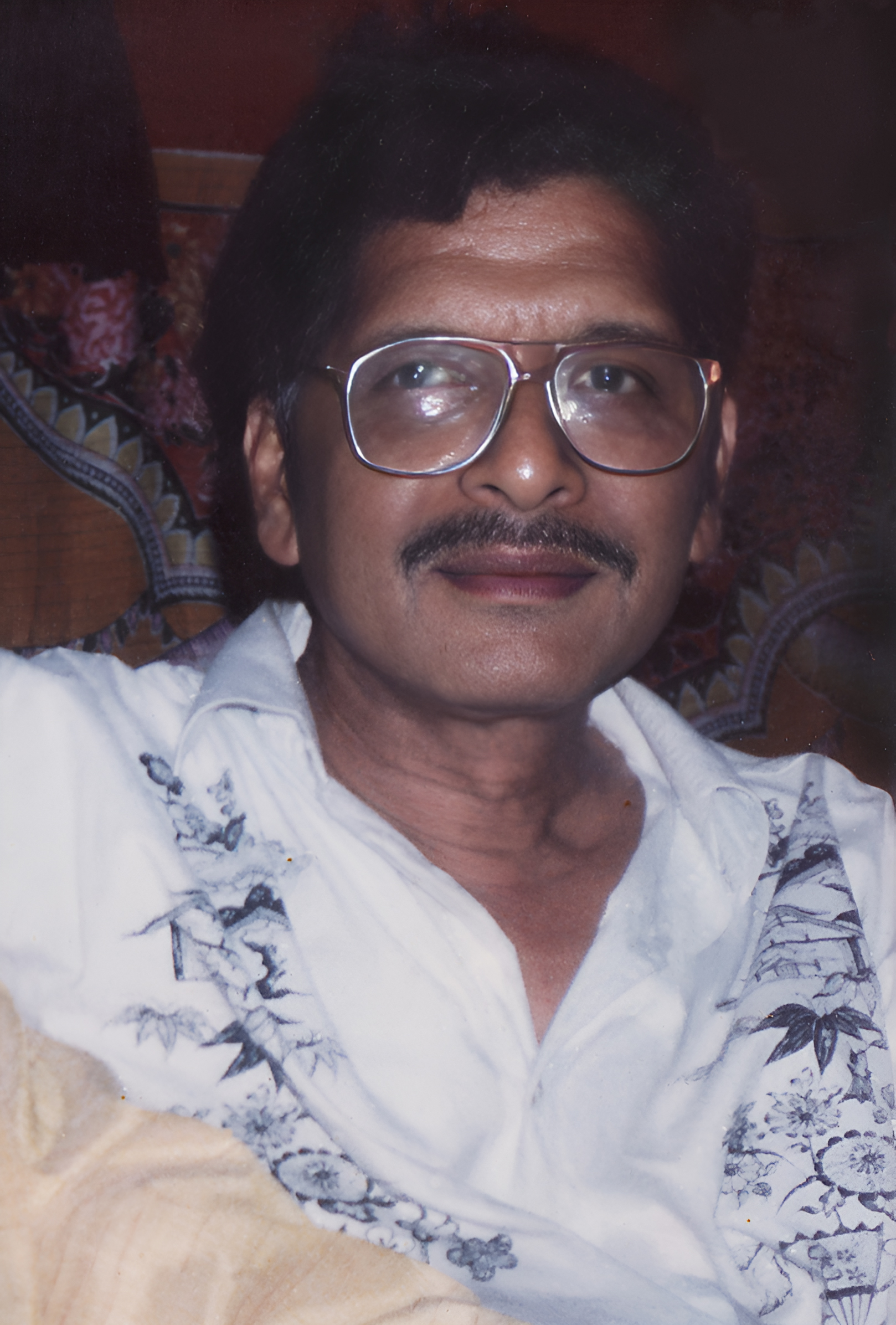
- Born: Akshaya Kumar Mohanty; 12 October 1937; Bankimundai, Cuttack (now Kendrapara) British India
- Died: 17 November 2002 (aged 66); Cuttack, Odisha, India
- Other name: Khoka Bhai
- Education: Stewart Science College; Ravenshaw College; Madhusudan Law College
- Occupations: Singer; songwriter; composer; music director; lyricist; writer
- Years active: 1956–2002
- Spouse: Prabina Mohanty (m. 1967)
- Children: 2 Sons & 3 Daughters
- Parents: Bichitrananda Mohanty; Subarna Manjari Mohanty
- Musical career
- Genres: Film scores; Folk music; Odissi music; Bhajan; Ballad Music; Non-film modern light songs; Playback Singing
- Labels: Saregama; T-Series (company)

Akshaya Mohanty, also known as Khoka Bhai, was an Indian singer, lyricist, composer, musician and writer in Odia. He has contributed Odia bhajans, Odissi songs, folk songs, film and non-film modern light songs in Odisha on contemporary themes and ballads based on popular legends in Odisha.

== Life history ==
=== Early life ===
Akshaya Mohanty was born to Bichitrananda Mohanty and Subarna Manjari Mohanty in a Karan family at Bankimundai village of Cuttack (now Kendrapara) on 12 October 1936. Mohanty had no formal training in music. At the age of 22 in 1956, he joined Government services in his home city Cuttack, but quit after seven years in 1963. He became an approved lyricist in All India Radio, Cuttack in 1956. By 1959 he became an approved composer in All India Radio.

=== Family ===
He was married to Prabina Mohanty in 1967. He has two sons and two daughters. His son Chitrabhanu Mohanty is a stage singer.

== Career ==
Akshaya recorded his first song Gadiala Bhai Dharichhi Sura Re in 50s. His first song as a playback singer was Gori Gori Gori in the 1959 Odia movie Maa. He has sung songs in 129 Odia films.

In 1965, he composed music for the movie Malajanha, directed by Odia filmmaker, Nitai Palit. A song from the movie Rakata Talamala went on to top the charts. He composed music for 75 movies. He has experimented with themes, words and in recording and producing special sound effects. Some of his experiments include starting a new cult of ballads in Odia, based on popular legends, such as Kanchi Abhijana, Randipua Ananta, and Konaraka Gatha. He also recorded a popular drama, Patent Medicine, that went on to win the best radio drama award from All India Radio. Some of his popular songs are 'Kene Gheni Jauchha Jagannathanku', 'Saata Daria Paare', 'He Phaguna Tume', 'Raja Jhia Sange', 'Rakata Tala Mala', 'Chakori Jhara'anaa Luha'. Akshaya Mohanty also has acted in 3 movies.

== As a music composer ==
He composed music in 75 films.

- Mala Janha
- Kie Kahar
- Sansar
- Jajabara
- Naga Phasa
- Taapoi
- Jhili Mili
- Nijhum Ratira Sathi
- Shree Jagannath
- Kie Jite Kie Hare
- Ashanta Graha
- Mahasati Sabitree
- Swapna Sagar
- Danda Balunga
- Jai Phula
- Jaga Hatare Pagha
- Sankha Sindura
- Mamata Mage Moola
- Nala Damayanti
- Baje Bainshi Nache Ghungura
- Chaka Bhaunree
- Sabu Mayare Baya
- Eai Aama Sanshara
- Karunamaya
- Badhu Nirupama
- Eai Ta Duniya
- Tunda Baida
- Jor Jar Mulak Taar
- Thilli Jhia Heli Bohu
- Suna Chadhei
- Kurukshetra
- Papa Punya
- Pua Mora Kala Thakura
- Mamata Ra Dori
- Chaka Akhi Sabu Dekhuchi
- Bidhira Bidhana
- Aasuchi Mo Kalia Suna
- Daiba Daudi
- Chaka Dola Karuchi Lila
- Thakura Achhanti Choubahaku
- Paradesi Chadhei
- Kalia Bharasa
- Ama Ghara Ama Sansar
- Hasa Luha Bhara Dunia
- To Binu Anya Gati Nahin
- Kotie Manisha Gotie Jaga
- Kapala Likhana
- Bhisma Pratigyan
- Suna Bhauja
- Rakhile Siba Mariba Kie
- Lakhsmana Rekha
- Pua Mora Jagatajita
- Jai Jagannatha

== Albums ==
- Ahuti (Original Motion Picture Soundtrack)
- All Time Greats Akshaya Mohanty
- Oriya Songs Akshaya Mohanty
- Ago Moro Phularani
- Songs From The Land Of Jagannath
- Jajabara
- Mo Pati Mo Debata
- Modern Oriya Songs - Akshyaya Mohanty
- Uttam Uttam (Remix)
- Modern Oriya Songs - Akshaya Mohanty
- Nyay Chakara - Kartabya
- Kapaala Likhana
- Pathara Khashila Bada Deularu
- Jai Jagannatha
- Danda Balunga
- Oriya Songs - Akshay Mohanty
- Sankhamandala
- Pardesi Chadhei - Jaa Debi Sarba Bhutedhu
- Jaga Hatare Pagha
- Mukti Tirtha
- Oriya Modern Songs - Akshay Mohanty
- Oriya Modern Songs
- Oriya Songs : Akshyaya Mohanty
- Maa Mati Mamata
- Devotional Songs By Akshaya Mohanty
- Jajabara Ory
- Paap Punya
- Kali Gori
- Suna Chadhei
- Oriya Devotional Songs - Akshaya Mohanty

== Popular songs ==
Light/Romantic

- Gadiala Bhai Dharichhi Sura Re
- Smruti Tume
- Bayasara Krushnachuda
- Tahun Kanji Gala
- Udi Udi Udi Ja Re Udi
- Ja Ja Re Bhasi Bhasi Ja
- Raja Jhia Sange
- Ba Ba Re Capital
- Punyara Nadi Tire
- Abujha Priyatama
- Nadira Nama Alasakanya
- Sabi Sabi Tu To Mora
- Alo Ratani
- He Faguna Tume Gala Pare Pare
- Nanda Mundia Driver
- Sakalara Gadi
- Bandhu Re Anide Anide Mote
- Baby Eka Gelha Jhia
- Gori Gori Gori
- Rakata Talamala
- Tik Tik Tik Ghanta Chale
- Ei Chumki (Duet)
- Rangabati Re Rangabati
- Abujha Priayatama
- Phulei Rani Saja Phula
- Jajabara Mana Mora
- Chhapi Chhapi Basanto Rati
- Rail Gadi Jauchhi Gadi
- Sata Daria Pari Re
- Chandrama Eka Chandana Bindu
- Chandramailli Hase
- Ae E E Alo Alo Mani
- Rati Je Khoje
- Ei rum Juhum Jhum Jhum Nupura
- Kalankita Ei Nayaka
- Hasa Ta Lakhye Tanka
- Sabi Sabi Tu Ta Mora
- Udigale Gendalia Jhadi Dela Para
- Boula Hebi Nahin
- Tu Ki Buli Baharilu Sahara
- Mathia Re Gote Kana
- Kali Gori Dihen Gadhei
- Thik Tori Pari Jhia Tie
- Jataka Padichhi

Bhajans (Devotional)

- Eka To Bhakata Jibana
- Kene Gheni Jauchha Jagannathanku
- Olata Brukhye Khelucchi
- Adhagadha Diankara
- Dasavatara (Gita Govinda)
- Srikrushnara Banshi Swana Suni
- Jaya Jaya Jagannatha
- Seta Bhakat Bhabare Bandhare

Popular Ballads

- Kanchi Abhijana
- Randipua Ananta
- Konarak Gatha

== Awards ==
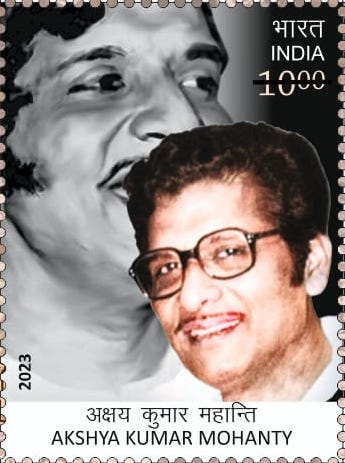
Mohanty on a 2023 stamp of India

- Jayadeva Award: The highest state award in movies
- State Award for best playback singer seven times
- State Award for best composer twice
- Many Awards from Orissa Cinecritic Association

== Writing ==
- Aneswata Rani (Collection of short stories)
- Bichara (Collection of short stories)
- Nagna Monalisa (Collection of short stories)
- Ba Ba Re America (Travelogue)
- Aryadasara Atmalipi (Semi-autobiographical)
- Aryadasara Sheshalipi (Semi-autobiographical)
- Bamapanthi (Novel)
- Aphera Nadi (Novel)
- Gayaka (Novel)
- Jaya Nuhen Jaya (Novel)
- Gotie Kuhu, Aneka Uhu (Novel)

== See also ==
- Sikandar Alam
- Prafulla Kar
- Bhikari Bal
- Aarti Mukherjee
- Sandhya Mukhopadhyay
- Vani Jairam
- S. Janaki
- K.S. Chithra
