= Harish Mahapatra =

Indian politician (died 2019)

Harish Chandra Mahapatra

West Bengal Legislative Assembly
- In office 1971–1977
- Preceded by: Dhananjoy Kar
- Succeeded by: Santosh Rana
- Constituency: Gopiballavpur

Personal details
- Born: 25 September 1935 Rohini Garh Zamidar Bari
- Died: 3 November 2019 (aged 84) The Rohini Garh Palace, his own residence
- Citizenship: India
- Party: Indian National Congress
- Spouse: Srimati Kalyani Mahapatra
- Children: Somnath Mahapatra, Susmita Misra, Subrata Mahapatra, Nandita Mahapatra
- Parent(s): Babu Nagendranath Mahapatra; Srimati Sailabala Debi
- Education: Presidency University, Calcutta

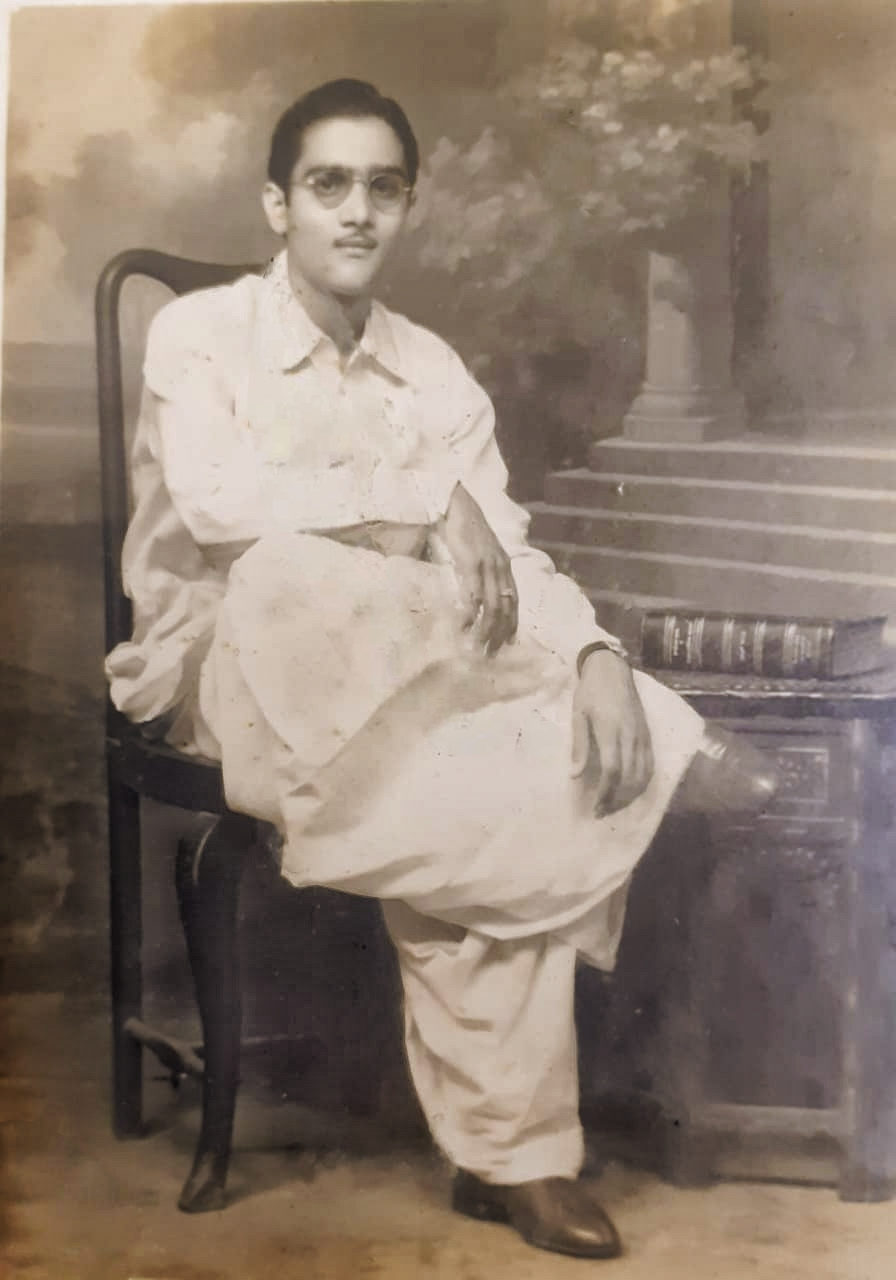
Harish Chandra Mahapatra in Presidency University(1952)

Harish Chandra Mahapatra was a zamindar, philanthropist and Indian politician belonging to Indian National Congress. He was elected twice as a legislator of the West Bengal Legislative Assembly. He was the grandson of Babu Chowdhury Lakhsmi Narayan Sharangi of Rohini Garh .

== Biography ==
Harish Chandra Mahapatra was born on 25 September 1935 in Rohini Garh Zamidar Bari. His maternal grandfather Zamindar Ch. Lakhsmi Narayan Sharangi had no sons. After Lakhsmi Narayan's death in 1949, Harish Chandra inheritaed his zamindari estates and properties. He was elected as a legislator of the West Bengal Legislative Assembly from Gopiballavpur in 1971. He was elected again in 1972. He was the secretary of Rohini CRD High School, founded by his grandfather. He served as the president of Ram Narayan Library of Ranjitpur. He was one of the founding members of Paschim Banga Bhumijibi Sangha. He along with his friend Birendra Bijoy Malladev(MLA of jhargram, son of Narasingha Malladev) worked very hard for the development of their constituencies.

Harish Chandra Mahapatra died on 3 November 2019.
