= Kalindi Charan Panigrahi =

Indian (Odia) writer (1901-1991)

- Born: 2 July 1901; Biswanathpur, Puri, India
- Died: 15 May 1991 (aged 89); Cuttack, Odisha, India
- Education: Ravenshaw College
- Children: Nandini Satpathy
- Relatives: Bhagabati Charan Panigrahi(brother)
- Writing career
- Language: Odia
- Period: Early 20th century
- Genres: Fiction, poetry and drama
- Notable work: Matira Manisha
- Notable awards: Padma Bhushan
- Literary movement: Sabuja Juga

Kalindi Charan Panigrahi (2 July 1901 – 15 May 1991) was a noted Odia poet, novelist, story writer, dramatist, and essayist. He is famous for his magnum opus Matira Manisha. He has been awarded Padma Bhushan and Sahitya Akademi award for contribution to Odia literature.

== Early life ==
Kalindi Charan was born on 2 July 1901 at Biswanathpur, Puri District. His father was Swapneswar Panigrahi and mother was Saraswati Panigrahi. His father was a lawyer and freedom fighter. He studied at Puri Zilla School. After completing high school he studied at Ravenshaw College, Cuttack. During which he started his literary career

== Literary life ==
While he was studying at Ravenshaw college he was founder of a club called "Nonsense Club". He along with his writer friends of the club published a handwritten magazine called “Abakash” which was later renamed to “Shakti Sadhana”. Kalindi Charana Panigrahi, younger brother, Bhagabati Charana Panigrahi, the founder of Marxist trend in Odisha, formed a group in 1920 called "Sabuja Samiti". Two of his writer friends Annada Shankar Ray and Baikuntha Patnaik were also members. They were influenced by the romantic thoughts of Rabindranath Tagore. The word 'sabuja' was inspired from the Bengali magazine Sabujpatra published by Pramatha Chaudhuri. This ushered in a short lived but influential movement in Odia literature called Sabuja Juga.During the life time of this movement, he wrote seven poems for ‘Sabuja Kabita’. His other important works are of the period were ‘Chhuritiye Loda’, ‘Mo Kabita’, ‘Kshyanika Satya’. During the 1930s the progressive Marxist movement was in full swing in Odia Literature.Sabuja movement later gave way to the progressive movement known in Odia as pragati age. Later Kalindi Charana Panigrahi wrote his famous novel Matira Manisha, being influenced by Gandhian thought.

He was for a period, the editor of English Journals, Bhanja Pradipa and Mayurbhanja Chronicle.

== Family ==
His eldest daughter Nandini Satpathy née Panigrahi was born in 1931, who later went on to become the Chief Minister of Odisha.

His younger brother Bhagabati Charana Panigrahi was the founder of Communist Party in Odisha. Bhagabati's great contribution for the Independence of India is underplayed in the history, because he was illegally imprisoned, and slow-poisoned by the British. His grandson Tathagata Satpathy is a politician and a newspaper owner who had been elected to the Parliament of India for four times. His great grandson Suparno Satpathy is a noted columnist, a political leader and an awarded social activist who is the incumbent Chairman of SNSMT as well as the Cidevant Chair of PMSA-Odisha, Government of India

== Awards and honours ==
He was honoured with the fellowship of Sahitya Academy in 1971. In the same year, he was honoured with Padma Bhushan by Government of India. In 1976, Sambalpur University conferred on him an honorary D.Litt. degree.

== Major works ==
His major works include:

- poems – Jadu Ghara, Puri Mandira, Mahadipa, Mo kabita, Manenahi, and Churitie Loda
- novels - ମାଟିର ମଣିଷ (Matira Manisha) (1934), ଲୁହାର ମଣିଷ (Luhara Manisha), ଅମରଚିତା (Amarachita),ଆଜିର ମଣିଷ (Aajira Manisha) and ମୁକ୍ତାଗଡର କ୍ଷୁଧା (Mukta Gadara Kshudha)
- short Stories – Devadashi, Rashi Phala, Shesha Rashmi, Sagarika, and "Mansha ra bilapa"
- dramas – Padmini and Pridarshi
- biographical works – Bhaktakabi Madhusudana, Karmabira Gauri Shankar and Jaha Ange Nibhaichi (autobiography)
- essays – Sahitya Samachara and Sahityika

The Odia film Matira Manisha (1966) directed by Mrinal Sen is based on his novel of same name.

== See also ==
- Odia literature
