= Annapurna Theatre =

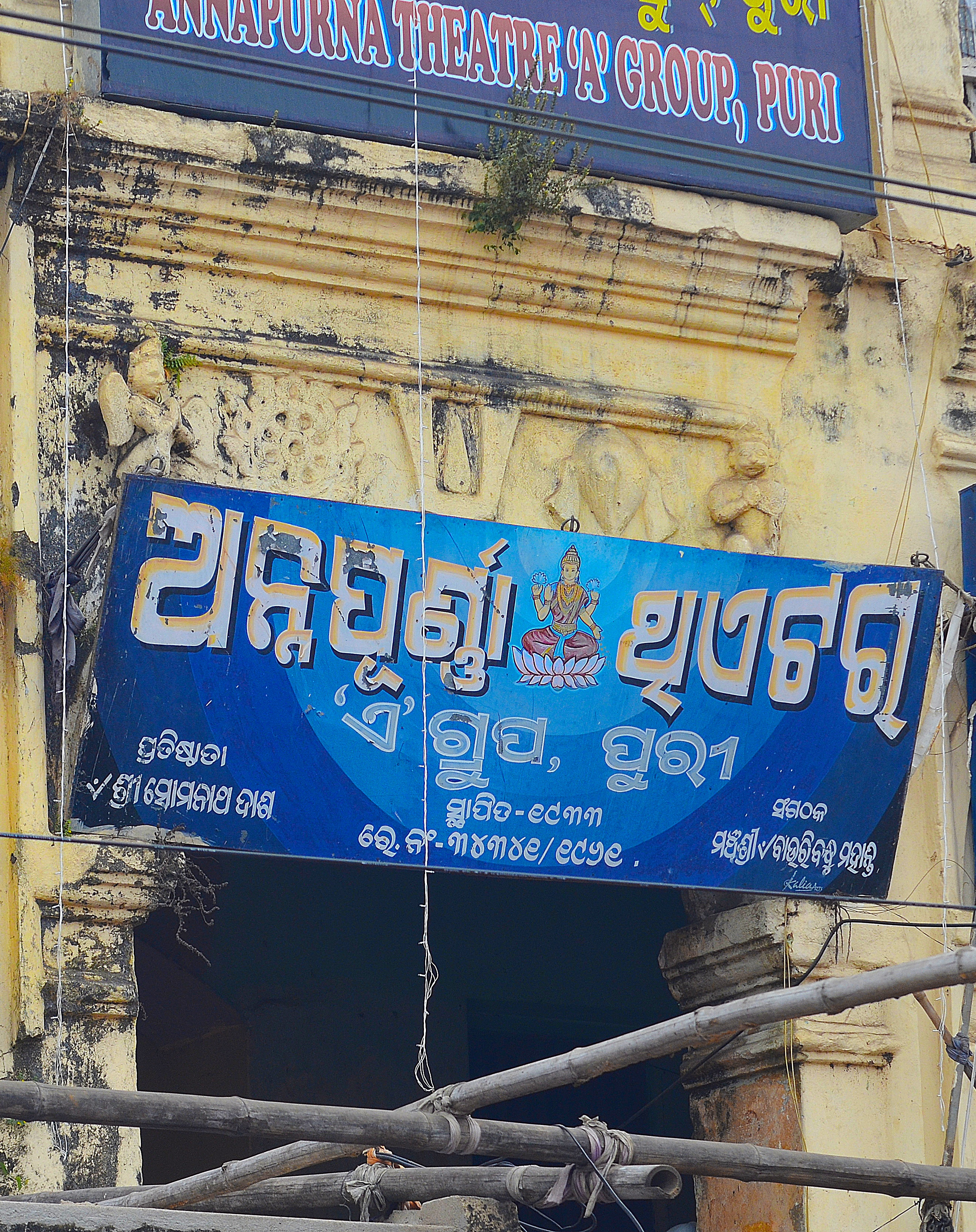
Facade of Annapurna Theatre facing Badadanda.

Annapurna Theatre is the pioneer of Odia Theatre Company.

== Formation ==
In 1933, Somnath Das formed Jayadurga Natya Mandali, an opera party in Khandualkote village in the undivided Puri district. A couple of years later, the organizers decided to switch over to theatre proper. By this time, a few artists from Banamali Art Theatre and Bauri Bandhu Mohanty, an able manager, had joined them. Mohanty had ample experience in the theatrical field. Within a short time he reconstituted the party and founded Annapurna Theatre in 1936. Within a very short time Annapurna Theatre became a touring troupe.

== Branching out ==
In 1939, Kartik Kumar Ghose translated P.W. D. that is a Bengali play into Odia and it was produced by Annapurna Theatre. Its success encouraged the organizers to march ahead. Later, Aswini Kumar Ghose wrote a number of works for them. As the number of artists increased, it was decided to divide the company into two branches. The A-group was stationed in Puri, headed by Mohanty, and the B-group in Cuttack, both on permanent stages. Ramchandra Mishra's Social Play, Manager, inaugurated the Cuttack theatre in 1945. Ties between the two groups were cordial in the primary phase. Even a third group, Annapurna-C was started for a short period. But, gradually, relations soured and the branches separated.

== End of Theatres ==
Managed by Lingaraj Nanda, Annapurna-B had its permanent stage at Tinkonia Bagicha in Cuttack. The building still stands at the place. Till 1968 at least five or six performance played in the Annapurna-B theatre annually. Dramatists like Ramchandra Mishra, Bhanja Kishore Patnaik, Kamal Lochan Mohanty, and Bijay Mishra were products of this playhouse. The A-group at Puri saw its own heyday, regularly touring for two months throughout the state. But, slowly, both companies lost their financial stability and decadence crept in owing to mismanagement. In between 1977-1988 under Rabindra Parija few plays were carried out and that was the golden period where eminent personalities like Hara Pattnaik, Mihir Das, Jayram Lenka, Brajraj Singh, Harish Mohanty, Chandi Parija, Padyumna Lenka, Suresh Bal, Pranab Kar etc. were born. Annapurna Theatre created a dramatic tradition and took a leading role in producing performers, playwrights, and other stage personalities. Both the theatres Annapurna (A&B) group were closed for short period of time, but now Annapurna Theatre B group has resumed functioning back with an agenda of carrying out of one play on 29th of each month.

== Notable performers ==
- Bhanumati Devi
