= Bijay Mishra =

Indian playwright (1936–2020)

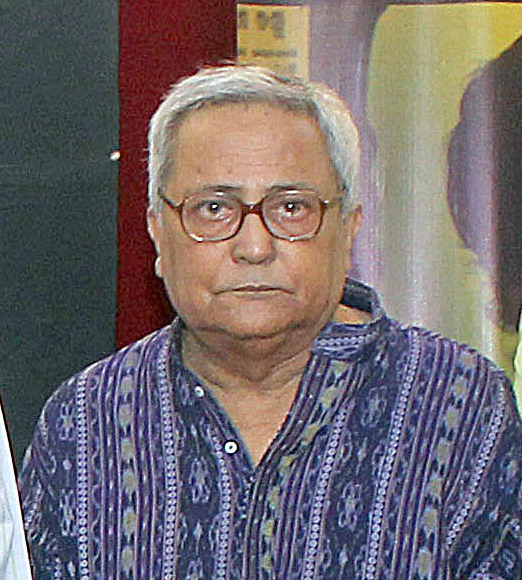
Bijay Mishra

Bijay Mishra (20 November 1936 – 26 April 2020) was a dramatist, lyricist and screenwriter from India. He was also a mainstream script writer in Odia Cinema & TV Industry. He was a recipient of the State Sahitya Academy Award (1968, 1988), Konark Samman (1994) as well as the Kendra Sangeet Natak Akademi Award and the Odisha Sahitya Akademi Award.

== Early life ==
Bijay Mishra was born in 1936 in Niligiri, Balasore, Odisha, India.

Starting as a playwright from the year 1960, his first play "JANANI" was staged in Annapurna Theatre, Cuttack, by a professional theatre group in the year 1960. One of the pioneers of the modern theatre movement in the state. A prolific scriptwriter of Odia Film and Television Industry, he was honored with the Think Foundation CSR Lifetime Achievement Award.

His play Tata Niranjana has been translated in Hindi, Nepali, Kannada and in several other Indian languages. This play has won a national award from All India Radio.

== Death ==
Bijay Mishra died on 26 April 2020.
