= Chilika Teerey =

1977 film

- Movie poster for Chilika Teerey
- Directed by: Biplab Roy Choudhury
- Produced by: Shyamghana Roy choudhury
- Starring: Bijay Mohanty; Tandra Roy; Sujata Anand; Netrananda Misra
- Music by: Shantunu Mahapatra
- Production company: Haragouri Films
- Release date: 1977
- Running time: 164 minutes
- Country: India
- Language: Odia

Chilika Teerey is a 1977 Indian Odia film directed by Biplab Roy Choudhury, story of an oppressed, illiterate fisher-folk, being swindled and kept in check by the business sharks and how they revolt.

== Plot ==
Near Chilika Lake, there is a cluster of villages inhabited by fisherfolk. They are exploited by the large fishing companies. Raghu, a revolutionary village youth leads the village to confront the fishing company. One fishing company manager Sricharan tries to demoralise and divide the unity of fisherfolk. But the revolution starts with pace. While Sricharan tries to escape from the scene, the villagers thrown him up in the Chilika Lake. Raghu, has a love interest with a village girl Padma, but he is not allowed to marry her as she belongs to another caste. At last, dejected Raghu hands over the revolution torch to Jadu and leaves with Padma rowing through lake Chilika in search of a new world.

== Cast ==
- Bijay Mohanty as Raghu
- Tandra Roy as Padma
- Netrananda Misra as Sricharan
- Hemanta Das as Jadu
- Sujata Anand
- Runu Bose
- Akshaya Mohanty Kashyap
- Preeti Patnaik
- Manju Pradhan
- Radharani

== Music ==
- Shantunu Mahapatra has arranged music for this film.

== Awards ==
- National Film Awards (1978) - Certificate of merit for best Odia film.
