= Prashanta Nanda =

Indian politician (born 1947)

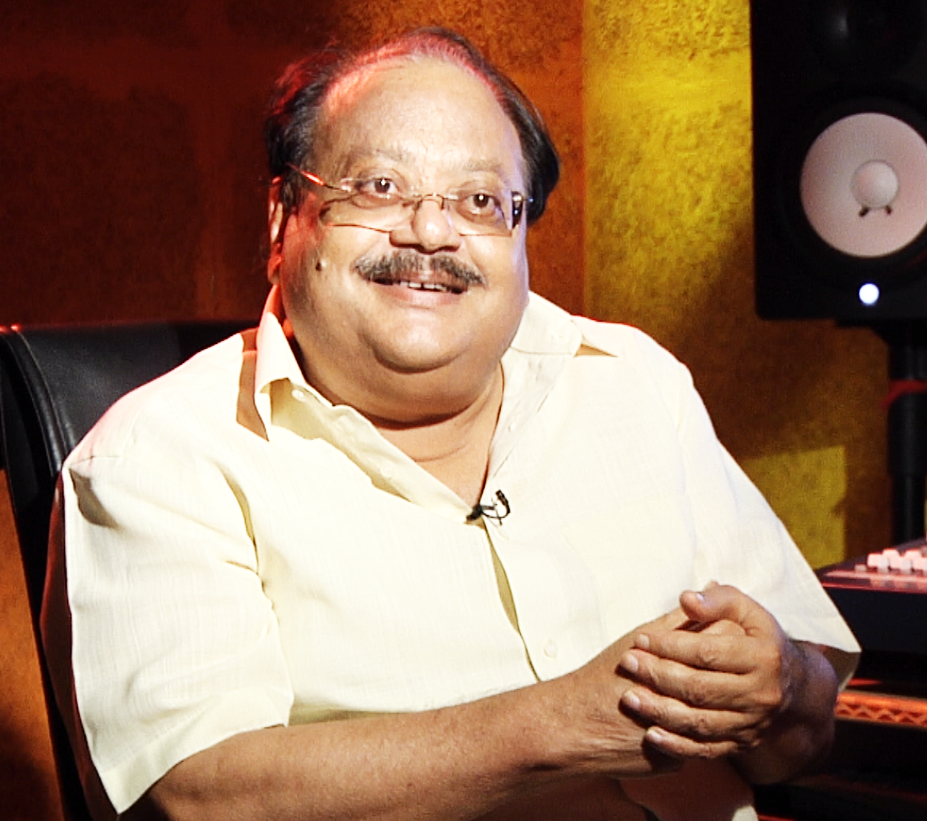
- Nanda in TeachAids interview, 2013

MP of Rajya Sabha for Odisha
- Incumbent
- Assumed office 4 April 2018
- Preceded by: Dilip Kumar Tirkey, BJD

Member: 12th and 14th Odisha Legislative Assembly
- In office 2009–2014
- Preceded by: Janaki Ballabh Patnaik
- Succeeded by: Prasanta Kumar Jagadev
- Constituency: Begunia
- In office 2000–2004
- Preceded by: Harihara Sahoo
- Succeeded by: Janaki Ballabh Patnaik
- Constituency: Begunia

Personal details
- Born: Prashanta Nanda; 2 May 1947 (age 79) Cuttack, Orissa, British India
- Party: Biju Janata Dal
- Other political affiliations: Nationalist Congress Party; Bharatiya Janata Party
- Spouse: Anupama Nanda
- Children: Rhishav Nanda
- Education: Ravenshaw Collegiate School; Ravenshaw College; Utkal University; Madhusudan Law College
- Occupation: Actor, director, screenplay writer, lyricist, playback singer, politician

Prashanta Nanda (born 2 May 1947) is an Indian director, actor and politician from the state of Odisha. He is currently a Member of Parliament at Rajya Sabha, the upper house of the Indian Parliament, for Odisha. He had worked predominantly in Odia film industry but also worked in Bengali film industry and Hindi film industry extensively. He was also a former minister in Odisha state.

== Early life ==
Prashanta Nanda was born in Cuttack, Odisha on 2 May 1947 to Kanchan and Jagannath Nanda.

He did his schooling from Ravenshaw Collegiate School. His B.Sc. from Ravenshaw College, M.A. and Ph.D from Utkal University, LL.B. from Madhusudan Law College, and have D.Litt. from MIT University, Pune.

From his childhood, he showed an interest in acting by participating in different dramas from his school days. He performed in a children's program named Sishu Sansar for Cuttack's All India Radio with the character named Bulu.

== Career ==
He started his acting career from early young age. While performing in a drama at Kala Vikash Kendra of Cuttack, Kaviraj Krushna Chandra Tripathy and Dhira Biswal choose him for the Odia movie Dasyu Ratnakar.

=== As actor ===
In 1962, he debuted as a lead actor with Odia movie Nua Bou. His three movies, Nua Bou (1962), Matira Manisha (1966) and Adina Megha (1970) got three times National Film Award for Best Feature Film in Odia within just eight years. He has worked under veteran directors like Prabhat Mukherjee, Mrinal Sen, Amit Maitra.

=== As director ===
At first he has given direction to 1975 Odia movie Mamata. But due to his young age, the producer suggested not to disclose his name. So he has given veteran actor Byomkesh Tripathy's name in the credits.

The 1976 movie Shesha Shrabana became his directorial debut in the industry, where the versatile actress Mahasweta Ray made her debut with the movie. Movies like, Shesha Shrabana, Hisab Nikas, Balidan, Swapna Sagara, Maa O Mamata, Dora are some of his milestone classics for Odia film industry.

While screening of his film Shesha Shrabana at IFFI, New Delhi, Tarachand Barjatya of Rajshri Productions, approached him to make the movie in Hindi. Subsequently, Nanda directed and acted as male lead in Naiyya released in the year 1979 alongside Zarina Wahab and the veteran actor Amrish Puri.

The whole shooting of the movie Naiyya was done in the bank of Mahanadi near Cuttack. The film's music was given by the legendary musician Ravindra Jain. He again collaborated with Rajshri Productions with movie Paheli. He has also given his direction in 1984 Hindi movie, Grahasthi starring Yogeeta Bali, Suresh Oberoi and Ashok Kumar.

The Odia movie Maa O Mamata, based on a short story written by him while he was in his 9th standard. His mother found out his story diary and showed to his father. They were worried about his future, because of the content of story written by a school going boy. For that they punished him.

Later, in 1980, Nanda made a movie named Maa O Mamata, where he was the lead actor along with Mahasweta Ray, Hemant Das and Anita Das. The movie was a blockbuster at that time. His father never saw his films, but by hearing a lot of appreciation from everyone's mouth, he asked him about the movie and showed interest to watch it. After watching the movie, he was surprised and asked where he found this kind of story. In reply, Prashanta said, the story was the same as what he had written in that diary in his childhood for which they had punished him and hid that diary. After that, his father got emotional with happiness and told him, As a parent, sometimes we behave more protective towards our children, and we never want our child to go the wrong way but it is difficult to find what talents our child has gifted by god.

While sharing the story of Maa O Mamata, Nanda has shared one of the songs Jane Radha Jane Meera and some parts of the film with the veteran Bollywood actor Raj Kapoor. Later, the song lyrics and theme of the movie Maa O Mamata reflects in his 1985 film Ram Teri Ganga Maili.

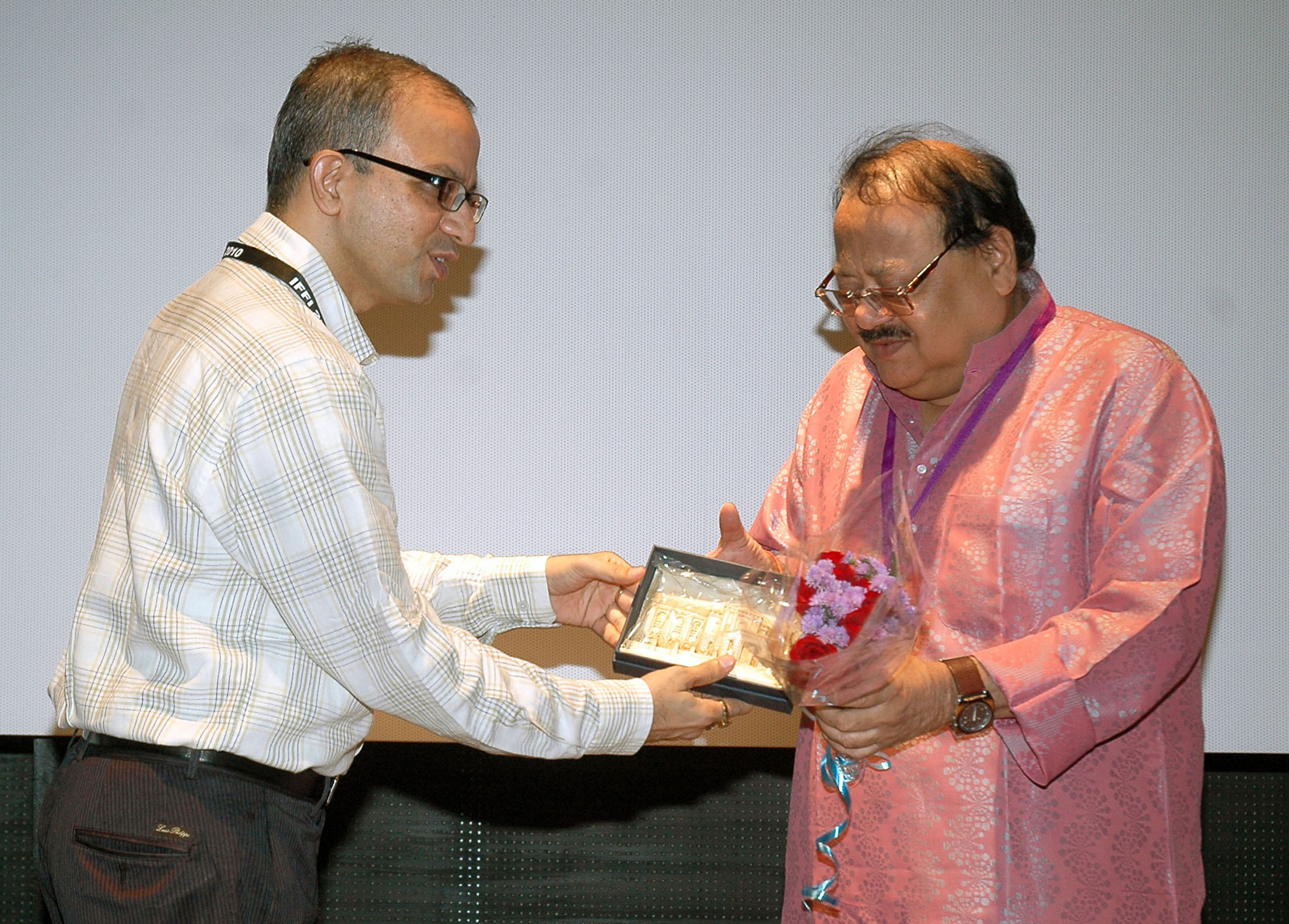
Prashanta Nanda, being felicitated at IFFI (2010)

In 2008, his film Jianta Bhoota was conferred Best Film on Environment Conservation/Preservation in 56th National Film Awards.

Actor-director duo Sidhant Mohapatra and Prashanta Nanda have given 8 all time blockbuster Movies to Ollywood.

In 2007, he awarded with the Lifetime achievement award in Odisha Filmfare Award.

=== As Politician ===
He was the Bharatiya Janata Party's (BJP) leader and Odisha state vice president. He resigned from his membership in August 2007. After that he joined the Nationalist Congress Party and then became a member of Biju Janata Dal.

== Charitable work ==
In 2013, it was announced that he had joined other Bollywood and international celebrities in the TeachAids initiative, a state-of-the-art approach to worldwide HIV prevention, developed at Stanford University.

== Filmography ==
=== As a director ===
Year	Film	Cast	Language	Ref.
2011	Thukul	Babushaan, Archita Sahu, Prakruti Mishra	Odia	
2009	Jianta Bhoota	Manoj Mishra, Rimjhim, Minaketan Das, George Tiadi	Odia	
2007	Bandhu	Prosenjit Chatterjee, Swastika Mukherjee, Victor Banerjee, Rajatava Dutta	Bengali	
2007	Kalishankar	Siddhanta Mahapatra Prosenjit Chatterjee, Anu Chowdhury, Swastika Mukherjee, Anubhav Mohanty, Victor Banerjee, Ashish Vidyarthi, Rajatava Dutta, Shankar Chakraborty	Odia, Bengali	
2002	Om Shanti Om	Siddhanta Mahapatra	Odia	
1994	Laal Paan Bibi	Chiranjeet, Satabdi Roy, Rituparna Sengupta, Ranjeet	Bengali	
	Ghara Sansar	Siddhanta Mahapatra	Odia	
1991	Maa		Odia	
1989	Jaa Devi Sarva Bhuteshu		Odia	
1989	Nyaya Chakra		Bengali	
1988	Lal Paan Bibi	Mahasweta Ray	Odia	
1987	Golamgiri	Prashanta Nanda, Mahasweta Ray	Odia	
1986	Bagula Baguli		Odia	
1986	Paka Kambal Pot Chhota	Prashanta Nanda, Mahasweta Ray, Uttam Mohanty, Aparajita Mohanty, Dukhiram Swain, Jayiram Samal|Odia		
1984	Dora	Prashanta Nanda, Mahasweta Ray	Odia	
1984	Grahasthi	Yogeeta Bali, Suresh Oberoi, Ashok Kumar	Hindi	
1984	Jaga Balia	Prashanta Nanda, Sriram Panda	Odia	
1983	Swapna Sagara	Prashanta Nanda, Mahasweta Ray, Dukhiram Swain, Anita Das, Sriram Panda	Odia	
1982	Hisab Nikas	Prashanta Nanda, Mahasweta Ray, Sriram Panda	Odia	
1981	Pooja		Odia	
1980	Maa o Mamata	Prashanta Nanda, Mahasweta Ray	Odia	
1979	Naiyya	Prashanta Nanda, Zarina Wahab, Amrish Puri, Leela Mishra	Hindi	
1978	Balidan	Prashanta Nanda, Dukhiram Swain	Odia	
1977	Paheli	Satyajeet, Durga Khote, Arun Govil, Leela Mishra, A. K. Hangal	Hindi	
1976	Shesha Shrabana	Prashanta Nanda, Mahasweta Ray, Dukhiram Swain	Odia	

=== Actor ===
- Ghara Sansara
- Mana Akasa
- Pooja
- Heera Neela
- Bagula Baguli
- Jaa Devi Sarva Bhuteshu
- Emiti Bhai Jagate Nahin
- Bohu Haba Emiti
- Bapa (1997)
- Panchu Pandav (1989)
- Laal Paan Bibi (1988)
- Golamgiri (1987)
- Paka Kambal Pot Chhota (1986)
- Jaga Balia (1984)
- Dora (1984)
- Swapna Sagara (1983)
- Hisab Nikaas (1982)
- Maa O Mamata (1980)
- Naiyya (1979) .... Sonu
- Balidan (1978)
- Naga Phasa (1977)
- Sindura Bindu (1976)
- Shesha Shrabana (1976) .... Sania
- Samaya (1975)
- Mamata (1975)
- Dharitri (1973)
- Adina Megha (1970) .... Suresh
- Matira Manisha (1966) .... Chakkadi
- Nua Bou (1960)

=== Music Director ===
- Ghara Sansara (1993)

== Recognition ==
- In 1962 his debut movie Nua Bou was awarded National Film Awards.
- FitFat Bioscope award, 2005
- Odisha Filmfare Award, 2015 (Lifetime achievement)
- Utkala Viswa Gaurab Samman 2025 By Odisha Society of United Kingdom
