= Jharana Das =

Indian actress (1945–2022)

- Born: 1945
- Died: 2 December 2022 (aged 76–77); Cuttack, Odisha, India
- Resting place: Cuttack
- Known for: Acting
- Notable work: Amada Bata; Malajahna; Sri Jagannath; Adina Megha; Abhinetri
- Awards: Jaydev Puraskar Award 1977; Guru Kelucharan Mohapatra Award 2016

Jharana Das (Odia: ଝରଣା ଦାସ, 1945 (Note: Most sources reported her age to be 77 and a 1945 birth date, but several reported that she was aged 82, though most of these did not include a date of birth making the ones that did the more likely source.) – 2 December 2022) was an Indian Ollywood actress and journalist. She was known for her contributions to the Odia film industry.

== Life and career ==
Jharana Das started her career in the 1960s as a child artist and announcer for All India Radio, Cuttack where she produced creative content across drama, song and film. She later also worked as an assistant station director of Doordarshan in Cuttack.

Times Now stated that Das "chose a career in the movies at a time when not many chose to walk the path" and reported that she had to deal with family opposition to follow her calling. Her brother, who was in the Indian Air Force, convinced their family to allow Jharana to pursue her choice. She had taken voice culture training in Kolkata which may have added a dimension to her performance in films.

When she switched to acting, she became well known for her performances in films such as Amadu Bata, Bari, Sri Jagannath, Adina Megha, and Abhinetri. Other roles include Hisab Nikas, Pujafula, Malajanha, and Heera Nella, for which she won many awards. Overall, she appeared in approximately 40 films as the female lead.

She was also credited for directing a biographical documentary film on Harekrushna Mahatab, a freedom fighter and former chief minister.

She was the winner of the Lifetime Contribution Award of Jaydev Puraskar in 1977 and a beneficiary of Guru Kelucharan Mahapatra Award for lifetime achievement in 2016.

She was also assistant station director of Doordarshan in Cuttack and a trained classical dancer.

Her husband was the cameraman on her film Malajanha.

== Death ==
Das died at her residence in Cuttack on 2 December 2022. Her death was recognized by the President of India, Draupadi Murmu. Odisha Chief Minister Naveen Patnaik also expressed grief over the death of the actress and announced that her last rites will be performed with full state honors. Patnaik said in a statement

Her impactful performance on stage and film will always be remembered. May her soul rest in peace and my condolence to the bereaved family

Union Education Minister Dharmendra Pradhan also gave condolences over Das's death.
