= Bhanumati Devi =

Indian actress (1934–2013)

- Born: 15 May 1934; Sittwe, Burma, British India
- Died: 4 January 2013 (aged 78); Puri, Odisha, India
- Occupation: Theater And Cinema Actress
- Years active: 1953–1987
- Spouse: Harihara Panda
- Children: Swarnalata
- Parent(s): Sarati Pattnaik; Pattadei
- Awards: Jayadeba Award

Bhanumati Devi (15 May 1934 – 4 January 2013) was an Indian film and theater actress who worked in the Odia film industry.

== Early life ==
Devi was born in British Burma on 15 May 1934. She moved to Puri, Odisha, India, with her Indian family following World War II.

== Career ==
Devi began acting in the theater in 1942 when she was just seven years old. Some of her best reviewed stage roles were in Lakhye Hira and Napahu Rati Namaru Pati’. Devi appeared at the Annapurna Theatre in Cuttack for more than forty years.

She made her film debut in 1954 in Amari Gann Jhia when she was nineteen years old. She was especially active in the Cinema of Odisha during the 1950s and 1960s. Devi's was cast in a lead role in more than a dozen Indian films. Some of her most prominent roles include her character, Harabou, in the 1966 Odia film, Matira Manisha, for which she won a National Film Award. Her last film was Jaydeb, which was released in 1986.

Devi was awarded the Sangeet Natak Akademi Award from the Sangeet Natak Akademi in 1985. In 2005, she received the Jaydev Award for Lifetime Achievement at the Odisha State Film Awards.

Bhanumati Devi died at her home on Red Cross Road in Puri, Odisha, India, on 4 January 2013, at the age of 78.
