= Naga Phasa =

- Movie poster for Naga Phasa
- Directed by: Basant Nayak
- Produced by: Brajaraj Movies
- Starring: Shriram Panda; Prashanta Nanda; Malvika Roy; Banaja Mohanty; Bijay Mohanty; Mohammad Mohsin; Gumansingh
- Music by: Akshya Mohanty
- Distributed by: Brajaraj Movies
- Release date: 5 November 1977
- Running time: 169 minutes
- Country: India
- Language: Odia

Naga Phasa is a 1977 Indian Odia film directed by Basant Nayak. The movie stars Shriram Panda, Prashanta Nanda, Malvika Roy, Mohammad Mohsin, Banaja Mohanty and Bijay Mohanty in the leading roles,Jairam Samal, Gumansingh and Nari in supporting roles.

== Music ==
Mo Kola To Jhulana To Aakhi Mo Aeena Singer(s) : Akshaya Mohanty & Trupti Das Lyricist : Music Director : Akshaya Mohanty

Bada Bedaradi Mo Naali Paan Raja ( Year : 1977 ) Singer(s) : Trupti Das & Geeta Patnaik Lyricist : Rajanikanta Nayak Music Director : Akshaya Mohanty

E Raati Pahiba Kebe E Pathara Kanhi Shesha ( Year : 1977 ) Singer(s) : Trupti Das Lyricist : Akshaya Mohanty Music Director : Akshaya Mohanty

Gaadi Chale Pachhei Debi ( Year : 1977 ) Singer(s) : Akshaya Mohanty & Trupti Das Lyricist : Akshaya Mohanty Music Director : Akshaya Mohanty

Je Dinu Paichhi Mo Priya ( Year : 1977 ) Singer(s) : Akshaya Mohanty & Trupti Das Lyricist : Debadas Chhotaray Music Director : Akshaya Mohanty

Nadi Phere Sagaraku Pakshi Phere Nide ( Year : 1977 ) Singer(s) : Akshaya Mohanty Lyricist : Akshaya Mohanty Music Director : Akshaya Mohanty

Tik Tik Tik Ghanta Chale ( Year : ) Film : Nagaphasa Singer(s) : Akshaya Mohanty Lyricist : Akshaya Mohanty Music Director : Akshaya Mohanty
