= Sipra Bose =

Sipra Bose (9 November 1945 – 22 April 2008) was a noted singer in the Hindustani classical music tradition from Kolkata, India.

== Works ==
She is noted for her rendering of light classical (Ragpradhan) songs in Bengali. Some of her notable songs in Classical are BINI SUTOY GANTHA MALA, ASI BOLE KANO, MON NA CHAILE, GANE GANE KEA GHUM, PRIYO TOMO KHOLO, JAO BHULE E ABHIMAN, JAMUNA KI BOLTE PARE etc . Latest hit albums like SUR SMARANE & BINI SUTOY GANTHA MALA.

She is more famous and popular and remembered by Bengali people because of her Bengali Modern Song . All the songs made a hit in that time and they are still remembered and sung by various artists in various programs. Some of her notable songs like AMARO BADOLO DIN, MONER DUAR KHULE KEA, BHALO BESHE BATHA SOHIBO, AHA MON KAMUN, O BASHI JANE, AHA KEA RANGO KORE GALO, E BHANGA BASANTA BELAY, AMAR SADA RONG TA NAO, OGO RIDHOY RATAN, KACHE ASAR MOTO, AMAR KOBAR MORON, SONO KOTHA AJI RATE, BATHA KICHU CHILO NA, AMI SUNECHI TAR CHARANDHANI etc are still remembered today.

She started her musical training under Chinmoy Lahiri, and was introduced into the Thumri and Ghazal of the Lucknow gharana under Begum Akhtar. She also worked with Naina Devi of the Benaras gharana and Pandit Ravi Shankar.

Her ghazal renditions, especially her enunciation of Urdu, has been noted by critics. She is also remembered in Odisha for singing some memorable Oriya movie songs and duets.

She was rare traditional compositions talim continued under Naina Devi of the Benaras gharana.

She enlightened many famous singers like Trisha Parui with her unique singing style.

== Death ==
She died from a heart attack in Kolkata on 22 April 2008. Her husband is Gobindo Bose, a noted Tabla player. They have two sons and one daughter. Their son, Somnath Bose is also a tabla player, and their daughter, Shubhangi Bose has worked in the music industry too. Their son Shivraj Bose is a business man and is the only sibling with a daughter, Ambika Bose who is pursuing law.

== See also ==
- Music of India
