= Nityananda Palit =

- Born: 8 March 1923; Cuttack
- Died: 26 July 1990 (aged 67); Cuttack (1990), Odisha.
- Resting place: Satichaura, Cuttack
- Other name: Nitai Palit
- Spouse: Sanjukta Palit (marriage 1956)
- Children: (6 daughters) Soma Palit, Samita Palit, Sharmila Palit, Sharbari Palit, Sarmistha Palit, Sonal Palit.
- Parent(s): Nagendranath Palit and Sarojini Devi

Nityananda Palit, known as Nitai Palit (8 March 1923 – 26 July 1990) was a playwright, actor and director. In 1965, he received the President's Award from Indira Gandhi for direction in his film Malajahna. This was the first Oriya film ever to be awarded the 'Silver Lotus' for direction and is still considered a classic.

== Filmography ==
- Kedar Gouri (1954) (actor and directed)
- Malajahna (1965) (screenplay and directed)
- Kie Kahara (1968) (written and directed)
- Krushna Sudama (1976) (produced and directed)
- Bandhu Mahanty (1977) (written and directed)
- Anurag (1980) (produced and directed)
- Kie Jite Kie Hare (1981) (directed)
