= Prafulla Kar =

Indian musician (1939–2022)

- ପ୍ରଫୁଲ୍ଲ କର
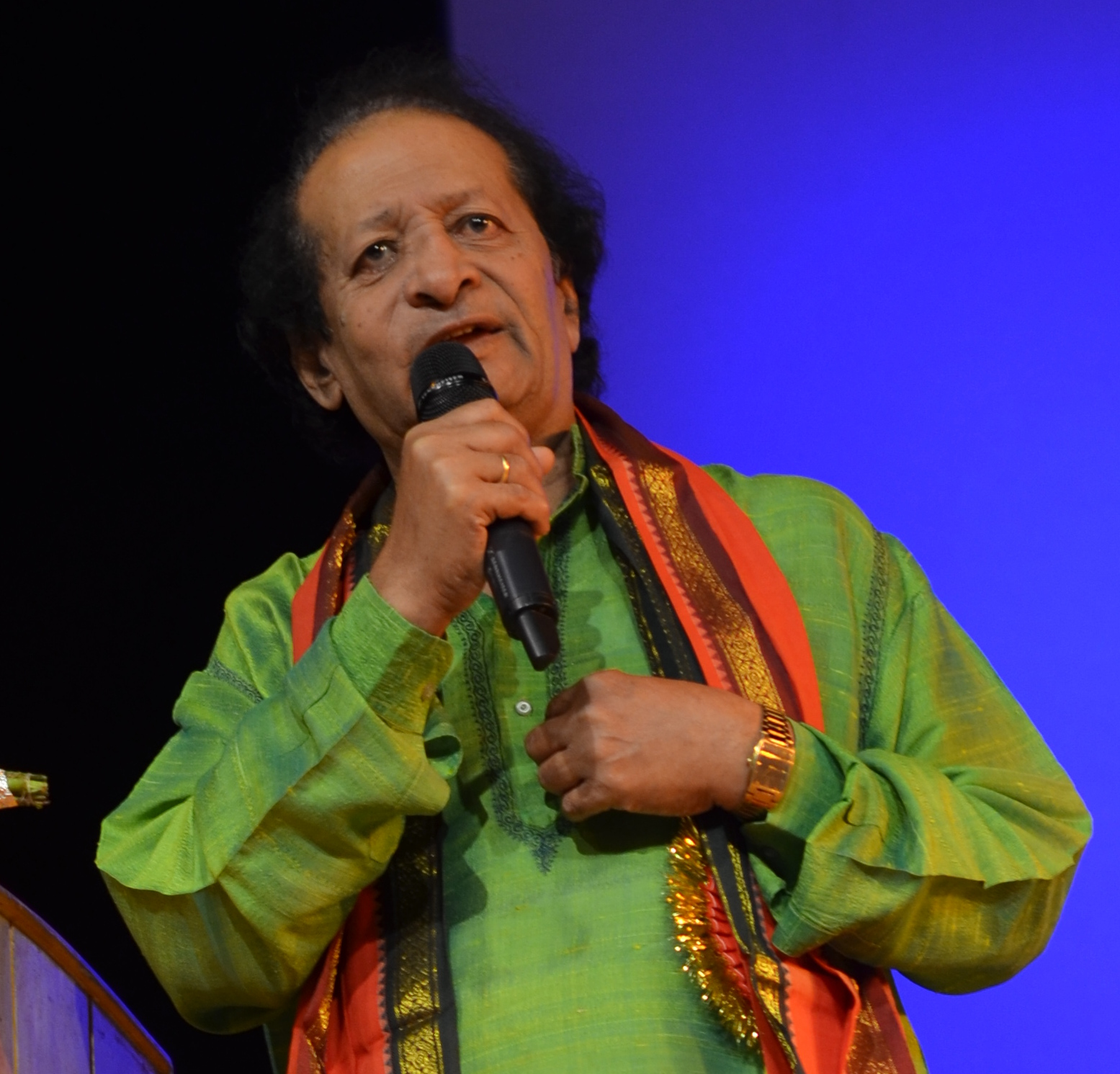
- Born: 16 February 1939; Puri, Orissa Province, British Raj
- Died: 17 April 2022 (aged 83); Bhubaneswar, Odisha, India
- Education: Graduate (Law), Sangeeta Bisharada
- Alma mater: Utkal University, Gandharba University
- Known for: Odia Singer and Music Director, Lyricist, Columnist, Writer
- Spouse: Manorama Kar
- Children: Mahaprasad Kar Sandhyadipa Kar Mahadeep Kar
- Parent(s): Baidyanath Kar; Sushila Kar
- Awards: Padma Shri

Signature
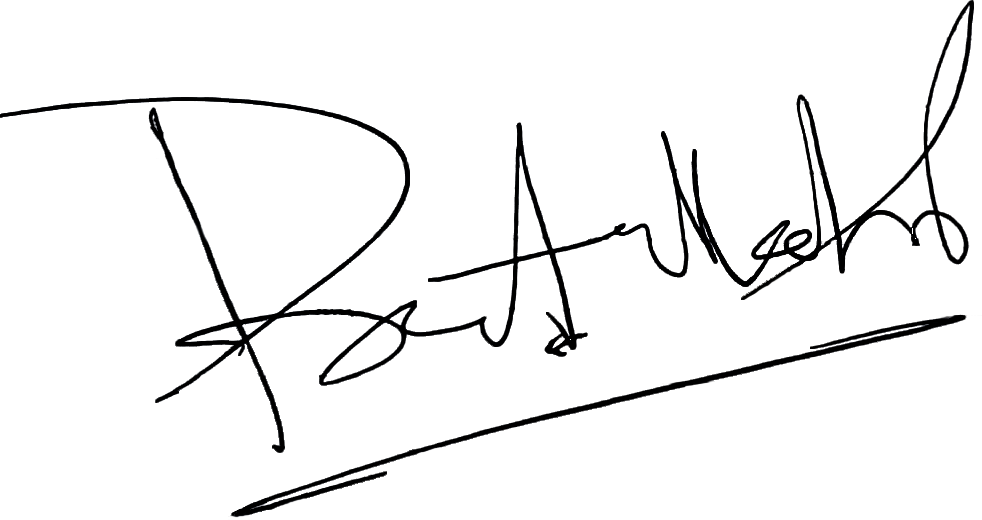

Prafulla Kar (16 February 1939 – 17 April 2022) was an Odia musician, singer, lyricist, writer and columnist. He was also famous for his Odissi Music recital. He received Padma Shri, the fourth highest civilian award by the Government of India in 2015 for his contribution in the field of arts.

== Early life and career ==
Born in 1939 into musician family in Puri, Orissa Province. His father is Baidyanath Kar and mother is Susila Kar. His uncle Khetra Mohan Kar was a tabla player. He was raised and brought up by his grandfather Bhagaban Misra and grandmother Apanna Devi because he lost his father at an early age. when student he was a part of AISF ( students wing of CPI) and as an artist he was an eminent part of IPTA, the cultural wing of CPI.

Prafulla Kar has worked as music director and often as singer in 70 Odia Films (Released and unreleased) as well as in 4 Bangla films.

== In popular culture ==
- 'Prafulla Kar Samman' awarded to different singers every year to celebrate his birthday in a two-day musical event. The award consists of a cash reward of Rs 1 lakh, a citation and a shawl.

== Awards ==
Year	Award	Event	Category	Source
2004	Jayadeva Award	Orissa State Film Awards	Music	
2008	Swarna Sanjibani Award		Music	
2009	Kabi Samrat Upendra Bhanja Award		Music	
2010	Balakrushna Das Award		Music	
2011	FitFat Biscope Award		Music	
2012	Kadambini Award		Music	
2012	Parampara Award		Music	
2013	Sahadev Padhi Award	11th Kumar Utsav	Music	
2015	Padma Shri		Arts	
2015	Sangeet Natak Akademi Award			
2016	D. Lit. (Utkal University)		Music	
2017	Choklate Legend Award	Choklate Music Awards	Music	
