= List of Odia films of 2013 =

This is a list of films produced by the Ollywood film industry in 2013.

== List of released films ==
Title	Director	Cast	Genre	Release date	Producer
ACP Sagarika	Biranchi Narayan Panda	Archita, Papu Pam Pam, Prakruti, Abhishek, Mihir Das	Action, romance	8 March	Dillip Dash
Ashok Samrat	Jyotee Dass	Arindam, Emili Chowdhury, Sunil Kumar, Megha Ghosh, Bijay Mohanty, Jayee, Hari, Tandra Ray	Romance, action, comedy	11 June	Annapurna Parida, Amaresh Parida, Biswa Ranjan Sahu
Bachelor	Mrutyunjay Sahu (Bapi)	Akhila Pattanaik, Utkantha, Bijay Mohanty, Tandra Roy, Pintu Nanda	Action, drama, romance	20 September	Mitali Madhumita
Badhu Nuhen Mu Bandhu	Chinmay Das Pattnaik	Bidusmita, Prabhas	Drama, romance	1 January	RCL Entertainment Creations
Chauka Chhaka	K Murali Krishna	Papu Pam Pam, Sambit, Lovely, Nutan, Sritam	Action, comedy, drama	24 March	Gayadhar Jena
Daha Balunga	Sudhakar Vasant	Babushaan Mohanty, Jackie Shroff, Ankeeta Mukherjee,Bijay Mohanty, Aparajita Mohanty, Tandra Ray	Action, romance	10 July	Pupinder Singh
Deewana Deewani	Ashok Pati	Babushaan Mohanty, Madhumita, Meenaketan, Mihir Das, Pintu Nanda and Runu Parija	Action, drama, romance	24 March	Pramod Swain, Shiba Prasad Dash
Dharma	S. Dilip Panda	Akash Dasnayak, Riya Dey, Ipsita Mohanty, Raimohan, Pintu Nanda	Action, drama	6 September	Prabhat Kumar Pradhan
Gadbad	Subhasish Pati	Siddhanta, Ashwini, Partha, Pritiraj, Minaketan, Jina and Ragini	Comedy, drama	29 November	Ajit Sahu, Subhasish Pati
Hari Om Hari	S. Dilip Panda	Siddhanta Mahapatra, Megha Ghosh, Akash, Riya Dey,	Action, romance	10 August	Sumit Rout, Sipra Das
Haata Dhari Chaaluthaa	Chandi Parija	Anubhav Mohanty, Barsha Priyadarshini, Debu Bose, Bijay Mohanty, Maheswata, Kuna Tripathy, Jaya, Runu, Pinky	Action, romance	14 June	Anubhav Mohanty, Anuprash Mohanty
Kaunri Kanya	Soumya Ranjan Sahu	Kavya, Payal, Soumya, Rehan, Ashutosh, Bighna, Ardhendu, Sudipta, Prakruti Mishra	Horror	27 September	Ramya Ranjan
Kehi Jane Bhala Lagere	Murali Krishna	Anubhav Mohanty, Barsha Priyadarshini	Action, drama, romance	17 October	Pradyumna Lenka
Love Hela Emiti	Lalit Kumar Tripathy	Somesh, Dimple, Ashok Das, Ilu Banerjee	Action, romance	1 February	S.M. Agrawal
Mita Basichi Mu Bhuta Sathire	Sanjay Nayak	Akash, Nikita, Dushmanta, Bijay Mohanty, Snigdha Mohanty, Akhil Patnaik, Biju Badjena	Action, drama, horror	20 September	Anam Charan Sahu, Bhabani Charan Rath
Mo Dil To Deewana	Alka Nanda		Romance	1 January	Alka Media Infotech
Mo Duniya Tu Hi Tu	Sudhakar Vasant	Anubhav Mohanty, Barsha Priyadarshini	Drama, romance	11 January	Soumya Ranjan Patnaik
Mu Ashiq Mu Awara	Muralidhar	Sunil Kumar, Megha Ghosh, Bijay Mohanty, Jayee, Hari, Tandra Ray	Action, drama, romance	8 February	Sukant Sahu
Mu Eka Tumara	Susant Mani	Sabyasachi Mishra, Archita Sahu, Mihir Das, Bijay Mohanty, Mahasweta Ray, Harihara Mohapatra, Usashi Mishra	Romance	14 June	Sitaram Agrawal
Mun Diwana To Pain	Manoranjan Pal	Bulu, Jyoti Pani	Romance	2 August	Debendra Nath Sahu
Mun Raja Tu Rani	Sudhansu Mohan Sahu	Arindam Roy, Sambhavana Mohanty, Manoj Mishra, Siddhanta, Hari, Anita Das	Drama, romance	14 October	Atish Rout
My Love Story	Deepak Panda	Deepak Panda, Katrine Kovi, Mihir Das, Minaketan	Action, romance	1 March	Sunil Singh
Nai Separi Kanaka Gori	Pankaj Pani	Partha, Rali Nanda, Pritiraj, Roji, Samaresh, Minaketan	Drama, romance	1 March	Ajay Mohanty
Omm Sai Tujhe Salam	Biswajit Mohanty	Ansuman, Puja, Bhagyalaxmi, Dipak, Prasanna Patsani	Devoutness	30 August	Sudha Patnaik, Kali Prasanna Satpathy
Paribeni Kehi Alaga Kari	Sudhanshu Sahu	Arindam Roy, Priya Choudhury	Action, romance	11 January	Sitaram Agrawal
Prema Sabuthu Balaban	Arun Mohanty	Dusmanta, Barsha, Sidhant, Mihir, Uttam, Aparajita, Hara Patnaik, Pradyumna Lenka	Drama	17 May	Meena Mohanty
Premika	Shibu Mohanty	Rudra, Bulu, Prakruti Mishra, Sonali (Bengali)	Romance	30 August	Bijay Behera
Rudra	Jitu Rout	Anant, Madhu, Babu Pradhan, Braja	Action, drama	17 May	Rudra Narayan Mishra, Nimai Biswal
Rumku Jhumana	Tapas Sargharia	Hari, Soujanya, Bhumika, Priya, Mihir Das,	Comedy, drama	19 April	Ramachandra Pradhan
Salam Cinema	Nishikanta Dalabehera	Sambit Acharya, Bobby Mishra, Debjani	Drama	17 May	Sunanda Das, Nilakantha Das
Sandehi Priyatama	Sudhansu Sekhar Mallick	Kajal, Titu	Drama, romance	13 December	Narayan Ghadei
Sapanara Nayika	Raj Pradeep	Deepak, Pinky Priyadarshini, Sritam, Daitari Panda, Manoj Mishra	Romance	24 May	Rabindra Panda
Superstar	Barada Prasanna Tripathy	Ansuman, Sonam, Rali Nanda, Mahasweta, Mihir Das	Drama	12 May	Debanand Panda, Sampurnanand Panda
Tanka Tate Salam	Sudhansu Sekhar	Chandan Kar, Rali Nanda	Action, drama, romance	27 September	V. Rajkumar Raju
Target	S.K. Muralidharan	Amlan, Jhilik, Mihir Das, Aparajita, Mahasweta, Minaketan	Action, drama	12 April	Niranjan Rana
Tu Mo Dehara Chhai	Chandi Parija	Amlan Das, Riya Dey, Shilpa Dey, Siddhanta, Mihir Das, Minaketan, Samaresh, Salil	Action, drama, romance	15 October	Sunil Rout
Tu Mo Suna Tu Mo Heera	Rajeev Mohanty	Bobby Mishra, Priyanka Haldar	Romance	1 January	Jyoti Productions
