= List of Odia films of the 2010s =

A list of films produced by the Ollywood film industry based in Bhubaneswar and Cuttack in the 2010s:

Release date	Title	Director	Cast	Note
2010
	Diwana	Ashok Pati	Barsa Priyadarshini, Anubhav Mohanty, Samaresh, Bijay Mohanty, Pintu Nanda, Mihir Das	
	Don	Sudhanshu Sahu	Siddhanta Mahapatra, Anubhav Mohanty, Aurosmitha, Bijay Mohanty, Uttam Mohanty, Anita Das	
	Tora More Jodi Sundara	Debu Pattnaik	Sabyasachi Misra, Arpita Mukherjee, Archita Sahu, Bijay Mohanty, Mihir Das, Pintu Nanda	
	Swayamsiddha	Sudhanshu Sahu	Siddhanta Mahapatra, Sunil Kumar, Yukta, Aparajita Mohanty, Anita Das, Pradyumna Lenka	
	Megha Sabari Re Asiba Pheri	Sanjay Nayak	Sabyasachi Misra, Priya, Minaketan, Bijay Mohanty, Kuna Tripathy, Akhila Patnaik	
	Sasura Ghara Zindabad	Sanjay Nayak	Sabyasachi Misra, Megha Ghosh, Pushpa Panda, Bijay Mohanty, Hadu, Arabinda	
	Pahili Raja	Tapas Sargharia	Siddhanta Mahapatra, Anu Chowdhury, Debasis, Mihir Das, Minaketan, Jairam Samala	
	Dil Tate Deichi	Sanjay Nayak	Sabyasachi Misra, Priya, Mihir Das, Harihara Mahapatra	
	Sanju Aau Sanjana	Ashok Pati	Babushaan Mohanty, Parijaat, Mihir Das, Usasi Misra, Pintu Nanda, Samaresh	
	Tu Thile Mo Dara Kahaku	Dilip Panda	Mahashweta Roy, Budhaditya, Rali Nanda, Barsa Priyadarshini, Bijay Mohanty, Raimohan	
	Aama Bhitare Kichhi Achhi	Sushant Mani	Shreya Gangooli, Anubhav Mohanty, Gloria Mahanty, Ajit Das, Anita Das, Barsa Priyadarshini	
	Aalo Mora Kandhei	Himanshu Parija	Akash Das Nayak, Siddhanta Mahapatra, Archita Sahu, Priya, Anita Das, Mihir Das	
	Prema Adhei Akshyara	Sudhakar Basanta	Babushaan Mohanty, Riya Dey, Mihir Das, Bijay Mohanty, Harihara Mahapatra, Samaresh	
	Mu Kana Ete Kharap	Basant Sahu	Anubhav Mohanty, Arpita Mukherjee, Mihir Das, Bijay Mohanty, Minaketan, Satyaki Misra	
	Ae Milana Juga Jugara	Ashok Kumar	Rajdeep, Elle, Pushpa Panda, Chandan Kar, Minaketan, Nupura Ghosh	
	Aakhi Palakare Tu	Rabindra Pradhan	Sabyasachi Misra, Babli, Mukesh Rishi, Harihara Mahapatra	
	Tate Bhala Pauchi Boli	Prashant Kumar	Bobby Mishra, Koel Mukherjee, Aparajita Mohanty, Mihir Das, Jairam Samal, Kuna Tripathy	
	To Akhire Mun	S.K. Muralidharan	Babushaan Mohanty, Sweety, Namrta Das, BHara Patnaik	
	Subha Vivaha	Jyotiprakash Das	Akash Das Nayak, Barsa Priyadarshini, Pupinder Singh, Aparajita Mohanty, Jairam Samal, Tandra Roy	
	Bhul Bujhibani Mate	Kunal Patnaik	Debasis, Amelie Panda, Pintu Nanda, Aparajita Mohanty, Mihir Das, Ajit Das	
	Anjali	Biswa Bhusan Mohapatra	Aditya, Sampurna Chakraborty, Deabasmitha, Raj	
	Asibu Kebe Saji Mo Rani	Manaranjan Pal	Akash Das Nayak, Khushi Garvi, Raimohan, Mihir Das	
	Om Namaha Shivaya	Rabindra Pradhan	Bablu, Rali Nanda, Anita Das, Bijay Mohanty	
2011
14 January	Loafer	Ashok Pati	Babushaan Mohanty, Archita Sahu, Mihir Das, Budhaditya, Samaresh, Aparajita Mohanty, Jiban Panda, Minaketan, Priyanka, Lovely	Remake of Telugu Movie Happy
14 January	Most Wanted	Susant Mani	Anubhav Mohanty, Megha Ghosh	
14 January	Chatire Lekhichi Tori Naa	Sanjay Nayak	Sabyasachi Misra, Barsa Priyadarshini	
25 February	Mana Mora Prajapati	Anama Charana Sahoo	Deepak, Koel BanarjeeMihir Das	
11 March	Tu Mo Girlfriend	Avtar Singh	Arindam Roy, Rupalekha	
18 March	E Mana Khoje Mana Tiye	Ranjan Misra	Sunil Kumar, Tanmay MisraPriya, Roopali	
3 April	Mate Bohu Kari Nei Jaa	Choudhary Bikash Das	Siddhanta Mahapatra, Aparajita Mohanty, Mihir Das, Pushpa Panda, Ashrumochan Mohanty, Aishwarya Pathy, Malavika Bhhatacharya	
29 April	Hero - Prema Katha	Dilip Panda	Arindam Roy, Mihir Das, Priya, Chandan Kar	
6 May	Tora mora katha heba chup chap	Rudra Narayan Mohanty	Swaraj, Dilip Tarki, Jyoti, Ashrumochan Mohanty	
