= List of Odia films of 2022 =

This is a list of Odia films that are scheduled to release in 2022.

List of Odia films produced in the Ollywood in India that are released in the year 2022.

== Jan–Mar ==
| Opening | | Title | Director | Cast | Production Company & OTT |
|---|---|---|---|---|---|
| J A N U A R Y | 2 | Sahani Ghara Kahani | Niranjana Behera | Mahasweta Ray, Bulu Das, Lipsa Mishra, Pintu Nanda, Jiban Panda | Lipsa Mishra Productions and Zee Sarthak |
| J A N U A R Y | 13 | Bhija Matira Swarga | Manmohan Mohapatra | Mihir Das, Bijayanee Mishra, Gargi Mohanty, Mahesh Bhol, Jyoti Ranjan Nayak, Saroj Das, Preetiranjan Das | Akshaya Parija Productions and Kanccha Lannka |
| J A N U A R Y | 16 | Anamika Naika | Ashok Pati | Elina Samantray, Debashish Patra, Priya Choudhury | Zee Sarthak Films and Zee Sarthak |
| J A N U A R Y | 21 | Hau Hau Heigalare | Ramesh Rout | Raj Rajesh, Riya Dey, Pintu Nanda, Sasmita Pradhan, Akshaya Bastia, Shweta Acharya, Subhashree, Rani Panda, Tukuna, Nilamani sahoo, Pooja, Sachin | Subash Das, Nilamani Saho and Kanccha Lannka |
| J A N U A R Y | 28 | Four | Abhishek Swain | Satya Ranjan, Prasanjeet Mohapatra, Swastik Choudhury, Rhea Resham Bari, Ashwini Ray Mohapatra, Nitya Prakash Swain, Kalkee Krushna | Kaustubh DreamWorks and AAO NXT |
| J A N U A R Y | 28 | Samapaju Ra Raghu | Chinmay Mishra | Manoj Mishra, Suryamayee Mohapatra, Partha Sarathi Ray, Debjani Deghuria, Mamta Nanda, Astha, Ratan Meher, Angel | Manoj Mishra Films and Tarang Cine Productions and Tarang Plus |
| F E B R U A R Y | 4 | Mr.Kanheiya | Ramesh Rout | Papu Pom Pom, Jhilik Bhattacharya, Pradyumna Lenka, Tukuna | Sidharth Movies and Sidharth TV |
| F E B R U A R Y | 6 | Krazzy-4 | Samraj | Avisekh Rath, Suryamayee Mishra, Subhasish Sharma, Uttam Mohanty, Pragyan Khatua, Pintu Nanda | Iye Focus Presents Pvt. Ltd. and Zee Sarthak |
| F E B R U A R Y | 13 | Adha Lekha Gapa | Sudhanshu Mohan Sahoo | Abhishek Giri, Arlin Ankita, Satwik Mishra, Madhumita Mohanty, Pradyumna Lenka, Choudhury Bikash Das, Ananta Mishra, Devi Barik, Aishwariya, Bijaylaxmi | Pradyumna Lenka, Tarang Cine Productions and Tarang Plus |
| F E B R U A R Y | 13 | Kurukhetra | Aswin Tripathy | Akash Dasnayak, Tamanna Vyas, Samaresh Routray, Pintu Nanda, Pradyumna Lenka, Ilu Bannerjee | Kshirod Pattanayak, Zee Sarthak Films and Zee Sarthak |
| M A R C H | 4 | Mana Mora Kagaja Gudi | Debajyoti Patra | Bhoomika Dash, Rakesh Deo, Pritiraj Satpathy, Chaudhuri Jayaprakash Das | Sumitra Entertainment |
| M A R C H | 6 | Lagaam | Pinu Nayak | Amlan Das, Tamanna Vyas, Bobby Mishra, Harihara Mahapatra, Pradyumna Lenka | Deepti Kiran Films, Tarang Cine Productions and Tarang Plus |
| M A R C H | 20 | Panigrahana | Himanshu (Chandi) Parija | Avisekh Rath, Suryamayee Mohapatra, Mahasweta Ray, Prithviraj Nayak, Pradyumna Lenka | Zee Sarthak Films and Zee Sarthak |

== Apr–Jun ==
| Opening | | Title | Director | Cast | Production Company & OTT | Ref. |
|---|---|---|---|---|---|---|
| A P R I L | 3 | Sunayana | Mrityunjaya Sahoo | Rishi, Jagruti, Tribhuban Panda, Bhupati Tripathy, Saroj Das, Rajesh Panda, Manini Nanda, Sushil Mishra, Bhabani | Tarang Cine Productions, Tarang Plus | |
| A P R I L | 17 | Didi Namaskar | Mrityunjaya Sahoo | Sheetal Patra, Saswat, Pintu Nanda, Soma Bhowmik, Priyanka Mohapatra | Ankita Cine Productions / Zee Sarthak Films and Zee Sarthak | |
| M A Y | 1 | Jatha Rabansya Mandodari | Pinu Nayak | Deepak Barik, Lipika Senapti, Choudhury Jayprakash Das, Rakhi, Subhransu, Alaka Satapathy, Pappi Santuka, Rajalaxmi, Kuni Panda, Bijay Pattanaik | Tarang Cine Productions, Tarang Plus | |
| M A Y | 15 | Detective Karan Arjun | Ashwini Gadanayak | Papu Pom Pom, Pragyan Khatua, Lipsa Mishra, Priyanka Mohanty, Kuna Tripathy, Jeeban Panda, Arabind Sadangi, Tukuna, Hadu, Rajeev, Kali, Manoj | Lipsa Mishra Productions, Papu Pom Pom Creations, Zee Sarthak Films and Zee Sarthak | |
| M A Y | 15 | Kou Akasha ra Janha | Rajendra Mohanta | Dibya Disha Mohanty, Subhasis Sharma, Somu, Saroj Das, Namita Das, Pradeep Dutta, Biranchi, Siya | Tarang Cine Productions, Tarang Plus | |
| M A Y | 20 | Au Gote Love Story | Sanjay Nayak | Jyoti Ranjan Nayak, Bhoomika Dash, Pushpa Panda, KK, Biju Badajena, Guddu | RR Events & Cine Productions | |
| M A Y | 20 | Love Fever | Chandan Jena | Rajveer Shankar Deo, Bandana Parmanik, Asit Pati, Pintu Nanda, Pushpa Panda, Meenaketan Das, Akshaya Das, Asrumochan Mohanty | Moon TV Movies | |
| M A Y | 27 | Prema ATM | Sudhanshu Mohan Sahoo | Pradeep Dutta, Dibya Disha Mohanty, Lipika Senapati | Maruti Movies | |
| M A Y | 27 | Drushtikona | Susant Mani | Elina Samantray, Subhashree, Bikash Das, Santosh Mahapatra, Hara Ratha, Saroj Parida | Akshay Parija Productions | |
| M A Y | 27 | Kukuda Chora | Anand Kumar | Shuvendu Padhy, Raja, Guddu, Kishore Mishra, Sabita Satapthy, K. Mohana Rao, Lal Bahadur Mallik | Gupteswar Creatives | |
| J U N E | 1 | Bhabe Sina Kahi Parena | Asit Pati | Abhisekh Rath, Archita Mohanty, Dushmant Panda, Pradyumna Lenka, Asit Pati | Debolina Productions | |
| J U N E | 3 | Premam | Tapas Sargharia | Babushaan Mohanty, Prakruti Mishra,Sidhant Mohapatra , Usasi Mishra | Emoji Films and Babushan Films, Disney Hotstar | |
| J U N E | 10 | Gupchup | Prithvi Raj Pattnaik | Amlan Das, Sailendra Samantaray, Mihir Das, Papu Pom Pom, Ananya Mishra, Aurosikha Mishra, Sunmeera Nagesh | Black and White Motion Picturez | |
| J U N E | 10 | Dil Mora Manena | Himanshu (Chandi) Parija | Swaraj Barik, Mihir Das, Sivani Sangita, Salil Mitra, Jeeban Panda, Usasi Mishra, Harihara Mahapatra, Bidusmita, Sridhar Marrtha | MT Entertainment (Maa Tarini Films) and Range Royal Cinelabs | |
| J U N E | 12 | Biswanath | Bobbili Kiran | Sambit Acharya, Mihir Das, Raimohan, Sambhabana Mohanty, Ananya Mishra, Pruthviraj Nayak, Manisha Mishra | HMT Productions | |
| J U N E | 12 | Chorani 2 | Mrityunjaya Sahoo | Suryamayee Mahapatra, Abhishek Panda, Diana Sahu | Tarang Cine Productions and Tarang Plus | |
| J U N E | 12 | Mo Panata Kanire Tu | Pinu Nayak | Mahasweta Ray, Harihara Mahapatra, Shraddha Panigrahi | Zee Sarthak Films and Zee Sarthak | |
| J U N E | 14 | Eka Tu Eka Mun | Sudhanshu Mohan Sahoo | Siddhanta Mahapatra, Anu Choudhury, Pradyumna Lenka | Sidharth Movies, Sidharth TV | |

== Jul–Sep ==
| Opening | | Title | Director | Cast | Production Company | Ref. |
|---|---|---|---|---|---|---|
| J U L Y | 1 | Bidyarana | Jyotee Dass | Babushaan Mohanty, Sivani Sangita, Priyanka Panigrahi, Abhishek Giri, Piyush Tripathy, Uttam Mohanty, Bobby Mishra | Tathya Realestate & Media and Acharya Entertainment | |
| J U L Y | 7 | Pratigya | Gopal Patnaik | Rabi Prasad Patra, M. D. Bablu, Rohit, Megha Ghosh, Lingaraj, Murali, Gopal Samantray, Tuna Tantan, Basanti Jena, Biswajit, Seemanchal, Arun, Naresh, Ankit Thukul | Bajrang Creation's | |
| J U L Y | 8 | Lage Prema Najara | Dilip Panda | Amlan Das, Riya Dey, Priya Choudhury, Ragini Sutradhar, Rakesh Deo, Bobby Mishra, Papi Santuka, Amar | Blue Eyes Entertainment | |
| J U L Y | 10 | Astika Nastika | Sudhansu Mohan Sahoo | Buddhaditya Mohanty, Supriya Nayak, Subham Nayak, Abhishek Giri, Cookies Swain, Tribhuvan Panda, Bhupati Tripathy, Saroj Das, Rakesh Deo | Pabitra Entertainment and Tarang Cine Productions | |
| J U L Y | 15 | Dil Re Achi Tori Na | Tripati Sahoo | Sambeet Acharya, Anuradha Panigrahi, Priyanka Panigrahi, Pradyumna Lenka, Jeeban Panda, Guddu, Tapu | RR Events and Cine Productions | |
| J U L Y | 15 | Maya Darpana | Rajeeb Mohanty | Prativa Panda, Ankit, Kuna Tripathy, Pradyumna Lenka, Jeeban Panda, Ratan Meher, Puja | Jharana Samal and Mahakala Production | |
| J U L Y | 17 | Kahibini Tate I Love You | Lubun-Tubun | Lubun Sen, Manaswini Pati, Shona Dwivedi, Saandip Mishra, Arpita Kar, Saroj Das, Rishna, Kalia, Disco Ready, Guddu, Chinku Samal, Pravati Sahoo, Pushpa Panda, Ashok Dash, Mili Mohanty | Titly Productions and LT Production | |
| J U L Y | 29 | Bali | Murali Krishna | Manoj Mishra, Smita Mohanty, Mama Samal, Suryakant | Surya Entertainment | |

== Oct–Dec ==
| Opening | | Title | Director | Cast | Production Company | Ref. |
|---|---|---|---|---|---|---|
| N O V E M B E R | 1 | DAMaN | Debi Prasad Lenka Vishal Mourya | Babushaan Mohanty, Dipanwit Dashmohapatra, Vaibhav Gohil, Udit Bhanu | JP Motion Pictures Amara Muzik Odia Mentis Films | |
| D E C E M B E R | 1 | Boura Hatabaksa | Narayan Pati | Rajesh Panda, Narayan Pati, Sabita Palei, Lopamudra Mishra | Chairosana Film Productions Pvt. Ltd | |
| D E C E M B E R | 2 | Pratikshya | Anupam Patnaik | Dipanwit DashMohapatra, Choudhury Jayprakash Das | | |
