= Chittaranjan Tripathy =

Indian Odia actor, director and composer (b. 1971)

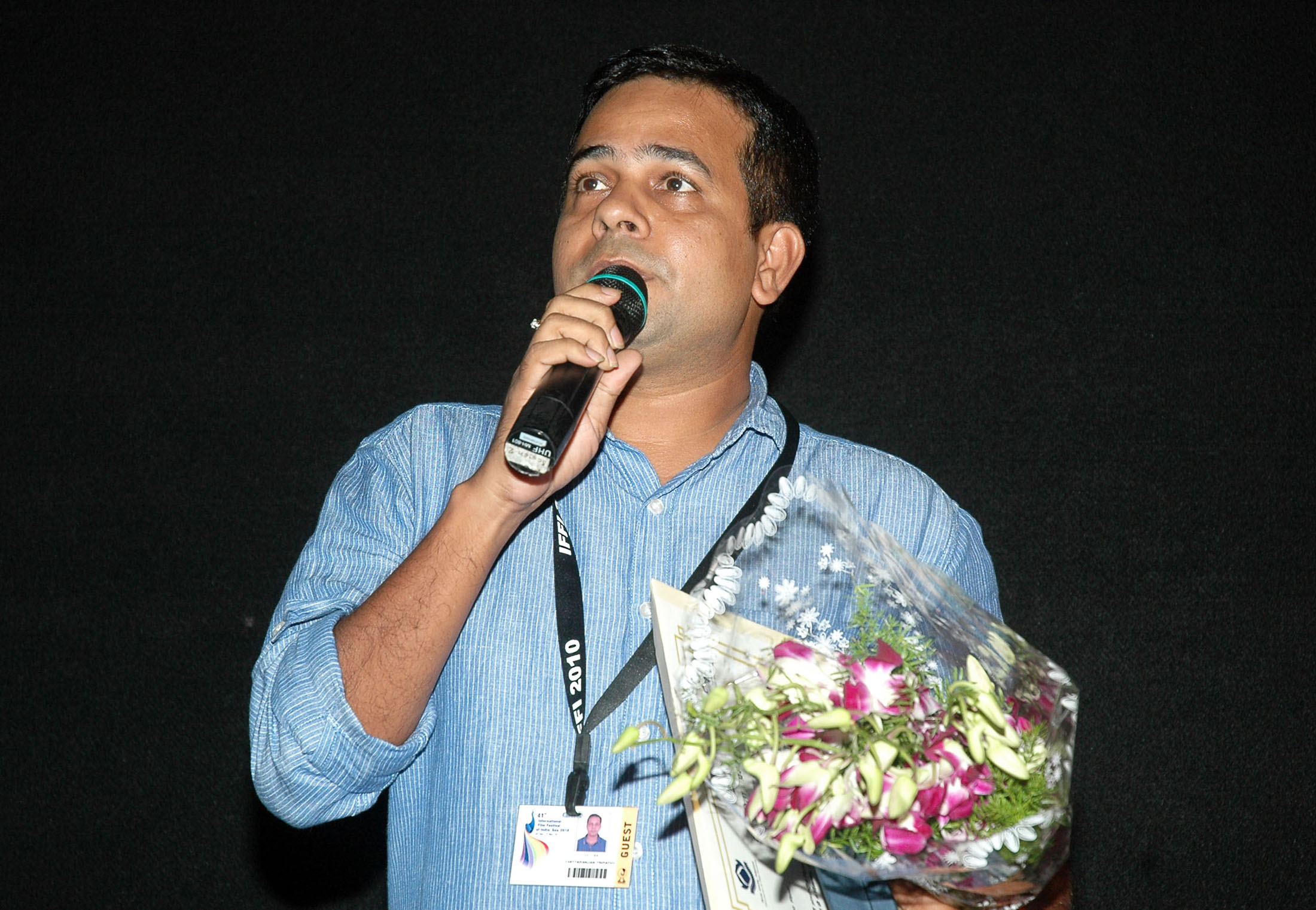
- Tripathy while presenting film Courtroom Nautanki in IFFI, 2010

Director of National School of Drama
- Incumbent
- Assumed office 6 October 2023
- Preceded by: Ramesh Chandra Gaur

Personal details
- Born: Chandabali, Bhadrak, Odisha, India
- Height: 5 ft 7 in (170 cm)
- Education: Ravenshaw College; University of Hyderabad; National School of Drama; Guildford School of Acting
- Occupation: Actor, director, writer, music director, lyricist

Chittaranjan Tripathy (born in 1971) is an Indian actor, director, writer and music director who predominantly works in Hindi and Odia films. He is best known for his role as Trivedi in the Netflix series Sacred Games.

== Early life and education ==
Tripathy was born in Chandabali in Odisha. He did his graduation from Ravenshaw College, Cuttack & completed his master's in sociology from University of Hyderabad in 1992. Further, he acquired a Diploma in Acting from the prestigious NSD, Delhi in 1996. Actor Nawazuddin Siddiqui was his batchmate there. He has done a specialization course in musical theater direction from Guildford School of Acting, London under a Charles Wallace India Trust Scholarship.

== Career ==
In 2007, Tripathy came to the Odia movie industry with his film Dhauli Express, for which he was producer, director, scriptwriter, music director, lyricist and playback singer. The film received three Odisha State Film Awards. He made another movie Mukhyamantri in 2009. Other than this he has made more than 50 plays, including the NSD Rep's premiere production of Taj Mahal Ka Tender (for which he directed as well as wrote lyrics and music). He has directed episodes of television soaps Dhund Legi Manjil Hume, Ye isk he, Jaani Pehchani Si Ajnabi, Mano Ya Na Mano, and Savdhan India. He has acted in Hindi movies Delhi 6, Fantom, Sandar, Talvar, and Tera mera tedha medha. Tripathy has composed over 500 songs for plays. His last success was playing the role of Trivedi in the popular Netflix web-series Sacred Games. He also played the negative character in the latest ALT Balaji and ZEE5 web-series M.O.M - Mission Over Mars (2019). In 2020, he starred in Odia movie Adrushyam made by S3 Movies along with Samaresh Routray, Saanu, Ankita Mishra and Lipsa Mishra.

On 6 October 2023, Chittaranjan Tripathy became the Director of his own alma mater, National School of Drama.

== Honours and awards ==
- 2007 - Mohana Sundara Dev Goswami Award - Dhauli Express
- 2007 - Odisha State Film Award for Best Music Director - Dhauli Express
- 2007 - Odisha State Film Award for Best Singer - Dhauli Express
- 2016 - Odisha State Film Award for Best Comedian - Love You Jessica

== Filmography ==
=== Films ===
Year	Film	Role	Director	Notes
2007	Dhauli Express	Munna Bhai MBA	Chittaranjan Tripathy	Story Writer, Director, Producer, Lyricist, Music Director
2009	Mukhyamantri	Naidu Babu	Chittaranjan Tripathy	Story Writer, Director, Producer, Lyricist, Music Director
2009	Delhi 6	Ramleela Announcer	Rakesh Omprakash Mehra	
2015	Phantom	Prisoner	Kabir Khan	
2015	Shaandaar	Vinay Arora	Vikas Bahl	
2015	Talvar	Basu	Meghna Gulzar	
2015	Tera Mera Tedha Medha	Mangal	Chittaranjan Tripathy	
2016	Pramod Gupta J.E.	Promod Gupta	Chittaranjan Tripathy	
2017	Shubh Mangal Saavdhan	Mudit's father	R.S. Prasanna	
2017	Mukkabaaz	Shravan Railway Boss	Anurag Kashyap	
2017	Jagga Jasoos	Mr. Bhaduri	Anurag Basu	
2018	Prem Kumar: Salesman of the year	Sarojkant	Tapas Sargharia	
2019	Kanpuriye	Dr. Mohan Mishra	Ashish Aryan	
2020	Indoo Ki Jawani	Uncle Pran Loha	Abir Sengupta	
2022	Dasvi	Tandon; IAS officer and Ganga Ram's secretary	Tushar Jalota	
2024	Yodha	S N Dhingra	Sagar Ambre, Pushkar Ojha	
2024	Do Patti	Advocate Kumar	Kanika Dhillon	
2025	Songs of Paradise	Tibbu Ji	Danish Renzu	
2025	Tere Ishk Mein	Professor	Aanand L. Rai	

=== Television ===
Year	Title	Role	Network	Notes
2018–present	Sacred Games	Trivedi	Netflix	
2019	M.O.M. - Mission Over Mars	Binayak Mohanty	ALTBalaji, ZEE5	
2020–present	Raktanchal	Bechan Singh	MX Player	
2021-	Runaway Lugai	Dashrath Pandey	MX Player	
2021-	Jholachhap	Jitender	MX Player	
2023-	Farzi	Lawyer Kumar	Amazon Prime	
