= Odiaone Entertainment =

Indian entertainment channel

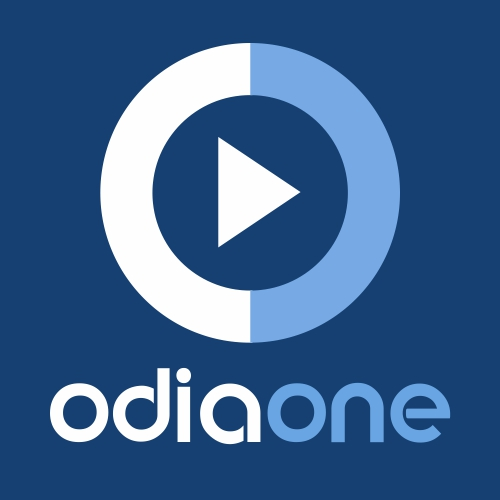
- Odiaone logo from 2012 to 2016
- Country: India

Programming
- Language: Odia

Ownership
- Owner: Samaresh Routray

History
- Launched: 2 July 2012

Odiaone Entertainment is an entertainment digital channel of Odisha. It also does film production of regional language of Odisha. It was founded by Samaresh Routray in 2012.

== History ==
Odiaone Entertainment is the first digital channel in Odisha which was founded in 2012 by Samaresh Routray. S3 Movies is a part of this company.

== Filmography ==
=== Films Under Music Label of Odiaone ===
- Katak
- Hey Sakha
- Luchakali
- Mun
- Love Master
- Rumku Jhumana
- Rudra
- Sapanara Naika
- Hari Om Hari
- Mu Diwana To pain
- Omm Sai Tujhe Salam
- Alar
- Tanka Tate Salam
- Kaunri kanya
- Gaddabadd
- Sandehi Priyatama
- Tu Aau Mun
- Khas Tumari Pain
- Sahitya Didi
- Omm
- Sangam
- Aame Ta Toka Sandha Marka
- My First Love
- Oolala Oolala
- Rockstar

=== Films under Digital Channel of Odiaone ===
- Suna Chadei
- Suna Palinki
- Hasila Sansar Bhangila Kia
- Kotea Re Gotea
- Dhauli Express
- Lal Tuk Tuk Sadhaba Bohu
- Rasika Nagar
- Tumaku Paruni Ta Bhuli
- Dhire Dhire Prema Hela
- Tu Mo Girl Friend
- Hero
- Kemiti Ea Bandhan
- Kebe Tume Nahan Kebe Mu Nahin
- Chanda Na Tume Tara
- Dharma
- Chowka Chhaka
- Aasha
- Sunya Swaroop
- Bhul Bujibani Mate
