= Pupul Bhuyan =

Indian actress, TV presenter, and model

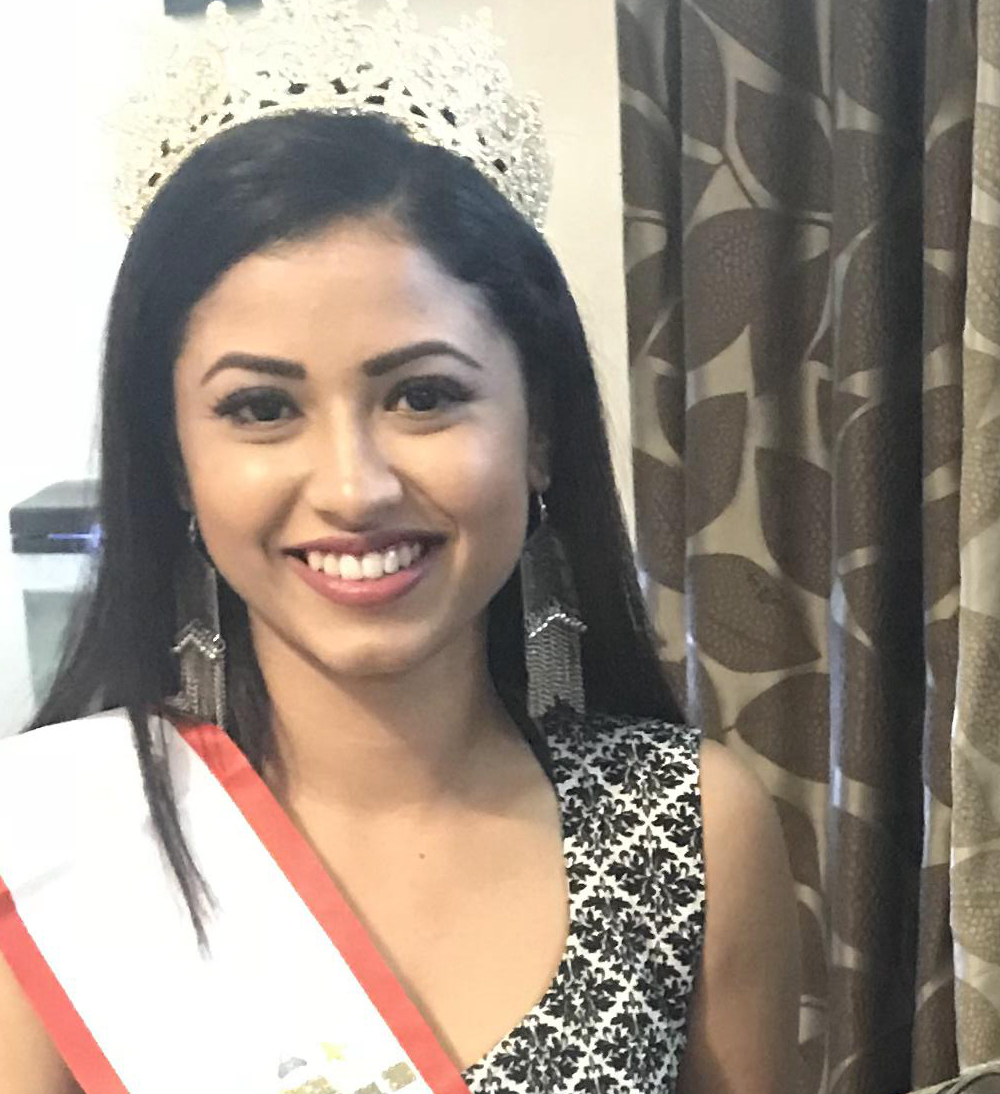
- Born: Sainkul, Keonjhar district, Odisha
- Other name: Payal Bhuyan
- Education: Buxi Jagabandhu Bidyadhar College
- Occupations: (Odia) actress, TV presenter
- Years active: 2012 - present
- Spouse: Deep Thadani
- Parent(s): BataKrishna Bhuyan (father); Baijayantimala Bhuyan (mother)
- Awards: Rupanagara Mahanagara Award for Best Female Debut; Opera Mrs India Global 2018

Pupul Bhuyan (Odia pronunciation: [pupulɔ bʱujaː̃]) is an Indian actress, television presenter, and model who has mostly appeared in Odia films, telefilms, daily shops, and reality shows. She started her film career in Ollywood in 2013 through the 1st Odia 3D film Kaunri Kanya along with Kavya Keeran. In 2018, she was crowned as the winner at Opera Mrs. India Global pageant.

== Early life ==
She was born at Sainkul village of Keonjhar district of Odisha to BataKrishna Bhuyan and Baijayantimala Bhuyan. She is a graduate from the Buxi Jagabandhu Bidyadhar College, Bhubaneswar. In 2016, she married Deep Thadani.

== Career ==
Bhuyan started her career as a stage presenter and then hosted some solo television shows like E-News, Apananka Pasand, etc. Later she started hosting reality shows like SaReGaMaPa little Champs, Swara Odishara, Mun bi Heroine Hebi, etc.

In 2013, she debuted in Odia film industry in a lead role through the first Odia 3D film, Kaunri Kanya directed by Somya Ranjan Sahu. Later she played some character roles in Odia movies like Blackmail, Bidyarana, etc. In 2023, she started in Niyati by S3 Movies.

Apart from anchoring and acting, she is active in modeling. In 2018, she had participated the Opera Mrs. India Global pageant and won that. Apart from the crown, she had won the best ramp walk award in the semifinal. In 2022 she was featured on the cover photo an Odia magazine, Shubhapallaba. Before that, in 2016, she was featured on Kadambini magazine.

== Filmography ==
Year	Film	Language	Role	Note
2013	Kaunri Kanya	Odia	Anusaya	Debuted in Ollywood
2015	Bhala Pae Tate 100 Ru 100	Odia		
2018	Blackmail	Odia		
2022	Bidyarana	Odia		
2023	Delivery Boy			
2023	Niyati		Sadhana	
Filming	Anubhav- a loverboy		Barsha	
Filming	Tu Mo Kamjori			
Filming	Ajati			

== Television ==
Title	Channel	Note
Nannda Putuli	Manjari TV	Odia dailyshop
E-News	OTV	Presenter
E-Gossip	OTV	Presenter
Tele Trvel	OTV	Presenter
The Review Show	MBC TV	Presenter
Ama Rosei Ghara	Tarang TV	Presenter
Jita Odisha Jiea	Tarang TV	Presenter
Apananka Pasand	ETV Odia	Presenter
Swara Odishara	Sarthak TV	Presenter
Mun bi Heroine Hebi	Sarthak TV	Presenter
SaReGaMaPa Little Champs	Sarthak TV	Presenter

== Awards ==
- Rupanagara Mahanagara Award for Best Female Debut
- Show Time Award for Best Dubut Female
- Opera Mrs India Global 2018
