= Shuddhashuddha tattvas =

The Shuddhashuddha tattvas or "Pure-Impure" tatwas, in Shaivite and Shakta Tantric metaphysics, refer to the seven of the 36 tattvas from maya to purusha. It is also one of the five main divisions (kala) or stages of Involution of the supreme consciousness, in Kashmir Shaivite cosmology.

The tattvas are:

- Māyā tattva: Maya is the universally formative and limiting principle, the "material" cause of the "impure sphere." Maya brings into being under the influence of the Sadvidya-Tattwa(atman) the following five tattvas, known as the "five sheaths," pancha kanchuka, which restrict the universal Self to being and the individual soul, the purusha.
- Kalā tattva limitation of authority or efficacy - the Self, which is an All Doer, becomes a Little Doer. Can also refer to creativity, aptitude, the power which draws the soul toward spiritual knowledge. Its energy partially removes the veil of anava-mala which clouds the inherent powers of the soul.
- Vidyā tattva: limited knowledge, the Self which is an all-knower becomes a little knower. Knowledge in accord with its present life experiences.
- Rāga tattva: attachment, inclination, limitation of fullness, giving rise to desire for various objects.
- Kāla tattva: limitation of eternity, giving rise to the phenomenon of time, which divides all experience into past, present, and future.
- Niyati tattva: restriction or limitation of freedom, giving rise to karma (cause and effect), necessity, and order. (more on Niyati).
- Purusha tattva: the limited spiritual consciousness, the soul or separate "EGO", the subjective principle. Through identification with the five Kanchukas or "coverings" the Self (atman) becomes a purusha, or limited, transmigrating soul, capable of experiencing the cosmos as a limited individual.
