= 91.9 Sidharth FM =

Coordinates: 20.477259°N 85.841499°E

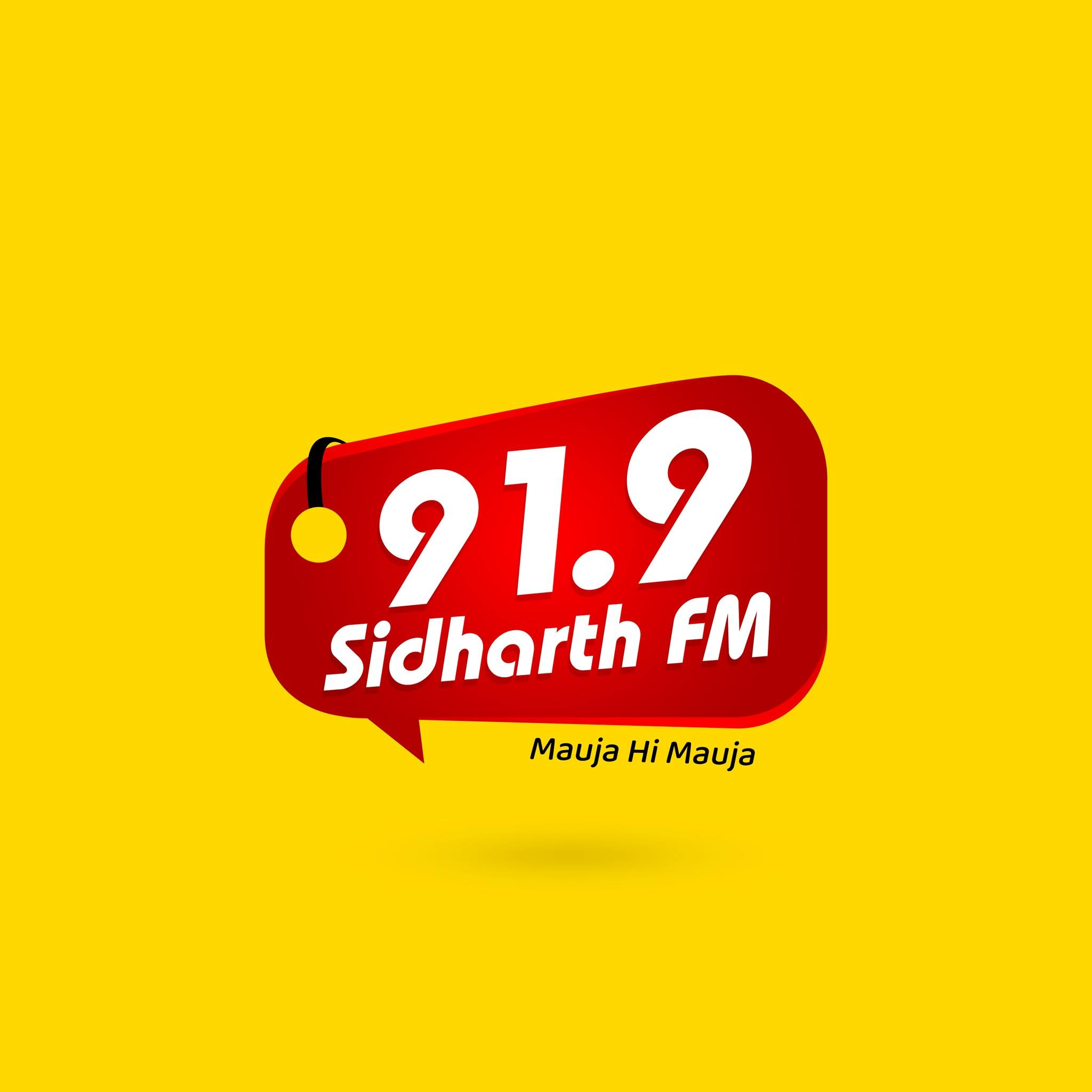
- Cuttack, Odisha; India
- Frequency: 91.9 MHz

Programming
- Language: Odia
- Format: Contemporary hit radio
- Network: Sidharth TV Network

Ownership
- Owner: Sitaram Agarwal & Namita Agarwal

History
- First air date: 29 April 2017

Links
- Webcast: Sarthak FM Station
- Website: www.sidharthfm.com

91.9 Sidharth FM, earlier known as Sarthak FM. Sidharth FM radio stations broadcast from Cuttack. This channel provides 24x7 superhit Odia songs and Hindi songs music. The promoters of this group are Sitaram Agarwal & Namita Agarwal. Enriched with a vast library of Odia Songs, the station was launched on 29 April 2017.

From 1 September 2021, 91.9 Sarthak FM has been renamed as 91.9 Sidharth FM. Post launch of three satellite television channels by Sidharthtv Network - Sidharth TV (GEC), Sidharth Bhakti (Devotional) and Sidharth Gold (Movies & Music) in May 2021 they have incorporated all their business verticals under the brand of Sidharth.

The first independent song of 91.9 Sidharth FM is Niswasa To Bina Mora Chalena.

== Broadcasting ==
Sidharth FM is broadcast from Cuttack stations in Odisha at 91.9 FM frequency.

== Programmes ==
Days	Time	Show Name	Radio Jockey	Details
Mon-Sun	5 AM - 6 AM	Aradhana	RJ Sonalisa	All renowned singer's top Bhajans with Prabachaka Kalpana Tripathy's Day specific Two links
Mon-Sun	6 AM - 7 AM	Puja Phula	RJ Sonalisa	Dedicated Devotional Show with Back-to-Back Songs of Namita Agrawal
Mon-Sat	7 AM - 9 AM	MJ with Jalsha Boy Sunny	RJ Sunny	Morning infos, Interactive chatting with callers regarding recent happenings, Weather update, Gold Rate, special occasions, festivals & Traffic Updates. Today's event at Sri Mandir.
Mon-Sat	9 AM - 1 PM	FILMY SHRUTI	RJ SHRUTI	SYNDICATE SHOW (The show sticks to its thought of Masala content and Filmy Talks).
Mon-Sat	1 PM - 5 PM	Mid Day Magic With Madhu	RJ MADHU	Topic-based Information with listeners' song Dedication. Fully interactive show with listeners.
Mon-Sat	5 PM - 9 PM	CAFÉ 919	RJ Ayushman	Special Topic with phone calls, India is not for beginners funny info, Sports, Netigen's Masala, Bollywood Entertainment, OTT, Funny One linner in extro
Mon-Sat	9 PM - 12 AM	SHREYA CAFÉ	RJ SHREYA	SYNDICATE SHOW (The show sticks to feel-good moments relating to people, place, emotions, lifestyle, OTT, Story)

== Weekend special shows ==
Days	Time	Show Name	Radio Jockey	Details
Sunday	7 AM - 9 AM	Chhuti Re Khati	RJ Madhu	Interesting updates around the world along with local topics.
Sunday	9 AM - 1 PM	FILMY SHRUTI Weekend Special	RJ SHRUTI	SYNDICATE SHOW (The show sticks to its thought of Masala content and Filmy Talks)
Sunday	1 PM - 3 PM	Chal Gapiba Gita Suniba	RJ Sunayana	Topic-based Information with listeners' song Dedication. Fully interactive show with listeners.
Sunday	3 PM - 5 PM	KHB (Katha Haba Bindas)	RJ Sunny	Every show with a new celebrity from any field about their achievements or day-specific topics.
Sunday	5 PM - 9 PM	CAFÉ 919	RJ Ayushman	Special Topic with phone calls, India is not for beginners funny info, Sports, Netigen's Masala, Bollywood Entertainment, One linner in extro
Sunday	9 PM - 12 AM	SHREYA CAFÉ	RJ SHREYA	SYNDICATE SHOW (The show sticks to feel-good moments relating to people, place, emotions, lifestyle, OTT, Story).

== YouTube channels ==
- YouTube channel of Sidharth FM for new odia songs is Sidharth Music.
- For devotional songs - Sidharth Bhakti & Namita Agarwal.

== See also ==
- Namita Agarwal
