= Tora Dine Ku Mora Dine =

- Film Poster
- Directed by: Sudhanshu Mohan sahu
- Screenplay by: Ranjit Pattnaik
- Produced by: Sitaram Agrawal
- Starring: Arindam Roy; Amlan Das; Riya Dey; Sheetal Patra
- Cinematography: S.Ramesh
- Edited by: Rajesh Dash
- Production company: Sarthak Music
- Distributed by: Sitaram Agarwal
- Release date: 7 October 2016
- Country: India
- Language: Odia

Tora Dine Ku Mora Dine is a 2016 Indian Odia action comedy-drama film directed by Sudhanshu Mohan Sahu. Arindam Roy, Amlan, Riya Dey and Sheetal Patra are in lead roles. The film is a remake of the Tamil film Drohi. It released to negative reviews and was declared as a flop.

== Cast ==
- Arindam Roy
- Amlan Das
- Riya Dey
- Sheetal Patra
- Mihir Das
- Pragyan khatua

== Soundtrack ==
Tora Dine Ku Mora Dine

Soundtrack album by Malaya Mishra
- Released: 1 October 2016
- Genre: Feature film soundtrack
- Length: 24:17
- Label: Sarthak Music

The music of Tora Dine Ku Mora Dine is composed by Malaya Mishra while the lyrics are written by Mohit Chakraborty, Bapu Goswami and Arun Mantri. The soundtrack was released on 1 October 2016.

Track listing
No.	Title	Singer(s)	Length
1.	"To Niriha Aakhire"	Humane sagar, Nivedita	5:20
2.	"Tora Mora Setting"	Tarique, Jagruti	4:46
3.	"O Sexy Sexy Rajkumar Ganjam"	Tarique, Sangram, Dibya	4:44
4.	"Diwani Diwani"	Saurin Bhatt, Nivedita	4:14
5.	"Aei Mora Mane"	Nivedita, RS Kumar	5:13
Total length:			24:17
