= Prema Adhei Akhyara =

Indian romantic drama film

- Directed by: Sudhakar Basant
- Written by: Rajani Ranjan
- Screenplay by: Sudhakar Basant
- Story by: Sunita Narendra Singh; Selvaraghavan (unc.)
- Produced by: Narayan Nayak
- Starring: Babushaan Mohanty; Riya Dey
- Cinematography: Ramesh Babu
- Edited by: Sarbana
- Music by: Malay Misra
- Production company: Umamani Visual Creations
- Release date: 14 October 2010
- Country: India
- Language: Oriya

Prema Adhei Akhyara is a 2010 Indian Oriya-language romantic drama film directed by Sudhakar Basant. A remake of the 2007 Telugu film Aadavari Matalaku Arthale Verule, the film stars Babushaan Mohanty and Riya Dey in her debut.

== Plot ==
Amar is from a middle-class family. He makes several bids to obtain employment, but all go in vain due to his poor language skills and inadequate educational qualifications. All his friends settled in life, but he continues to struggle to find employment. Amar has two best friends, Raja and Pintu. His father is a teacher and is always critical of him for being an irresponsible person, only adding to his already long list of woes.

At this juncture, Amar catches a glimpse of Chandini and immediately falls in love with her. He learns that she works for a software solutions firm. Luckily, Amar eventually secured employment in the same firm. Chandini, however, turns out to be short-tempered. On a business trip, Amar accompanies her along with other colleagues to Australia. There, he reveals his feelings of love to her. She declines, saying that she comes from an orthodox family, and her marriage has already been arranged with her cousin.

Amar returns to India in a depressed manner. Unable to see his son in depression, his father tries to convince Chandini, but she insults him for recommending his son's love and accidentally slaps both Amar and his father. Later that night, Amar's father dies of a heart attack. Amar again goes into depression. To ease Amar's mood, Raja persuades him to come along to his family's house in the countryside. Coincidentally, on the train journey, Chandini is revealed to be Raja's fiancée. However, their grandfather's intention of getting them married earlier is put aside because Raja and Chandini leave the house to make their own identity. This causes heartache to their grandfather.

With the passing of a few days, the parents of Chandini and Raja decide to marry to appease their grandfather. After several turns of events, Chandini realizes that she is in love with Amar instead. Amar asks her to forget him, during a late-night meeting, because he believes that it would create problems in their happy family. Chandini's grandfather notices them conversing and admonishes Chandini for bringing disrepute to their family and asks Amar to leave his village. Amar gets ready to leave when he sees everyone putting up decorations for the wedding. Raja furiously asks him to get out but Amar responds that they have misunderstood Chandini all along. While Amar is on his way, a bunch of goons he saved the family from stabbed him in the stomach, and he is hospitalized.

However, Raja and Chandini's wedding is taking place that morning. Upon knowing Amar's condition, Pintu asks Raja to come and help. Though initially reluctant, Raja abandons his wedding to help Amar. Everyone else slowly leaves for the hospital, except Chandini and her grandfather. Chandini says that she would never disobey her grandfather. Afterward, her grandfather takes Chandini to the hospital. While Amar recovers and wakes up to leave, he sees that everyone in the family is outside his room, including Chandini and her grandfather.

In time, Chandini's family comes to stay with Amar for a few days. The film ends when Amar and Chandini become a couple and live together.

== Cast ==
- Babushaan Mohanty as Amar
- Riya Dey as Chandini / Kusum
- Subashish Sharma as Raja
- Priya Mahapatra as Puja / Susama
- Mihir Das as Amar's father
- Namrata Das as Jeje Maa
- Bijay Mohanty as Bikram Choudhury
- Pintu Nanda as Pintu
- Harihara Mahapatra as Hari
- Samaresh Routray as Dina
- Pratibha Sahu as Chandini's mother
- Pushpa Panda as Raja's mother
- Ankit Anurag
- Sreela Tripathy as an item number

== Production ==
Dancer Riya Dey made her film debut through this film after an event manager told director Sudhakar Basant about her. The twists in the plot were revealed to be similar to the ones in Kismat Konnection (2008). Part of the film was shot in Bhingarpur, Odisha. Babushaan Mohanty got injured in an action sequence.

== Soundtrack ==
The music was composed by Malay Misra. The song "Megharu Tu Jharilu" is based on "Yemaindi Ee Vela" from the original.

Track listing
No.	Title	Singer(s)	Length
1.	"Aakashaku Udijibi"	Munna Aziz	3:44
2.	"Aasena Pakkhaku"	Vinod Rathod	5:07
3.	"Baanra Chadhel"	T. Souri	4:25
4.	"Dekha Hela"	Udit Narayan	4:52
5.	"Dura Aakashare Janha"	Babushaan Mohanty	4:41
6.	"Megharu Tu Jharilu"	Babushaan Mohanty	5:24
Total length:			28:13

== Box office ==
The film was a box office success, but the producer did not make money off of the film.

== Home media ==
The film was telecast on Tarang TV on 2 p.m. on 12 November 2017.

== Accolades ==
Odisha State Film Awards

- Best Actor - Babushaan Mohanty
- Best Actress - Riya Dey
- Best Singer - Babushaan Mohanty
- Best Supporting Actor - Mihir Das
