= Tomar Jonyo =

2008 Indian Bengali film

- Directed by: Nilanjan Banerjee
- Produced by: Zee Motion Pictures
- Starring: Rishi Roy; Shriya Jha; Kanchan Mullick; Supriyo Dutt; Soumitra Chatterjee; Locket Chatterjee; Alokananda
- Cinematography: Samiran Dutt
- Edited by: Sharmistha Jha
- Music by: Jolly Mukherjee
- Distributed by: Zee Motion Pictures
- Release date: 14 November 2008
- Country: India
- Language: Bengali

Tomar Jonyo or Tomar Janna (For You) is a 2008 Indian Bengali film directed by Nilanjan Banerjee. The movie features Rishi, Koel Mallick was supposedly cast as the female lead but she opted out, due to date problems. Shriya plays Aankhee, a visually challenged girl who runs a flower shop and falls in love with Joseph (Rishi Roy, named Arindam Roy in Ollywood but rename himself to Rishi for Bengali Film Industry. Nilanjan Banerjee is a SRFTI graduate.

== Plot ==
The story is about Joseph, an orphan, who is brought up by a Father of a church. Joseph is the driver of a famous Tollywood actress Reshmi Ghosh and also sings at a pub. Joseph falls in love with a blind girl Ankhi but hides his original identity from her and her mother. For them he is Aditya, a rich businessman. One day from Ankhi's mother Joseph discovers that Ankhi's eyes can be cured but it will cost 5 lakhs rupees. He takes the money from a goon and helps his gang to kidnap Reshmi, the actress. Joseph's childhood friend Kancha tries to stop him from doing this crime, but fails to stop him. But honest Joseph doesn't become a criminal, when Ankhi enters the O.T. he surrenders to police, and is imprisoned for four years. Upon his release, he finds the Father is no more. He searches for Ankhi and finds that she has become very rich. He decides not to reveal his identity to Ankhi and stay away from her. Joseph gets a job of a singer at a bar with Kancha's help. There Rahul Roy notices him and gives him the job of his driver. Suddenly Joseph learns that Ankhi is currently Rahul's love interest. On the day of their engagement Rahul forces Joseph to sing a song. By listening to the song Ankhi realizes that Joseph is Aditya and she leaves the party with tears. Rahul understands the situation. In this mean time Reshmi arrives at the party for being the schoolmate of Rahul. There she identifies Joseph and tells everyone that he is a criminal. But Rahul understands the love and feelings of Joseph and allows Ankhi and Joseph to get engaged and thus the movie ends happily.

== Cast ==
- Rishi Roy as Joseph
- Subrat Dutta as Rahul Roy
- Shriya Jha as Aankhi
- Kanchan Mullick
- Supriyo Dutt
- Soumitra Chatterjee as father (cameo)
- Locket Chatterjee as Reshmi Ghosh, an actress
- Alokananda

== Critical reception ==
The Telegraph said that The taut treatment, the highs and lows in the storyline and a sensible dose of humour help keep the film afloat.
