= Odisha Film Development Corporation =

- Abbreviation: OFDC
- Formation: 1976
- Headquarters: Chalachitra Bhawan, Buxi Bazar, Cuttack
- Region served: Odisha
- Chairman: Kuna Tripathy
- Website: https://odfilm.org

The Odisha Film Development Corporation is a Public Sector Undertaking (PSU) of Government of Odisha. Odisha Film Development Corporation is a promotional agency for the growth and development of film industry in Odisha established in 1976 in Cuttack to promote the Odia film industry.

== Achievements ==
- Establishment of Kalinga Studios with Complete Facilities for Indoor Shooting, Outdoor Shooting, Editing, Dubbing, Music Recording (Mono Stereo), Mixing in 16mm, 35mm and Cinema Scope Format
- Establishment of Prasad Kalinga Film Laboratory for Processing and Printing of Colour and Black & White Films in 16mm, 35mm and Cinema Scope Format
- Establishment of a Video Complex in Kalinga Studio for Production of Video Films, Telefilms and Serials with Facilities for Editing, Recording, Dubbing and Shooting
- Organisation of 16 of Regional Film Festivals for Screening of Various Award Winning and Indian Panorama Films
- Organisation of 9 of Children's Film Festivals in Collaboration with Children Film Society of India
- Organisation of the 5th International Children's Film Festival in the Year 1987
- Organisation of 13 Foreign Film Festivals
- Sanction of subsidy to 283 Oriya & Other Languages Featured Films & Documentary Films
- Sanction of subsidy to 13 New Cinema Houses Equivalent to ET Collected for First 2 Years
- Sanction of loan for Construction of Cinema Houses to 86 Entrepreneurs
- Sanction of Soft Loans for Production of 95 Odia Featured Films
- Sanction of Term Loan for Production of 41 Odia Feature Films
- Establishment of an Office Complex known as Chalachitra Bhawan to House the Headquarter of the OFDC at Cuttack with a Film Archive and Preview Theatre
- Declaration of Film Production and Cinema Hall Construction as Industrial Activities
- Enforcement of Compulsory Screening of Odia Feature Films in the Cinema Houses since 11 December 1978
- Opening of Regional Office of the Board of Film Certification

== Past Chairpersons ==
- Muzibula Khan, Chairman of Odisha Film Development Corporation
- Devdas Chhotray, Director of Odisha Film Development Corporation (1983-89 & 1996-98).
- Sarat Pujari, Member of the Board of Directors

== See also ==
- National Film Development Corporation of India
