= Romeo Juliet (2017 film) =

- Directed by: Sudhakar Vasanth
- Produced by: Ramesh Barik
- Starring: Arindam Roy; Barsha Priyadarshini; Mihir Das
- Cinematography: Bhaskar V. Reddy
- Music by: Prem Annand
- Production company: M. R. Movies
- Release date: 14 July 2017
- Country: India
- Language: Odia

Romeo Juliet is a 2017 Indian Odia-language romance comedy featured film directed by Sudhakar Vasanth. The film stars Arindam Roy and Barsha Priyadarshini. The cast also includes Dipika Tripathy, Mihir Das and Prativa Panda.

== Cast ==
- Arindam Roy
- Barsha Priyadarshini
- Dipika Tripathy
- Mihir Das
- Prativa Panda
