= Niyati =

- Directed by: Pinaki Srichandan
- Written by: Pinaki Srichandan
- Screenplay by: Pinaki Srichandan
- Story by: Pinaki Srichandan
- Produced by: Premalata Routray; Samaresh Routray
- Starring: Sudhanshu Narayan Dash; Divyadisha Mohanty; Samaresh Routray; Pupul Bhuyan
- Cinematography: Akshaya Kumar Nayak
- Edited by: KD Sipun
- Music by: Anurag Pattnaik
- Production company: OdiaOne
- Distributed by: S3 Movies
- Release date: 21 July 2023
- Country: India
- Language: Odia

Niyati is a 2023 Indian Odia-language Crime Thriller Film written and directed by Pinaki Srichandan in his Debut and released on 21 July 2023. The Movie Opened with Positive Appreciation From Audiences and Renowned Persons from Odia Film Industry. It was produced by Premalata Routray and Samaresh Routray under S3 Movies banner. Musician Anurag Patnaik composed all the songs in the movie. Sudhanshu Narayan Dash and Divya Mohanty played the lead role. Actors like Pupul Bhuyan, Samaresh Routray, Krishna Kar various roles in the movie.

== Cast ==
- Sudhanshu Narayan Dash as Mohan Pattnaik
- Divya Mohanty as Radhika Pattnaik
- Samaresh Routray as ACP Tiger
- Pupul Bhuyan as Sadhana
- Krishna Kar as Kalia Bhai
- Bishan Balabhadra Satapathy as Kali
- Udit Guru as Bikash
- Subhranshu Nayak as Doctor
- Abhijit Patra as Ranajit
- Ankit Patnaik as Sandeep

== Release ==
This movie was released on 21 July 2023 in theaters and received appreciation from audiences and renowned peoples from the industry for its unique story and direction.

== Accolades ==
Pinaki Srichandan, who wrote the story for Niyati, won the Odisha State Film Award for Best Story for 2023.
