= Shriya Jha =

Indian Odia actress

- Born: Dehradun, India
- Occupations: model, actress, television presenter
- Years active: 2008–present
- Parent: Amardeep Jha

Shriya Jha (10 June, 1992) is an Indian film and television actress who has acted in Telugu, Odia and Bengali films. She is the daughter of actress Amardeep Jha. She has played the lead character in Rajshri Productions' Hindi serial Jhilmil Sitaaron Ka Angan Hoga on Sahara One. She completed her schooling from GNFC School, Mussoorie. She was lately seen as Sweety in Nimki Mukhiya on Star Bharat and in Ishaaron Ishaaron Mein on Sony Entertainment Television. She was last seen as Barkha Shergill in Ziddi Dil Maane Na on Sony Sab.

== Filmography ==
=== Telugu films ===
- Gita (2008 film)

=== Bengali films ===
- Tomar Jonyo (2008)
- Olot Palot (2009 film)

=== Odia films ===
- Luchakali(2012)
- Ama Bhitare Kichi Achi
- Shatru Sanghar(2009)

== TV shows ==
- Adrishyam - The Invisible Heroes as Ravi Verma's wife (2024)
- Jhilmil Sitaaron Ka Aangan Hoga as Angana Raichand (Lead role)
- Do Dil Bandhe Ek Dori Se as Madhavi (Antagonist)
- Uttaran as Chameli (Antagonist)
- Nimki Mukhiya as Sweety, Nimki's sister-in-law and Rituraj's wife (Protagonist) 2018-2019
- Nimki Vidhayak as Sweety Abhimanyu Rai (2019-2020)
- Ishaaron Ishaaron Mein as Mohana Banerjee (2020)
- Ziddi Dil Maane Na as Barkha Shergill (2021-2022)
