= Kaunri Kanya =

- Directed by: Soumya Ranjan Sahu
- Screenplay by: Soumya Ranjan Sahu
- Produced by: Ramya Ranjan Sahu
- Starring: Soumya Ranjan Sahu; Kavya Keeran; Pupul Bhuyan; Prakruti Mishra; Rehan; Ashutosh; Bighna; Ardhendu; Sudipta
- Music by: Satya; Mithun
- Production company: Angel Bee Medias
- Release date: 20 December 2013
- Country: India
- Language: Odia

Kaunri Kanya (English: Possessed Girl) is the first 3D Oriya horror film, directed by debutant director Soumya Ranjan Sahu. The film stars several debutant actors. The film was also dubbed into Tamil. It is the first Oriya film to feature an underwater sequence which was shot in Vizag. While most of the shooting happened in Surangi, Ganjam, Odisha, the background score and music were done by South Indian artists Satya and Mithun. Prakruti Mishra gives a special appearance in the film.

The movie is based around the story of a doctor whose wife becomes possessed by an evil spirit. This film explores social stigmas viz. superstition, witchcraft, sorcery and belief of people on casting spells and summoning evil spirits to take girls into possession which leads to murdering of innocent people falsely accused of practicing black magic.

== Plot ==
Akash, a doctor by profession, is transferred to a village. After a sequence of unnatural incidents his wife, Riya becomes possessed by an evil spirit. Akash takes help from psychiatrist Doctor Rajiv and tries to discover reasons behind the incidents and his wife's possession. He tries to bring his wife, Riya, out of possession of an evil spirit and that's when he learns about Ravi and Anusuya who belonged to the village and loved each other. The villagers killed Anusuya suspecting her of practicing witchcraft.

== Track list ==
1. Soniya Soniya
2. Rangabati
3. Priya Re
4. Dara Lage
