= Adrishyam: The Invisible Heroes =

Hindi language web-series

- Genre: Thriller
- Created by: Sachin Pandey
- Written by: Anshuman Sinha
- Directed by: Anshuman Kishore Singh
- Starring: Divyanka Tripathi; Eijaz Khan
- Country of origin: India
- Original language: Hindi
- No. of seasons: 2

Production
- Producers: Sachin Pandey & Adity Pandey

Original release
- Network: SonyLIV
- Release: 11 April 2024 – present

Adrishyam – The Invisible Heroes is an Indian Hindi language espionage thriller web series, directed by Anshuman Kishore Singh, and developed by Anshuman Sinha, Kumar Chanakya, Sachin Pandey and Adity Pandey starring Divyanka Tripathi and Eijaz Khan in lead roles, alongside Swaroopa Ghosh, Tarun Anand, Chirag Mehra, Shweta Ojha, Roshnee Ra, Parag Chadh, Zara Khan, and Shriya Jha.

The show is streaming now on Sony LIV

== Synopsis ==
Adrishyam chronicles the lives of two undercover operatives, Ravi Verma and Parvati Sehgal, as they navigate covert operations for the Bharat Intelligence Agency. Disguised as average middle-class employees of the meteorological department, Ravi and Parvati discreetly track and neutralize terrorist threats to safeguard civilians.

With Adrishyam, audiences will delve into a world of intrigue and suspense as Ravi and Parvati navigate the complexities of their double lives. The series offers a gripping narrative, filled with twists and turns, as these hidden heroes confront dangerous adversaries in their quest to protect their country and its people.

== Cast ==
- Divyanka Tripathi Dahiya as Parvati Sehgal
- Eijaz Khan as Ravi Verma
- Swaroopa Ghosh as Ronjeeta Ray
- Tarun Anand as Prashant Nadkarni
- Shriya Jha as Ravi's wife
- Roshnee Rai as Asha
- Mir Sarawar
- Chirag Mehra as Arjun
- Gaurav Pancha as terrorist
- Shweta Ojha as Sub Inspector Shweta
- Shraddha Kaul as Begum
- Amit Anand Raut as Salim
- Meghan Jadhav as Kabeer
- Vansh Sayani as Younis
- Pooja Gor

== Reception ==
In her review, Archika Khurana of Times of India praised the acting performances, stating, "Adrishyam: The Invisible Heroes' introduces viewers to the dynamic duo of Ravi Verma and Parvati Sehgal, who navigate the treacherous waters of espionage while juggling their familial responsibilities. Eijaz Khan and Divyanka Tripathi Dahiya shine in their roles, portraying agents burdened with the weight of secrecy and the constant threat of exposure."
