= Amardeep Jha =

Indian actress

- Born: Bhagalpur, Bihar
- Occupations: Actress, Television Presenter
- Years active: 1991–present
- Children: Shriya Jha

Amardeep Jha is an Indian actress and television personality.

== Personal life ==
Jha lost her husband very early in her married life and her daughter Shriya Jha is an actress.

== Career ==
Jha began her profession with the serial Amanat in 1997, in which she assumed the part of Amit's mom. Her film debut was in the year 1998 where she acted as Jaya in Dushman.

== Filmography ==
=== Films ===
Year	Show	Role	Notes
1998	Dushman	Jaya	
1998	Train to Pakistan		
1998	Zakhm		
2001	Lajja	Ammaa	
2002	Devdas	Kali's mother	
2003	Satta	Vivek Chauhan's mother	
2004	Aetbaar	Mrs. Trivedi	
2004	American Daylight	Sue's Mother	English film
2005	White Rainbow	Roop	
2005	Naina	Somabai	
2007	Amal	Radha Kumar	Canadian drama/Hindi film
2009	3 Idiots	Mrs. Rastogi	
2011	Murder 2	Reshma's mother	
2014	PK	Jaggu's mother	
2019	Bombay Rose	Mrs D'Souza	
2019	Jai Mummy Di	Shruti's Mother	
2021	Mimi	Amma	
2023	Dunki	Manu's Mother	
2026	Satluj	Satnam's Mother	

=== Television ===
Year	Show	Role
1997-2002	Amanat	Amit's mother
2001	Hamare Tumhare	Ketan's mother
2003–2004	Awaz - Dil Se Dil Tak	Harjeet Singh's Wife
2004–2006	Reth	Devyani's mother
2005–2007	Sinndoor Tere Naam Ka	Chitralekha
2006–2007	Jabb Love Hua	Kaushalya
2007-2008	Jamegi Jodi.com	Grandmother
2007–2010	Sapna Babul Ka...Bidaai	Sumitra Naani
2008	Baa Bahoo Aur Baby	Mai(Cameo)
2009–2018	Yeh Rishta Kya Kehlata Hai	Shankari Tai
2009–2010	Maat Pitaah Ke Charnon Mein Swarg	Mehru Chachi, grandmotherly figure for Shubh
2010	Mera Naam Karegi Roshan	Bhisma's aunt
2011	Ek Hazaaron Mein Meri Behna Hai	Daljeet Singh Vadhera
2011-2013	Kuch Toh Log Kahenge	Nurse D'Souza
2012-2013	Amrit Manthan	Rajmata Manpreet Kaur Sodhi
2012-2013	Lakhon Mein Ek	
2014	Balika Vadhu	Suhasini: an old woman who was abandoned by her own son
2015-2016	Ishq Ka Rang Safed	Dadi Bua
2015-2016	Sumit Sambhal Lega	Santosho
2017-2018	Meri Durga	Santo, Durga's Dadi
2018-2019	Nazar	Priestess Jayanti Kabra/ Guru Maa– Naman's mother
2019	Band Baja Bandh Darwaza	
2019-2020	Yeh Rishtey Hain Pyaar Ke	Shankari Tai
2020-2021	Durga – Mata Ki Chhaya	Durga's Dadi
2023–2024	Teri Meri Doriyaann	Japjyot Akaal Singh Brar
2026–present	Tu Hi Re Dil Mein	Baa
