= Tera Mera Tedha Medha =

- Film poster
- तेरा मेरा टेढ़ा मेढ़ा
- Directed by: Chittaranjan Tripathy
- Written by: Chittaranjan Tripathy
- Produced by: Sanjiv Chopra
- Starring: See below
- Cinematography: Sanjeev Mohapatra
- Edited by: Rajendra K. Mahapatra; Virendra Gharse
- Music by: Chittaranjan Tripathy; Kashish Sharma (background score)
- Production company: Nakshatra Slim Films
- Distributed by: Nakshatra Slim Films
- Release date: 11 September 2015
- Country: India
- Language: Hindi

Tera Mera Tedha Medha (Hindi: तेरा मेरा टेढ़ा मेढ़ा English: Your my sinuous) is an Indian 2015 Bollywood romantic comedy film directed by Chittaranjan Tripathy and produced by Sanjiv Chopra under the Nakshatra Slim Films banner. The film was released on 11 September 2015. The film didn't performed very well at the box office.

== Cast ==
- Saroj Parida
- Rahul Bagga
- Geetika Tyagi
- Rajesh Sharma
- Reema Vorah
- Chittaranjan Tripathy
- Neeraj Sood

== Plot ==
Tera Mera Tedha Medha is quirky-topsy-turvy romantic comedy influenced by Planetary Disposition. It is a love story of two young struggling painters.
