= Raghupati Raghav Rajaram =

2015 Indian Odia-language film

- Directed by: Sudhansu Mohan
- Produced by: Sitaram Agrawal
- Starring: Siddhanta Mahapatra; Riya Dey
- Production company: Sarthak Films
- Release date: 28 August 2015
- Country: India
- Language: Odia

Raghupati Raghav Rajaram is an Indian Odia-language drama film directed by Sudhanshu Mohan and produced by Sitaram Agarwal under the Sarthak film banner. The film debuts three new actresses: Debasmita Panda, Tapaswi Mishra and Monisha Samantaray. They were selected from the talent-hunting reality show Mu bi heroine hebi, organised by Sarthak Music.

== Plot ==
The plot begins with Raghupati, a young man recovering in a mental facility after suffering from severe anxiety before an important exam. Flashbacks reveal his experience in the facility and the bullying he endured. Despite these challenges, Raghupati finds solace in the support of his mother, who helps him set up a wedding card business.

The story shifts to the present day, where Raghupati and his mother visit a potential bride, Ranjita, for an arranged marriage. Raghupati, who has a slight stammer, openly shares his past with her, including his time in the mental facility and his anxiety issues. Despite his honesty and vulnerability, Ranjita politely declines, leading to a series of rejections for Raghupati, who struggles with his insecurities.

One day, Raghupati meets Vidya, another woman with whom a marriage is arranged. However, on their wedding day, Vidya flees, and Raghupati takes the blame to protect her father from a tarnished reputation. The next day, Vidya's father visits Raghupati, assuring him that he considers him like a son and will help him find the right partner.

Feeling despondent, Raghupati continues with his wedding card business. During a moment of distraction, he nearly has an accident, but a blind man named Raghav Anand saves him. The two share a coffee, and Raghav tells Raghupati his own love story. Raghav, a radio jockey, reveals how his wife, Sunaina, fell in love with him through his radio show, unaware of his blindness. Their relationship grew as Sunaina, who worked at a music shop, eventually recognized him after they reconnected on the airwaves. Sunaina’s love for Raghav grew despite his insecurities, and they eventually married.

Inspired by Raghav's story, Raghupati begins to see life differently. He agrees to go with Vidya's father to meet another potential bride. During their journey, they encounter Vidya again, who is now pregnant and whose husband is in jail. Raghupati helps her, and while in the hospital, he unexpectedly meets Ranjita again, who now works as a cashier.

As events unfold, Raghupati learns more about love, sacrifice, and personal growth. He helps Vidya's father forgive her, and though he initially finds himself drawn to the girl he was supposed to meet, he realizes that the auto-rickshaw driver, who had once admired the same girl from afar, truly loved her. This realization pushes Raghupati to reflect on his own feelings for Ranjita, leading to a series of interactions with her.

After a misunderstanding with a police officer prospect, Raghupati and Ranjita's relationship deepens when she confesses her feelings toward him. Raghupati reciprocates, and the two get married, marking the culmination of his emotional and personal growth.

== Cast ==
- Siddhanta Mahapatra
- Debashish Patra
- Pupindar Singh
- Debasmita Panda
- Tapaswi Mishra
- Monisha Samantray
- Riya Dey
- Mihir Das
