= Dhauli Express =

Train in India

Overview
- Service type: Superfast
- Locale: Odisha & West Bengal
- First service: 30 October 1988; 37 years ago
- Current operator: East Coast Railways

Route
- Termini: Howrah (HWH); Puri (PURI)
- Stops: 14
- Distance travelled: 497 km (309 mi)
- Average journey time: 8h45min as 12821 and 9h as 12822
- Service frequency: Daily
- Train number: 12821 / 12822

On-board services
- Classes: AC Chair Car (CC) and Second seating (2S)
- Seating arrangements: Yes
- Sleeping arrangements: No
- Catering facilities: onboard catering
- Baggage facilities: Upper racks

Technical
- Rolling stock: LHB coach
- Track gauge: 1,676 mm (5 ft 6 in)
- Operating speed: 130 km/h
Route map
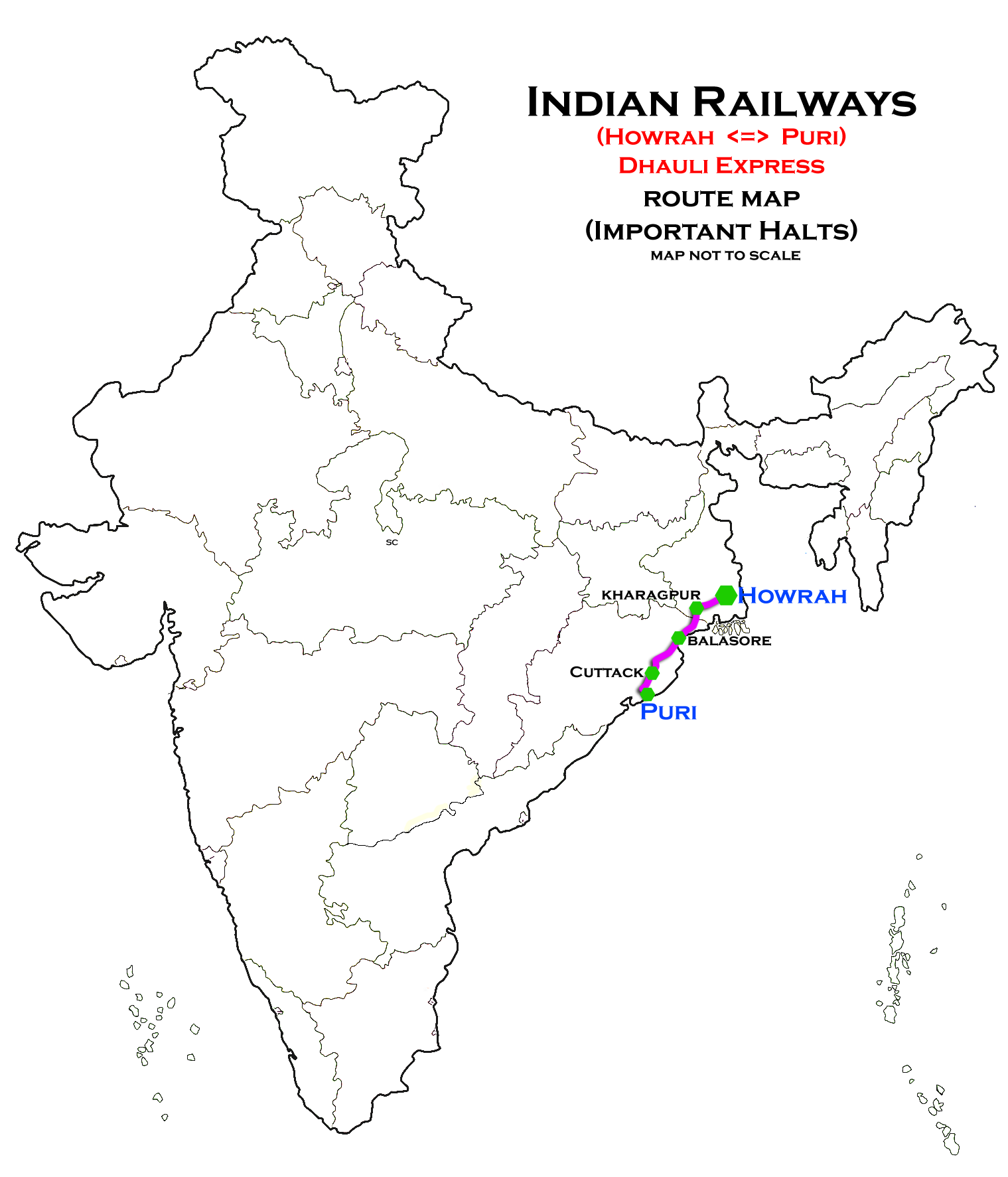

The 12821 / 12822 Dhauli Express is a daily train service between Puri of Odisha and Howrah in West Bengal. This train has 20 coaches.

== Train description ==
The 2007 Odia language film Dhauli Express starring Samaresh Routray, Mihir Das and Aparajita Mohanty, Siddhanta Mahapatra, Hari takes its name from the train. The train has an average speed of around 56 km/h with halts, so it's ticket includes a superfast charge. The train runs jam-packed throughout the year. Earlier it used to run from Howrah Jn.
