= Dhauli Express (film) =

2007 Indian Odia-language film

- Theatrical poster
- Directed by: Chittaranjan Tripathy
- Written by: Chittaranjan Tripathy
- Produced by: Chittaranjan Tripathy, Srinivash Routray
- Starring: Samaresh Routray; Siddhanta Mahapatra; Anu Choudhury; Mihir Das; Aparajita Mohanty
- Cinematography: Aviram Mishra
- Edited by: Sushant Mani
- Release date: 2007
- Country: India
- Language: Odia

Dhauli Express is a 2007 Indian Odia-language film written and directed by Chittaranjan Tripathy. It features Samaresh Routray, Mihir Das, Siddhanta Mahapatra, Anu Choudhury, Aparajita Mohanty. The film was produced by Chittaranjan Triparthy. It won the Odisha State Film Award for Best Film in 2007. The film's title is based on the train of the same name.

== Cast ==
- Siddhanta Mahapatra as Jaga Bhai
- Samaresh Routray as Dhauli Das
- Mihir Das as Dibkar Das
- Aparajita Mohanty as Dhauli's mother
- Anu Choudhury as Tila
- Harihar Mahapatra as Pacha

== Plot ==
Dhauli Express portrays an ambitious youth "Dhauli" (Samaresh Routray), Son of Dibakar Das (Mihir Das), who is a post man. Dhauli wants to become a singer. but due to odd circumstances of life he gets involved with Jaga bhai (Siddhanta Mahapatra) into crime world for money.

== Soundtrack ==
The Music for the film is composed by Chittaranjan Tripathy

Song	Lyrics	Singer(s)
Smruti anka banka nai	Chittaranjan Tripathy	Chittaranjan Tripathy
Dura tale bane	Chittaranjan Tripathy	Chittaranjan Tripathy
Sandhya hele mane pade	Chittaranjan Tripathy	Sachin, Chittaranjan Tripathy
Manisha jibana	Utkalamani Gopabandu Das	Chittaranjan Tripathy
Chalak chalak jaye	-	Taranum
