= Sambit =

Sambit is an Indian masculine given name. Notable people with the name include:

- Sambit Patra (born 1974), Indian politician and surgeon
- Sambit Routray, Indian politician
