= Sidharth TV =

Indian Odia-language TV channel

- Country: India
- Broadcast area: India
- Network: Sidharth TV Network
- Headquarters: Bhubaneswar, Odisha, India

Programming
- Language: Odia

Ownership
- Owner: Sitaram Agrawal & Namita Agrawal
- Sister channels: Sidharth Gold; Sidharth Utsav; Jay Jagannath TV; 91.9 Sidharth FM

History
- Launched: 15 May 2021; 5 years ago

Links
- Website: sidharthtvnetwork.com/sidharthtv

Sidharth TV is an Odia language General Entertainment Channel in Odisha, India, which was launched on 15 May 2021 along with 2 other channels - Sidharth Gold & Sidharth Bhakti. The fourth channel of this group is "Jay Jagannath TV" which has been launched in May 2022. , owned by the parent company - Sidharth TV Network.

The chairman of the company is Sitaram Agrawal, who has been involved in the Odia Media Industry since the last 4 decades. In 2010 he founded Sarthak TV which he sold to Zee TV group in 2015, now it is Zee Sarthak. He is also founder of Sarthak Music & Sidharth Television Network. Sidharth TV is the flagship channel of the group ‘Sidharth TV Network’.

== About group ==
- Sidharth TV Network is the parent company which operates Sidharth TV, Sidharth Bhakti, Sidharth Gold & Jay Jagannath TV, all of which are premium subscription based channels.
1. Sidharth TV is the flagship channel of the company, which is a premium GEC Channel featuring content such as Daily Soaps, and Reality shows, as well as wide range of popular content such as odia movies and musical shows.
2. Sidharth Utsav is the devotional channel of the company, which features a wide range of devotional content like spiritual discourses, folk and religious content like Pala, Bharat Leela, spiritual reality shows, Astrological, Discourses, as well as Devotional music.
3. Sidharth Gold is a channel that features Movies, Music, and Jatra, featuring a wide variety of Musical and Entertaining shows.
4. Jay Jagannath TV is a channel completely dedicated to Lord Jagannath, featuring live darshan from Jagannath Puri and spiritual shows on Lord Jagannath & which is 1st ad free television channel of Odisha.
- Also an FM station at Bhubaneswar/Cuttack twin city in the name of 91.9 Sidharth FM Started in the year 2017.

== Current programming ==
=== Original Shows ===
Premiere date	Title	Time of telecast
12 February 2024	Maya O Mamata	Mon-Sat 7 PM
12 February 2024	Sunayana Ra Suna Jhia	Mon-Sat 7:30 PM
12 February 2024	Bhagya Kheluchi Sindura Khela	Mon-Sat 8 PM
12 February 2024	Tu Mo Kedara Mu To Gouri	Mon-Sat 8:30 PM

=== Reality shows ===
Premiere date	Title	Time of telecast
18 May 2026	Odisha Ra Nua Swara 2026	Mon-Wed 9 PM
2 July 2026	Tike Dance Tike Acting - Season 5	Thu-Sat 9 PM

== Former programming ==
=== Original Shows ===
Year	Title
2021-2022	Mangula Kanya
2022	Jay Maa Laxmi
2022-2024	Aparajita
2022-2024	Mangula Ra Bhagya
2023	Mechanic Didi
2024	Sindura Nuhen Khela Ghara
2024-2026	Kedara Gouri
2024-2026	Sinduur Khella

=== Reality shows ===
Year	Title
2021	Mu Bi Namita Agrawal Hebi
2021	Odisha Ra Nua Swara Jr
2021	Raja Sundari 2021
2021	Sampurnna Laxmi
2021	Tike Dance Tike Acting
2022	Bhakti Kantha
2022	Debadasi
2022	Mu Bi Namita Agrawal Hebi Season 2
2022	Naach Odisha For Mothers
2022	Odisha Ra Nua Swara Sr
2022	Raja Sundari 2022
2022	Sampurnna Laxmi 2022
2022-2023	Sidharth Antakhyari
2022-2023	Swara Laxmi
2023	Bhakti Kantha Junior
2023	Debadasi Season 2
2023	Mu Bi Namita Agrawal Hebi Mahamilana
2023	Naach Odisha Season 2
2023	Raja Sundari 2023
2023	Sampurnna Laxmi 2023
2023	Tike Dance Tike Acting Season 2
2023-2024	Odisha Ra Nua Swara Jr 2023
2023-2024	Tike Dance Tike Acting Season 3
2024	Debadasi Season 3
2024	Maharanee
2024	Mu Bi Namita Agrawal Hebi 2024
2024	Naach Odisha
2024	Raja Sundari 2024
2024	Sidharth Parivara Mahasangram
2024-2025	Sampurnna Laxmi 2024
2024-2025	Swara Mahasangram
2025	Debadasi - Season 4
2025	Mu Bi Namita Agrawal Hebi - Season 4
2025	Naach Odisha - Ethara Nachibe Maa
2025	Odisha Ra Nua Swara - Season 4
2025	Raja Sundari - Season 5
2025	Tike Dance Tike Acting - Season 4
2025-2026	Naach Odisha - Season 5
2025-2026	Sampurnna Laxmi - Season 5
2026	Bhakti Kantha Junior 2026
2026	Raja Sundari 2026

=== Game shows ===
Year	Title
2021	Bedabyasa
2021	Bhajan Padyantari

== Programming ==
=== Original series ===
Aparajitaa
Bhagya Kheluchi Sindura Khela
Jay Maa Laxmi
Kedara Gouri
Mangula Kanya
Mangula Ra Bhagya
Maya O Mamata
Mechanic Didi
Sindura Nuhen Khela Ghara
Sinduur Khella
Sunayana
Tu Mo Kedara Mu To Gouri

=== Reality shows ===
Bhakti Kantha : devotional singer haunt reality show
Bhakti Kantha Junior
Debadasi : semi classical dance talent search reality show
Maharanee
Mun Bi Namita Agrawal Hebi : singing reality show
Naach Odisha For Mothers : dancer haunt reality show for married women
Naach Odisha
Odisha Ra Nua Swara Jr : singing talent search reality show
Odisha Ra Nua Swara Sr : singing talent search reality show for seniors
Raja Sundari : cultural talent hunt
Sampurnna Laxmi : housewife talent search reality show
Sidharth Antakhyari
Sidharth Paribara Mahasangram
Swara Laxmi
Swara Mahasangram
Tike Dance Tike Acting : dance and acting talent search reality show

=== Game shows ===
Bedabyasa (Spiritual Quiz)
Padyantari (Musical Rounds)

=== Music programs ===
Jalsha odia songs
This is Maya Re Baya comedy dose

=== Spiritual programs ===
Aradhana (TV series)
Bhakti Chandana
Satya Pathe Ghenijao Mate

=== Jatra ===
Jatra Agana

=== Movies ===
Matinee Super Noon Show
Saturday Night Show
Sunday Maha Movie

== Sister channels ==
Channel	Category	Launch	SD/HD availability
Sidharth TV	General Entertainment	2021	SD
Sidharth Gold	Movies, Music & Jatra	2021	SD
Sidharth Utsav	Spiritual	2021	SD
Jay Jagannath TV	Spiritual	2022	SD
Jay Jagannath TV (Hindi)	Spiritual	2025	SD
Sidharth Music	Music	TBA	SD

== See also ==
- List of Odia-language television channels
- List of longest-running Indian television series
