= Somesh Mathur =

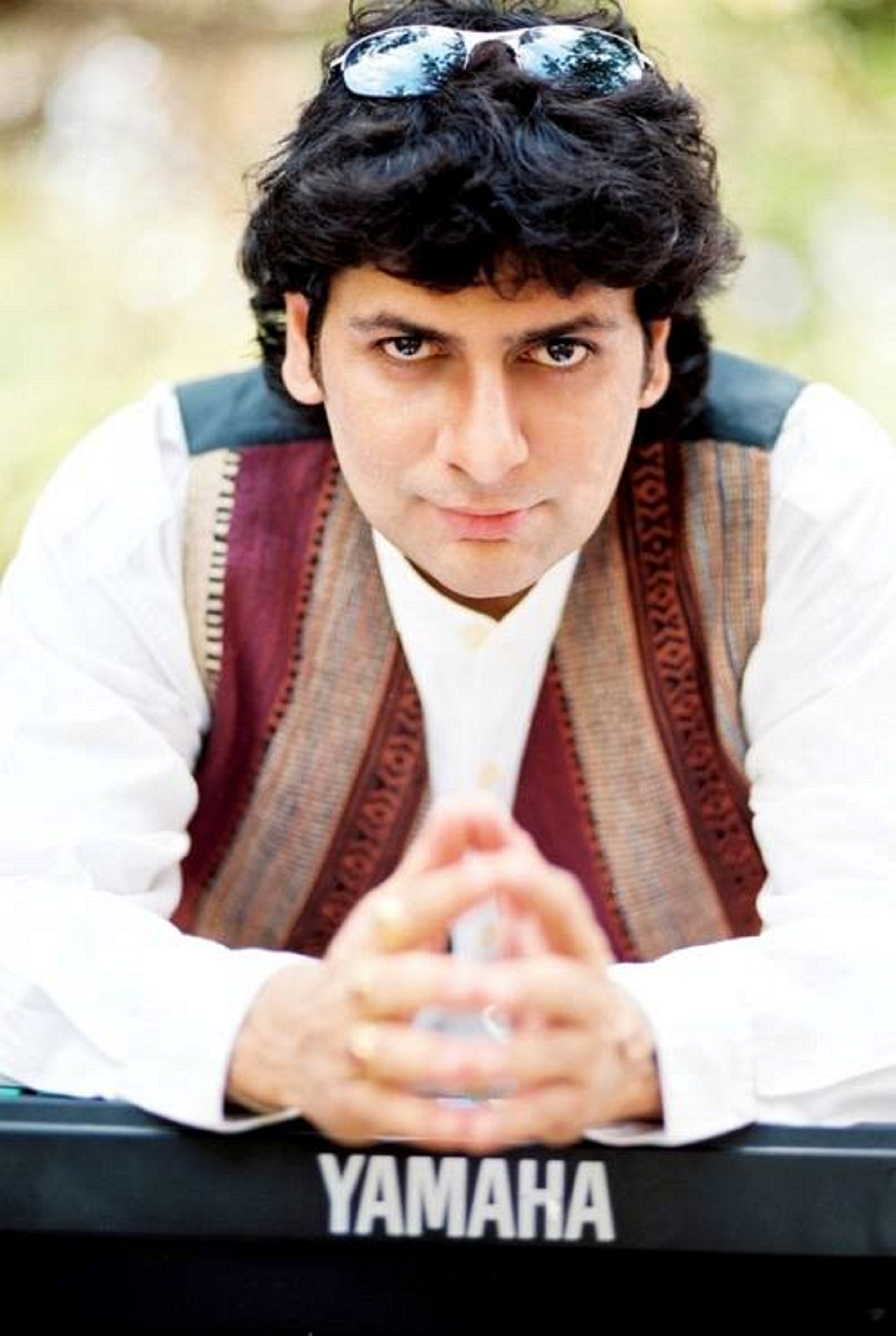

Background information
- Born: 1977 (age 48–49); Bandra, Mumbai, India

Somesh Mathur (born in 1977) is an Indian singer, songwriter, and music producer.

== Career ==
Somesh Mathur has released 21 albums and 43 music videos, including 'Ghalib', 'Jai Ganesha', 'Shiva Shlokas', 'Radhai Ram Radhai Shyam', and "Time Stood Still". He has composed over 200 songs and performed in over 1600 concerts worldwide. He also received the MTV Video Music Award (2005–2006) for his album with Asha Bhosle, Asha - A Brand New Album, for the song "Aaj Jaane Ki Zid Na Karo". He is the first Indian to be inducted as a mentor and a voting member at the Recording Academy, an American learned academy of musicians, producers, and other musical professionals.
