= Arabinda =

Arabinda is an Indian given masculine name. Notable people with the name include:

- Arabinda Dhali, Indian politician
- Arabinda Ghosh (born 1925), Indian politician
- Arabinda Muduli (born 1961), Indian musician, singer, and lyricist
- Arabinda Rajkhowa (born 1956), Indian politician
