= Mo Dil To Deewana =

- Directed by: Alka Nanda
- Distributed by: Alka Infomedia
- Release date: 1 January 2013
- Country: India
- Language: Odia

Mo Dil To Deewana is an Oriya film released on 1 January 2013 in Odisha, India. This film is based on romantic love story directed by Alka Nanda.

== Cast ==
- Kajal
- Asrumochan Mohanty
