= Badhu Nuhen Mu Bandhu =

2013 Indian Odia-language film

- Directed by: Sailendra Parida
- Screenplay by: Sailendra Parida
- Story by: Sabita Sahoo
- Produced by: Kirti Ranjan Choudhary
- Starring: Prabhas, Bidusmita, Uttam Mohanty, Hara Pattnaik, Snigdha Mohanty
- Music by: Arun Mantri, Jitendra Pradhan, Nijam
- Distributed by: RCL Entertainment
- Release date: 1 January 2013
- Country: India
- Language: Odia

Badhu Nuhen Mu Bandhu is a 2013 Indian Odia film directed by Sailendra Parida and starring newcomer Bidusmita.

== Cast ==
- Bidusmita
- Hara Patnaik
- Uttam Mohanty
- Pintu Nanda
- Munna Khan

== Soundtrack ==
1. Megha Malhara
2. Bandhu Nuhe Mu Badhu (title song)
3. Aee Ghara Sri Mandira
4. Sathire Sathire Khojuchi
5. Muna To Chora Prema
