= Luchakali =

2012 Indian Odia-language film

- Poster
- Directed by: Susant Mani
- Written by: Susant Mani
- Produced by: Nilakantha Das
- Starring: Babushaan; Shriya Jha; Samaresh Routray; Ajit Das; Bijay Mohanty
- Cinematography: Abhiram Mishra
- Edited by: Biren Mohanty
- Music by: Anbu Selvam
- Production company: Chakadola Production
- Distributed by: Chakadola Production
- Release date: 30 March 2012
- Running time: 142 (min)
- Country: India
- Language: Odia

Luchakali (English: Hide and seek) is an Odia drama and thriller film released on 30 March 2012. It features Babushaan, Shriya Jha, Samaresh Routray and Ajit Das in key roles with original music by Anbu Selvam. It is a remake of the 1996 Bengali film Bhoy.

== Synopsis ==
Tanmay Mohanty (Babushan) is a sculpturist and deadly love with Monalisa Das (Sherya Jha). Tanmay is an orphan and Monalisa takes care of everything in the life of Tanmay. Oneday Monalisa's father become blind in an accident. To manage the poor financial condition of the family, Monalisa's step-mother agrees to the marriage proposal by one Kalidas Patnaik (Samaresh Routray) with Monalisa with a consideration of heavy amount offered by Kalidas. Kalidas ia poet and has obsessive-compulsive personality disorder symptoms. After Kalidas's marriage with Monalisa, he tries to torture her a lot. While they are traveling in a boat, Monalisa escapes by jumping into water.

Kalidas tries to search Monalisa everywhere but can't find her. in the meanwhile Tanmay rescue Monalisa from water and keeps her in a secret place. Meanwhile, he tries to take revenge upon Kalidas. When Kalidas with the help of Police Inspector Mohan (Bijay Mohanty) traces their whereabouts, Tanmay and Monalisa escapes from the scene. At last when Kalidas tries to kill Monalisa, Tanmay reaches the scene, saves Monalisa by killing Kalidas.

== Cast ==
- Babushaan as Tanmay Mohanty, a Sand Artist [Monalisa's friend, well wisher, and turned love interest][Main Protagonist]
- Shriya Jha as Monalisa Das, a Book Seller [Tanmaye's friend, and love interest]
- Samaresh Routray as Kalidas Patnaik, a Poet [Ruchi's husband, Monalisa's enemy] [Main Antagonist]
- Bijay Mohanty as Police Inspector Mohan Das [Former Antagonist, turned into Protagonist]
- Ajit Das as Das Babu [Monalisa's father]
- Bikash Das as Nira Kakei, servant in Kalidase's house, turned well-wisher of Monalisa
- Shweta Acharya as Monalisa's stepmother
- Ankita Bhowmick as Juni, Monalisa's step sister
- Megha Ghosh as Ruchi, Kalidas's wife [Special appearance in an item number]
- Elina as Rupa, Monalisa's friend and well wisher [Guest appearance]

== filming ==
The film is shot at various locations of Bhubaneswar, Cuttack and Dhenkanal.

== Review ==
The film generally received positive reviews from critics especially for Samaresh Routray. FullOrissa gave it 3 out of 5 and commented "It seems like Samaresh has shared this script with Susant Mani only for winning an award in the next upcoming celebrity award shows. Susant Mani as usual have done a great job in Luchakali. The movie is technically well driven, The Thrillers in this movie are one of its type in Oriya Movie Industry. ". Odisha Today mentioned " Director Susant Mani, who is also written the script, made few experiment in the plot to give a different taste, a suspense thriller." The New Indian Express quoted "The movie has a lot of special effects to keep the thrill quotient up. Even as the movie scores high on technical aspects, there are some loose ends to the music. Compared to Sushant’s previous hit Chocolate, the music in Luchakali is slow. The film’s music has been scored by Anbu Selvan who happens to be the guitarist of A R Rahman. Goodly Rath’s soulful musical touch in Sushant’s Chocolate is missing this time."

== Soundtrack ==
The Music for the film is composed by Anbu Selvam

Song	Lyrics	Singer(s)
Gumsum Gumsum Akhi Tora	Bapu Goswami	Ratikant Satapathy, Tapu Misra
A Deha Barafa re	Bapu Goswami	Samaresh Routray, Mahalaxmi Iyer
Luha Sathe Bandhana	Bapu Goswami	Babushan, Tapu Misra
Akasharu Kichhi Megha Ani	Bapu Goswami	Babushan, Tapu Misra
Luchakali (title song)	Bapu Goswami	Ritu Pathak

== Box office ==
The film did not well in the box office and was declared a disaster.

== Awards ==
- 4th Tarang Cine Awards 2013
  - Best Actor in negative role-Samaresh Routray
  - Best Actress in negative role-Shweta Acharya
  - Best Cinematographer - Abhiram Mishra
- Etv Oriya Film Awards 2013
  - Best Oriya Film (Nominated)
  - Best Director(Nominated)- Sushant Mani
  - Best Actor in negative role(Nominated)-Samaresh Routray
