= Subhashree =

Subhashree is a given name. Notable people with the name include:

- Subhashree Ganguly (born 1990), Indian actress
- Subhashree Singh (born 2006), Indian kho kho player
