= Yukta =

Yukta Юкта Ust-Ilimpeya (until 1931)
- Settlement (posyolok)
- Interactive map of Yukta
- Coordinates: 63°23′00″N 105°39′08″E
- Country: Russia
- Krai: Krasnoyarsk Krai
- Municipal district: Evenkiysky
- Rural settlement: Yukta
- Founded: 1923

Area
  - Total: 0.80 km^{2} (0.31 sq mi)
- Elevation: 612 m (2,008 ft)

Population (2021)
  - Total: 88
- Time zone: UTC+7 (KRAT)
- Postal code: 648372
- Telephone code: +39173

Yukta is a village in the Evenki District of Krasnoyarsk Krai. The village of Yukta forms the rural settlement and is the only populated area within it. It belongs to the Ilimpiyskaya group of settlements.

== Geography ==
It is located on the left bank of the Nizhnyaya Tunguska River, 7 km upstream from the mouth of the Ilimpeya River. The name Yukta (Evenki: Ю̄ктэ) means "spring" in Evenki.

== History ==
The settlement, formerly known as Ust-Ilimpey, was founded in 1923. At that time, it was part of the Katangsky District of the Irkutsk Region. Then, the need arose to annex the Evenki group serving the Ust-Ilimpey trading post, along with the territory they were developing, to the Evenki National Okrug. This occurred in 1931. A branch of the Turinskaya Secondary Boarding School named after Alitet Nikolaevich Nemtushkin, the Yuktinskaya Elementary School and Kindergarten, operates in the settlement.

== Local government ==
Date of election: September 8, 2024. Term of office: 5 years. Number of deputies: 7. Chairperson of the Council: Olga Eduardovna Alekseeva.

Faction	Number of deputies
United Russia	6
Self-nomination	1
