= Most Wanted (2011 film) =

2011 Indian Odia-language film

- Directed by: Sushant Mani
- Screenplay by: Sushant Mani
- Story by: Muna Patra
- Produced by: Prabhas Rout
- Starring: Anubhav Mohanty, Megha Ghosh and Mihir Das
- Cinematography: Sitansu Mohapatra
- Music by: Goodly Rath
- Release date: 14 January 2011
- Country: India
- Language: Odia

Most Wanted is a 2011 Odia film directed by Sushant Mani.

== Plot ==
An innocent Abhay Mohanty comes to city with dreams of a decent job and a beautiful life. In circumstances he has to fight the local goons. His ambitions leads him to the criminal world. He becomes Baba, the Don of the dons. He becomes the most wanted in police file.

== Cast ==
- Anubhav Mohanty as Abhaya Mohanty / Baba
- Megha Ghosh as Monika James
- Mihir Das as Albert James
- Minaketan as Babu Bhai
- Pushpa Panda as Abhaya's mother
- Samaresh Routray as Mustaq Bhai
- Baisakhi Mohanty as Minu
- Papu Pam Pam as Computer Behera
- Jiban Panda as Babu Bhai's assistant
- Hara Rath as Topi
- Satwaki Mishra as Inspector M. Baxi

== Soundtrack ==
The music rights of the film were acquired by Pabitra Entertainment. The music of the film is composed by Goodly Rath while the lyrics are penned Mohit Chakraborty and Bapu Goswami.

No.	Title	Lyrics	Singer(s)	Length
1.	"Bele Bele Jibana"	Mohit Chakraborty	Krishna Beura	5:08
2.	"Bidi Chhad Sanga Ebe"	Bapu Goswami	Bibhu Kishore	4:12
3.	"Chhati Tale Thae Jane"	Bapu Goswami	Javed Ali, Tapu Mishra	5:14
4.	"Chupi Chupi Bele Bele"	Mohit Chakraborty	Javed Ali, Tapu Mishra	4:32
5.	"Life Ta Sara Ethi Game"	Bapu Goswami	Sunidhi Chauhan	4:31
Total length:				23:37
