= Riya Dey =

Indian actress

- Swarnali Dey
- Born: 12 October 1991 (age 35); Balasore, Odisha, India
- Occupations: Actress, Model
- Years active: 2010-Present

Swarnali Dey, also known as Riya Dey, is an Indian actress, model and television personality known for her work in Odia films. Her numerous accolades include an Odisha State Film Award for Prema Adhei Akhyara.

== Personal life ==
Riya Dey was born as Swarnali Dey on 12 October 1991 in Balasore, Odisha, India. During her 10+2 studies, she received her first film "Prema Adhei Akhyara". Riya has been trained in Odissi dance since childhood and is also a skilled dancer. Prior to her film career, she worked as a dancer.

== Filmography ==
Year	Film	Role	Notes
2010	Prema Adhei Akhyara		Debut film
2011	Ghayal Yodha		Debut Bhojpuri film
2011	Criminal		
2012	Emiti Bi Prema Hue		
2012	Idiot: I Do Ishq Only Tumse		
2012	Love Master		
2013	Hari Om Hari		
2013	Dharma		
2013	Tu Mo Dehara Chai		
2014	Golapi Golapi		
2014	Pagala Karichu Tu		
2015	College Time		
2015	Raghupati Raghav Rajaram		
2015	Kalki		
2016	Tu Je Sei		
2016	Chup Chup Chori Chori		
2016	Tora Dine Ku Mora Dine		
2017	Katha Deli Matha Chuin		
2018	Diwana Heli To Pain		
2019	Prema Pain Mahabharata		
2019	Premare Rakhichi 100 Ru 100		
2021	Rati Sari Sari Jauchi		
2022	Hau Hau Heigala Re		
2022	Lage Prema Najara		
2022	Sesa Rati		
2022	Kichi Kahibara Achi		
2022	To Naa Ra Mane Han		
2023	Bandini		
2023	Twins		
2023	Lagila Ranga Golapi Golapi		
2023	Katak: Sesa Ru Arambha		Special appearance in the song "Rangalata"
2024	Robbery		
2024	Durga		Special appearance in the song "Pritam Pyaare"
2025	Miss Call Friend		
2026	Pabitra Bandhana		
