= Kavya Keeran =

Indian actress and model

- Occupation: Actress
- Years active: 2015–present
- Height: 5 ft 6 in (168 cm)
- Awards: Odisha State Film Awards, 2019; Odisha State Film Awards, 2020

Kavya Keeran is an Indian actress and model who primarily works in Odia and Hindi films.

Keeran received the Odisha State Film Award for Best Actress for her performance in the Odia film Khusi in 2019. She later won the award again in the Best Actress category for her performance in the Odia film Sahid Raghu Sardar. In 2022, she appeared in the music video Tu Ki Kitta by Rishi Singh.

== Early life ==
Kavya Keeran was born in Bhubaneswar, Odisha.

== Career ==
During her early years, Kavya had a strong interest in music and trained in Indian classical. She was also passionate about theatre, which led her to join the classical Odissi dance and Theatre. She was very active in cultural activities during school and college.

== Filmography ==
Year	Film	Language	Role	Note
2017	Ram Ratan	Hindia		
2018	Rahasya	Odia	Indumati/Shruti	Dual Role
2019	Khusi	Odia		Best actress in Odisha State Film Awards, 2019
2021	Sahid Raghu Sardar	Odia	Wife of Raghu Sardar	Best actress in Odisha State Film Awards, 2020
2021	Bhoka	Odia	Hema	
2022	Ishqiyaat	Hindia		Short film
2025	Angel	Odia		

=== Web-series ===
Year	Title	Language	OTT Platform	Role	Note
2022	72 Hours	Odia	Tarang Plus		Web-series debut
2022	Exposed	Odia	Kanchalanka		
2026	Inspector Avinash 2	Hindi	Jio Hotstar	Shivangi	

== Awards and nominations ==
Year	Award	Category	Work	Result	Ref.
2019	Odisha State Film Awards	Best Actress	Khusi	Won	
2020	Odisha State Film Awards	Best Actress	Sahid Raghu Sardar	Won	
