= Susant Mani =

Indian film director

Sushant Mani
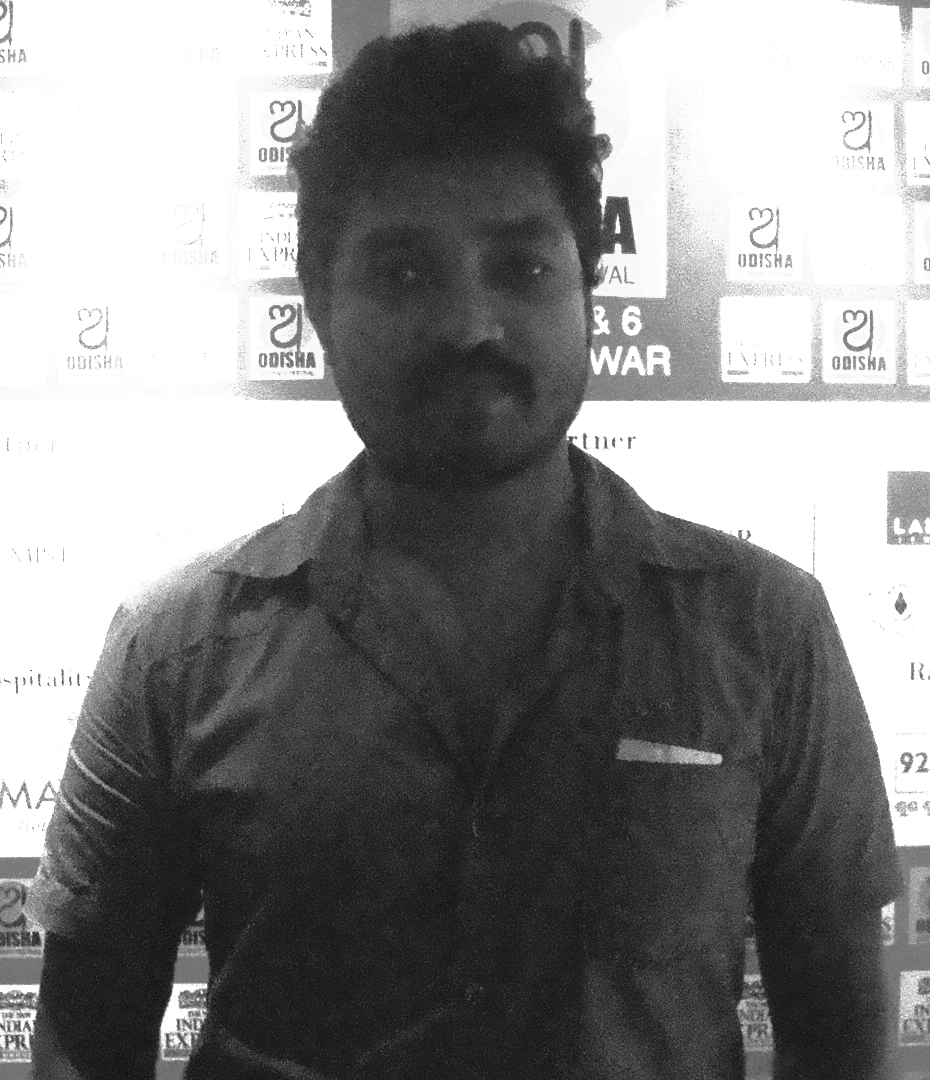
- Sushant Mani
- Occupation: Director
- Years active: 2009–present
- Children: 1

Sushant or Susant Mani is an Indian film director, working in the Odia film industry. He also works as an editor, writer and choreographer.

== Career ==
He started his career as an editor and director of album videos for sarthak music. After some albums he started to work in films as an editor and choreographer. He also has written the stories and screenplays of some of his films. He made his debut as director with the film Aa Janhare Lekhiba Naa. His recent work has shown an ambition to move into Ollywood filmmaking.

== Filmography ==
As Director:

- 2 Chocolate (2019)
- This Is ମାୟାରେ ବାୟା (2019)
- Nimki-nimpur ru nabin niwas (2019)
- Laila O Laila (2017) - remake of the Marathi movie Sairat
- Sapanara Pathe Pathe (2017)
- Tu Kahibu Na Mu (2016)
- Hello: In Love (2015)
- Kehi Nuhen Kahara (2015)
- Pagala Karichu Tu (2014)
- Lekhu Lekhu Lekhi Deli (2014)
- Golapi Golapi (2014)
- Akhire Akhire (2014) - remake of the Telugu movie Ishq
- Mu Eka Tumara (2013) - remake of the Kannada movie Chandra Chakori
- Luchakali (2012) - based on Sleeping with the Enemy
- Chocolate (2011) - remake of the Telugu movie Oy!
- Most Wanted (2011)
- Aama Bhitare Kichhi Achhi (2010)
- Abhimanyu (2009) - remake of the Tamil movie Chithiram Pesuthadi
- Aa Janhare Lekhiba Naa (2009)

== Honours and awards ==
- 2005- Odisha State Film Award for Best Editor - Shaashu Ghara Chaalijibi
- 2007- Odisha State Film Award for Best Editor - Mu Tate Love Karuchi
- 2015- Odisha State Film Award for Best Screenplay - Kehi Nuhe Kahara
