= Kuna Tripathy =

Indian (Odia) actor, Television Presenter and Politician

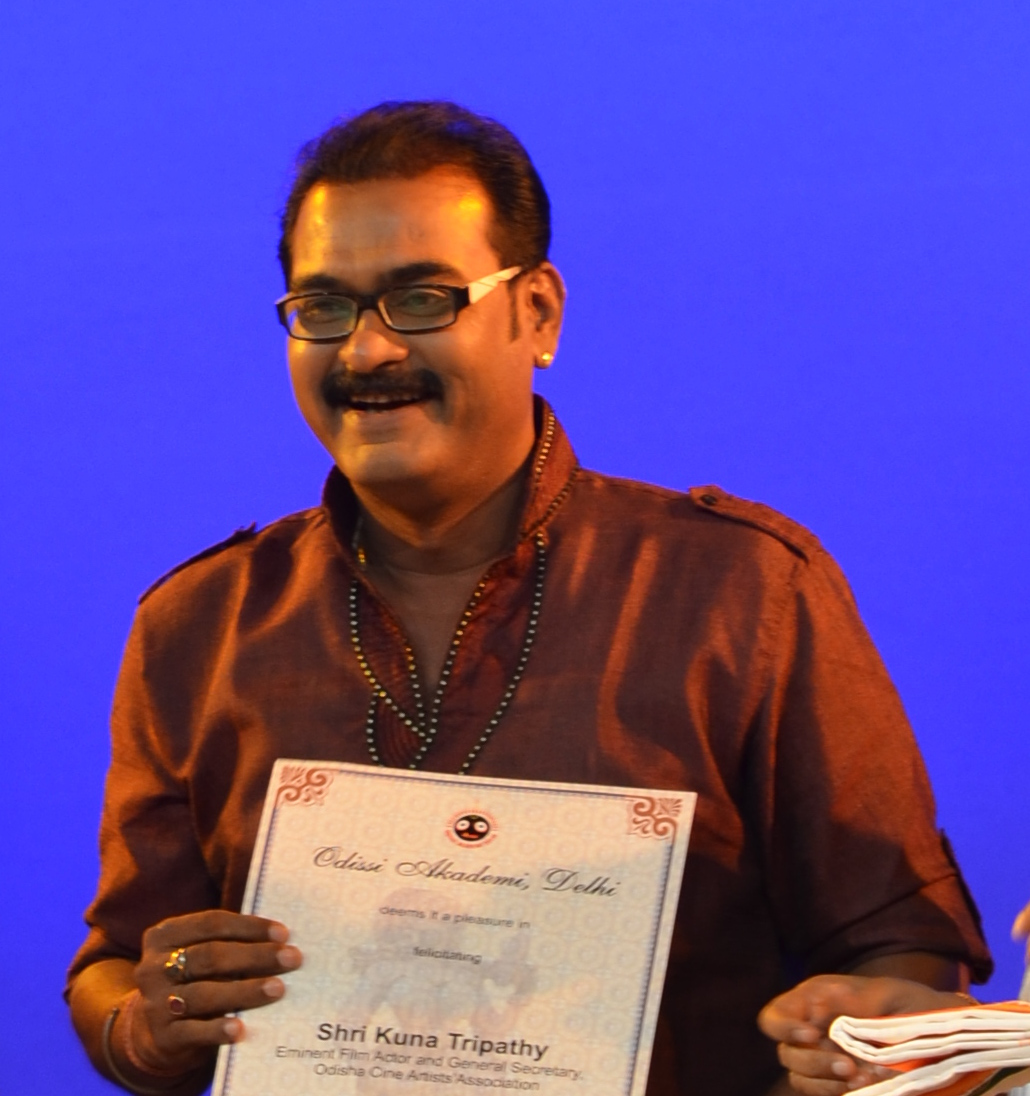
- At an event, Rabindra Bhaban, Bhubaneswar
- Occupations: Actor, radio personality, VJ (media personality), television presenter, politician
- Known for: Chair of Odisha Film Development Corporation
- Notable work: Regional Television show 'News Fuse'

Satyabrata Tripathy (Popular as Kuna Tripathy) is an Indian actor, radio personality, VJ (media personality) and television presenter, who mostly works on Odia language films and television shows. He is appointed as the chairman of Odisha Film Development Corporation by the Government of Odisha in 2018. He has worked in songwriting, scripting, and direction. He has also scripted and directed many docudramas, and telefilms.

== Career ==
Kuna Tripathy has acted in films like ‘Bandhu’, ‘Mo Dil Kahe Ilu Ilu’ and ‘Love Dot Com’. He worked as a radio artist on All India Radio (AIR), Cuttack. He earned fame with the Odia-language satirical show ‘News Fuse’, which is known as the best news spoof programme of Odisha.

Kuna Tripathy started his career at the age of 6 in a stage drama, and by that time he had also worked in Shishu Sansar (All India Radio). He has also worked in prominent radio stations of India such as All India Radio (Cuttack) & Vividh Bharati from the year1988 to 1999. In 1995, he participated in an Odia theatre drama, Satarka Sanghamitra of AIR which won the Best Play in India award.

He made his debut in the year 1987 through the Hindi movie 'Sopan'. Besides that, he has also appeared in other Odia movies such as 'Kiye Kahara' (1997), 'Maa Gojabayani' (1998), Lat Sahib, Rakata Chinhichi Nijara Kiye (1999 Superhit), Samaya Chakra Re Sansara Ratha, Nari Akhi Re Nia, Tate Mo Rana, Tu Mo Akhi Ra Tara, Dharma Ra Haba Jaye, Satyameva Jayate, Pila Ta Bigidi Gala, Tu Eka Mo Saha Bharasa, Prem Kumar. He has also acted in two Bengali movies: Bichu Chelly & Bhandhu.

== Political career ==
Tripathy joined the Biju Janata Dal party in 2016, who later appointed him as chair of the Odisha Film Development Corporation. BJD has historically accused 'News Fuse' for allegedly being anti-government and pro-BJP (Bharatiya Janata Party). As a result, when he was appointed as chair, he left the show.

== Television ==
Tripathy made his small screen debut in the year 1995 with the Odia Mega Serial, 'Kahuthile Saribani'. Along with that, he has played roles in some popular TV shows like Samparka, Duhita, Sara Akasha, Je Pakhi Ude Jete Dura, Dasi, Rajaniti and Tulasi.

He worked on the show News Fuse from 2008 until 2018, when he became the host of the satire show Bampha in Nandighosa TV.

== Personal life ==
Satyabrata "Kuna" Tripathy, born on 22 January 1968, completed his master's degree in Arts from Ravenshaw University. He has always paid respect to Late actor Parbati Ghose as his Guru and mother. Married to Sangeeta Tripathy, he has two daughters - Shreya & Shloka Tripathy.
