= Samaresh Routray =

Odia actor

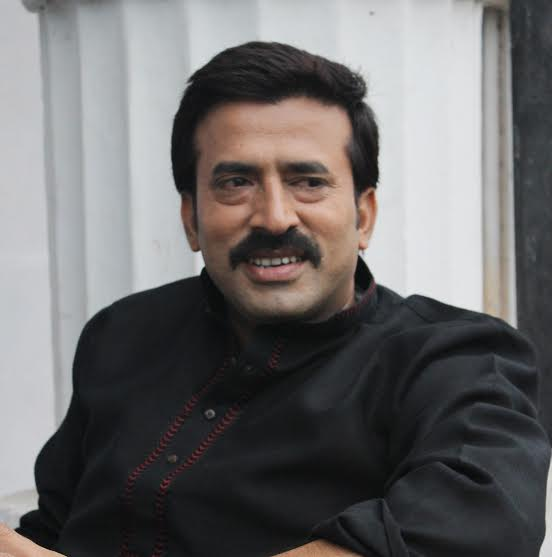

Director: Odiaone Entertainment

Personal details
- Born: 3 July 1979 (age 47) Bhubaneswar, Odisha, India
- Spouse: Premlatha Sahoo (2014.m)
- Education: National School of Drama, New Delhi
- Occupation: Actor, producer
- Website: www.samaresh.com

Samaresh Routray (born 3 July 1979) is a film actor, producer and television personality from Odisha. He is mostly known for the negative roles. He has been awarded as Best Actor In Negative Role many times, including 2 Tarang Cine Awards. He was awarded as Best Actor for NAMARD in 28th Odisha State Film Awards.

== Early life ==
Routray was born in Bhubaneswar, Odisha to Alekha Prasad Routray and Laxmipriya Routray. He is an alumnus of National School of Drama. He has done MBA in HR and Marketing.

== Filmography ==
Routray started his career with a Hindi feature film 23rd March 1931: Shaheed in 2002 where he played the role of Yaspal. After a gap of 4 years he made his debut in Odia film industry with Mo Suna Pua in 2006. Then he did Dhauli Express as a lead, which got the best film award in Odisha State Film Awards.

During the initial days, he worked in the small screen with popular Odia television serials like Uttardayee, Sanskaar, Khara Barsara Khela, Basundhara, and Debi.

In Mukhyamantri, he did an ambitious leader's role and with this film he started portraying villainous roles, which continued in Loafer (2011), Most Wanted, Luchakali (2012) and so on.

Routray has established a music company named Odiaone Entertainment and a film production house named S3 Movies. He became producer with the Luchakali film in 2012.

He helped the Korean pop band Blackswan in the making of their music video Karma released in May 2023. This music video was shot in Bhubaneswar.

=== Filmography (Odia) ===
Year	Title	Roles
2023	Niyati	Tiger
2022	Herogiri	
2022	Trusna	
2021	Durgatinasini	
2021	Kurukshetra	
2020	Babu Bhaijan	
2020	Adrushyam	
2020	Tike love Tike Twist	
2017	Naamard	
2017	Love u Jessica	
2016	Sweetheart	Double Role (Abdul Rehman, Salim)
2016	Hello	
2015	Kehi Nuhen Kahara	Rahul Chaudary
2015	Ishq Tu Hi Tu	Ahmed
2014	Krantidhara	Abhay
2014	Haribol Nuhe Tanka Bol	Special Appearance
2014	Akhire Akhire	Kala
2013	Hari Om Hari	Ali Khan
2013	Nai Separi Kanaka Gori	Ranga
2013	Mu Aashiq Mu Awara	S. P. Samar Patnaik
2012	Love Master	Veer Bajrangi
2012	Luchakali	Kalidas Patnaik
2012	Thukul	
2011	Aain Kanoon	
2011	Mane Rahiba E Prema Kahani	Jackie
2011	Katak	Hussein
2011	Criminal	
2011	Chocolate	Doctor
2011	143 I Love You	MLA Mitu Mohanty
2011	Most Wanted	Mustaq Ali
2011	E Mana Khoje Mana Tie	Som
2011	Loafer	Ronny Rana
2010	Diwana	Anup Patanaik
2010	Prema Adhei Akhyara	Dina
2010	Bhul Bujhibani Mate	Raj
2010	Sanju Aau Sanjana	Sameer
2009	Mukhyamantari	Sidhart Patnaik
2007	Dhauli Express	Dhauli Das
2007	Mo Suna Pua	Binay

=== Filmography (Hindi) ===
- 23rd March 1931: Shaheed (2002)

=== Television ===
Show	Role	Channel	Year
Sanskaar	Rahul chowdhary	Etv Odia	2006-2007
Uttardai	Udit	Odisha TV	2006-2008
Devi	Ranjit	Tarang TV	2010-2011
Basundhara	Sameer	DD Odia	2008-2009
Khara Bharsa ra Khela	Abijeet	DD Odia	2008-2009
Mu Cinema	Host	Tarang TV	2013
True Story	Host	MBC TV	2011
Satya Aprad	Host	Odisha TV	2014
Ete Bhala Paye Tate		Tarang Plus	2021

=== Acting Theater ===
Routray's theatre journey comprised some plays such as the following.

Playname	Director
Shakuntala ki anguthi	Ram Gopal Bajaj
Ekach pyala	Amal Allana
Sheela Shringar	Robin Das
Macbeth	John Rosel Brown
Othello	M. K. Raina
Swapna Katha	K.N Panikkar

== Awards ==
2017

- 28th Odisha State Film Awards - Best Actor In NAMARD Movie.

2016

- 7th Tarang Cine Awards - Best Actor In Negative Role "Ishq Tu Hi Tu" Movie.
- Odisha State Film Awards - Best Actor in supporting Role "Ishq Tu Hi Tu" Movie.

2011 - 2012

- 3rd Tarang Cine Awards - Best Actor in A Negative Role "Loafer" Movie
- Instant News Entertainment- for Most Wanted Movie
- 6th Showtime Award - for Most Wanted
- LALCHAND ENTERTAINMENT AWARD- Favourite Actor in Negative Role
- CHALACHITRA JAGAT- for Best actor in Negative role Most Wanted Movie.

2009 - 2010

- 4th Showtime Oriya Film & TV awards - Best Actor in a Negative role for Sanskaar.
- 2nd Vysya Oriya Film & TV awards - Best Actor in a Negative role for Sanskaar.
- Gurukul Awards – Best Actor in a Negative role for Sanskaar.

2008 - 2009

- Amit Awards - Best Actor in a Negative role for Sanskar.
- AB Visual TV Awards - Best Actor in a Supporting Role for Uttardai.

2007 - 2008

- Banichitra Award - Special Award for contribution to Oriya television & film Industry
