= Kabisuryanagar =

- Town
- Nickname: K.S.N
- Location in Odisha, India Kabisuryanagar (India)
- Coordinates: 19.5977°N 84.7549°E
- Country: India
- State: Odisha
- District: Ganjam
- Named for: Kabisurya Baladeba Ratha

Government
  - Type: Municipality
  - Body: Kabisuryanagar Municipal Council

Population (2011)
  - Total: 17,430

Languages
  - Official: Odia
- Time zone: UTC+5:30 (IST)
- PIN: 761104
- Telephone code: 06822
- Vehicle registration: OR-07; OD-07
- Website: odisha.gov.in

Kabisuryanagar (also spelled Kavisuryanagar) is a town and a Municipality in Ganjam district in the Indian state of Odisha.

== History & Culture ==
Kabisuryanagar is named after the writer Kabisurjya Baladeba Ratha. Kabisuryanagar is also known by its former name of Boirani; it was an important town of the Athgarh princely state. Kabisuryanagar has been a hub of Odissi music for several centuries, due to the presence of Kabisurjya Baladeba Ratha who set up an institution to impart training in Odissi music in the region. In the early 20th-century, Acharya Tarini Charan Patra set up his institution in Kabisuryanagar, called Gandhiji Sangeeta Kalamandira with the support of the Maharaja of Khallikote. Among well-known students of Tarini Patra hailing from the same town are Durjyodhan Sahu and Ramarao Patra.

== Demographics ==
As of 2001 India census, Kabisuryanagar had a population of 16,092. Males constitute 41% of the population and females 59%. Kabisuryanagar has an average literacy rate of 62%, higher than the national average of 59.5%: male literacy is 72%, and female literacy is 53%. In Kabisuryanagar, 13% of the population is under 6 years of age.

Religion in Kabisurjyanagar
| Hinduism | 99.33% |
| Islam | 0.46% |
| Christianity | 0.09% |
| Sikh | 0.00% |
| Buddhist | 0.00% |
| Jain | 0.00% |
| Not Stated | 0.11% |
| Other | 0.00% |

== Climate and regional setting ==
Maximum summer temperature is 37 °C; minimum winter temperature is 16 °C. The mean daily temperature varies from 33 °C to 38 °C. May is the hottest month; December is the coldest. The average annual rainfall is 1250 mm and the region receives monsoon and torrential rainfall from July to October.

Climate data for Kabisuryanagar, Odisha
| Month | Jan | Feb | Mar | Apr | May | Jun | Jul | Aug | Sep | Oct | Nov | Dec | Year |
|---|---|---|---|---|---|---|---|---|---|---|---|---|---|
| Mean daily maximum °C (°F) | 27 (81) | 30 (86) | 34 (93) | 36 (97) | 37 (99) | 34 (93) | 32 (90) | 31 (88) | 32 (90) | 32 (90) | 30 (86) | 28 (82) | 32 (90) |
| Mean daily minimum °C (°F) | 16 (61) | 19 (66) | 23 (73) | 27 (81) | 29 (84) | 28 (82) | 27 (81) | 27 (81) | 26 (79) | 23 (73) | 20 (68) | 16 (61) | 23 (74) |
| Average rainfall mm (inches) | 12.40 (0.49) | 17.40 (0.69) | 18.60 (0.73) | 15.00 (0.59) | 40.30 (1.59) | 150.00 (5.91) | 282.10 (11.11) | 272.80 (10.74) | 180.00 (7.09) | 93.00 (3.66) | 33.00 (1.30) | 18.60 (0.73) | 1,133.2 (44.63) |
Source: MSM Weather

== Politics ==
The current MLA from Kavisuryanagar Assembly Constituency is Mrs. Latika Pradhan of BJD, who won the seat in State elections of 2019. Previous MLAs from this seat were V.Sugyan Kumar Deo from BJD who won this seat in 2009 & 2014. Mr. Nityananda Pradhan of CPI who won this seat in 2000 and in 1990, Harihar Swain of INC in 1995, Radha Govinda Sahu who won representing INC in 1985 and as a candidate of INC(I) in 1980, and Tarini Patnaik of JNP in 1977.

Kavisuryanagar is part of Aska (Lok Sabha constituency).
