= Balwantrai Bhatt =

Balwant Rai Bhatt
- Born: 23 September 1921
- Origin: Bhavnagar, Gujarat, India
- Died: 2 May 2016 (aged 94)
- Genres: Hindustani Classical Music
- Occupations: Composer, Singer

Pandit Balwant Rai Bhatt (23 September 1921 – 2 May 2016) was a noted Indian composer and musician of Hindustani Vocal Music. He was also known as Bhavrang (भावरंग). He died at his home in Varanasi on 2 May 2016.

== Early life and background ==
Balwant Rai Bhatt was born in Bhavnagar, Gujarat to Smt. Harkunvar and Shri Gulabrai Bhatt on 23 September 1921.

== Career ==
Bhatt was a disciple of Pandit Omkarnath Thakur of Gwalior Gharana. In 1950, he moved to Varanasi with his mentor setting up a music institution named Kala Sangeet Bharati at the Banaras Hindu University. He taught at the university for 31 years. The music institution grew and evolved through the years, and was the Faculty of Performing Arts.

Apart from being an educator, he was known as an exceptionally talented composer. He was considered a complete Vaggeyakaar, one who composes both Vak or the word (couplets, poems) and the Geya (literally translated to singable) or the melody. He has a penchant for layakari, and many of his compositions incorporate intricate laya (tempo) patterns. Many of his compositions have been published in book form as the three volumes of Bhavrang Lahari. Bhavrang was his pen name. He was 'Gurubandhu' Classmate of Pt.Jashvantrai Bhatt(Disciple of Omkarnathji).

== Books ==
He edited the Sangeetanjali series of books that were authored by Pandit Omkarnath Thakur. A 3-volume book series called Bhavrang Lahari (भावरंग लहरी) contains many of his compositions.

== Awards ==
Balwant Rai Bhatt has been awarded Padma Shri by the Government of India in 1990. He was awarded Sangeet Natak Akademi Award in 2004. He was honored with the prestigious Kalidas Samman in the year 2007–08.

== Students ==
- Damodar Hota
- Veena Sahasrabuddhe
- Prof. Chittaranjan Jyotishi
