= Tarini Charan Patra =

Astabadhani Acharya Tarini Charan Patra ତାରିଣୀ ଚରଣ ପାତ୍ର
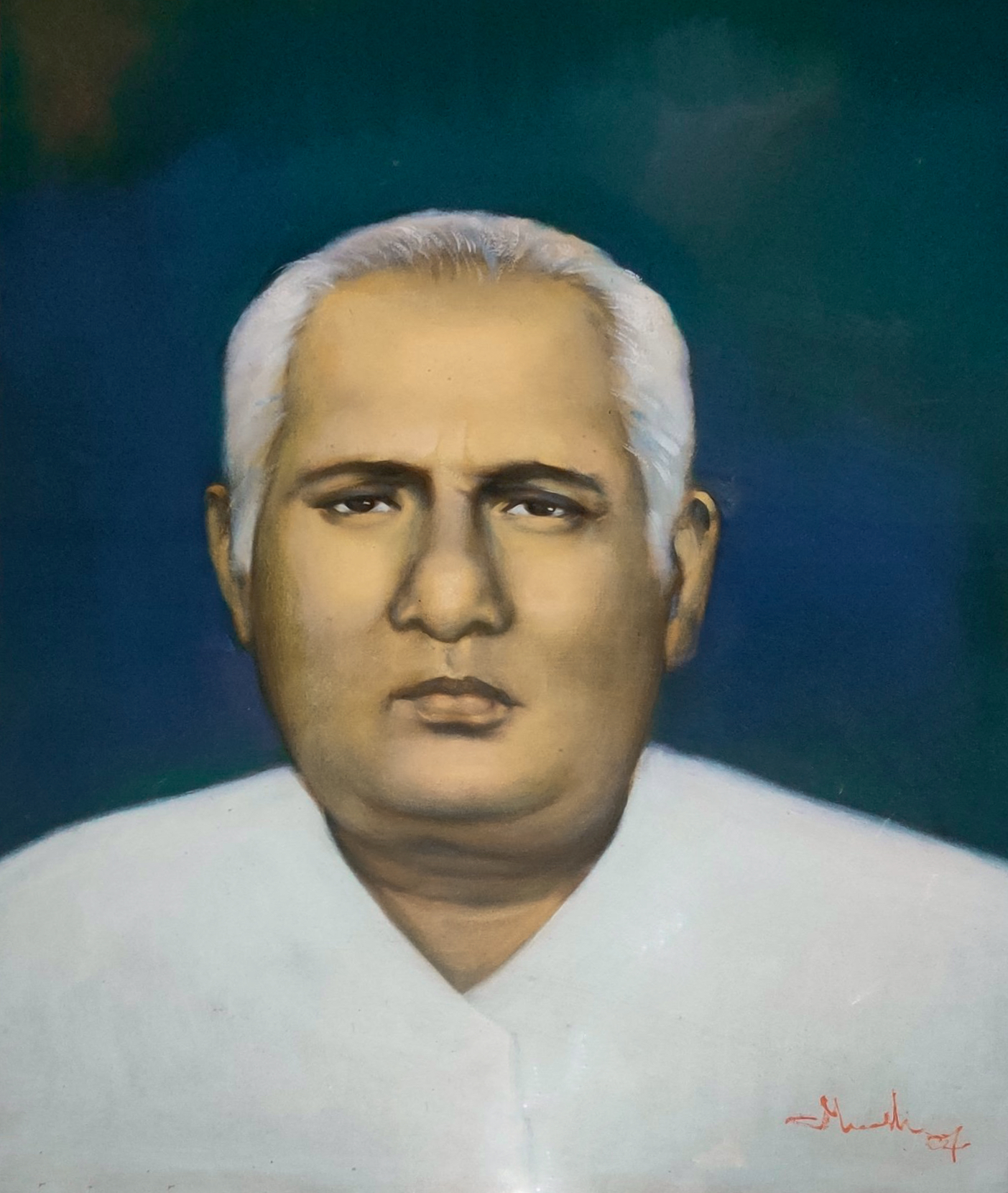

Background information
- Born: Tarini Charan Patra; 1 February 1893; Pittala, Ganjam, Odisha
- Died: 4 March 1979 (aged 78) Kabisuryanagar, Ganjam, Odisha
- Genre: Odissi music
- Occupations: Odissi music Guru, singer, Binākara (Bina artiste), musicologist, composer
- Instrument: Odissi Bina
- Years active: Gandhiji Sangita Kalamandira (1940-1979)
- Spouse: Annapurna Devi

Acharya Tarini Charan Patra (Odia: ତାରିଣୀ ଚରଣ ପାତ୍ର, romanized: Tāriṇi Charaṇa Pātra, Odia: [t̪aːriɳi t͡ʃɔɾɔɳɔ paːt̪ɾɔ]; 1893 – 4 March 1979) was a renowned Odissi musician, Guru, singer, scholar, poet, composer & Bīṇākara (exponent of Odissi Bina). One of the most eminent artistes of Odissi classical music in the 20th century, he was known for his vocal renditions & Bina recitals on gramophone records & over the All India Radio, as well as his pioneering efforts in institutionalizing the training of Odissi music by setting up one of the earliest music universities in erstwhile Odisha, the Gandhiji Sangita Kalamandira at Boirani, Ganjam that remained active from 1940 until Patra's demise in 1979.

He began his musical training first from his elder brother, who taught him Odissi, Chhanda, Champu and the various facets of Odissi music. He then continued higher training (in vocal and Bina) under Guru Gaurahari Mahapatra of Pailipada, Bhanjanagar. Drawn towards Vaishnava practices, Patra developed a dispassionate attitude (vairagya) towards worldly affairs and started a Sankirtana group called 'Bhaja Gobinda'. Soon his fame as a singer spread across Ganjam, with multiple students learning from him and branches of Bhaja Gobinda being established in various places. Several miraculous incidents record Patra's spiritual attainments, including an incident where Mahaprabhu Jagannatha informed his head priest in a dream that he had "gone away to Boirani to listen to Patra's Kirtana". Patra burst out into a song at the head priest's arrival - "ଆଉ କି ଦେଖିବ ନୟନ ମୋ ବାଇମନ, ବୋଇରାଣୀ ଗ୍ରାମ ବଇକୁଣ୍ଠ ଧାମ ହରିନାମେ ପରିପୂର୍ଣ୍ଣ". Events such as these spread Patra's fame across the state. For his mastery over eight disciplines (vocal music, Bina, Mardala, musicology, sahitya-explanation, poetry-music composition and others) he was awarded the title of Astabadhani by the Khallikote rajasabhā after almost a month of rigorous tests, conditions of which included minimal sleep and continuous demanding performances. The title made him famous across Ganjam, and several kings such as the king of Dharakote invited him to their courts, where Patra learned under the veteran court musicians, such as Gayakaratna Binayak Panda of Dharakote, Gayaka Siromani Apanna Panigrahi of Paralakhemundi, Rajaguru Basudeba Mahapatra of Chikiti and Tripati Gayakaratna of Badakhemundi among others. Patra also learned from Guru Mohana Panda of Paralakhemundi, Guru Hadu Patra of Boirani.

In 1940, he established an institution called Sangita Kalamandira at his hometown Boirani (now Kabisuryanagar) for imparting systematic education in Odissi music. At the time, it was the first musical institute in all of South Odisha. Patra received encouragement from Ramachandra Mardaraja, the king of Khallikote and Sadashiva Tripathy, later Chief Minister of Odisha. Traditionally, Odissi music was taught in the ancient gurukula system or at temples, mathas, jagas & akhadas. The concept of a formal institution only for musical education was quite new for the region. The institute was later renamed to Gandhiji Sangita Kalamandira in honour of Mahatma Gandhi. Among his disciples (alumni of Kalamandira) are renowned vocalist Guru Durjyodhana Sahoo and Odissi Bina exponent Guru Ramarao Patra.

Patra is the author of several books on Odissi music, the best-known of them being Odisi Sangita Prakasa (1970) which propounded the theory of 32 melas for scientific classification. In the first half of the 20th century, Patra began systematic efforts to collect original compositions of the ancient poet-composers such as Kabisurjya and Gopalakrusna from their authentic sisya paramparā (disciples), among the last-living masters of the 19th century. Patra laid great emphasis on singing the songs exactly as the composers had taught them, trying to document them in as much detail as he could, in the process collecting and teaching antique forms of ragas along with ancient compositions dating back to as early as the 16th century and archaic methods of binyāsa or elaboration based on six angas of the prabandha, known as sadanga ālāpa. His research was mostly in the kingdoms of South Odisha, undivided Ganjam : Paralakhemundi, Ghumusara, Dharakote, Athagada, Khallikote, Chikiti, Surangi, Badakhemundi (Digapahandi), Sanakhemundi, Jalantara, Manjusa, Tekkali (Tikili), Tarala, Jeypore (Jayapura); covering parts of present-day Ganjam, Gajapati, Koraput, Rayagada, Malkangiri, Nabarangpur, Kandhamal, Nayagarh districts.

For his efforts, he received the Odisha Sangeet Natak Akademi award in 1972.

== See also ==
- Odissi music
- Mardala
- Gita Govinda
- Gitaprakasa
