= Damodar Hota =

Indian classical musician (1935–2022)

Padmakesari Damodar Hota ଦାମୋଦର ହୋତା
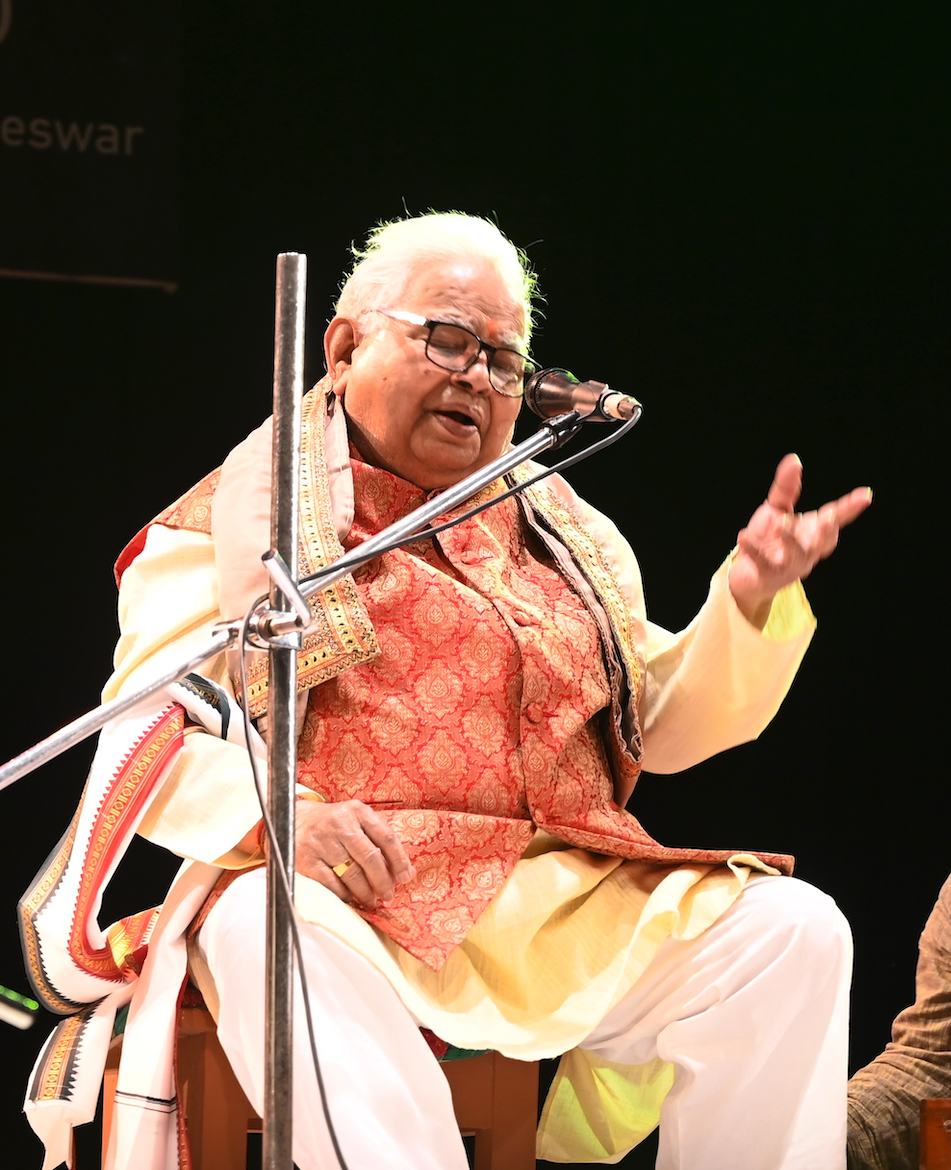

Background information
- Born: 25 December 1935; Puri, Odisha, British Raj
- Origin: Puri, Odisha, India
- Died: 5 February 2022 (aged 86) Bhubaneswar, Odisha, India
- Genres: Hindustani classical music, Odissi classical music (Udra Paddhatiya Sangita)
- Occupations: Classical vocalist; scholar; composer; educator

Pandit Damodar Hota (Odia: ଦାମୋଦର ହୋତା, romanized: Dāmodara Hotā; 25 December 1935 – 5 February 2022) was an Indian classical vocalist, musicologist, composer, and guru based in Odisha, India. He was an exponent of Hindustani classical music as well as Odissi classical music (Udra Paddhatiya Sangita).

His primary research on Odissi classical music in the 1960s was groundbreaking in uncovering the historical roots, distinct ragas, talas, and lakshyanas of the music.

== Career ==
A Top Grade artist of Doordarshan and All India Radio, he started learning music from his mother Smt. Dandimani Devi and father Sri Gopinath Hota who was skilled in Odissi music and Mardala. He also learned from the elderly musicians of the Jaga-Akhadas of Puri and the Jagannath Temple. He continued higher training in Odissi music under Guru Nrusingha Nath Khuntia.

He was a chief disciple of Padmashree Pt. Balwant Rai Bhatt (Bhav Rang) and Pandit Pt. Omkarnath Thakur (Pranav Rang). His compositions bear the pen name 'Swar Rang'.

He attended the College of Music and Fine Arts at Banaras Hindu University. For his Doctor of Music (Sangeet Pravin) degree, he was awarded the Pandit Mirashi Buwa Puraskar. He held Madhyama Purna in Tabla and Visharad in Pakhawaj.

He served as principal and senior faculty of Hindustani vocal music at Utkal Sangeet Mahavidyalaya.

== Teaching ==
Pandit Hota had been teaching music in the gurukula tradition since 1963. He was the founder and chief guru of Swar Rang, an institution of Hindustani Classical and Udra Paddhatiya Sangita. To aid teaching and preservation, he authored numerous books notating and discussing the practice, compositions, theory, and historical aspects of both forms of music. Many of the books are used as syllabus work across Odisha. From 2007 to 2016, Pandit Hota organized the annual Tridhara National Music Conference to spread knowledge of Udra Paddhatiya Sangita alongside the two other forms of Indian Classical Music. Pandit Hota established the Sri Jagannath Institute of Udra Padhhatiya Sangeet for research and training in Udra Paddhatiya Sangita (Odissi music).

== Death ==
He died in Bhubaneswar on 5 February 2022, at the age of 86.

== Published works ==
- Kisora Chandrananda Champu Lahari
- Udra Paddhatiya Mela Raga Tala Lakhyana (in 7 parts)
- Hindustani Sangeeta Lahari (in 5 parts)
- Lakhyana O Swara Malika Lahari (part 1)
- Srimandira Sangeeta Mala (in 2 parts)
- Sangeet Shashtra (part 1)
- Bharatiya Sangeeta Ra Itihasa (in 2 parts)
- Udra Paddhatiya Mela Raga Tala O Prabandha Lakhyana (part 1)
