= Mahuri (instrument) =

Traditional musical instrument

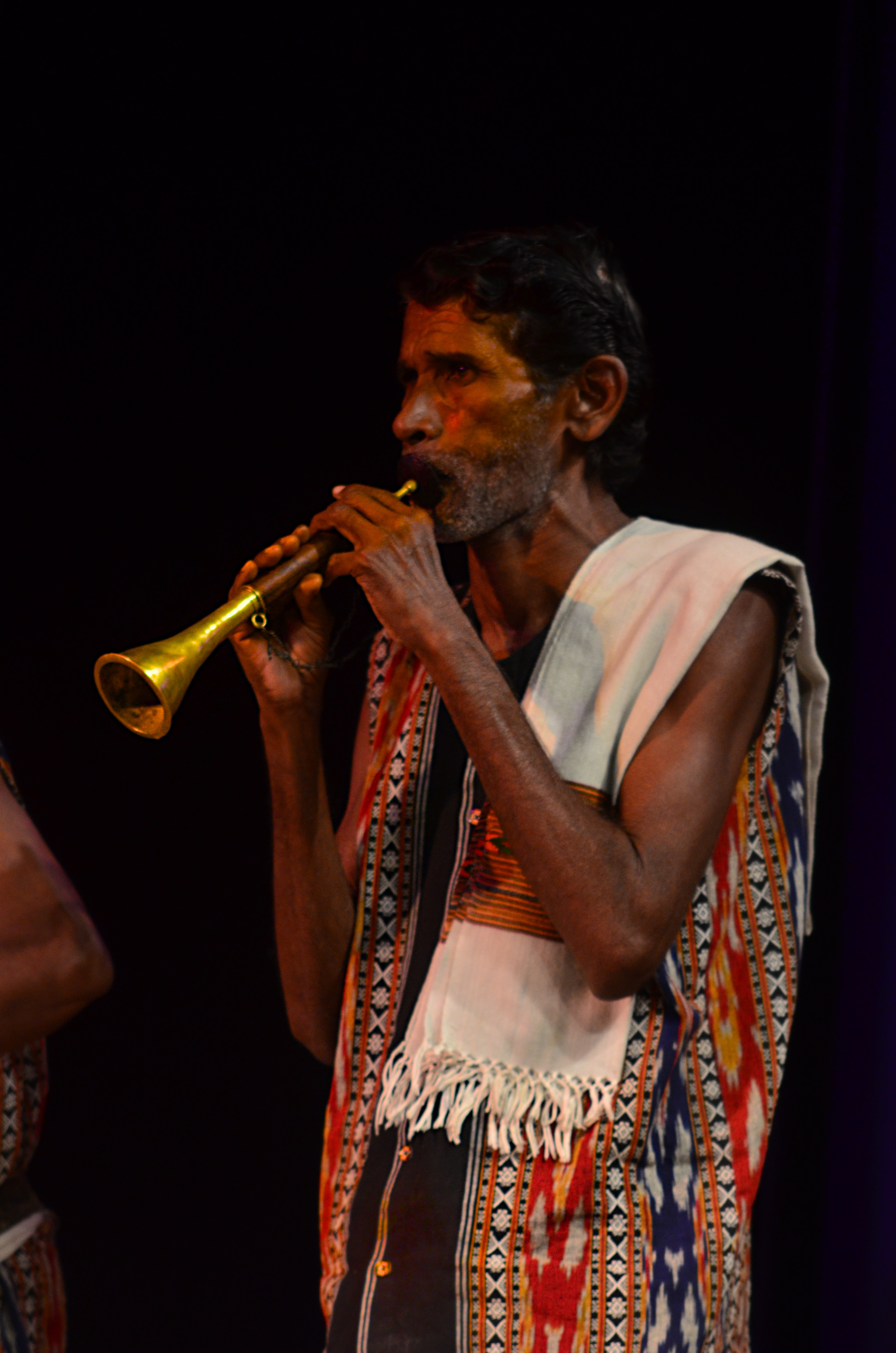
- A Mahuria (musician) plays the Mahuri in a Panchabadya ensemble, a traditional folk performance in Odisha
- Other names: Mohuri, Jodi Mahuri
- Classification: Wind instrument
- Hornbostel–Sachs classification: 421.122 (Aerophone, single-reed)
- Timbre: Melodious
- Volume: Medium
- Attack: Quick
- Decay: Sustained

Playing range
- Variable Variable

Musicians
- Mahurias

The Mahuri is a wind instrument made of wood and metal and it holds a special place in the cultural traditions of Odisha and Chhattisgarh. It is used in religious ceremonies, weddings, bratopanayan, social events and auspicious occasions. It is also referred to as "Mohuri". The Mahuri is an accompaniment in traditional Dalkha performances. Mahuri is also a part of 'Gandabaja', a folk art form from western Odisha.

The Mahuri is played by local artists at a wedding in Nabarangpur. Along with the Mahuri, the Tamak (Tamak) and Gochhibaja are also played.

Musicians who play the Mahuri or Jodi Mahuri are known as Mahuria. Mahurias perform at various events, including temple ceremonies and weddings, with increased demand during the Durga Puja season. They typically charge around ₹1,000 for their performances and often play in groups of three to five. These folk musicians receive support from the Government of Odisha through the Mukhyamantri Kalakar Sahayata Yojana, which provides pensions of ₹2,000 per month for general beneficiaries and ₹2,500 for those aged over 80.

It was reported in 2012 by The New Indian Express that the Mohuri is at risk of extinction due to insufficient government support and declining demand and many Mahuri players are abandoning the profession in favor of alternative livelihoods.

The annual Bodasambar Mahuri Festival is organized by the Sangeet Samiti in Padmapur, Odisha, to preserve the traditional Mahuri instrument.

== Gallery ==
Mahuri

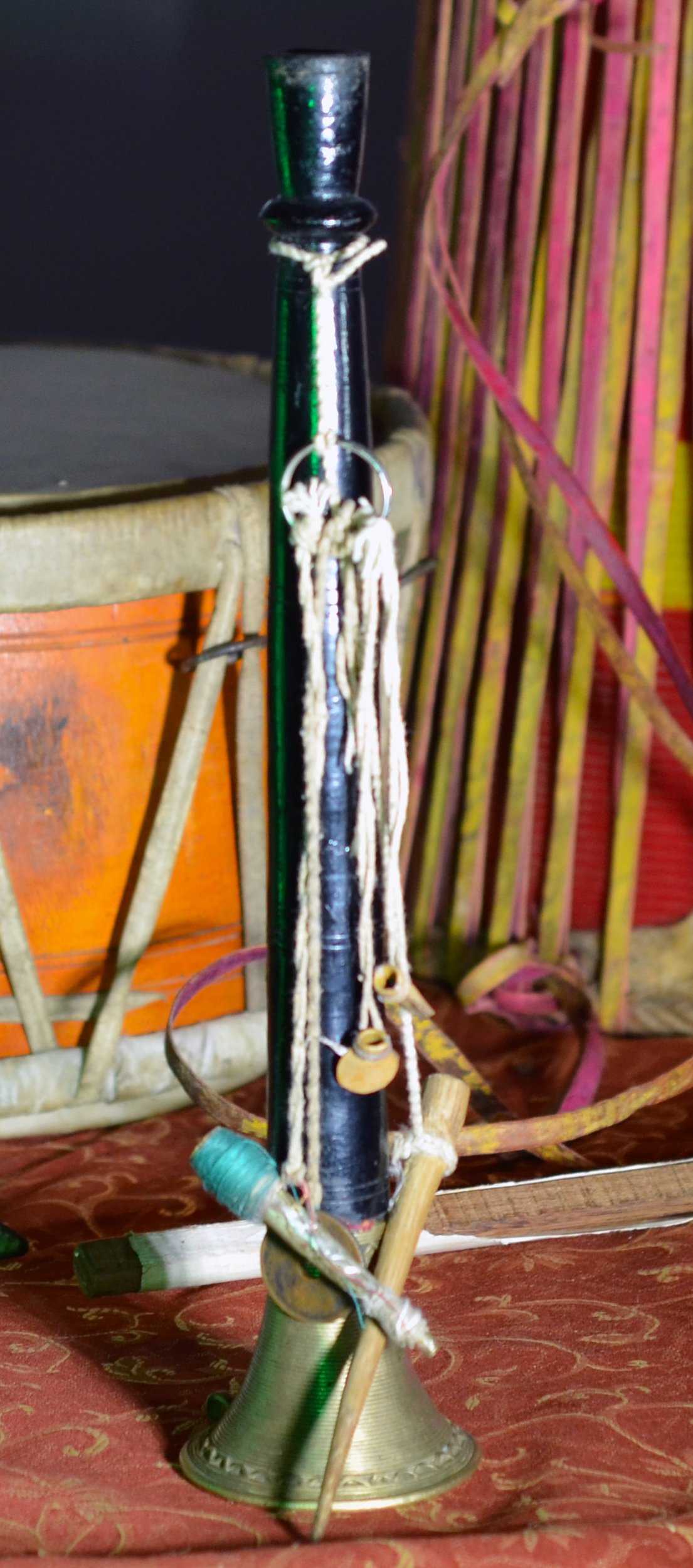

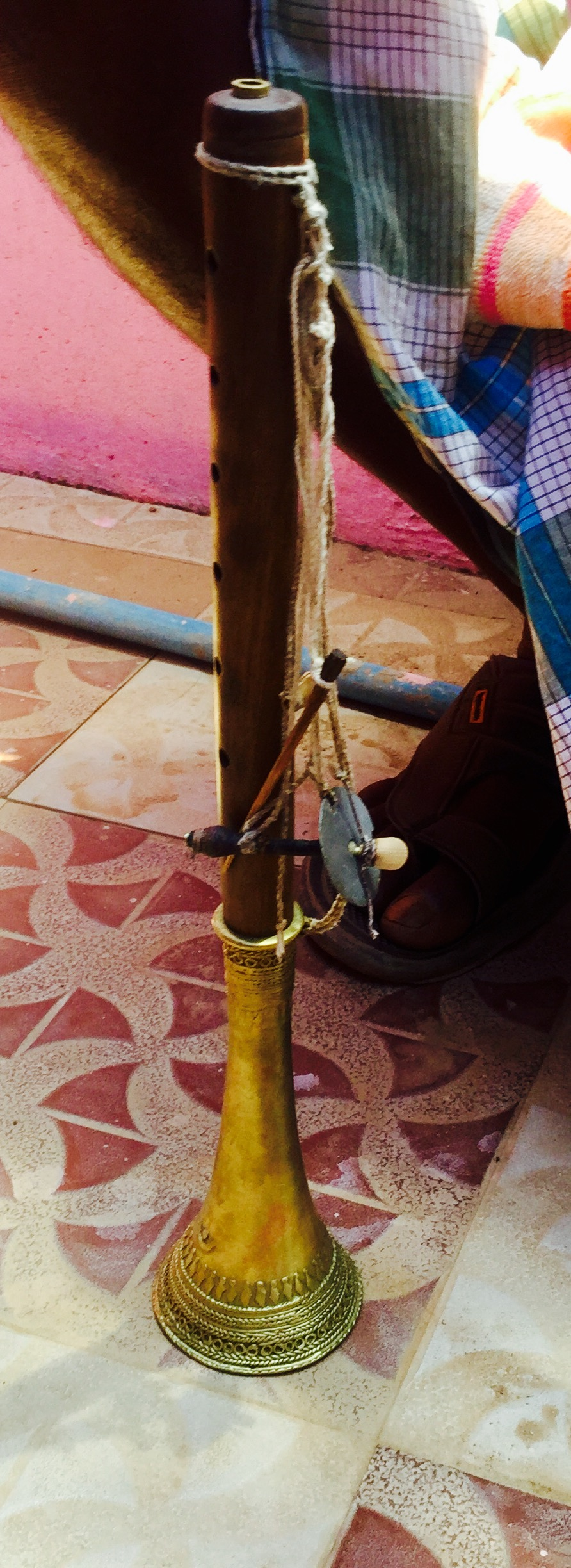

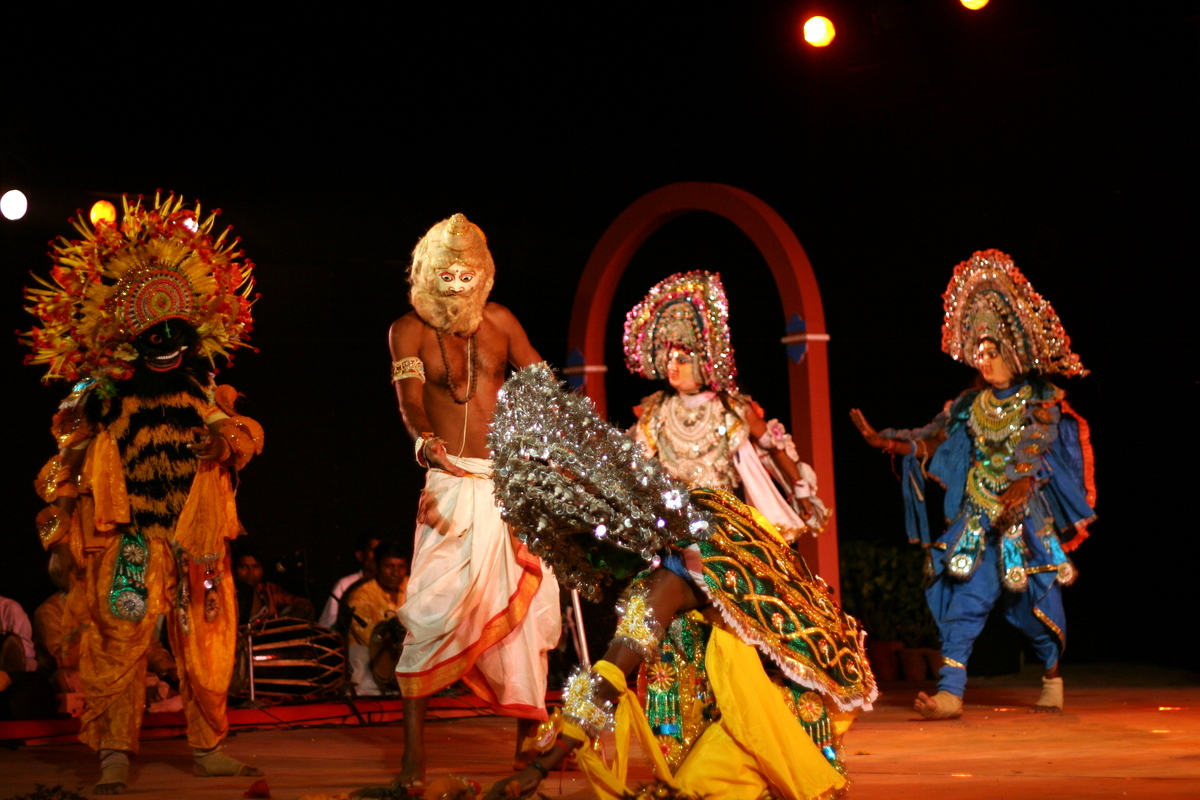
The Mahuri is also played during folk theatre performances like Rama Nataka and dances such as Chhau.

== See also ==
- Music of Odisha
- Bamboo musical instruments
- Bansuri
