= Ramhari Das =

Odissi Singer and Guru

Professor Ramhari Das ରାମହରି ଦାସ
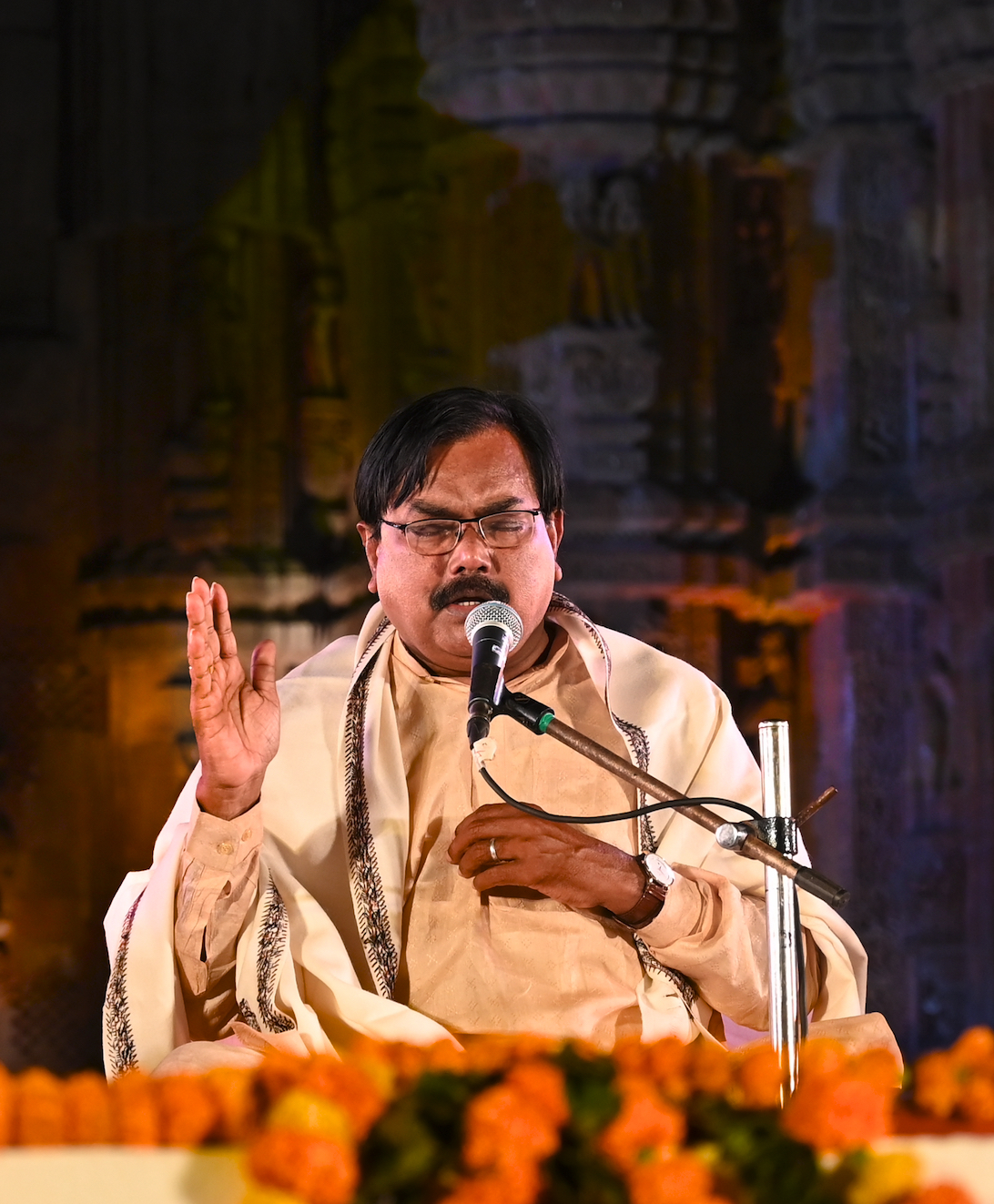
- Guru Ramhari Das performing at Rajarani Music Festival 2021

Background information
- Born: Ramhari Das; 1 February 1953; Kanpur, Balasore, Odisha
- Genre: Odissi music
- Occupations: Odissi music Guru, singer, professor, scholar, musicologist, composer
- Awards: Sangeet Natak Akademi Award 2008

Pandit Ramhari Das (Odia: ରାମହରି ଦାସ, romanized: Rāmahari Dāsa, Odia: [raːmɔhɔri d̪aːsɔ]; born 1953) is a leading singer, composer, musicologist and Guru of Odissi music. Known for his renditions, compositions, lecture-demonstrations and writings, Das has served as a professor and led the Odissi vocal department in prominent musical institutions of Odisha, including the Utkal Sangeet Mahavidyalaya and the Utkal University of Culture. He is the founder of Ramhari Das Odissi Gurukula at Biragobindapur, Puri. For his contributions to Odissi music, Das received the Sangeet Natak Akademi award in 2008.

== Life ==
Born in 1953 in Balasore, Das started his initial training in Odissi music from his uncle Radhakrushna Das and Guru Prafulla Kumar Sur. He continued under Gurus including Markandeya Mahapatra, Balakrushna Das, Bhikari Charan Bal and Gopal Chandra Panda as a student in the Utkal Sangeet Mahavidyalaya. He later served as a lecturer in the same institution and then as the head of the Odissi music department from 1985 to 2010. He is a leading singer and composer of Odissi music. Besides solo recitals and vocal accompaniment in dance, he has won acclaim for composing a large number of songs for Odissi dance and dance-dramas. Outside of these, he has sung for Odia films and television serials.

Among his published writings are the books Odissi Sangitara Parampara O Prayoga, Sangita Sangya, Alankara Ratnabali and Kala Sikhya (published by the Board of Secondary Education, Odisha). Das has several research papers & articles to his credit and has presented in various seminars & conferences across the nation. He has also received a Senior Research Fellowship from the Government of India for his research on Odissi music. He has been connected in various capacities with cultural institutions in Odisha, including the Odisha Sangeet Natak Akademi, the Utkal University of Culture, where he served as the head of the Odissi vocal department and the Guru Kelucharan Mohapatra Odissi Research Centre, where he served as the chief executive. He is one of the chief architects of Sangita Sudhakara Balakrushna Dash foundation that organises an annual three-day festival of Odissi music.

Guru Ramhari Das' Odissi Sangita Pathasala is a series of graded lessons on Odissi music available for free on YouTube, in which Das himself teaches the history of Odissi music, core musical concepts, shastras (treatises) with an individual treatment of ragas and songs.

== Institution ==
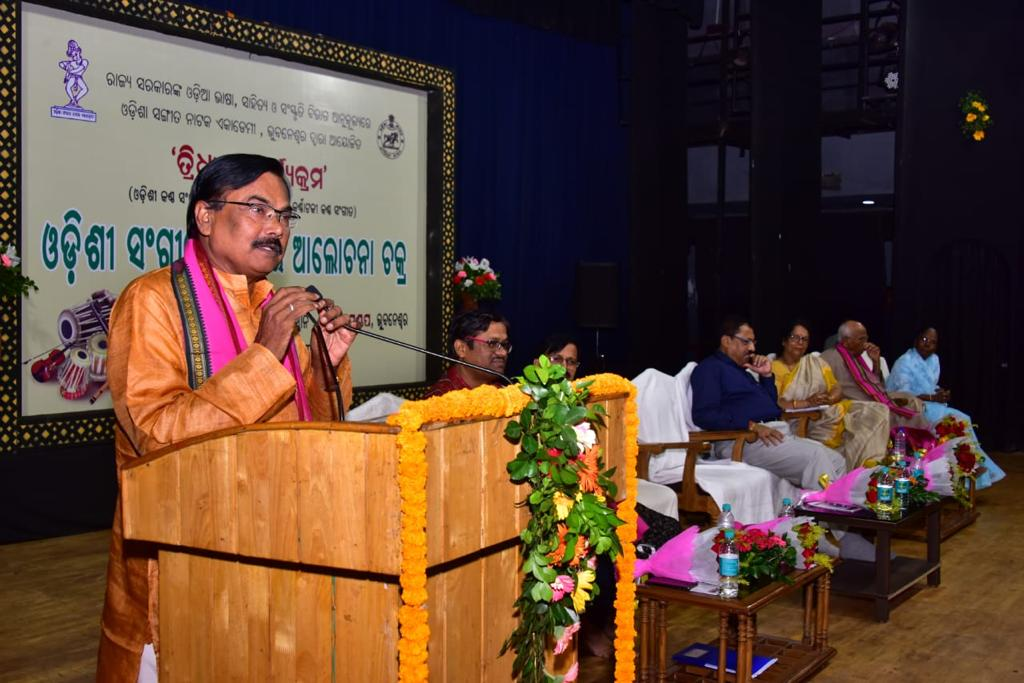
Das presenting a paper in a conference organised by Odisha Sangeet Natak Akademi

Das is acclaimed for his efforts to develop musical awareness and education in Odisha. He has conducted Odissi music recitals in several educational institutions through SPIC MACAY.

He has established the Ramhari Das Odissi Gurukula in the village of Biragobindapura in the Puri district. The Gurukula is a training-cum-research institute that imparts education in Odissi music & dance and organises workshops & seminars. Students are trained in Odissi classical vocal, Odissi Mardala and Odissi Bina (Veena) by Guru Ramhari Das, Guru Dhaneswar Swain & Guru Ramarao Patra respectively. It is the only institution in the state that imparts training in Odissi Bina (Veena). An annual festival called Gurukula Utsav is conducted to showcase diverse facets of Odissi music through curated performances.

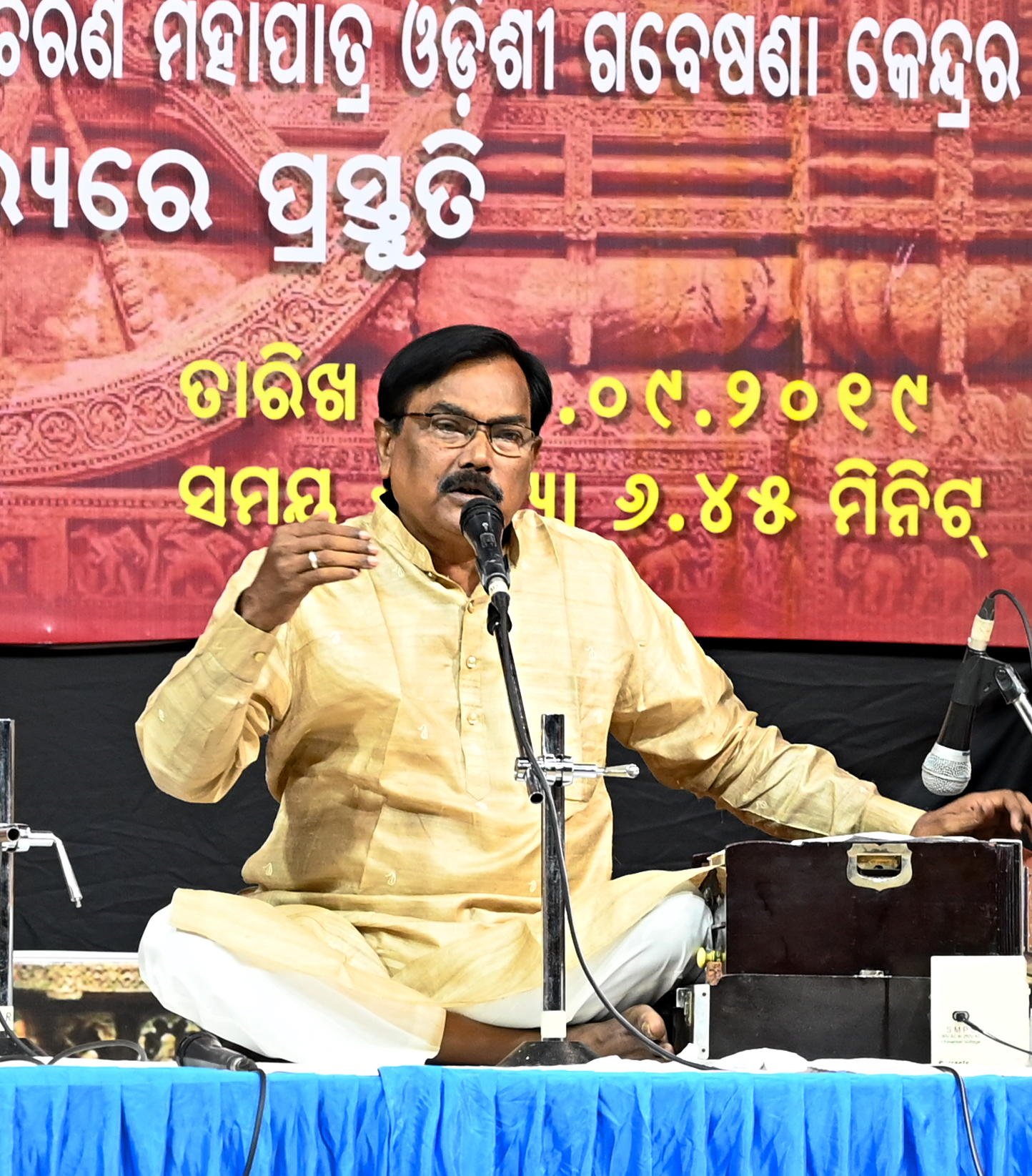
Ramhari Das giving a lecture-demonstration on Odissi music

== Awards and honours ==
Das has received various titles and awards including the central and Odisha Sangeet Natak Akademi awards.

- Sangeet Natak Akademi Award (2008)
- Odisha Sangeet Natak Akademi Award (2008)
- Orissa Dance Academy, Bhubaneswar
- Utkal Sahitya Kala Parishad, Cuttack
- Bharatiya Vidya Bhavan Samman, awarded by the President of India
- Guru Singhari Samman from Guru Gopal Panda Odissi Academy, Bhubaneswar
- Jadumani Das Saraswata Pratibha Samman (2017)
- Guru Sahadev Padhi Memorial Award (2019)

== Published works ==
- Odissi Sangitara Parampara O Prayoga (2004)
- Sangita Sangya (1989‌)
- Alankara Ratnabali (1984)

== See also ==
- Odissi music
- Mardala
- Gita Govinda
- Gitaprakasa
