= Bhikari Bal =

Indian singer (1929–2010)

Bhajana Samrata Bhikari Charan Bal
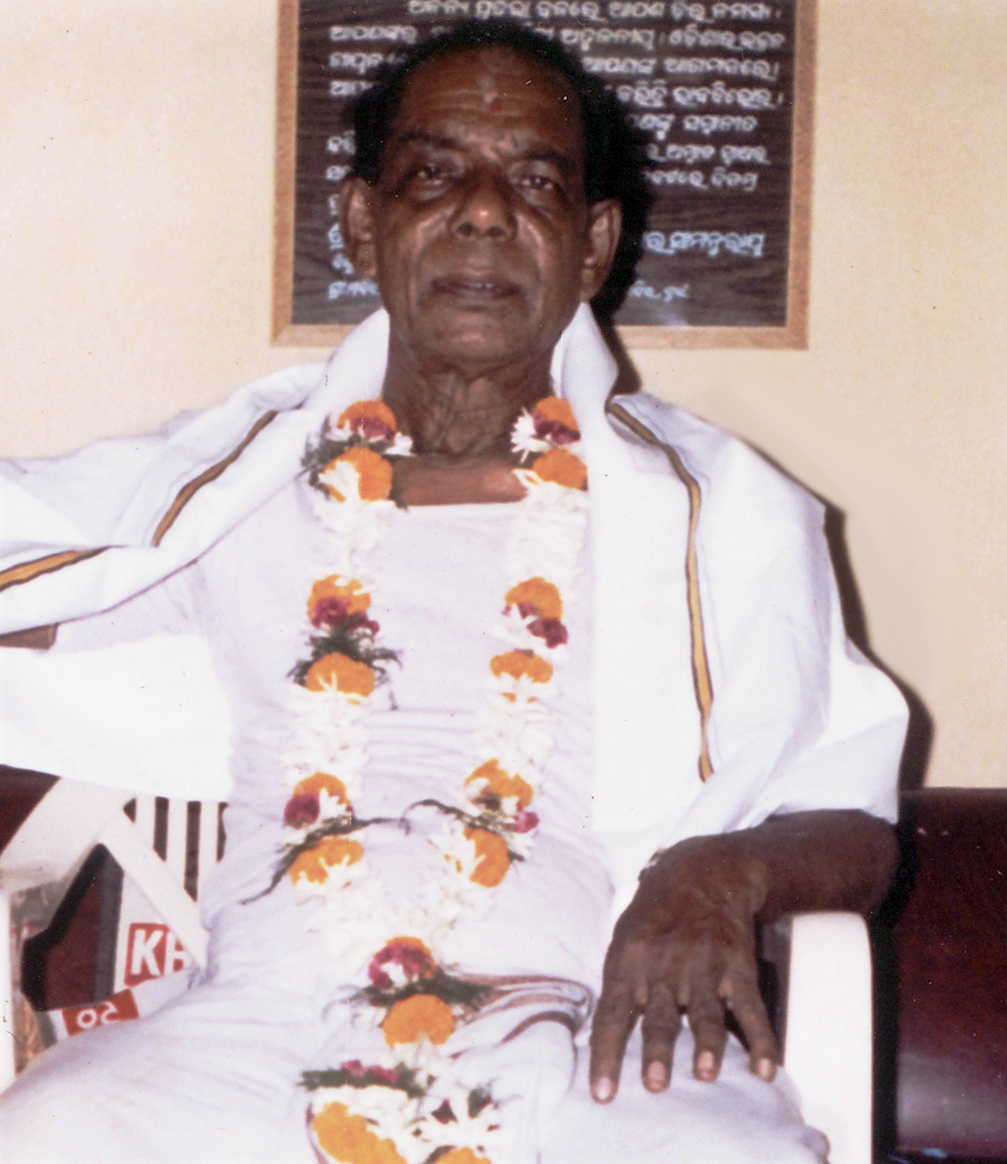

Background information
- Born: 25 May 1929
- Origin: Sobala, Kendrapada, Odisha, India
- Died: 2 November 2010 ( ରମା ଏକାଦଶୀ ) Cuttack
- Genres: Odissi music
- Occupations: Odissi music guru, devotional singer, musician
- Label: Bhikari Bal Foundation
- Website: bhikaribal.com Official YouTube Channel

Pandit Bhikari Charan Bal (Bhikāri Charaṇa Baḷa; 1929-2010), better known as Bhajan Samrat to the people of Odisha, was an Odissi music guru and singer, best known for his renditions of traditional Odia bhajanas, devotional songs addressed to the deity Jagannatha.

== Early life ==
Bhikari Bal was born in Sobala Village Under Gogua, Gangapada Kendrapara block/district in the state of Odisha, India. His parents, Ramachandra Bal and Gellharani Devi, died when he was very young. After the death of his first wife, his father Ramachandra had married Gellharani, Bhikari's mother. Ramachandra's first wife had given birth to a son, Dhaneswara, who was much older than Bhikari. Gellharani gave birth to several children but none of them survived. So they named their surviving only son "Bhikari" - the beggar. Out of superstition, the parents pretended to have sold the baby to a beggar from whom they bought their child back. The child survived but the parents died not long after, so the care of the child Bhikari fell on his step-brother Dhaneswar and his wife.

After primary education, Bhikari enrolled in Gogua High School in Kendrapada district and studied up to ninth grade. His village, Sobala, had a Jatra party and young Bhikari joined it. Through the Jatra party, he learned to sing and act and play harmonium. In those days, boys used to dance as girls in Jatra parties. They were called Gotipua. Later, Bhikari Bal became a music teacher in a local school, Gokulachandra Sangeeta Sadan. He married at the age of 20. For a young man with any talent in any village, Cuttack town was a natural attraction, so he went there to find greener pasture.

== Career ==
Bhikari Bala took the job of an Odissi vocalist at the Kalabikash Kendra, Cuttack. In early 1960s, Bhikari Bal was a struggling artist. Because of his connection to the Kalabikash Kendra, he came to the attention of Kalicharan Pattanayak, the patron saint of anything Odissi and also a well established singer Balakrushna Das. His voice was refined under the tutelage of Odissi maestro Balakrushna Das. This was the period of struggle for him with the late singer constantly trying for a break in All India Radio, Cuttack. He became an A-grade singer there in 1963 after he received rave reviews for his first broadcast song Prana mitani bareh chahan re. But his popularity grew with Kotha bhoga khia, Sathie pauthi bhogaru tumara and other such devotional songs in the early 1970s. His lucid and moving rendition of bhajans written by old generation poets such as Gopalakrushna, Dinakrushna, Baldev, Banamali and Salabega are still popular today. He had also rendered songs by Dr. Prasanna Samal, Arabinda Muduli, Radhanath Das, Raghunath Rout, Khirod Chandra Pothal, Sirsananda Kanungo, Alekh Biswal, Gourhari Dalei and Srikant Gautam. His Jagannath bhajans and Gita Govinda recitals made him a household name. He had also sung Champu, Chhanda, folk songs and devotional songs in Odia movies. He was awarded the title of Bhajan Samrat by the Puri Gajapati and was given special privileges inside the temple for his devotional tribute to Lord Jagannath. He was also taken to be one of the servitors of the temple for having offered the Chaamara Seba to Lord Jagannath. He also gave his voice as playback singer in a number of Odia films including Bhakta Salabega, Agni Pariksha, Mathura Bijaya, Abhilasha, Amar Prem, Kie Kahara and Srikrushna Rasa Leela, etc..

== Discography ==
The following songs have been sung by Bhiakri Bal, but the year of their release is unknown, since these mainly played over radio between 1970 and 2000. Although the list is comprehensive yet it's not exhaustive.

- Athara Dinara Mahabharata
- Ana Ana Re Mita
- Aakhi Kholi Dekhuthile Disu Asundara
- Aadei Jaao
- Aahe Chakaakhi
- Aahe Nilagiri
- Aahe Nilasaila
- Aahe Prabhu Kala Srimukha
- Bada Thakura He
- Badadeulare Neta Ude Phara Phara
- Baliaa Tu Saakhi Rahitha
- Babu Re Prabhu Nama Kebe Tu Dharibu
- Bhakata Bidura
- Bhakti Achi Mora Puja Nahin
- Bhabaku Nikata Abhaabaku Dura
- Bhuja Tale Mote Rakha
- Chanhi Chanhi Dina Gala
- Daasiaa Nadia
- Daasia Baauri Karide Kaaliaa
- Dinabandhu Ehi Ali Srichhamure
- Dinabandhu Daitaari
- Dukha Nasono He
- De Re Kaaliaa De To Paade Sarana De
- Dekha Re Dekha
- Dayakara Dinabandhu
- Emiti E Badadaande
- Garuda Pakhi
- Hatiaa Thakura
- Haatare Mo Mutha Mutha
- Himalaya Ru Kanyakumari
- Jagabandhu He Gosaayin
- Jagabandhu Pari Jane Saamanta
- Jagannatha He Etiki Karuchi Ali
- Jagannatha Kale Ja Anaatha
- Jagannatha Kichi Maagu Nahin Tote
- Jagannatha Tume Jadi Lakshmi Huanta
- Jaga kalia Re
- Jaga kalia Dakuchi Bhuja Melei
- Jaga kalia Paade Sarana
- Jalu thiba Maha

dipa Baju thiba Sankha

- Jibanare Jibi Brundabana
- Jaya Jaya Jagannatha
- Kalia Ra Dori Bhari Sakata
- Kalia Saante Ho
- Kete Janamara Dukha Pare Prabhu
- Kehi Rahi Nahi Rahibe Nahi
- Kotho Bhoga Khia
- Mahabahu Jaha Tuma ichha Taha Heu
- Mana Para Re
- Mana Harinama Ganthidhana
- Manabodha Chautisha
- Micchha Duniaare Gotie Sata
- Micchhe Sina Mali Daaki Daaki
- Mu Ta Badadeulara Para
- Mora Jedina Jaliba Juui
- Na Galu Mana Khetrasthala Ku
- Nandanandana Sundara Chhitachora
- Nilachakre Ho
- Patitapaabana Baanaa Aau Kete Belaku
- Paani Jaauthila Hali Hali
- Sabhien Kahanti Badadaanda Bada
- Sakhi Lo Thare Pachaari Bujha
- Sate Ki E Jiiba Jiba
- Saante Pheribe Deulaku Aaji
- Shyama He Shyama He
- Sathiye Pauti
- Tume Para Badathakura
- Tote Kemiti Daakibi Kaalia
- Tora Saanta Panaku kie Sariki
- Thaka Mana Chala Jiba

== Final years and death ==
The singer was bed-ridden for about a year due to age related ailments and had been admitted to the SCB Medical College and Hospital in Cuttack. After the public outrage, the Govt. of Odisha offered financial assistance to the legend and urged the state health department to take care of his health. On 2 November 2010, he died at the SCB Medical College and Hospital at around 11:20 pm. Later, he was consigned to flames at the Swargadwara at Puri. His elder son Ashok Bal performed the last rites. A guard of honour by according gun salute was presented at the crematorium while the Sri Jagannath Temple administration presented a sacred piece of cloth (khandua) to cover his body.
