= Gopalakrusna Pattanayaka =

18th-century Odissi musician, poet and composer

Kabi Kalahansa - Basanta Kokila Gopalakrusna Pattanayaka
- ଗୋପାଳକୃଷ୍ଣ ପଟ୍ଟନାୟକ
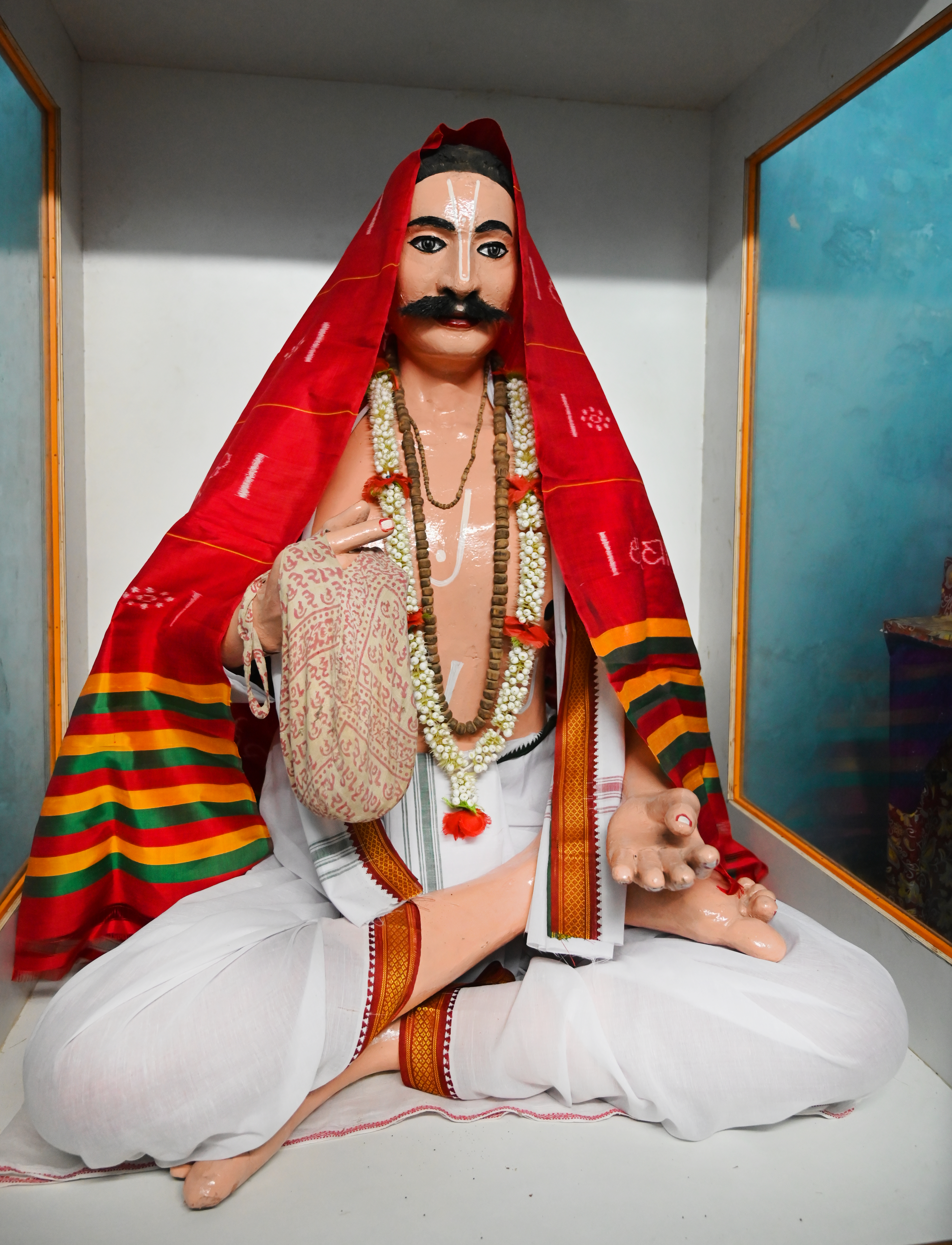
- Wooden statue of Gopalakrushna at his residence in Paralakhemundi, made by an artisan who had seen him in real life
- Born: 1784; Paralakhemundi, Odisha, India
- Died: 1862 (aged 77–78); Paralakhemundi, Odisha, India
- Occupation: Odissi poet-musician
- Writing career
- Language: Odia
- Genre: Odissi music

Gopalakrusna Pattanayaka (Alternatively spelled Gopalakrishna, Pattnaik; Gopāḷakruṣṇa Paṭṭanāyaka, Odia: [gopaːl̪ɔkrusɳɔ pɔʈʈɔnaːjɔkɔ]; 1784-1862) was an Odia poet & composer of Odissi music. His Odissi songs in various traditional ragas and talas are widely sung across the state, as well as other allied traditional artforms of Odisha, such as pala. The 20th-century Odissi musician, vocalist & binākara Apanna Panigrahi, also from the poet's hometown, was well-known for his renditions of Gopalakrusna's lyrics. Some of the most iconic Odissi songs, such as Syamaku Juhara Tara Premaku Juhara Ma, Jala Ani Jai Kali Kalindasutaku, Sangini Re Rasarangini Re, Kadamba Bane Bansi Bajila Re, Uthilu Ede Begi Kahinkire, Ki Nadare Prana Sangini, Manasija Mana Mohana are creations of Gopalakrusna. Many of his songs are popular abhinaya items in Odissi dance.

== Early life ==
Born in 1784 in an aristocratic Karan family of Paralakhemundi, Gopalakrusna's father Banabasi Pattanayaka was in the service of the Gajapati kings of the powerful princely state of Odisha. His mother's name was Lalita Dei. Ancestor of Gopalkrishna’s family was Mandhata Patnaik who was brought to Paralakhemundi by then Gajapati ruler of Paralakhemundi kingdom of Ganga dynasty to manage state affairs and administration, Mandhata Patnaik had migrated from Jajpur along with other Karanas and Paikas (soldiers), Mandhata Patnaik’s family was honoured as Kamsakabati Karanas in Jajpur, a descendant of Mandhata Patnaik was Banabasi Patnaik who served as the chief revenue officer of 21 villages of Paralakhemundi kingdom and received immense landed properties as Jagirs from the Gajapati Ruler, he was also an efficient and skilled Sanskrit grammarian of his time. Banabasi Patnaik was the father of Gopalakrushna Patnaik. At the age of twenty, Gopalakrusna was married to a young girl by the name of Hira Dei. In the early days of his life, Gopalakrusna remained in the service of the Gajapati king as a panjia karana, an accountant-scribe, after his father’s death he succeeded him as the chief revenue officer of the kingdom. Gopalakrushna Pattanayaka was also a skilled fighter and trained in warfare and Swordsmanship, a sword used by him is still preserved in the Kanakadurga (Istadevi or tutelary deity of Parala Rajas/kings) Temple, he sported a long moustache and used the title Varma in his poetry. Gopalakrushna Pattanayaka had also defeated and driven out sixteen cavalries of invading Pindari forces (renegades from the Maratha army) from Karana Sahi (Karana community villages) of Paralakhemundi kingdom with his sword.

== Life as a Poet ==
Later, after training from the virtuoso musician poet Bakrabak Chakrapani Pattanayaka, his fame as a poet and musician grew and the king subsequently offered him an exclusive position in the court to encourage his musical & literary pursuits. Kabisurjya Baladeba Ratha and Utkala Ghanta Jadumani Mahapatra were his contemporaries. Another Odissi musician, the poet Haribandhu was inspired by Gopalakrusna to write lyrics and set them to music. Haribandhu is credited with documenting a significant number of Gopalakrusna's songs, as the poet himself was not concerned with preserving his songs. Gopalakrusna would sing impromptu, overcome by divine inspiration and Haribandhu as a child would follow him, noting everything down onto a palm leaf.

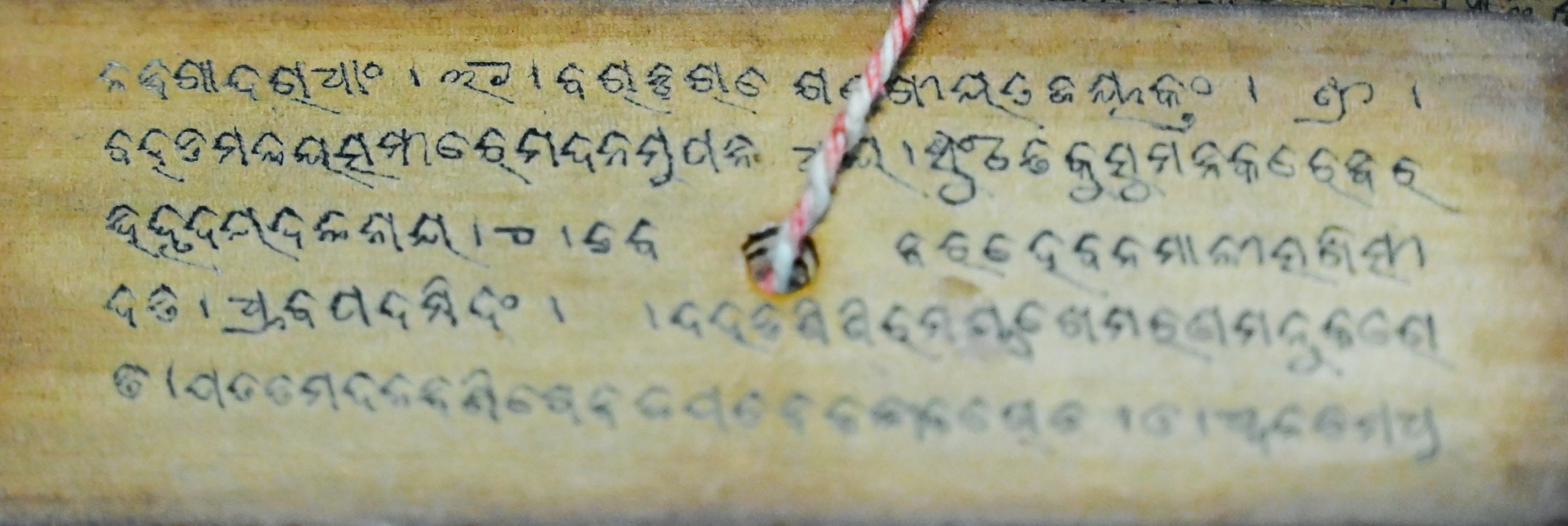
Gopalakrusna's handwritten talapatra pothi (palm leaf manuscript) of Jayadeva's Gitagovinda, in Odia script

== Legacy ==
Gopalakrusna's writings have been published as anthologies more than once. The first significant anthology was made by the poet's own great-grandson, Ramakrusna Pattanayaka in 1919. Before Ramakrusna's anthology, smaller collections of the poet's work had appeared in bits and pieces in Damodar Patnaik's Sangita Sagara (1889-1903) and Gobinda Ratha's Chaupadi Chandrodaya (1895). The Gajapati press in Paralakhemundi had also published small booklets of the poet's work in the early 1900s. Subsequently, larger anthologies have been collated and published by Babaji Baisnaba Charana Dasa (195-60), Kabichandra Kali Charan Patnaik (1959), Saroj Kumar Panigrahi (1969) and Dr. Krushna Charan Behera (2002).

A musical album called Lyrics of Gopalakrushna was made by the involvement of leading Odissi musicians and erstwhile chief minister Nandini Satapathy in the year 1970. Eminent Gurus such as Sangita Sudhakara Balakrushna Dash, Shyamamani Devi, Suramani Raghunath Panigrahi, Bhubaneswari Mishra and Indira Pratihari lent their voices to the various tracks.

Gopalakrusna died in 1862. His last poem is said to be a prophecy of his death :

ଜୀବ ଯିବାକୁ ହୋଇଲା ସଜ
ରାଧେ ଗୋବିନ୍ଦ ଭଜ

Translation:

The life is ready to depart
utter the names of Radhe Gobinda!

At the poet's residence in Paralakhemundi, there is a life-size wooden statue of the poet. This statues was made in 1921 by Brundabana Chandra Patnaik, an elderly craftsman who had seen the poet during his lifetime. Some other items of his use, such as a karani stylus used by Odia scribes and his bodybuilding tools are preserved by the family.

== Compositions ==
Some well-known Odissi compositions of the poet are:

- Brajaku Chora Asichi
- Patha Chhadi De Mu Jibi Phula Toli
- Kananara Bitanare
- Muhamuhin Kisora Chandramankara Mora
- Karuthili Mun Nahi Nahi Re
- Bajuchhi Sahi Bajare To Naare Brajabajare
- Chhailabara Chhamure Padili
- Aja Sri Gostha Chandrama
- Banchiba Kehire
- Syama Ja Ja Juhara To Piratiki
- Bhaja Mana Brajabana Dwijarajanku
- Kaha Re Sangini Ke Se Nua Lalana
- Etharaka Syama Dosa Kara Khyama
- Anusarita Prabhu Kala Jaka Gala Sarita
- Ki Sunili Aja Νua Kari Re
- Mote Laganare Brajabidhu Lata
- Mohana Riti Chinha Padila Ma

Many of Gopalakrusna's compositions have become iconic in the voice of legendary Odissi musicians, such as :

- Mohana Madhuri Dekhithila Nari by Apanna Panigrahi
- Mane Paduchhi Re Sehi Chandramukha by Mohan Sunder Deb Goswami
- Gostha Chandrama Asibe Aja by Tarini Charan Patra
- Ki Nama Boilu Tuhi Go Lalite by Banikantha Nimai Charan Harichandan
- Brajendra Nandana Sahi Eka Sri Radhara by Banikantha Nimai Charan Harichandan
- Kanta Mora E Basanta Kalare by Banikantha Nimai Charan Harichandan
- Banchiba Kehire by Singhari Shyamasundar Kar
- Aja Sri Gostha Chandrama by Balakrushna Dash
- Kaha Chitta Taha by Balakrushna Dash
- E Ghana Dina Eka Nebe Ki Kari by Balakrushna Dash
- Galabele Mo Jiba by Balakrushna Dash
- Manasija Mana Mohana by Raghunath Panigrahi
- Ki Nadare Prana Sangini by Raghunath Panigrahi
- Syamaku Juhara Tara Premaku Juhara by Shyamamani Devi
- Syama Apabada Mote Lagithau by Shyamamani Devi
- Kadamba Bane Bansi Bajila by Bhubaneswari Mishra
- Jala Ani Jai Kali by Bhubaneswari Mishra

== Lineage ==
Mandhata Pattanayaka
Nandakisora (Kisora)
Bhaskara
Bansidhari
Lalita Dei	Banabasi	Brajabasi
Hiramani	Gopalakrusna	Jayakrusna	Kanheichanda	Radhakrusna
Sunama	Gaurachandra	Haribandhu	Karunanidhi	Lalita Ma	Bisakha	Sudebi	Nityananda	Magata	Chaitanya	Gorachanda	Bankabihari
Gopinatha	Baisnaba
Ramakrusna	Surjyanarayana	Nilamani	Banabasi	Gobindachandra	Chakrapani
