= Gopal Chandra Panda =

Odissi Singer and Guru

Gopal Chandra Panda ଗୋପାଳ ଚନ୍ଦ୍ର ପଣ୍ଡା
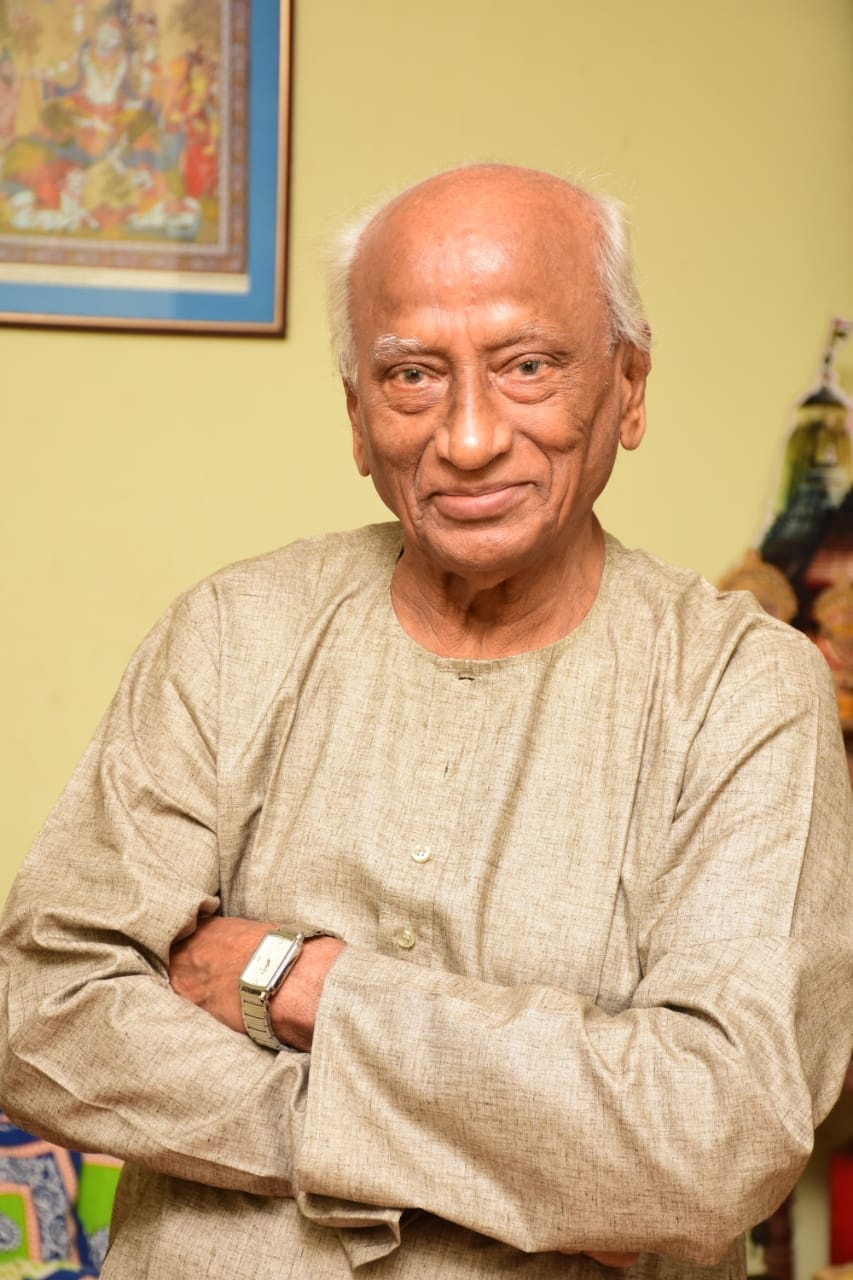
- Pt. Panda at his residence in Bhubaneswar, Odisha

Background information
- Born: Gopal Chandra Panda; 17 June 1940; Ramakrusnapura, Bhadrak, Odisha
- Genres: Odissi music
- Occupations: Odissi music Guru, musicologist, vocalist & composer
- Awards: Sangeet Natak Akademi Award 2011

Pandit Gopal Chandra Panda (Odia: ଗୋପାଳ ଚନ୍ଦ୍ର ପଣ୍ଡା, romanized: Gopāḷa Chandra Paṇḍā, Odia: [gopaːɭɔ t͡ʃɔnd̪ɾɔ pɔɳɖaː]; born 1940) is a Guru of Odissi classical music, vocalist, researcher and composer. A disciple of Singhari Shyamsundar Kar, he has authored several books such as Odissi Raga Ratnabali & Odissi Raga Darpana, and is acclaimed for his efforts to collect & document several traditional Odissi ragas from the hinterlands. Panda served as a lecturer and head of department in the Utkal Sangeet Mahavidyalaya for nearly three decades. He has performed in music festivals across the country and is the founder of the Gopal Panda Odissi Academy. In 2011, Panda received the Sangeet Natak Akademi Award for his contributions to Odissi music.

Panda started his initial training in Odissi music from his father Nilamani Panda and his elder brother Nandakishore Panda. He continued his training under Guru Damodar Panda and Adiguru Singhari Shyamsundar Kar. He served as a lecturer in the Utkal Sangeet Mahavidyalaya from 1972 onwards, and as the head of the Odissi music department from 1984 to 1998. Panda's disciples are among the foremost exponents of Odissi music in the present times, including Guru Ramhari Das, Mitali Chinara and Binod Bihari Panda. His daughters Sangita Panda and Sarita Panda are renowned vocalists.

He has collected and documented traditional compositions in over a hundred Ragas in his published works. Panda's compositions are widely sung in Odissi music recitals and employed in Odissi dance. He has worked closely with the founding Gurus of Odissi dance, including Guru Deba Prasad Das and toured around the globe as the chief singer for recitals of Indrani Rahman, one of the first professional Odissi dancers. Panda has also composed all the ashtapadis of Jayadeva's Gitagovinda following the original Raga-Tala indications of the 12th-century poet, in an attempt to approximate a reconstruction of the same.

== Life ==
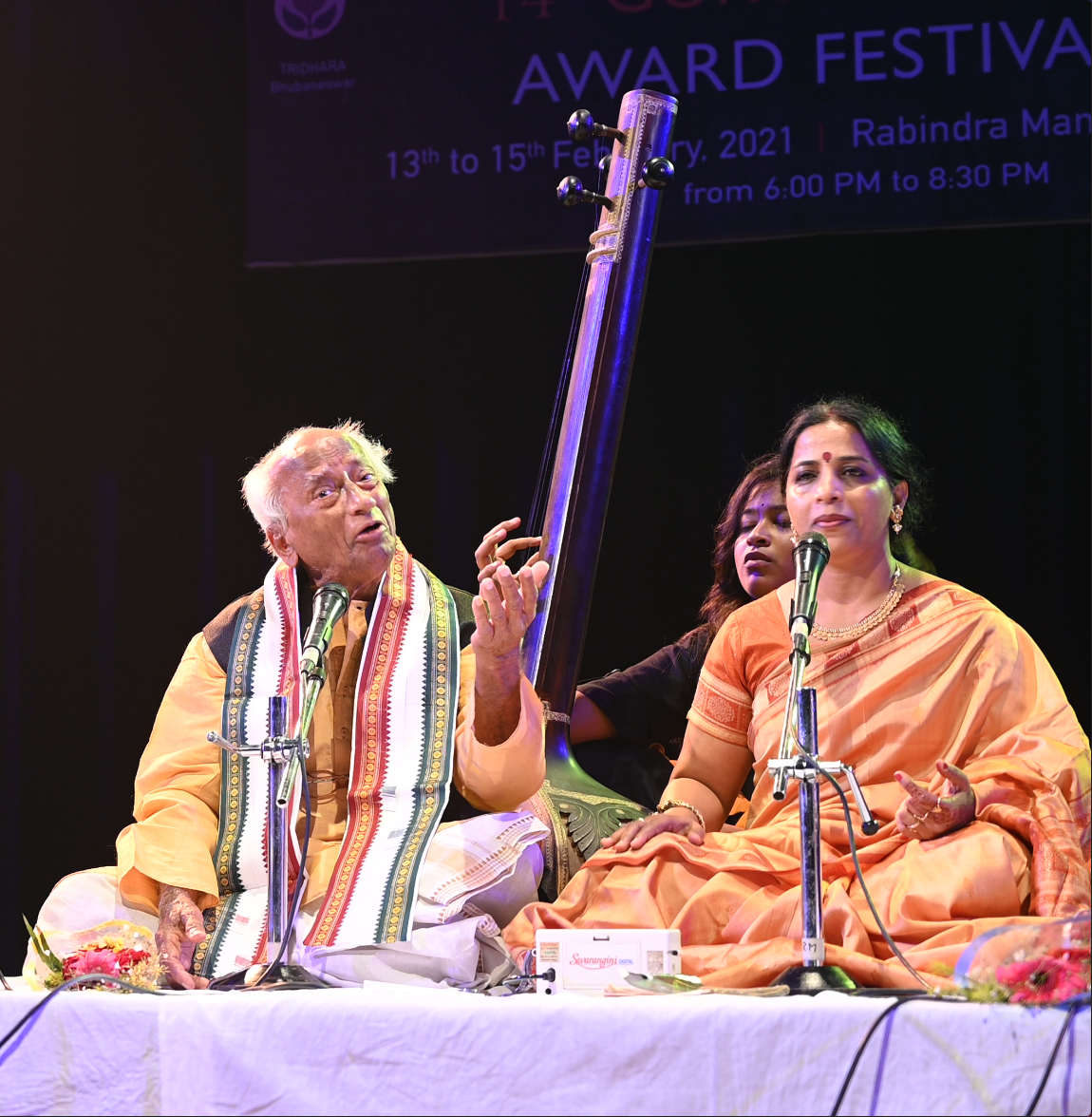
Pt. Gopal Chandra Panda performing with his daughter Smt. Sangita Panda

Gopal Chandra Panda was born in the village of Ramakrusnapura in the Bhadrak district of Odisha in 1940. His father Nilamani Panda initiated him into Odissi music, and his elder brother Nandakishore Panda continued his musical training. He further learned Odissi music under Guru Damodar Panda and Gayakaratna Guru Singhari Shyamsundar Kar. Panda also learned Hindustani music from Pt. Kundala Adinarayana and Pt. Gobind Chandra Paluskar.

He received a Senior Research Fellowship from the Ministry of Human Resource Development, Government of India for his research on Odissi music.

== Research & institution ==
Panda established the Gopal Panda Odissi Academy, through which he imparts training in Odissi classical music to students. The academy has brought out several volumes of his research publications and accompanying audio recorded renditions by vocalists.

=== Annual festival ===
Every year, the academy organises an annual festival showcasing solo & group recitals of traditional Odissi ragas, Odissi dance performances and a comparative recital of a selected Raga by eminent musicians of the three streams of Indian classical music : Odissi, Hindustani & Carnatic. Guru Singhari Samman and Bhagabati Smruti Samman awards are conferred to musicians and musicologists. Nationally renowned artistes of Odissi music, such as Guru Ramhari Das, Guru Dhaneswar Swain (Odissi Mardala), Guru Sachidananda Das (Odissi Mardala) and of Hindustani & Carnatic music, such as Pt Vidyadhar Vyas, Pt K Vageesh, Sudha Raghunathan have performed in the festival. Among the dancers who have presented in the festival are Kumkum Mohanty, Madhavi Mudgal, Sujata Mahapatra, Meera Das, Ileana Citaristi, Ranjana Gauhar, Aloka Kanungo, Ramli Ibrahim, Durga Charan Mohanty, Leena Mohanty, Niranjan Rout.

Among the ragas elaborated in past editions of the annual festival are Abhiri, Bangala, Basanta, Bichitra Desakhya, Chinta Kamodi, Debakiri, Dhanasri, Goudi, Khambabati, Khanda Kamodi, Krusna Kedara, Madhukiri, Malaba, Mangala Kamodi, Mohana Kedara, Punnagabaradi, Ramakiri, Sindhu Kamodi, Tara.

Among the dance items presented in past editions of the festival are :

- Duet based on Ragas Mangala Gujjari, Lalitaa and Chakrakeli by Datuk Ramli Ibrahim and Gitika Shree (Malaysia)
- Saabari Pallavi and abhinaya based on Raga Madhu Saranga by Guru Meera Das
- Krusnakedara Pallavi, based on the Raga Krusna Kedara and cycling through all the important talas of Odissi music, by Guru Ileana Citaristi
- Gundakeri Pallavi and abhinaya based on Raga Rasa Manjari by Guru Madhavi Mudgal
- Ragavilasini based on Ragas Khambabati, Goudi, Desakhya by Jyoti Srivastava, Sushant Maharana

==== Recipients of Guru Singhari Samman ====
- Shyamamani Devi (2014)
- Minati Mishra (2017)
- Harmohan Khuntia (2018)
- Ramhari Das (2019)
- Ramesh Chandra Das (2020)

==== Recipients of Bhagabati Smruti Samman ====
- Arati Mishra (2014)
- Lata Ghosh (2017)
- Chapala Mishra (2018)
- Binapani Nayak (2019)
- Bhanumati Sahu (2020)

==== Recipients of Guru Gopal Panda Yuva Pratibha Samman ====
- Srinivas Satpathy (2017)
- Lingaraj Pradhan (2018)
- Rupak Kumar Parida (2019)
- Ajay Kumar Dash (2020)

== Awards and honours ==
- Sangeet Natak Akademi Award (2011)
- Orissa Sangeet Natak Akademi Award (2000)
- Srjan Guru Kelucharan Mohapatra Award (2009)
- Sangeet Saraswati Samman by Sangita Sudhakara Balakrushna Dash Foundation
- Ila Panda Smaraki Sangeet Samman
- KAMS Charity Lifetime Achievement Award (2021)

== See also ==
- Odissi music
- Mardala
- Gita Govinda
- Gitaprakasa
