= Utkal Sangeet Mahavidyalaya =

Performing Arts College in Bhubaneswar, Odisha, India

- ଉତ୍କଳ ସଙ୍ଗୀତ ମହାବିଦ୍ୟାଳୟ
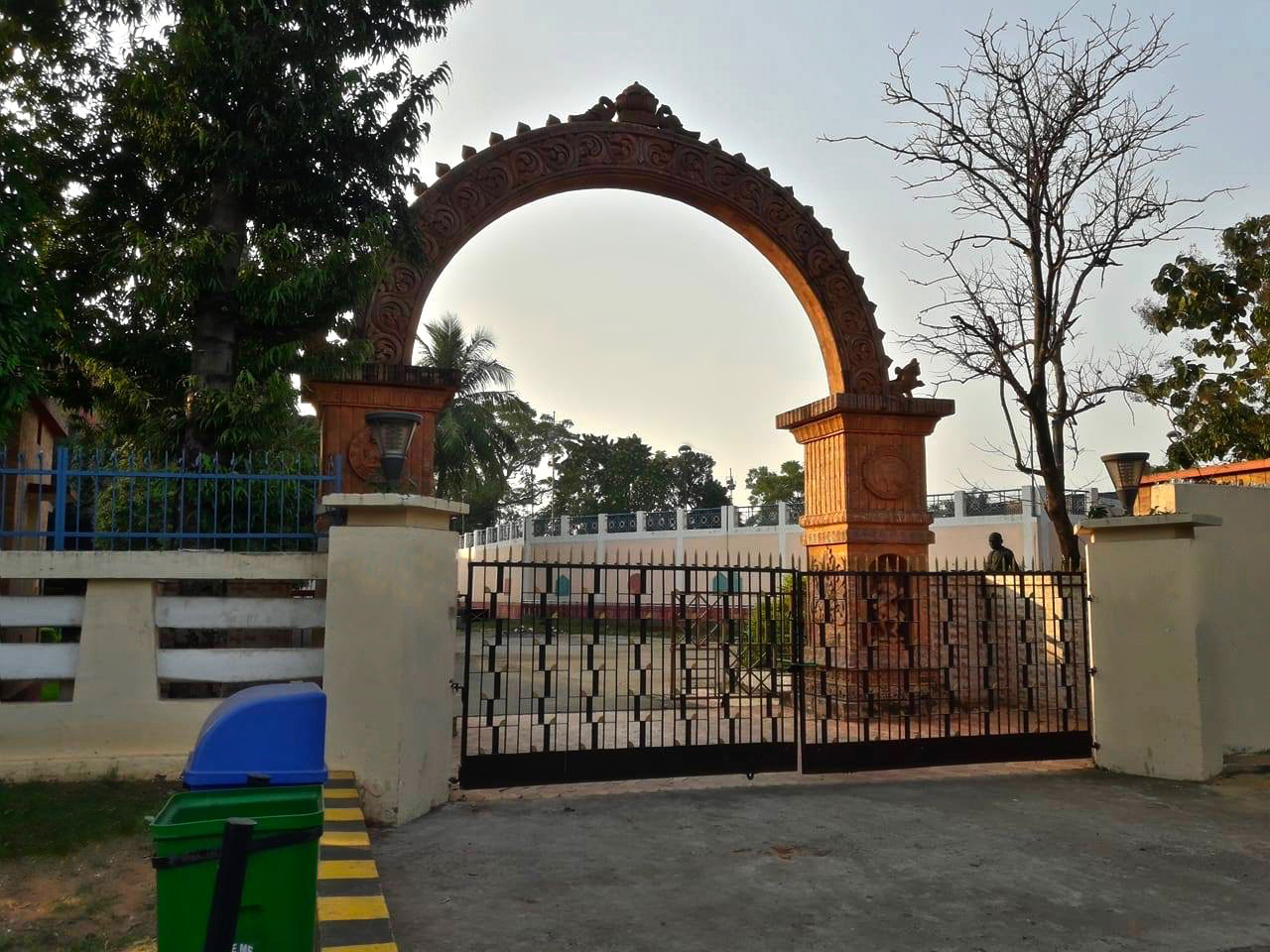
- Main Entrance of Utkal Sangeet Mahavidyalaya
- Other name: USM
- Type: Performing Arts
- Established: 16 April 1964
- Founder: Odisha Sangeet Natak Akademi (OSNA)
- Affiliations: CHSE, Odisha; Utkal University of Culture
- Principal: Dr. Bijaya Kumar Jena
- Location: Bhubaneswar, Odisha, 751020, India; 20°16′27.3″N 85°50′00.7″E
- Campus: Urban
- Website: www.usmbbsr.in

Utkal Sangeet Mahavidyalaya is a performing arts-cum-educational institution in Bhubaneswar, Odisha, India.

== History and Accreditation ==
Utkal Sangeet Mahavidyalaya was established by former Chief minister of Odisha Biju Patnaik on 14 April 1964, under Administrative Control of Odisha Sangeet Natak Academi (OSNA) till 1981. Then, from 1981 to 1999 it was affiliated to Utkal University.

Presently, Higher secondary course of this institution affiliated to CHSE, Odisha and Bachelor's and Master's Degree are affiliated to Utkal University of Culture since 1999.

== Academics ==
It has several departments in the performing arts that students can choose to pursue, such as dance, drama, classical vocal, different musical instruments.

- Department of Vocal Music
- Department of Instrumental Music
- Department of Dance
- Department of Drama

It offers 7 years of education and training, and includes a two year Higher Secondary School Certificate, a three year Bachelor of Arts, and a two year Master of Arts. Students are educated in the liberal arts and the performing arts at the same time. The Mahavidyalaya has been home to several luminaries in the world of Odissi music and Odissi dance over its history, both as its faculty and alumni.

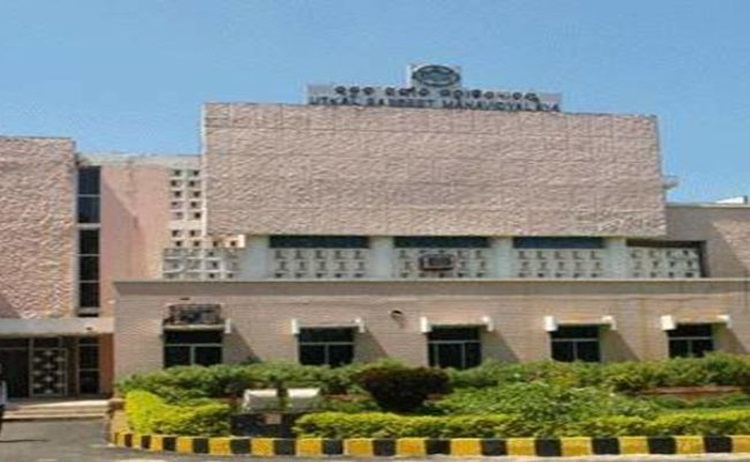
Utkal Sangeet Mahavidyalaya

== Notable faculty ==
Odissi music

- Singhari Shyamsundar Kar
- Markandeya Mahapatra
- Nrusingha Nath Khuntia
- Balakrushna Dash
- Gopal Chandra Panda
- Bhikari Charan Bal
- Ramhari Das
- Bijaya Kumar Jena

Odissi Mardala

- Banamali Maharana
- Mahadev Rout

Odissi dance

- Pankaj Charan Das
- Deba Prasad Das

== Notable alumni ==
- Hara Patnaik
- Raimohan Parida
- Ashrumochan Mohanty
- Harihara Mohapatra
- Subodh Patnaik (Theatre director)
- Rituraj Mohanty
- Jyoti Rout
- Gangadhar Pradhan
- Choudhury Bikash Das
- Vaswati Basu
- Durga Charan Ranbir
- Ramhari Das
- Sneha Samantray

== Gallery ==
=== During Golden Jubilee Celebration ===
On completing 50 years, the music school celebrated its Golden jubilee for five days in 2014. Around 1,200 participants and folk art groups of the state including Students, alumni, former and present faculty and staff members of Utkal Sangeet Mahavidyalaya participated in the golden jubilee celebrations. Celebrated by walking from Sachivalaya Marg to Ekamra Haat and then back to the college.

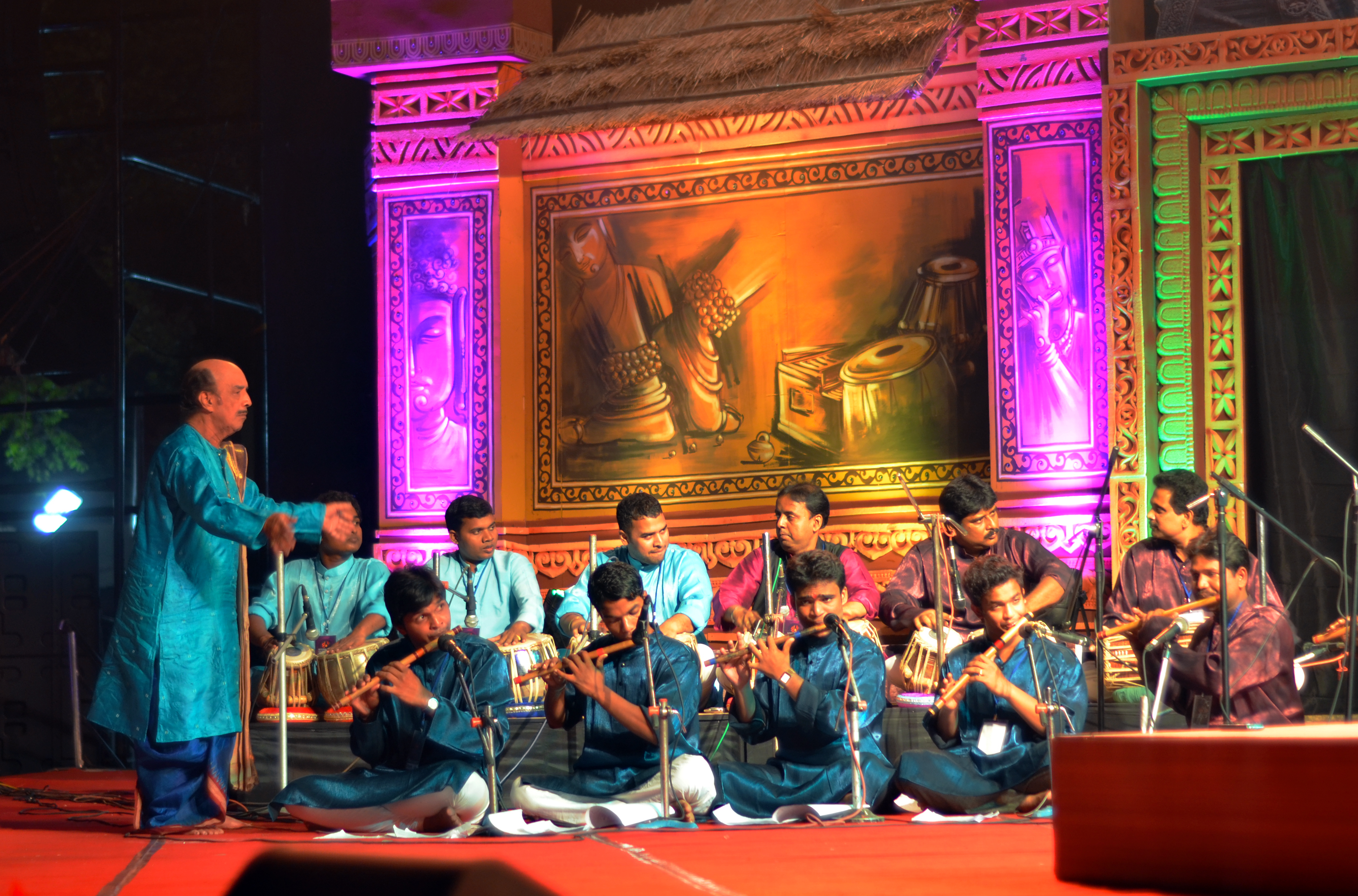
Mohini Mohan Patnaik orchestrating an Odissi music composition

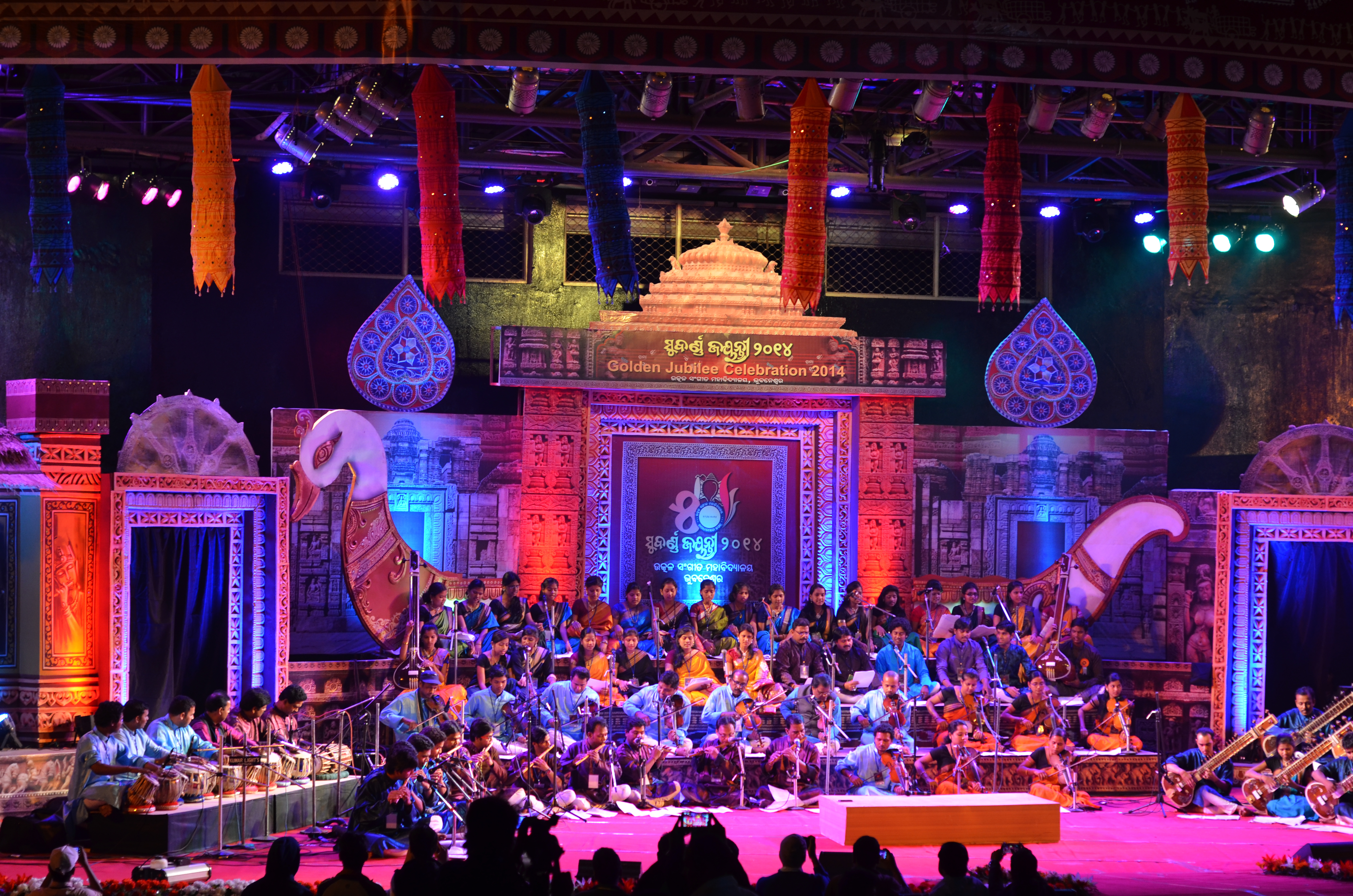
Odissi music composition

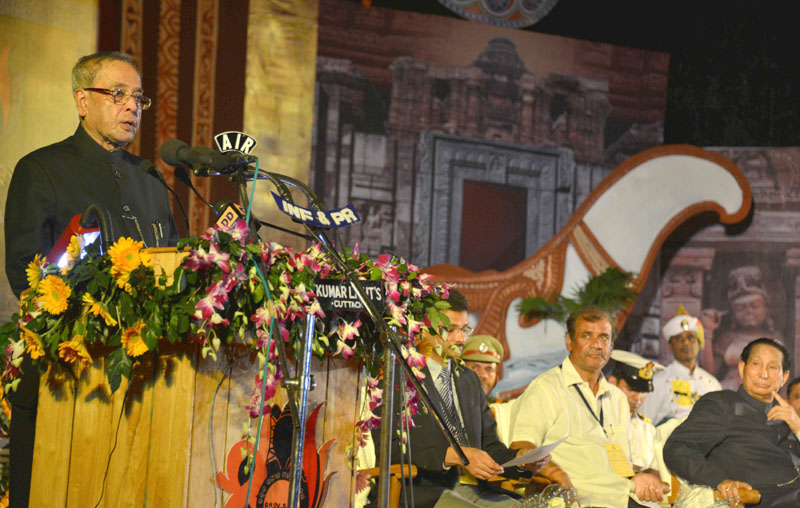
Former President Pranab Mukherjee giving a speech

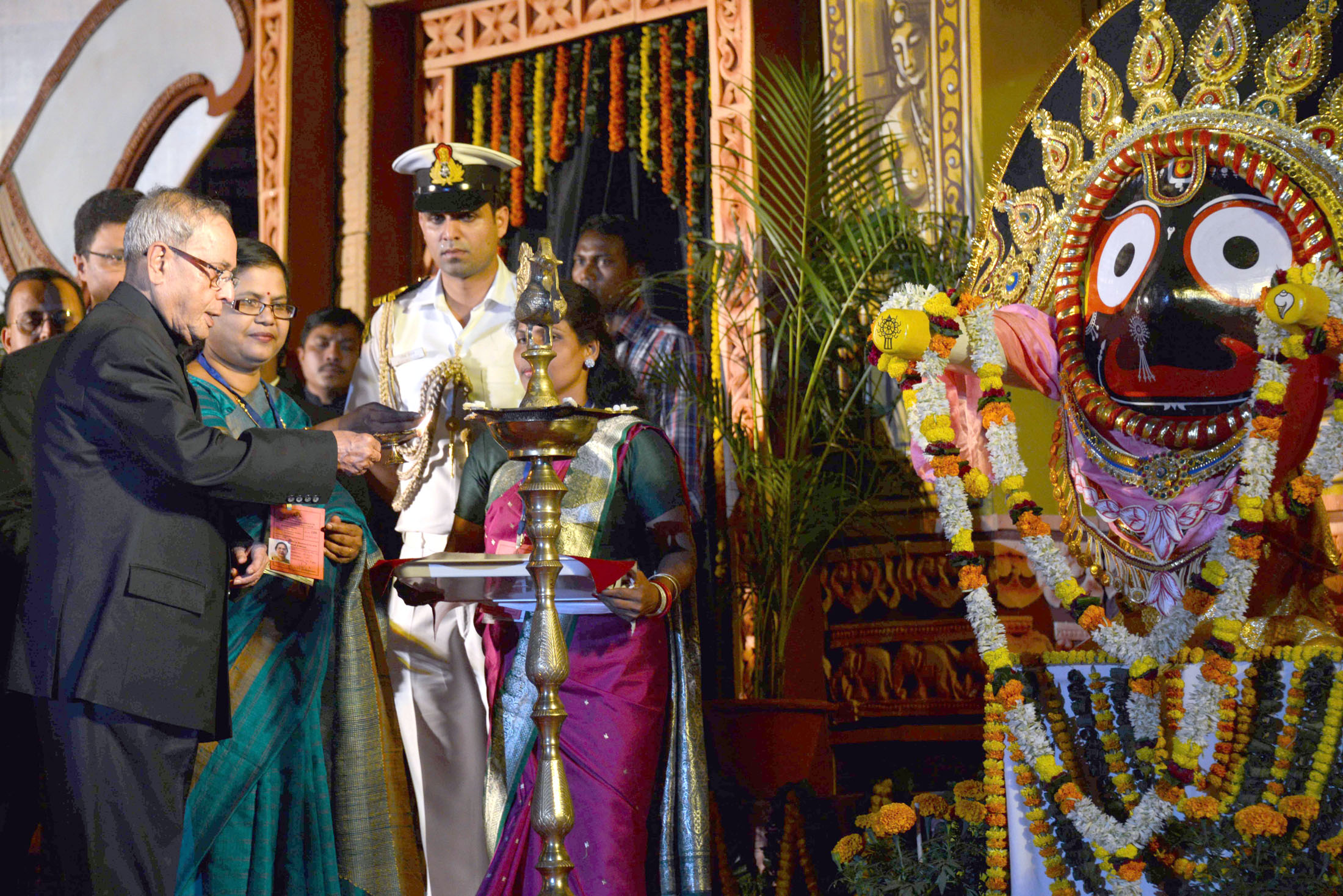
Former President Pranab Mukherjee lighting the lamp

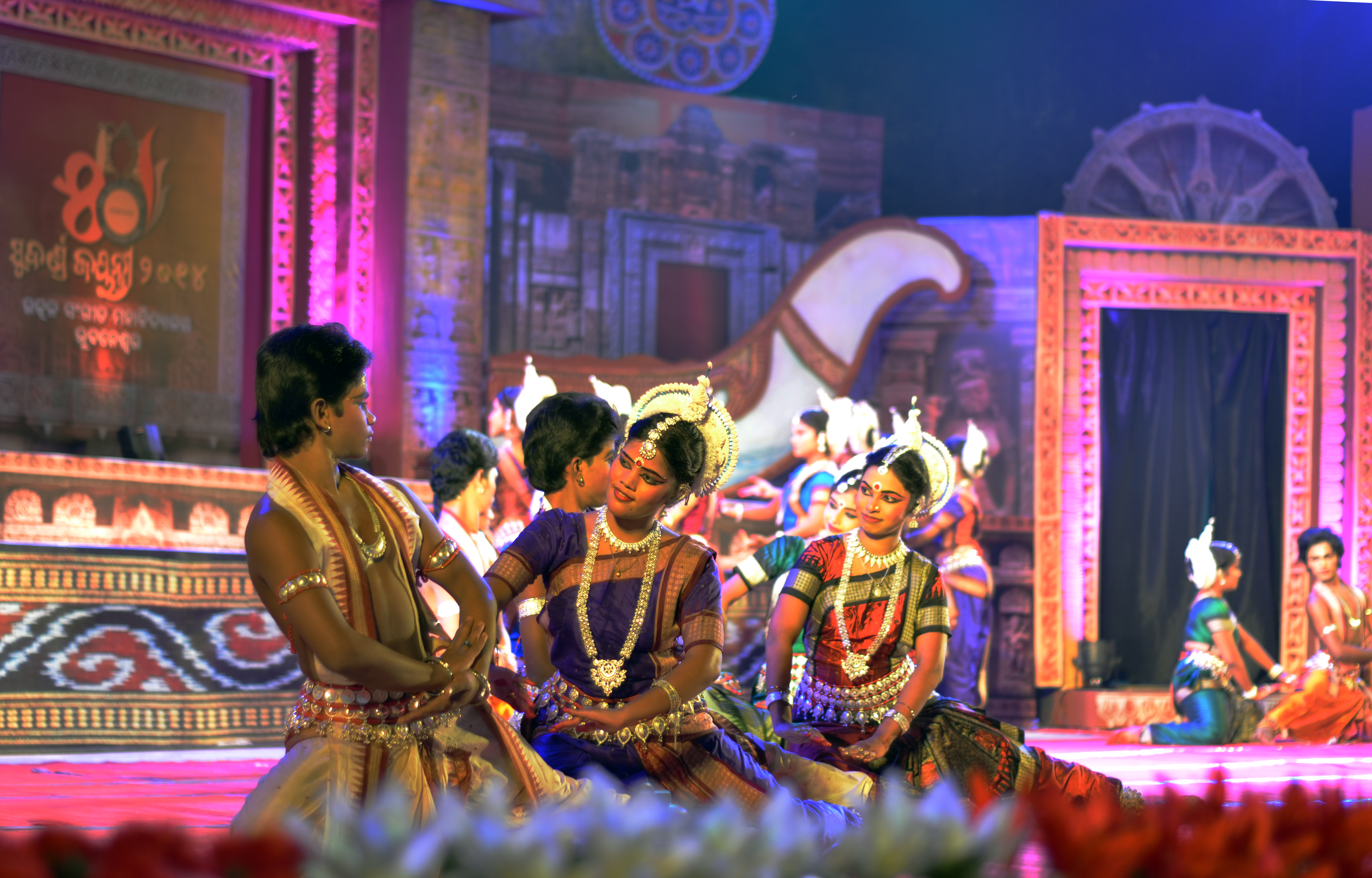
Odissi performance

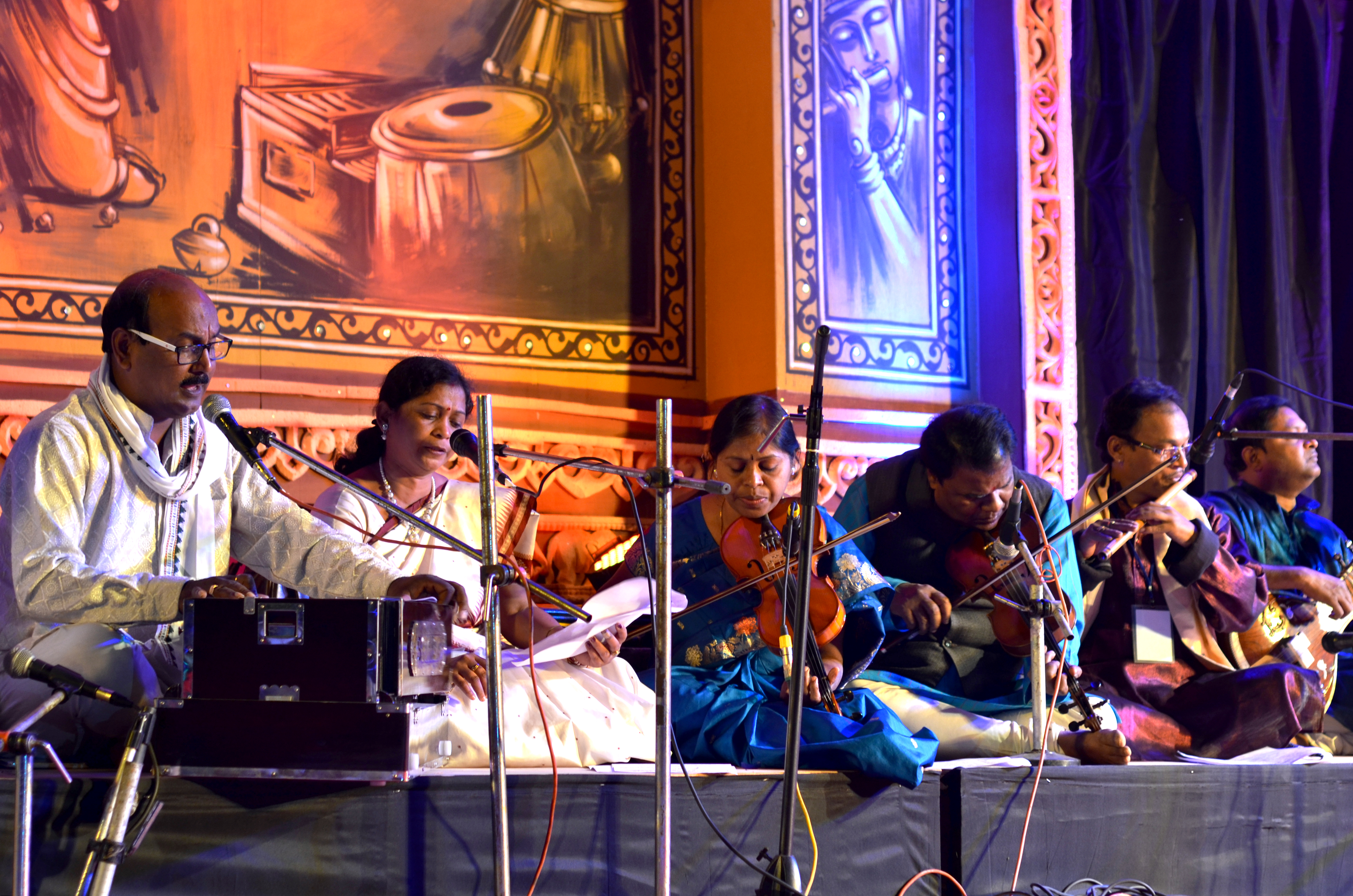
Nimakant Routray and troupe performing Odissi music

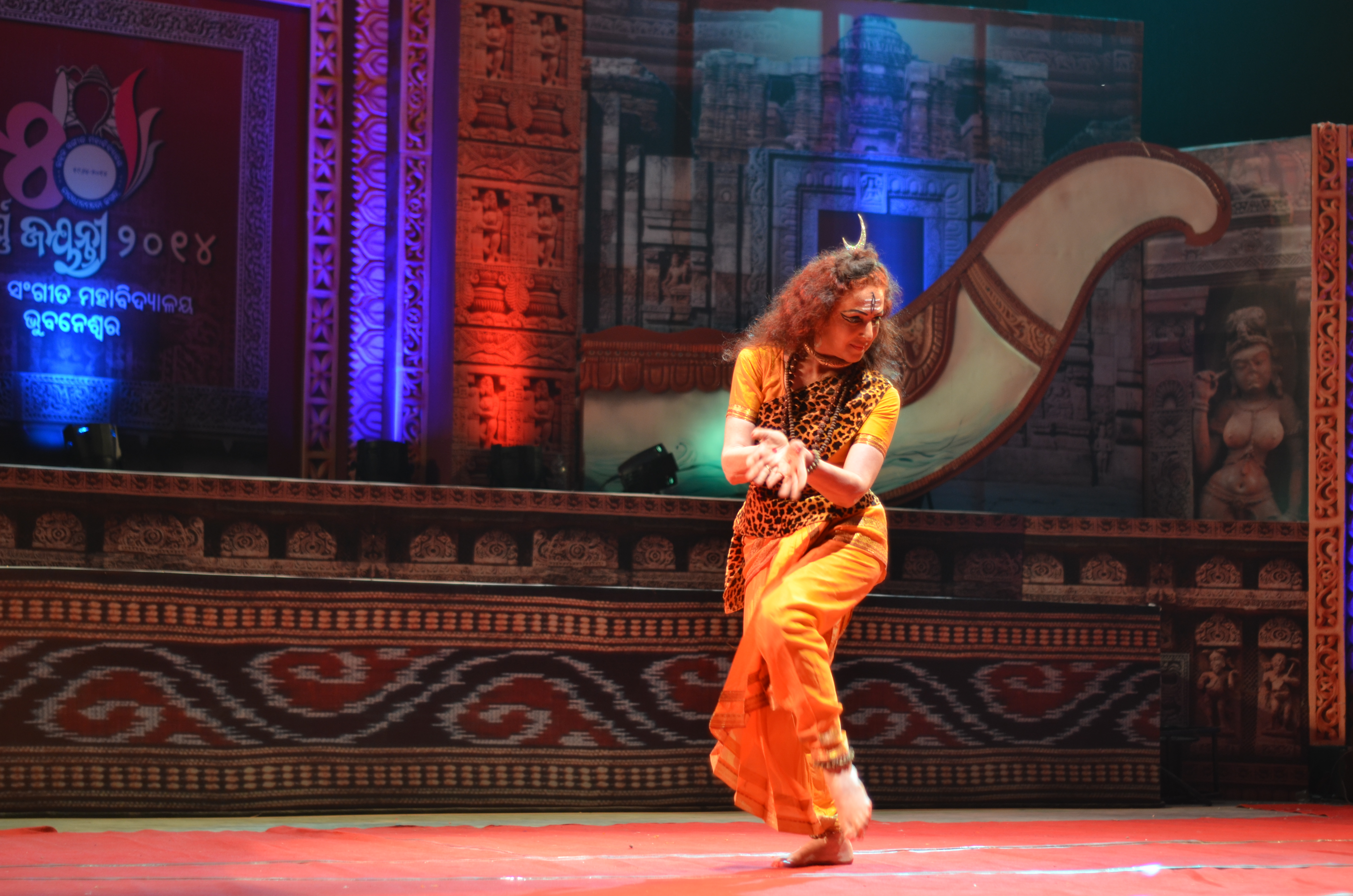
Ileana Citaristi performing Mayurbhanj Chhau

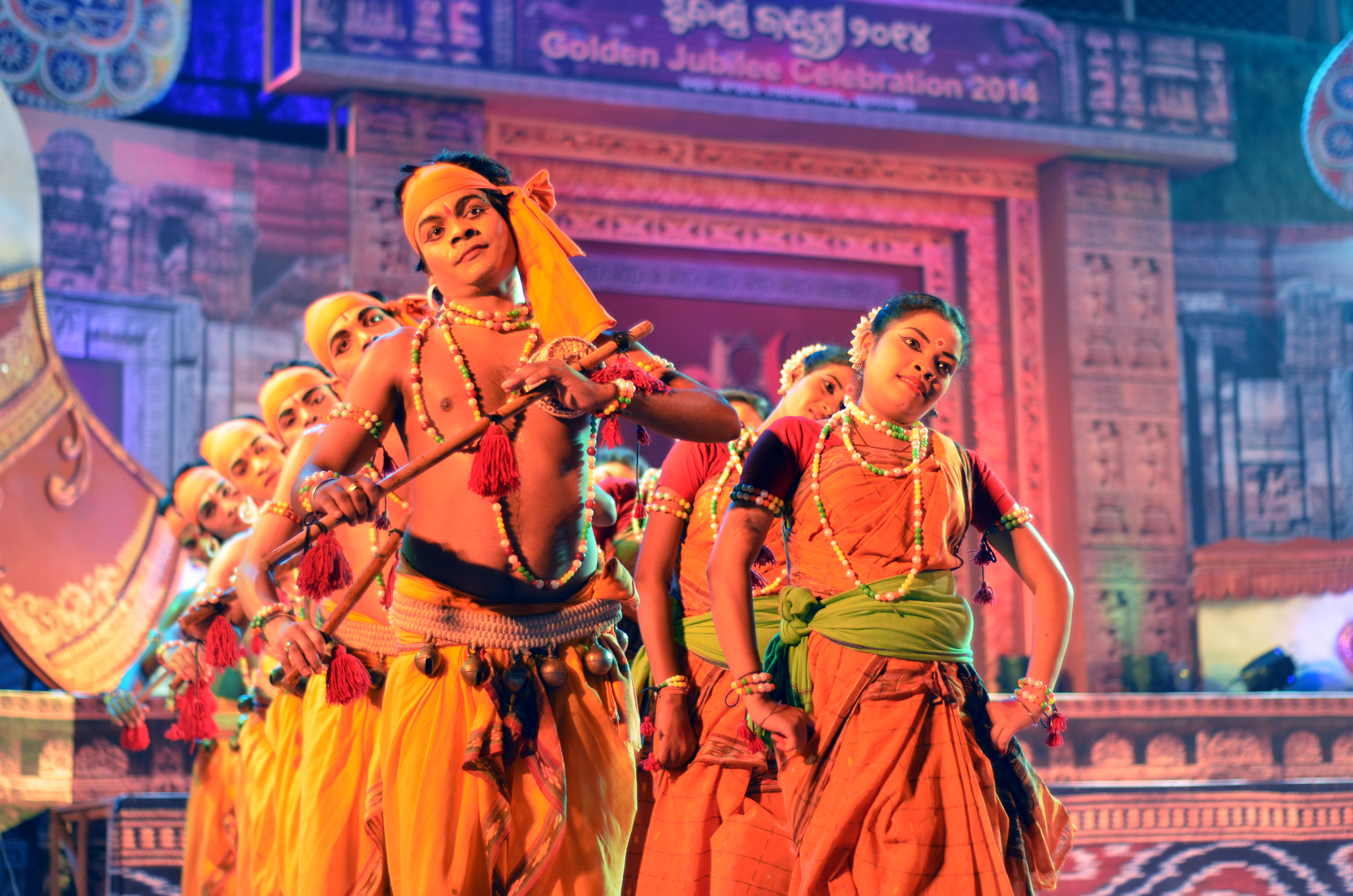
Artistes performing Mayurbhanj Chau with depiction of Krishna and gopi

== See also ==
- Utkal University
- Utkal University of Culture
- Sangeet Natak Akademi
- National School of Drama
