= Singhari Shyamsundar Kar =

Desaraja Maudamani Adiguru Singhari Shyamsundar Kar ସିଂହାରୀ ଶ୍ୟାମସୁନ୍ଦର କର
- Born: Singhari Shyamasundar Kar; 4 March 1908; Puri, Odisha
- Died: 13 March 1975 (aged 66)
- Genres: Odissi music
- Occupations: Odissi music Guru, singer, musicologist, composer
- Awards: Odisha Sangeet Natak Akademi Award 1972-73

Desaraja Adiguru Singhari Shyamasundar Kar (Odia: ସିଂହାରୀ ଶ୍ୟାମସୁନ୍ଦର କର, romanized: Singhāri Syāmasundara Kara, Odia: [siŋhaːri sjaːmɔsund̪ɔɾɔ kɔɾɔ]; 4 March 1908 – 16 March 1975) was a renowned Odissi musician, Guru, singer, scholar and composer. Born to a sebayata (servitor) family of the Jagannatha Temple, he was groomed under veteran masters of the temple tradition and soon rose to be one of the towering Gurus of Odissi classical music in the 20th century. He was most known for his powerful voice and intricate style, his command over the Mardala as well as his contribution towards the academic institutionalization of Odissi music education. Most of the performers of Odissi music, Mardala and Odissi dance of his period admit to having come under the commanding influence and knowledge of Singhari. He died on 16 March 1975.

Born to father Gobinda Chandra Kara and mother Padmabati Debi in the Manikarnika Sahi of Puri town, Shyamsundar was attracted to music from his childhood. He lost his father at a young age and his mother initiated him into music, teaching him traditional Odissi songs such as Kamala Lochana Chautisa, Manabodha Chautisa, Malasri, Suchitra, Mangala, Sarimana, Bhajana, Janana, Malika, 'Bali Re Bali', 'Utha Re Kanhu Kesaba Hari' and more. He would stay awake for several nights watching traditional musical plays such as Suanga and Lila. He began his initial training in both Odissi vocal music as well as the Mardala from veteran musicians of Kalika Kota in Puri, namely Guru Harihara Rayaguru, Guru Gadi Jagannatha Pratihari, Guru Kalpataru Nayaka, Guru Chintamani Mishra, Guru Managobinda Mahanti (popularly known as 'Andha Mana') and others. He had completed his education in a Sanskrit tola and served as a hereditary Singhari sebāyata (servitor) in the Jagannatha Temple.

He was a regular artist of Odissi music at All India Radio Kolkata (when there was no AIR centre in Odisha) and later in All India Radio Cuttack, often broadcasting Odissi songs, Chhanda, Champu, Bhajana & Janana. In 1954, he performed both Odissi vocal music as well as a Mardala recital as part of the All India Music Festival organised at Red Fort, New Delhi.

He was known for his intricate method of training, in which he emphasised 65 lakshanas of Odissi music. His presentation and teaching method was based on research and training with 32 veteran Gurus of the Odissi tradition, namely Gadi Jagannatha Pratihari, Badapanda Harihara Guru, Dwarikanatha Guru, Harihara Rayaguru, Nityananda Mahasuara, Sadhucharana Dasa, Managobinda Mahanti, Sura Dasa, Narasingha Misra, Narasingha Upadhyaya, Narasingha Adhikari, Chintamani Misra, Somanatha Chinhara, Bhikari Dalei, Bidya Misra, Durgabati Barma, Sindhujema Dei, Mohan Sundar Deb Goswami, Sankara Ratha, Brahmananda Goswami, Parsurama Sannyasi, Languli Baba, Gayaka Siromani Apanna Panigrahi etc. He is known for having to his credit several notable disciples, such as Pt Nrusingha Nath Khuntia, Pt Markandeya Mahapatra, Pt Kashinath Pujapanda, Pt Balakrushna Dash, Pt Lokanath Rath, Pt Lokanath Pala, Pt Gopal Chandra Panda, Pt Paschimeswar Jena, Vid Radhamani Mahapatra (Biswakarma), Vid Bishnupriya Samanta Singhara, Vid Shyamamani Devi, Pt Ghanashyam Panda, Vid Bhubaneswari Mishra, Pt Ramachandra Sahu, Pt Sukadeba Patri, Pt Akhil Kumar Lenka, Parasamani Debadasi etc. Among his disciples in Mardala are Guru Padmanabha Panda, Guru Basudeba Khuntia, Guru Chakradhara Sahu and Guru Dhaneswar Swain.

He served as a lecturer and head of department of Odissi vocal at Utkal Sangeet Mahavidyalaya, Bhubaneswar for several years. He also imparted training to students at Chamunda Mundi Jaga and Kalika Kota Jaga, ancient community halls of Puri town. At his Puri home, he established the Syamasundara Sangita Bidyalaya, an institution that continues to impart education in Odissi vocal music & Mardala.

For his efforts, he received the Odisha Sangeet Natak Akademi award for 1972–73. He died on 16 March 1975 (13 March as per some records).

== See also ==
- Odissi music
- Mardala
- Gita Govinda
- Gitaprakasa
