= Kedar Gouri =

- Directed by: Nitai Palit
- Written by: Manaranjan Das
- Produced by: Balaram Das
- Starring: Gour Ghose; Gloria Mohanty; Kishori Debi; Nitai Palit; Beena Palit; Dhira Biswal
- Music by: Balakrushna Das
- Production company: Radha Pictures
- Distributed by: Pancha Sakha Films
- Release date: 25 September 1954
- Running time: 176 min
- Country: India
- Language: Odia

Kedar Gouri (1954) is an Oriya film directed by Nitai Palit. The film is adapted from Radhanath Rai's poem by the same name.

== Synopsis ==
Kedar and Gouri have been deeply fond of each other since childhood. Kedar's father and Gouri's father are village heads and have a rivalry between them. As both Kedar and Gouri grow, their fondness transfers into intense and enduring love. But their families do not allow them to meet each other and place a barrier between them. Once Kedar in disguise tries to attend Gouri's birthday function. He is found out, humiliated and thrown out by Gouri's father. Now it is impossible for the lovers to meet as their families tighten the security for both of them. The lovers have no other option and elope from their home. While they venture in the jungle, Gauri feels very thirsty. Kedar goes to a nearby spring to bring water. When Kedar returns with water, he cannot find Gouri anywhere around. He tires in search of Gouri's whereabouts. In the meantime, he hears a tiger's rumble suddenly at some distance away. He, in panic, searches for Gouri. On the way he finds the blood stained clothes of Gouri. Kedar is now sure that Gouri has been eaten by the tiger. In an anguish and frustration, Kedar stabs himself repeatedly until he is dead. But to the contrary, Gouri is safely hidden in some brush away from the scene. She comes back to the scene after the tiger disappears. Her heart breaks when she finds Kedar died for her sake. Gauri feels she cannot live without Kedar and follows suit. Thus the lovers bring an end to their lives for each to imprint a sublime love story.

== Cast ==
- Gaura Ghosh... Kedar
- Gloria Mahanty... Gouri
- Beena Palit
- Kishori Devi
- Nityanand Palit
- Dhira Biswal
- Lakshmi
- Sanyukta Panigrahi
- Radharani
- Rita
- Sheela Ullash

== Soundtrack ==
1. "Kehi Ki Dekhichha Palli Ma Ra Hasa Ra"
2. "Rama Je Laikhana Ho Gale Mruga Mari"

== Box office ==
Despite good acting and cinematography, the film flopped. The masses could not digest a tragic love story of this genre.
