= Jyoti Rout =

Indian classical dancer

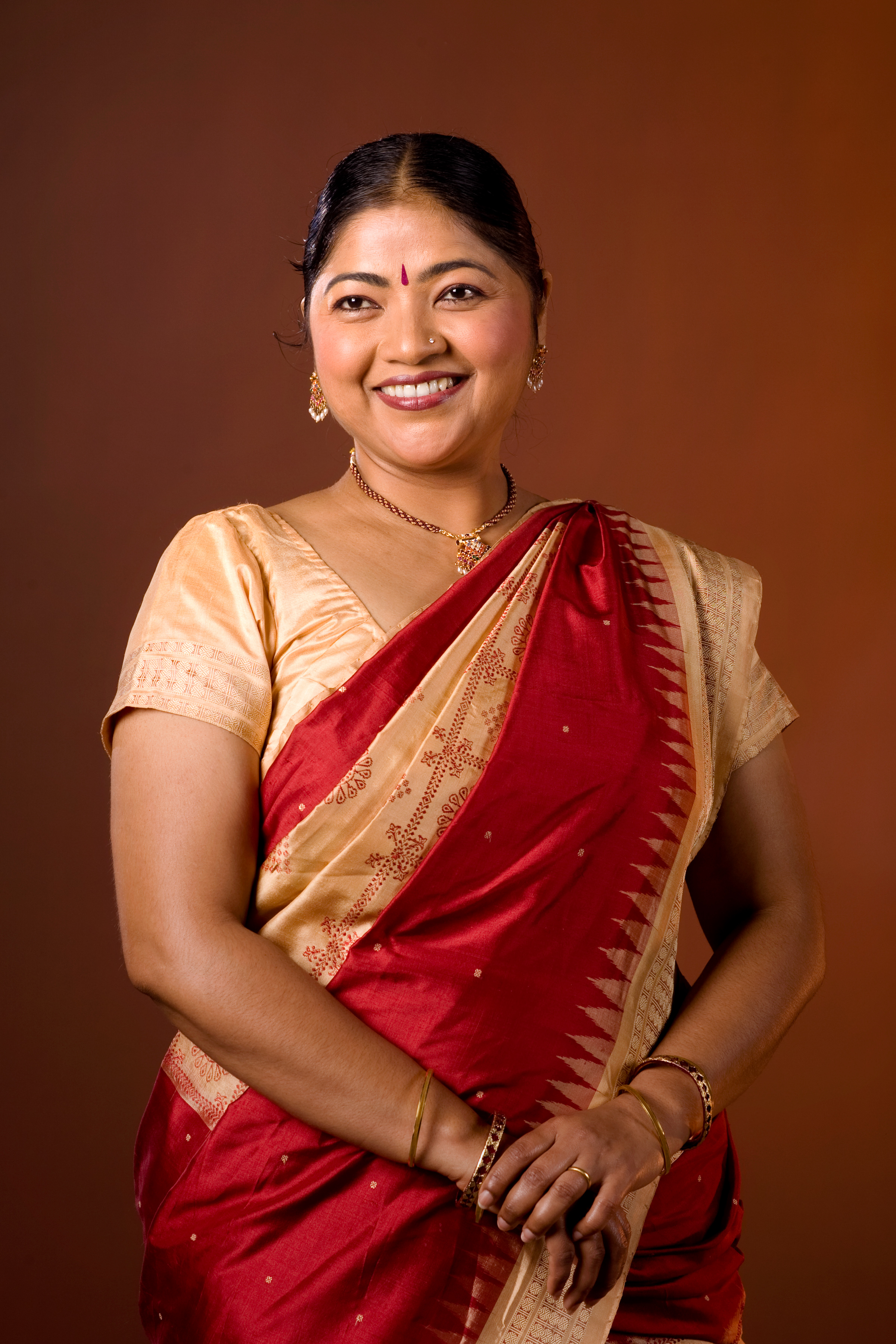
- Jyoti Rout in 2007
- Born: 15 July 1965 (age 61); Joda, Odisha
- Occupations: Indian classical dancer, performer, choreographer
- Website: jyotikalamandir.org

Jyoti Rout (born July 15, 1965) is an Indian classical dancer, teacher and choreographer of Odissi dancing style.

== Early life and background ==
Jyoti Rout grew up in the remote town of Joda in Odisha, India. Her interest in dance began in her childhood, where she used to see local tribal dance programs during various festivals. She later received a master's degree in Odissi dance from the music and dance college Utkal Sangeet Mahavidyalaya in Bhubaneswar, Odisha, and was one of the first women to study and perform Chau dance, a martial art dance form from Odisha.

== Career ==
In 1993, Jyoti Rout became the first dancer to perform for Lord Jagannath in Puri, Odisha, after the Deva Dasi (temple dancer) tradition had ended under the British rule. In 1997, she founded the California-based Odissi dance school Jyoti Kala Mandir, College of Indian Classical Arts, which is currently based in Fremont, California, USA. In 2012, she established a branch in Lingipur Bhubaneswar, Odisha, India.

== Awards ==
- Outstanding choreography from the Ethnic Dance Festival, San Francisco, 2006.
- Pride of India National Award
- Shri Kshetra Mahari, Puri, Odisha.
- Shrestha Odiani, Cuttack, Odisha.
- Kalashree by OSA, USA.
- Nirtya Siromani by Olympiad Odisha.
- Nirtya Shree State Award by Madhur Jhankar, Bhubaneswar, Odisha.
- Odisha Diary's "Odisha Living Legend Award" for her contribution to the art form in two continents, Bhubaneswar, Odisha, 2016.

Mahari Award from Guru Pankaj Charan Das foundation, Odisha, 2017
