= Natya Chetana =

- ନାଟ୍ୟ ଚେତନା
- Logo of Natya chetana
- Formation: 10 November 1986
- Type: Theatre group
- Purpose: Folk play
- Members: 25
- Artistic director: Subodh Patnaik
- Website: natyachetana.in

Natya Chetana is an Indian theatre group based in Bhubaneswar, Odisha. It has built a theatre village called 'Natya Gram' near capital city Bhubaneswar.

== History ==
Natya Chetana was formed by Subodh Patnaik in 10 November 1986. He is the founder and director of this theatre group.

== Etymology ==
The word 'Natya Chetana' is derived from two Sanskrit word. One is "Natya' means Theatre and another one is 'Chetana', meaning Awareness. So 'Natya Chetana 'means 'Theatre for awareness'.

== Members ==
This theatre group consist of 25 members of which 18 are men and 7 are women. The group is guided by founder director Subodh Patnaik. The troupe has performed in various national and international theatre feastivals.

== Achievements ==
All leading theatre organisations of India likes of National School of Drama, Sangeet Natak Akademi and Nandikar have invited 'Natya Chetana" to perform in festivals organised by them. Director Subodh Patnaik has been representing Natya Chetana in World Theatre Congress held all over the world every year since 1995.

== See also ==
- Nandikar
- Subodh Patnaik (Theatre director)
