= Shyamamani Devi =

Kokila Kanthi Shyamamani Devi ଶ୍ୟାମାମଣି ଦେବୀ
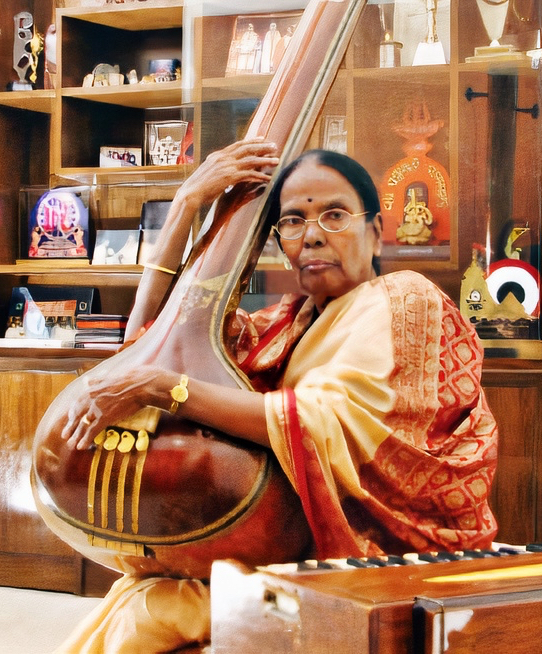

Background information
- Birth name: Shyamamani Pattnaik
- Born: 21 December 1938; Banki, Cuttack, Odisha
- Genres: Odissi music
- Occupations: Vocalist & composer
- Awards: Sangeet Natak Akademi Award 2011

Shyamamani Devi (Odia: ଶ୍ୟାମାମଣି ଦେବୀ, romanized: Syāmāmaṇi Debi; born 1938) is a Odissi classical music vocalist composer. A disciple of Gurus Singhari Shyamsundar Kar and Balakrushna Dash, she is known for her popular renditions of classical Odissi music, such as Odissi, Chhanda, Champu, etc. authored by medieval Odia musician-poets such as Upendra Bhanja, Kabisurjya Baladeba Ratha, Banamali Dasa, Gopalakrusna and others. She is also known for her renditions of light music such as traditional Odia folk music ,Odia film music and adhunika songs. In 2022, she was awarded the Padma Shri for he contributions to Odissi music.

Born to Rajendra Mohan Pattnaik and Nishamani Pattnaik, Shyamamani belonged to a musical lineage. She was the youngest among five siblings. The eminent Odissi musician and dramatist Kalicharan Pattnaik was her uncle. In her childhood, she faced opposition from the society due to her interest in music, but continued her musical education with the support of her father and Kalicharan Pattnaik. At the age of 12 in 1950, she began singing at All India Radio Cuttack. She began her formal training in classical music under Adiguru Pt Singhari Shyamsundar Kar and Sangita Sudhakara Pt Balakrushna Dash. Later she undertook a course in voice culture under B. R. Deodhar. She also learned from Kundala Adinarayana Rao for a while.

She married Mayadhar Behera, a medicine practitioner. The couple had a son and two daughters.

In 2018, filmmaker Santosh Gaur directed a documentary on her life and work titled "Shyamamani Devi - Odissi Classical vocalist".

== Awards and honours ==
- Odisha Sangeet Natak Akademi Award (1994)
- Lifetime achievement award from Chandigarh University (2004)
- Honorary doctorate from Utkal University of Culture (2012)
- Guru Singhari Samman by Guru Gopal Panda Odissi Academy (2014)
- Guru Sahadev Padhi Memorial Samman (2016)
- Guru Kelucharan Mohapatra Award by Srjan (2017)
- Deba Prasad Das Samman by Guru Debaprasad Das Foundation (2018)
- Kabi Samrat Upendra Bhanja Award (2019)
- Padma Shri (2022)
