= Arabinda Muduli =

Sworaarabinda Arabinda Muduli
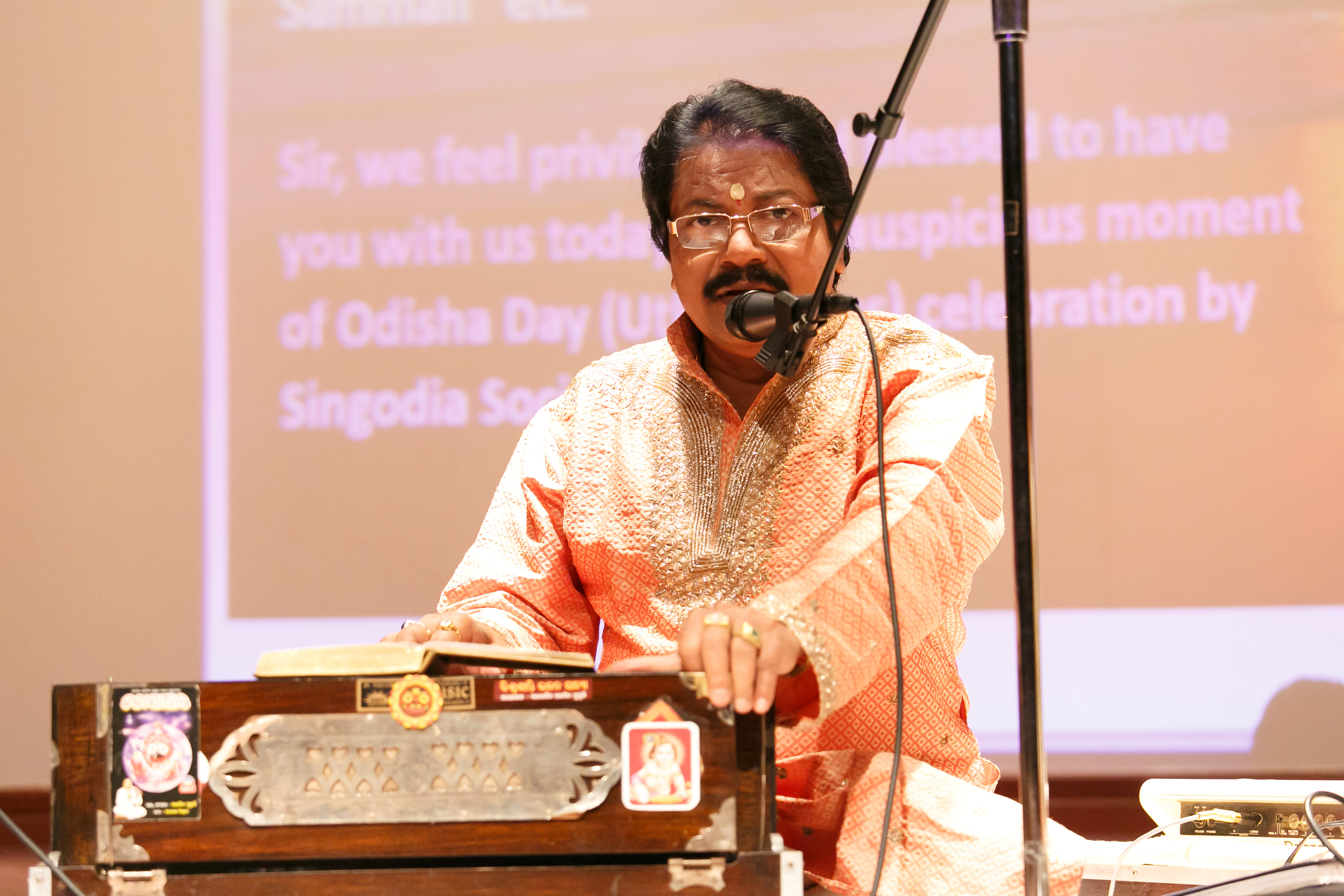
- Arabinda Muduli Performing at Singpost Auditorium, Singapore on 23 April 2016
- Born: 1 September 1961; Khordha, Odisha, India
- Died: 1 March 2018 (aged 56); Bhubaneswar, Odisha, India
- Citizenship: Indian
- Education: Kalabikash Kendra, Cuttack
- Occupations: Singer, lyricist, musician
- Years active: 1985–2018
- Organization(s): Biswashanti Bhajansandhya, Bhubaneswar
- Known for: Bhajan
- Website: Official Website

Signature
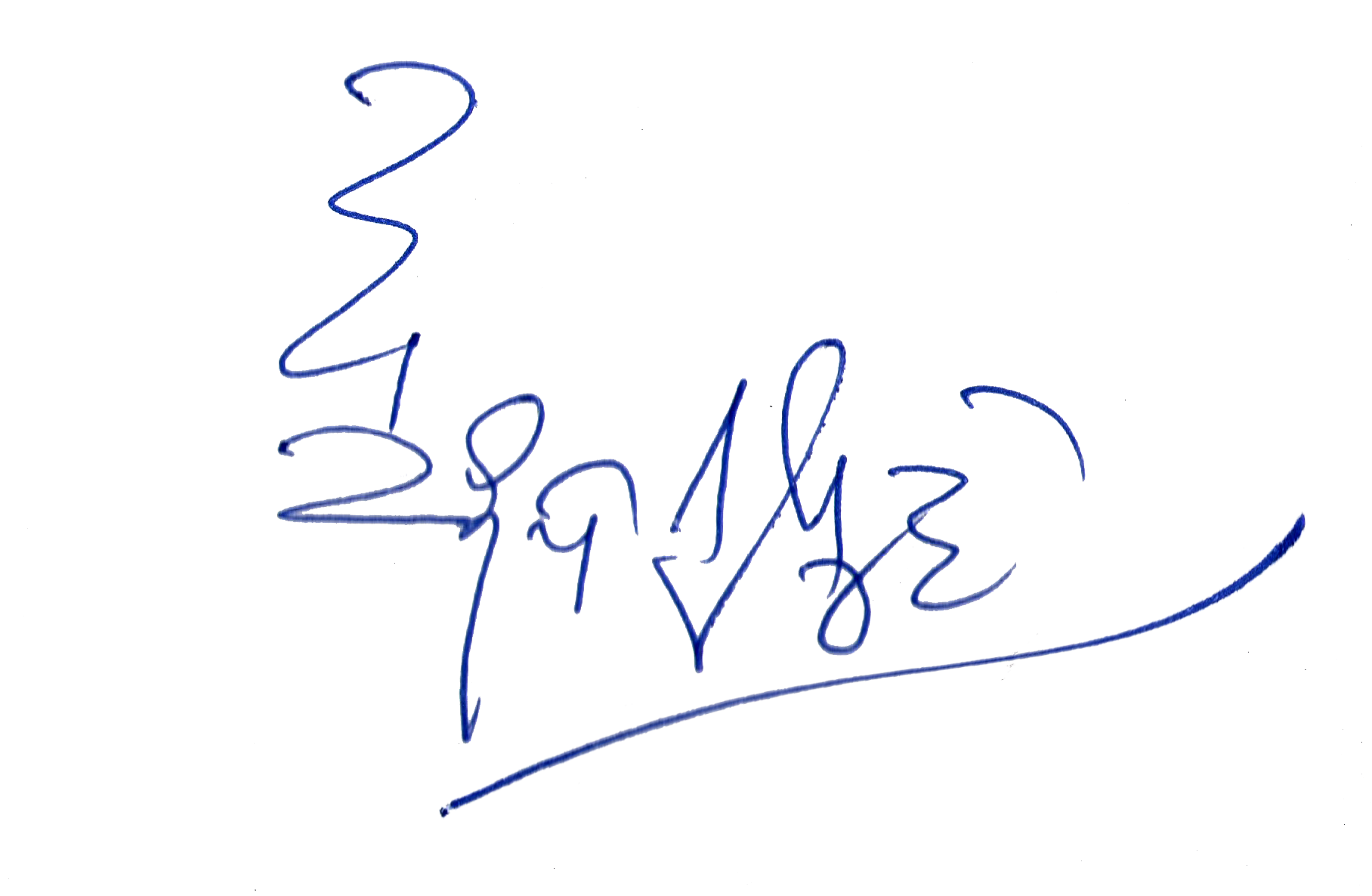

Arabinda Muduli (1 September 1961 – 1 March 2018) was an Indian Odia musician, singer and lyricist. Muduli was born in Khanati, Khordha District, Odisha, India. He was a disciple of Bhikari Bal. He was a devotee of lord Jagannath. He sang just bhajans and turned down offers to sing commercial movie songs.

== Death ==
Muduli died of cardiac arrest in Bhubaneswar on 1 March 2018.

== Awards ==
- "Swar Srikshetra", at the lion gate of Jagannath temple, Puri by the Governor of Odisha.
- Certificate of appreciation, Mumbai Odia Mahasangh, 2013
