= Ramarao Patro =

Odissi Singer and Guru

Pt. Ramarao Patro ରାମାରାଓ ପାତ୍ର
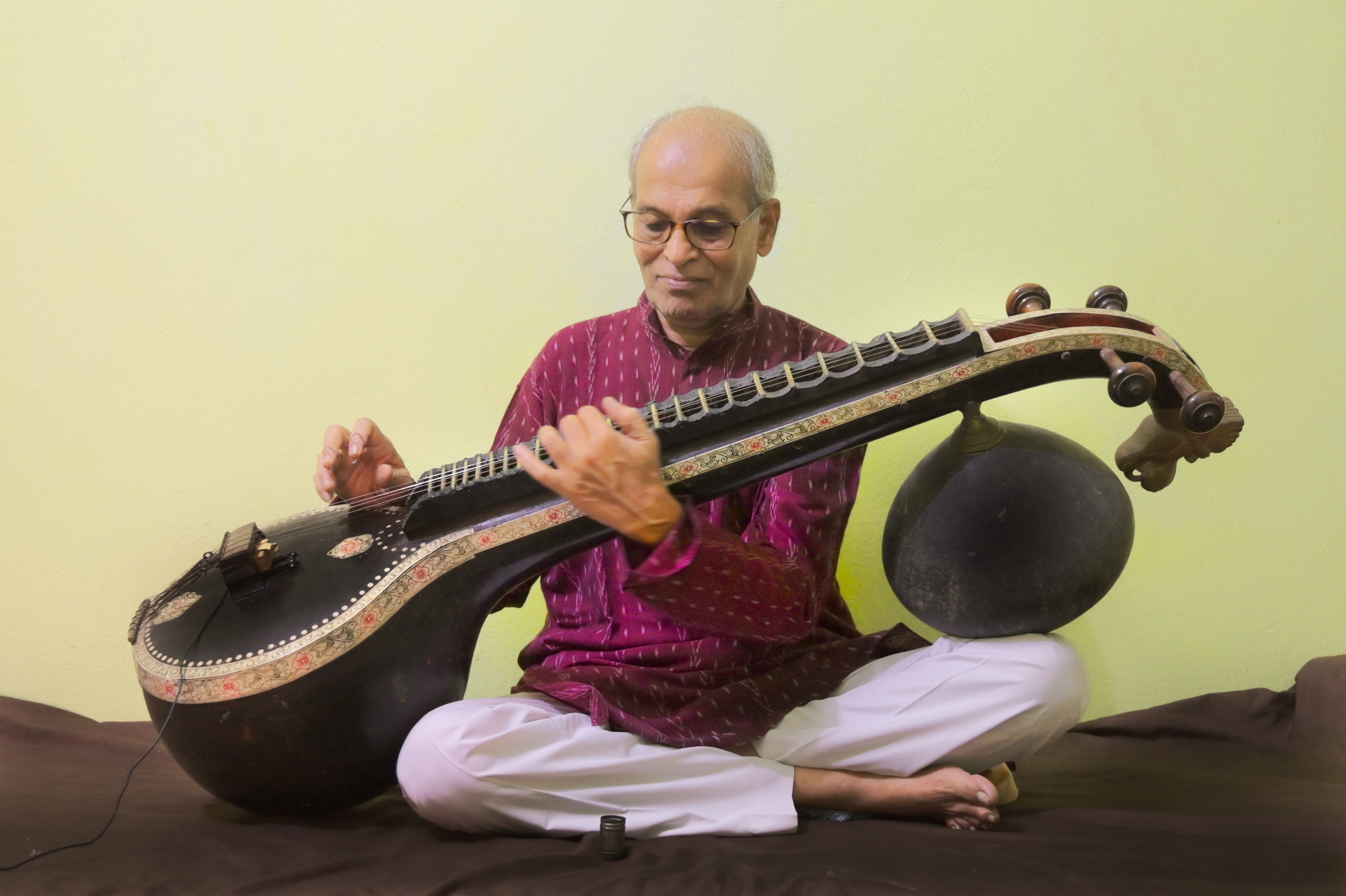

Background information
- Born: Ramarao Patro; 1947 (age 77–78); Kabisuryanagar, Ganjam, Odisha
- Origin: Kabisuryanagar
- Genres: Odissi music
- Occupation(s): Odissi music Guru, vocalist, Odissi Binākāra, composer
- Instrument: Odissi Bina

Pandit Ramarao Patro (Odia: ରାମାରାଓ ପାତ୍ର, romanized: Rāmarao Pātra; born 1947) is an Odissi music Guru, Odissi Bina exponent or Bīṇākara (also spelled Veena), noted composer & vocalist. He has composed music for hundreds of Odissi dance items and has worked closely with the founding Gurus of Odissi dance including Guru Pankaj Charan Das, Guru Deba Prasad Das & Guru Kelucharan Mahapatra. He has widely performed Odissi Bina recitals across the state. He presently teaches Odissi Veena to students at Guru Ramhari Das' Odissi Gurukul at Biragobindapur, Puri, Odisha. Patro is the very last Guru and artiste of the Odissi Veena. Patro started his initial training at the age of six in the Gandhiji Sangita Kalamandira established by Acharya Tarini Charan Patra in his hometown. He initially trained under Guru Bauribandhu Das and Guru Krusna Chandra Brahma. He then learned vocal Odissi music and the intricacies of the Bina in the Odissi style of music from Tarini Charan Patra himself. He later joined the Utkal Sangeet Mahavidyalaya as a student and continued his musical education there. He is the author of a voluminous book Odissi Sangita Baridhi (co-authored with disciple Prateek Pattanaik) documenting details of 60 Odissi ragas and 140 traditional Odissi compositions as taught by Guru Tarini Charan Patra. For his contributions to preserving the Bina, he has received the Odisha Sangeet Natak Akademi award in 2008.

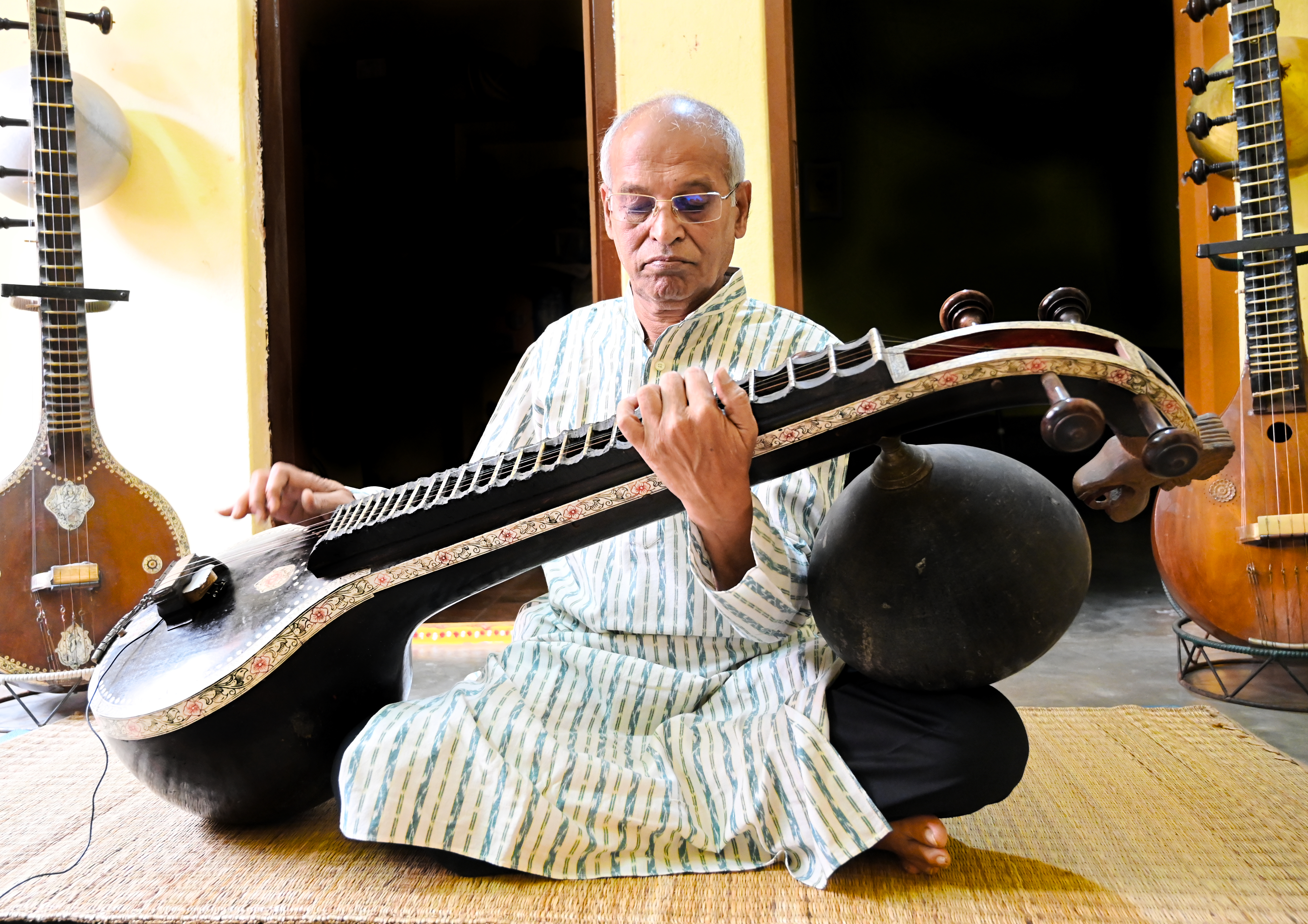
Pt Ramarao Patro
