= Subodh Patnaik (theatre director) =

- Born: 1 February 1964 (age 62); Puri, Odisha
- Education: Utkal Sangeet Mahavidyalaya
- Occupations: Theatre director, Playwright
- Years active: 1986-present
- Known for: Indian Folk Drama
- Spouse: Mamata Pradhan
- Website: Official website

Subodh Patnaik (Odia: ସୁବୋଧ ପଟନାଏକ) is an Indian theatre director and playwright from Odisha. He is the founder of Bhubaneswar-based theatre group Natya Chetana and theatre village 'Natya Grama' .Patnaik is the only theatre personality from Odisha to tour all the continents.

== Early life ==
Born in Puri in 1964, to veterinary Dr Pramod Chandra Patnaik and Dr Sashi Prava Patnaik. He was graduated from the Utkal Sangeet Mahavidyalaya in Odisha. He had a knowledge about street theatre, so he had gone New Delhi to learn prior to 1986. After return from New Delhi, he formed the theatre group Natya Chetana on 10 November 1986. Most of his Play based on social awareness.

== Career ==
He has formed Natya Chetana, a theatre group consisting of total of 25 artists of which 18 are men and 7 women. A theatre village is also established by this 25-year old group called Natya Garma. His play "Sindhi" was premiered on 9 June 2016 in Kalikasthan, Achham at Nepal. "Ramleela" a mythological play inspired by Ramayana performed with his group at Bhanja Kala mandap, Bhubaneswar.

== International tour ==
Patnaik took part in an international street theatre festival in Belgium. The same year, he went with his troupe to attend the 8th World Theatre Congress held at Paris, France. He has been participating the congress since 1995 is organised by the International Drama, Theatre and Education Association. Previous sessions of the congress were held in Australia, Kenya, Norway, Canada, Hong Kong and Brazil.

== Accolades ==
- Patnaik received Rishikesh Chattopadhya Smruti Samman by theatre group named Gobardanga Rupantar, West Bengal.

== Playography ==
Year	Title	Stage	Source
2015	Abu	Purvottar National Theatre Festival	
2016	Nian (The Fire)	Annapurna Rangamancha(Puri) and Nalco Auditorium (Bhubaneswar)	
