= Srikant Gautam =

Indian lyricist, actor

- Occupation: Actor
- Website: www.sunmusicindia.com

Srikant Gautam is a popular Indian song lyricist and director who works in the Odia film industry. After penning the lyrics for many popular songs, Srikant made his debut as a director with Mitha Mitha (2017).

== Filmography ==
Music:

- 2017 Mitha Mitha (lyricist)
- 2015 Raghupati Raghaba Rajaram (lyricist)
- 2014 One Way Traffic (lyricist)
- 2014 Golapi Golapi (lyricist)
- 2014 Akhire Akhire (lyricist)
- 2013 Paribeni Kehi Alaga Kari (lyricist)
- 2012 Raja Jhia Sathe Heigala Bhaba (lyricist)
- 2010 Aakhi Palakare Tu (lyricist)
- 2009 Pagala Karichi Paunji Tora (lyricist)
- 2006 Rakhi Bandhili Mo Rakhiba Mana (lyricist)
- 2002 Rahichi Rahibi Tori Paain (lyricist)
- 2000 Bou (lyricist)
- 1998 Santana (lyricist)
- 1995 Rakata Kahiba Kie Kahara (lyricist)
- 1994 Sakhi Rahila Ae Singha Duara (lyricist)

Actor:

- 2017 Mitha Mitha ( Rama Hari Dash )
- 2014 One Way Traffic Commissioner Abhinabh Sharma
- 1999 Ei Akhi Ama Sakhi
- 1997 Bapa
- 1994 Aemiti Bhai Jagate Nahin
- 1994 Pacheri Uthila Majhi Duaru Prakash Sahu
- 1993 Pathara Khasuchi Bada Deulu
- 1989 Jaa Devi Sarva Bhuteshu
- 1989 Panchu Pandav
- 1986 Bagula Baguli
- 1984 Dora
- 1979 Mathura Bijaya Krushna

Writer:

- 2017 Mitha Mitha (dialogue / story)
- Raghupati Raghaba Rajaram (dialogue)
- 2014 One Way Traffic (dialogue / story)
- 2014 Pagala Karichu Tu (dialogue)
- 2014 Lekhu Lekhu Lekhi Deli (dialogue)
- 2014 Golapi Golapi (dialogue)
- 2014 Akhire Akhire (dialogue by)
