= Kalicharan Pattnaik =

Indian author (1898–1978)

Kabichandra Kalicharan Pattnaik
- କାଳୀଚରଣ ପଟ୍ଟନାୟକ
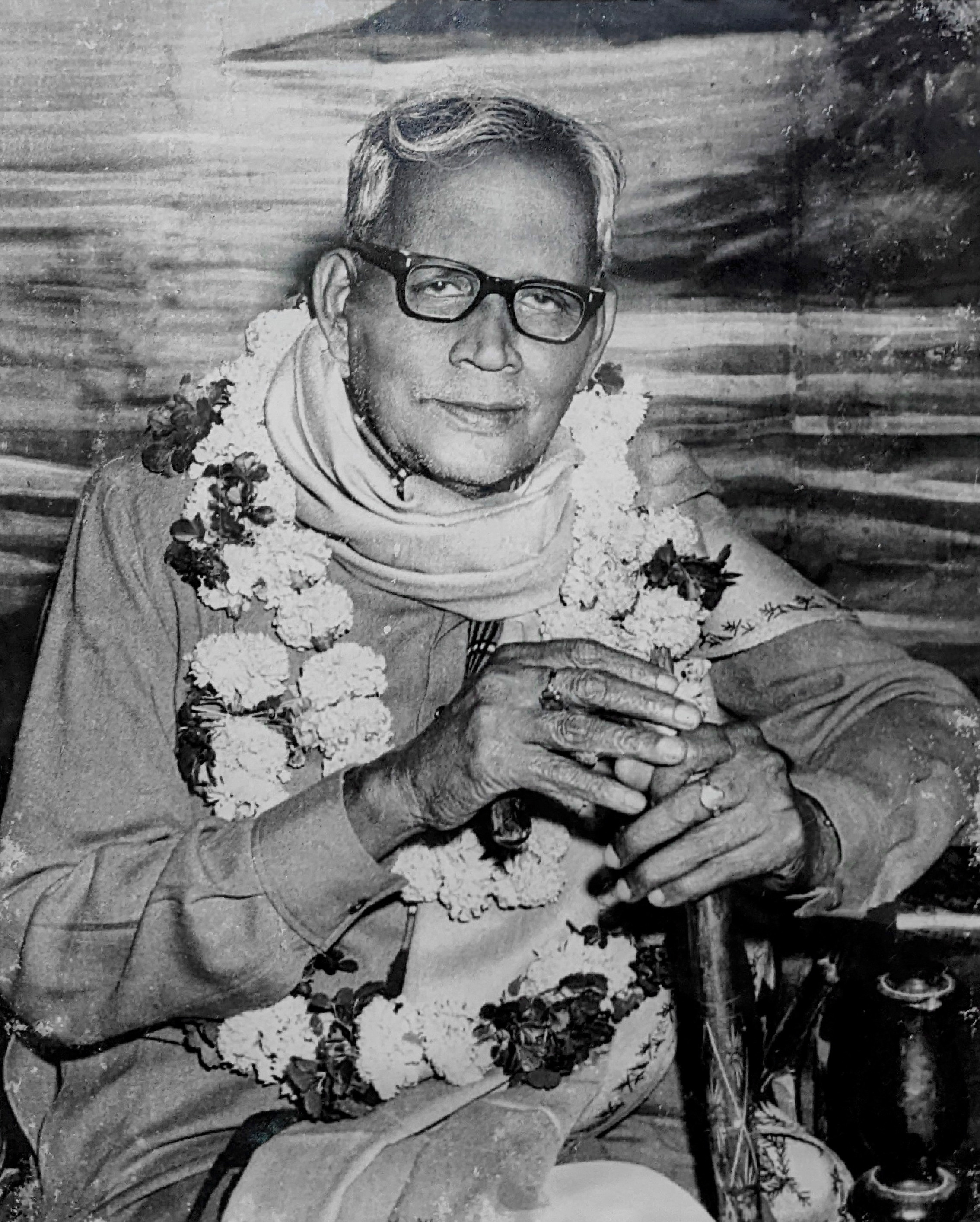
- Born: 23 December 1898; Baramba
- Died: 24 July 1978 (aged 79)
- Education: Ravenshaw College
- Parent: Durga Charan Pattnaik
- Relatives: Shyamamani Devi (niece)
- Writing career
- Genre: Odissi music
- Notable works: Kabichandra Gitabali, Bhata, Kumbhara Chaka
- Notable awards: Kendra Sahitya Akademi(1977)

Signature
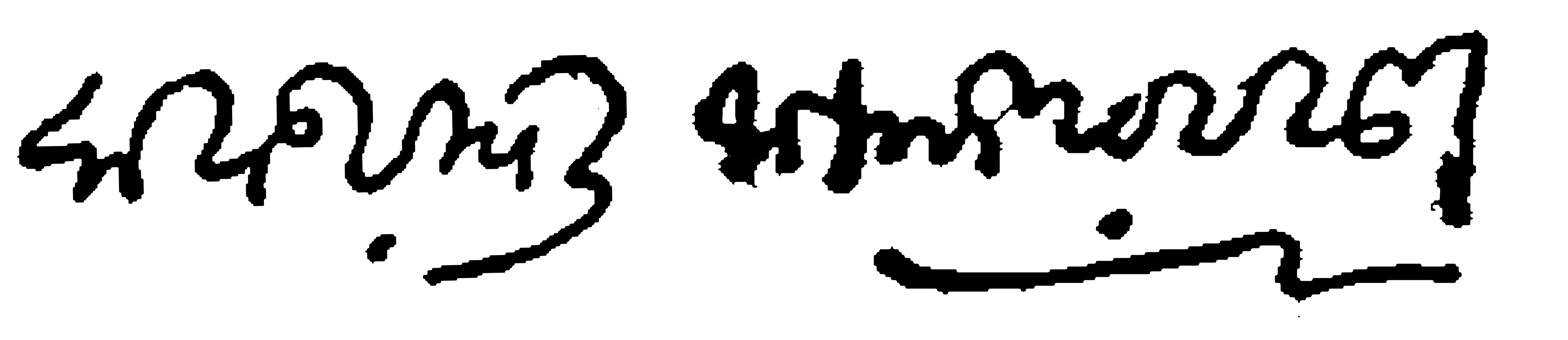

Kalicharan Pattnaik (23 December 1898 – 24 July 1978), also known by his sobriquet Kabichandra, was an eminent literary and artistic figure of Odisha. He had contributions in the field of Odissi music, Odissi dance and Odia theatre. He had significant contributions to development early Odia cinema as well. His compositions in various traditional ragas are widely sung in the field of Odissi music and dance.

== Early life ==
Kalicharan Pattnaik was born on 23 December 1898 in the then princely state of Badamba. He got his early education from Charchika school of Banki. After his education in Banki, he got into Khurda High School and after matriculation for higher education he went to Ravenshaw College Cuttack, but untimely death of his father in 1919 put a stop to his further educational career. After his end of his forma education he took up a job as a Sub-inspector of Schools at Khandapara, Ganjam.

== Career ==
Kalicharan had a keen interest in drama during his school days. He produced a play Babaji and with the help of his school friends. It was inspired from another play Kanchi Kaveri by Ramashankar Ray. In his childhood, he trained in Odissi classical music from legends such as Pt Basudeb Mahapatra and Khanu Mian. Later he learned under Madhava Rao while in College. He came to Cuttack after serving as Sub-inspector of Schools at Khandapara for few years. After the death of Sudam Charan Nayak he was involved with Odia newspaper Utkala Dipika. He was also the Assistant editor of 'Mukura' of Brajasundar Das.

In the year 1922 he left Utkala Dipika and Mukura and went to Mayurbhanj. There he became a dramatist. A drama group was founded in Mayurbhanj under his guidance. Kalicharan became very much interested in the traditional Chhau dance of Mayurbhanj. He introduced several new features in it from the Odisha's classical dance style Odissi. After his marriage he came to Puri and became a royal Odissi musician and advisor of Puri Raja Gajapati Ramachandra Deba. During his stay at Puri he edited a weekly, Puribasi. By his efforts in Puri Sangita Prabha was published for the first time as a monthly musical magazine. He was honoured by the Gajapati as Kabichandra for his musical compositions. In 1925 during his stay in Puri he started a Rasa Lila to introduce new energy to Odishi music and plays. From 1926 to 1939 his version of Rasa Lila gained wide popularity statewide for the performances in the famous cultural events like Utkala Sahitya Samaj and others. Thereafter he focused his attention towards social and historical plays. His first famous social play titled Pratisodha was staged in 1937. By 1939 he had published numerous compositions on Rasalila and plays, several devotional songs and children literature. From 1939 to 1950 a theatre group named as New Odisha Theatre became famous under his stewardship.

== Works ==
In Odia literature Drama was mostly focussed on some restrictive categories such as mythology. Kalicharan broke this restriction with his dramas with socially relevant topics.

Some of his major published works are as per below.

=== Dance Drama ===
1. Kalanka Bhanjana (କଳଙ୍କ ଭଞ୍ଜନ)
2. Daridrya Bhanjana (ଦାରିଦ୍ର୍ୟ ଭଞ୍ଜନ)
3. Milana Madhuri (ମିଳନ ମାଧୁରୀ)
4. Shree Radha(ଶ୍ରୀ ରାଧା)
5. Banshurira Bilapa(ବାଂସୁରୀର ବିଳାପ)
6. Shree Geeta Gobinda(ଶ୍ରୀ ଗୀତ ଗୋବିନ୍ଦ)
7. Preeti Sudhakara(ପ୍ରୀତି ସୁଧାକର)
8. Laxmi(ଲକ୍ଷ୍ମୀ)
9. Koutuka Chintamani(କୌତୁକ ଚିନ୍ତାମଣୀ)
10. Kishore Chandrananda Champu(କିଶୋର ଚନ୍ଦ୍ରାନନ୍ଦ ଚମ୍ପୂ)
11. Manini(ମାନିନୀ)
12. Akhira Dekha(ଆଖିର ଦେଖା)
13. Dehi Padapallaba mudaram(ଦେହି ପଦପଲ୍ଲବ ମୁଦାରଂ)

=== Mythologacal Drama ===
1. Dhrub(ଧ୍ରୁବ)
2. Mrigaya(ମୃଗୟା)
3. Bana Bihara(ବନ ବିହାର)
4. Bidyabali(ବିଦ୍ୟାବଳୀ)
5. Shakuntala(ଶକୁନ୍ତଳା)
6. Harischandta(ହରିଶ୍ଚନ୍ଦ୍ର)
7. Chakri(ଚକ୍ରୀ)
8. Dashabhuja(ଦଶଭୂଜା)

=== Historical Drama ===
1. Abhijana(ଅଭିଯାନ)
2. Malati(ମାଳତୀ)
3. Rakta Mandara(ରକ୍ତ ମନ୍ଦାର)

=== Edited works ===
1. Sangita Narayana of Kabiratna Purusottama Misra, Gajapati Sarbagya Jagannatha Narayana Deva (ସଙ୍ଗୀତ ନାରାୟଣ)
2. Kabisurjya Gitabali of Kabisurjya Baladeba Ratha (କବିସୂର୍ଯ୍ୟ ଗୀତାବଳୀ)
