= Sobala =

Sobala is a last name of Polish origin. Notable people with this last name include:

- Marcin Sobala (born 1972), Polish fencer
- Szymon Sobala (1919–2009), Polish gymnast
- Wojciech Sobala (born 1988), Polish volleyball player
