= Bhubaneswari Mishra =

Indian singer (1950–2016)

Bhubaneswari Mishra ଭୁବନେଶ୍ୱରୀ ମିଶ୍ର
- Born: Bhubaneswari Mishra; 25 January 1950; Odisha, India
- Died: 19 February 2016 (aged 66) New Delhi, India
- Genres: Odissi music
- Occupation: Odissi music singer

Bhubaneswari Mishra (25 January 1950 — 19 February 2016) was an Odissi classical singer and playback singer. She was a disciple of Adiguru Singhari Shyamsundar Kar. She was married to Dr. Jagamohan Misra, who was a popular physician and poet of Puri town. Her daughter Kasturika Mishra is also a trained classical vocalist.

She began her career singing Tiki Mora Naa for the film Krushna Sudama. She contributed several playback songs for films, including Itikili Mitikili in the film Sakhi Gopinath, Jahna Ra Sindura Gaara in Belabhumi, and Dayamayee Mahamayee Maa Mangala in Jay Maa Mangala.

Mishra was awarded the Odisha State Film Award for best female singer in 1979 and 1980 for the films Srikrushna Rasalila and Jay Maa Mangala respectively.

The Chief Minister of Odisha, Naveen Patnaik, described her as a "very talented artist” and her death as "a great loss in the field of music and culture."

A photograph of Mishra is displayed in the new film gallery of the Bhubaneswar State Museum, opened in May 2018, along with other notable playback singers such as Prafulla Kar and Sikander Alam.

Mishra died on 19 February 2016 in New Delhi following a cardiac arrest.
