= Utkal University of Culture =

Public cultural university in Bhubaneswar, Odisha, India

- Motto: सा प्रथमा संस्कृति र्बिश्वबारा (Sanskrit)
- Type: Public
- Established: 9 June 1999
- Affiliations: UGC; AIU
- Chancellor: Governor of Odisha
- Vice-Chancellor: Prasan Kumar Swain
- Location: Madanpur, Bhubaneswar, Odisha, 752054, India; 20°16′00″N 85°49′59″E
- Campus: 45 acres (18 ha); Urban
- Nickname: Sanskruti Vihar
- Website: uuc.ac.in

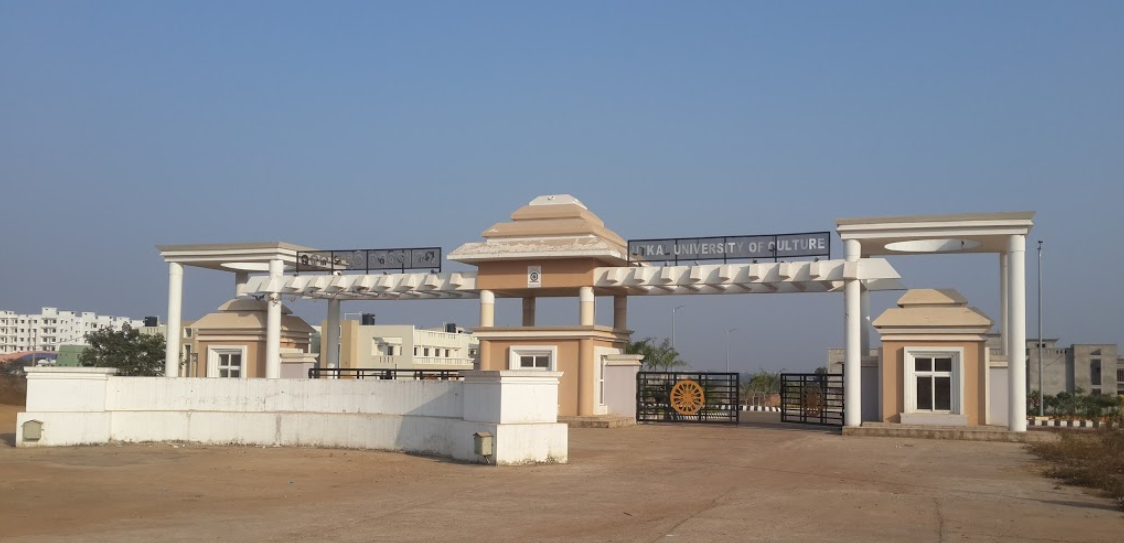

Utkal University of Culture is a public university in Bhubaneswar, Odisha dedicated for research, teaching and education in the field of culture.

== History ==
Utkal University of Culture was established by an ordinance on 9 June 1999, which was later replaced by Utkal University of Culture Act 1999. It was established as a teaching-cum-affiliating university to preserve, promote, propagate and protect the richness of Odisha's cultural values.

== Academics ==
The university offers Postgraduate education, Master of Philosophy, and Doctor of Philosophy courses in following sections.

- Faculty of Culture Studies
- Faculty of Architecture and Archaeology
- Faculty of Language and Literature
- Faculty of Visual Arts
- Faculty of Performing Art
- Certificate Courses (Jaina & Tamil)

== Affiliated Institutes ==
The university give affiliation to various Art and Craft, Hotel Management institutes in the state of Odisha. Some prominent institutes among them are Utkal Sangeet Mahavidyalaya, B.K. College of Art and Craft, Odissi Research Centre of Bhubaneswar and Govt. College of Art and Craft of Khallikote.

== Accreditation ==
It is accredited by the premier University Grants Commission (India). It has also been accredited by Association of Indian Universities.
