= Balakrushna Dash =

Sangita Sudhakara Balakrushna Dash ବାଳକୃଷ୍ଣ ଦାଶ
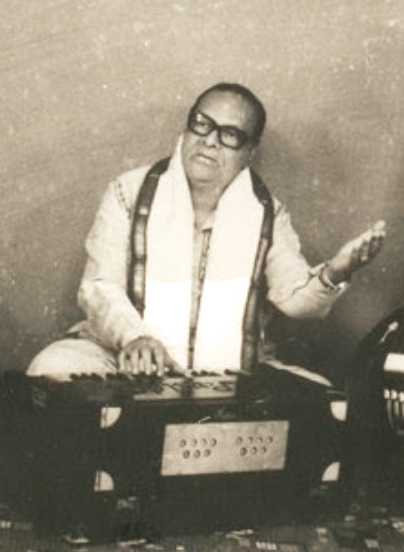

Background information
- Born: Balakrushna Dash
- Genres: Odissi music
- Occupations: Odissi music Guru, singer, composer, music director

Balakrushna Dash (Odia: ବାଳକୃଷ୍ଣ ଦାଶ, romanized: Bāḷakruṣṇa Dāsa) (May 15, 1923 - November 12, 1993) was a veteran Guru of Odissi music. One of the chief disciples of the legend Pt Gokul Chandra Srichandan of Kendrapada, Dash worked variously as a vocalist, composer and music director. He received the Odisha Sangeet Natak Akademi award in 1975-76 for Odissi Vocal. He was an Odissi classical music teacher in the GKCM Odissi Research Centre.

== Career ==
Balakrushna Dash started his music career as a singer of Odissi classical music (Odissi, Chhanda, Champu and other facets) at AIR, Calcutta in the year 1944. Later he started working as music director in films. His first film as a music director was Kedar Gouri in 1954. He directed music in 20 films viz. Amadabata, Abhinetri, Adinamegha, Mathura Vijay, Basanta Rasa and hundreds of non-film albums including Odissi, Drama, Theatre and music programs for the AIR, Cuttack.

Among his disciples are Shyamamani Devi and Ramhari Das.

== See also ==
- Odissi music
- Mardala
- Gita Govinda
- Gitaprakasa
