= Nrityantar =

Dance school in Bengaluru, India

Nrityantar Academy of Performing Arts
- Founded: 2009
- Founder: Madhulita Mohapatra
- Type: Dance academy
- Purpose: Odissi
- Location: OMBR Layout, Banaswadi, Bengaluru, India
- Region served: India
- Methods: Dance training, performance, outreach programs
- Key people: Madhulita Mohapatra (Artistic Director)

Nrityantar Academy of Performing Arts is an Odissi dance institute based in OMBR layout, Banaswadi, Bengaluru, founded by Odissi dancer Madhulita Mohapatra, who serves as its artistic director. The academy's dance troupe, the Nrityantar Dance Ensemble, conducts an annual event named Naman, (means salutation), which began in 2009 and has been held every year since then.

The 14th edition was held on 24 August 2025 at ADA Rangamandira, Bengaluru, India. The 15th edition, will premiere Dasavatara, choreographed by Madhulita Mohapatra, exploring Vishnu's ten incarnations, at ADA Rangamandira on 27 September 2026.

== History ==
The academy was first started at Bhubaneswar with four Odissi students. Mohapatra moved to Bengaluru and Odissi guru, Gangadhar Pradhan, inaugurated the Bangalore centre in October 2009. Later, four more branches were started in Bengaluru and by 2013 there were 140 students. By January 2015, the number increased to over 500 and six branches.

In 2024, Malaysian dancer Ramli Bin Ibrahim, a Padma Shri award recipient from Government of India in 2018 for arts, performed at Naman 2024 in Bengaluru. The 13th edition saw three dance troupes, including from Nrityantar, perform. Later, troupes from both the Sutra Dance Theatre from Malaysia, founded by dancer-choreographer Ibrahim and Devjani Sen's Bengaluru-based Odissi Dance Centre performed at ADA Rangamandira.

In 2023, 'Colours of Krishna' was premiered at the 12th edition also at ADA Rangamandira in 2023. in January 2023, the 11th edition of Naman 2022 was held at Rangamandira, Bengaluru.

In 2019, the 10 edition was held for three days. It was a two-days of dance programmes by students and senior artistes and a seminar on the third day. Nrityantar ensemble performed malhar pallavi and later, Mohapatra presented an ashtapadi ‘Ramathe Yamuna pulinavane’ after Akshithi Roy Chaudhury's mohana pallavi. On Day 2, three dance companies made their thematic presentations including Nrityantar's Mirza Sahiba, which was based on one of the five folk legends of Punjab.

In 2018, the two-day 9th edition was held on 12 and 13 August at Rangamandira, JC Road, Bengaluru in memory of Protima Bedi's death anniversary which fell on 18 August.

In September 2017, two six-year old dancers performed on the first day while the second day saw three solo performances by guru Aruna Mohanty of Bhubaneswar, Kolkata's Sharmila Biswas and Surupa Sen of Nrityagram, Bengaluru.

In August 2016, the 7th edition took place. Male dancer Niladri Mohanty presented sankarabharanam pallavi credited to Pankaj Charan Das.

In July 2011, the second edition was organised at Seva Sadan, Malleshwaram, Bangalore and was dedicated to the memory of Odissi guru Gangadhar Pradhan (1948–2010). Aruna Mohanty, a disciple of Pradhan, and by Rajashri Praharaj performed and young artiste Debasish Patnaik from Orissa (now Odisha) was also part of Naman 2011.

== Evolution of the dance form ==
The 2023 event saw Nrityantar present Odissi, in ways that appeal to contemporary audiences while retaining its classical integrity under the direction of Mohapatra. She said that while the core aesthetics must remain constant, thematic innovations and fresh choreographic interpretations help the form, connect the younger generation. The academy also helped increase the patronage for Odissi among youth and experienced practitioners in Karnataka, by blending traditional techniques with contemporary choreography.

== Free classes and outreach ==
Nrityantar teaches students from underprivileged communities in government schools twice a week. Mohapatra started free classes at the academy and in 2016, regular sessions were started in a few government schools in Bengaluru.
