= Madhulita Mohapatra =

Indian Odissi dancer

Madhulita Mohapatra (born 1978) is a dancer from India. She is an exponent of Indian classical dance, Odissi. She is also a Sambalpuri folk dancer for more than 20 years. She has been performing and teaching Odissi and Sambalpuri folk dance since the last 15 years. She started an Odissi school at Bengaluru in June 2008. She is also a performer, choreographer and trainer.

== Early life ==
Mohapatra is born in Bhawanipatna, Kalahandi district, Odisha. She did her post-graduation in Commerce and Business Administration. She learnt her basics from Guru Krushna Chandra Sahoo at Kalahandi Kala Kendra, Bhawanipatna before receiving her Nrutya Acharya from Odisha Dance Academy under the guidance of Padma Shri Gangadhar Pradhan, Padma Shri Aruna Mohanty and Pabitra Kumar Pradhan. She married Imaraan, an IT engineer. After marriage, with the support of her husband, she quit her job and moved to Bengaluru in 2008 and later, started a dance school, Nrityantar Academy of Performing Arts, to spread the Odissi dance culture in South India. She is a qualified cost accountant.

== Performances ==
She choreographed 'Colours of Krishna', the 12th edition of 'Naman', held at ADA Rangmandira in Bengaluru in September 2023. In March 2021, she performed at Jagriti Theatre in Bengaluru. In April 2020, she performed along with her students at the International Dance Day celebrations at Bhubaneshwar. In September 2019, SPIC Macay, North Kerala Chapter, featured her Odissi show at the Amritavidyalaya Institute campus. She regularly conducts SPIC-Macay classes in schools and colleges. In 2018, she performed in London along with her ward Gairika Mathur. In 2017, she performed Harirabhisarati on ashtapadi, Madhave ma kuru manini manam aye from Geeta Govinda at the sixth Kelucharan Guna Keertanam at Gyan Manch in Kolkata. For the sixth anniversary of Nrityantar, an annual dance festival, Naman was organised at the ADA Rangamandira, Bengaluru on 2 August 2016. In 2010, Odisha Dance Academy founder Guru Gangadhar Pradhan inaugurated Naman and since then it is being organised every year. One of her first shows was at the 1st Odissi International on 21 December 2010, where she was felicitated Guru Daksha Mushruwala from Mumbai. For the first time, she performed in Kerala in 2012 at the famous Guruvayoor Temple and now she regularly visits the southern state not only for shows but teaches in schools.

In October 2023, under her tutelage Nrityantar Dance Ensemble performed a free show title Eternal Enchantment... timeless charm of Odissi dance. The new show was performed at Bharatiya Vidya Bhavan, Mylapore, Chennai.

In December 2023, she choreographed and performed as part of the Nrityantar Dance Ensemble at the concluding day of the 11-day Swaralaya Soorya dance and music festival in Bengaluru.

She is an empanelled artiste of Indian Council for Cultural Relations (ICCR) and she is also a graded performer on Doordarshan.

== Fusion of Odissi and Manipuri dance forms ==
Mohapatra started performances featuring a fusion of Odissi and Manipuri dance forms after collaborating with popular Manipuri artiste Bimbavati Devi from Kolkata titled Odissi-Manipuri Jugalbandi in November 2023.

== Awards ==
- In July 2019, she was awarded the Sangeet Natak Academi's Ustad Bismillah Khan Yuva Puraskar for 2018 for Odissi dance.
- Kempegowda Award by Karnataka Government.
- She is the recipient of the IIDF 2017.
- She also received BCKA Yuva Kala Pratibha awards.
- The GTF Women's Excellence award.
