= Varad =

Varad may refer to:

- Oradea, city in Romania, also known as Várad
- Varad, Bardoli, village in Gujarat, India
- Varad or Warad, village in the Sindhudurg district of Maharashtra, India; ancestral village of Irish prime minister Leo Varadkar
  - Varadkar (surname), Indian toponymic surname from the village in Maharashtra
