= Nandita Behera =

Indian dancer

- Born: Nandita Pattnaik; 29 August 1957 (age 68) Bhubaneswar, Orissa, India
- Occupation: Odissi dancer and teacher
- Period: 20th century, 21st century

Website
- odissidancecircle.com

Nandita Behera (née Pattnaik) is an Odissi dance instructor and founder of Odissi Dance Circle in Cerritos, California. A student of Guru Kelucharan Mohapatra and Guru Gangadhar Pradhan, Nandita Behera has been teaching Odissi in California for the past twenty years. She was awarded Sringaramanai by Sur Singar Samsad Bombay and is also a recipient of the National Scholarship for Dance in India.

== Early life ==
Behera was born in Bhubaneswar, Odisha. She learnt basics from guru Kelucharan Mohapatra and guru Gangadhar Pradhan. Later, she settled in California and started a dance school where she trained many in Odissi dance form.

== Career ==
In December 2020, one of her students Prasanna Karthik, presented some verses from one of the greatest Tamil poets, Subramania Bharathi, in dance form. Behera has choreographed for her student, who presented them in the form of a video. Another American born Odishi dancer, Shibani Patnaik, also came under her tutelage and performed many shows in India from 2012. She also performed at the International Odissi Festival organised by Guru Kelucharan Mohapatra Odissi Research Centre in Bhubaneswar in December 2012. Many of her students have become renowned dancers. In April 1991, she performed at Long Beach.

== See also ==
- Dance in India
- Indian classical dance
