= Laxmipriya Mohapatra =

Indian classical dancer and actress (1928–2021)

Laxmipriya Mohapatra (born 1928 - died 20 March 2021) was an Indian classical dancer, performing Odissi dance on stage and in films. Along with her husband, Kelucharan Mohapatra, she is credited with reviving Odissi dance in India, in the 1940s and 50s.

== Career ==
Mohapatra was born in Khurda, Odisha, and was taught to dance by her mother, actress and dancer Tulasi Devi. At the age of seven, she began performing at the Annapurna Theatre in Puri, Odisha, and by the age of 17, was their star performer, drawing large crowds who attended her performances. She moved to Cuttack, where she met her husband, Kelucharan Mohapatra, a trained Odissi dancer who was at the time playing tabla, a classical form of percussion, as an accompaniment, for dance performances. In 1946, after training in Odissi with her husband, she performed the first solo Odissi dance on stage, which was considered a milestone in efforts to revive the classical dance form. She is also the first woman to perform the traditional form of Gotipua dance on stage. In addition to performing Odissi, she was trained in several traditional folk dance forms, and performed at Republic Day parades in India's capital, New Delhi, in the 1950s. She performed in a number of plays on stage, as well as in several Odia films, including Manika Jodi, Suryamukhi, Mala Jahna and Amadabata.

When her husband, Kelucharan, became a dancer and choreographer, she retired in 1985 from professional dancing to support him. Along with him, she established and taught at Srjan, a well-known classical dance school in Bhubaneswar, Odisha. Their son, Ratikant Mohapatra, is also an Odissi dancer and choreographer. She taught a number of modern Odissi dancers, including Minati Mishra, Priyambada Mohanty Hejmadi, and Kumkum Mohanty. She died on 20 March 2021, at the age of 86, and was buried with state honors. in September 2021, a five-day Odissi festival was dedicated to her memory, and included Odissi performances by many of her former students.
