= Sujata Mohapatra =

Indian classical Odissi dancer

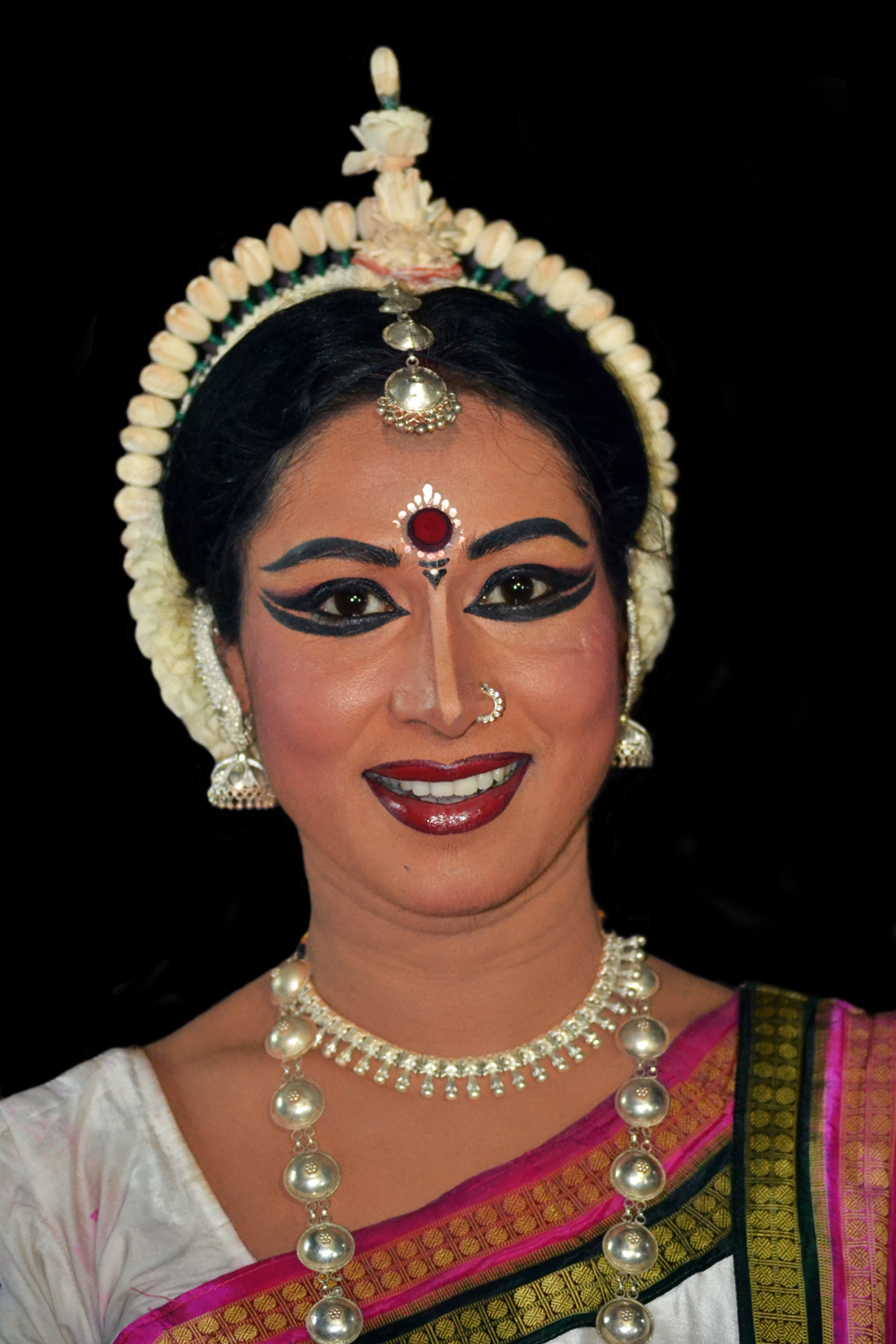
- Born: Sujata Mohanty; 27 June 1968 (age 58); Balasore, Odisha, India
- Occupations: Indian classical dancer, performer
- Website: Official website

Sujata Mohapatra (born 27 June 1968) is an Indian classical dancer and teacher of Odissi dancing style.

== Early life and background ==
Sujata Mohapatra was born in Balasore in Hindu Karan family. She started learning Odissi at an early age from Guru Sudhakar Sahu.

Sujata Mohapatra came to Bhubaneshwar, Odisha, in 1987 to further her training under Padma Vibhushan Guru Kelucharan Mohapatra at Odissi Research Center in Bhubaneshwar. She married Ratikant Mohapatra, son of Guru Kelucharan Mohapatra. Her daughter Preetisha Mohapatra is also an Odissi dancer.

== Career ==
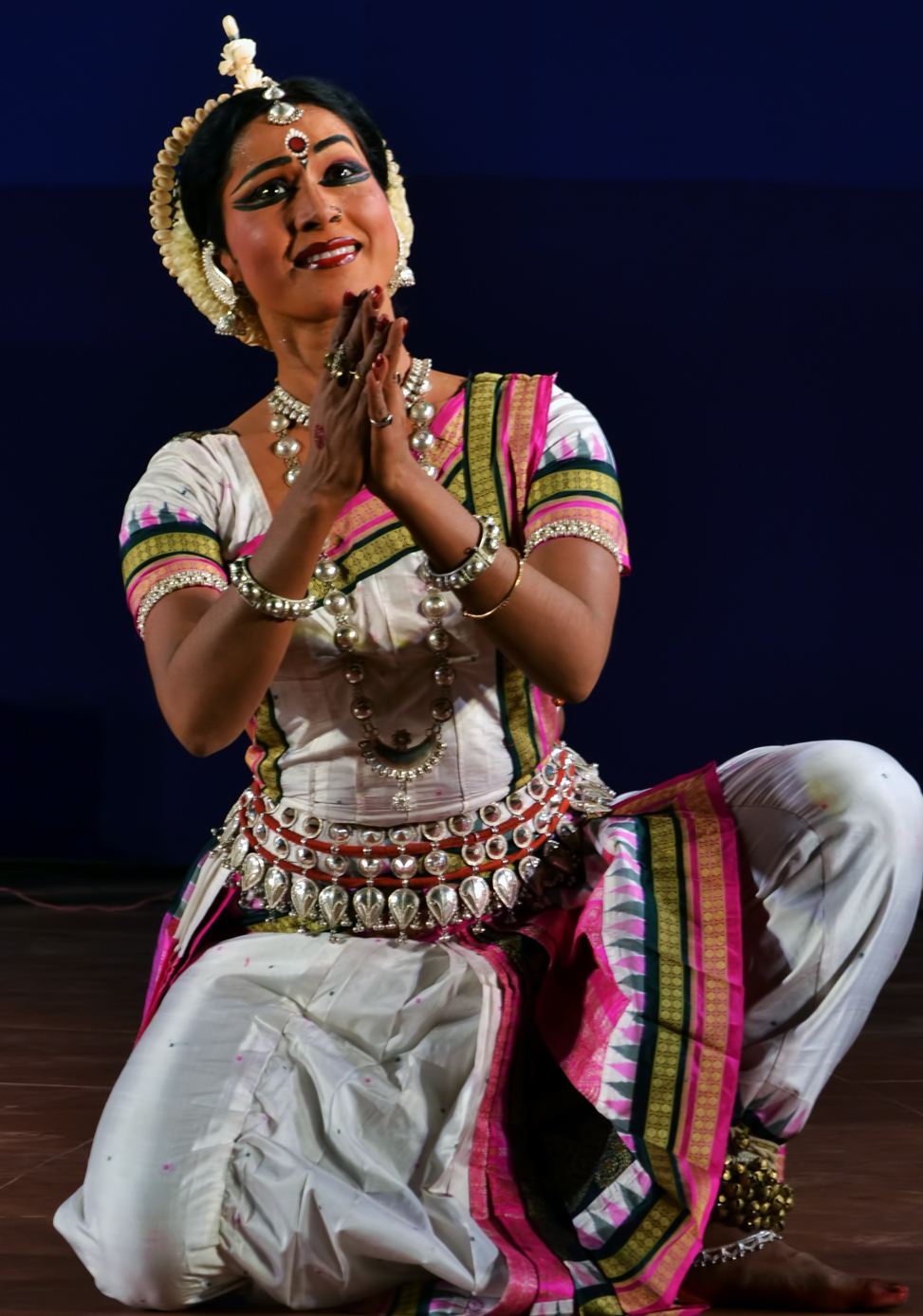
Sujata Mohapatra

Sujata Mohapatra started dancing Odissi classical and folk dance with Sahu's dance troupe in programs across Odisha. Under the tutelage of Kelucharan Mohapatra, her dance style evolved, and she was groomed to become one of the foremost Odissi dancers of her generation. Sujata Mohapatra performs in India, and other countries, as a soloist and a leading member of the Srjan Dance Troupe, founded by her father-in-law.

Sujata Mohapatra is actively involved in teaching Odissi. She is the Principal of 'Srjan' (Odissi Nrityabasa), a prime Odissi Dance Institution founded by MGuru Kelucharan Mohapatra She holds a master's degree in Oriya Literature from Utkal University, and has done research work at the Odissi Research Centre, Bhubaneshwar.

In July 2011, she opened an Odissi Institute - Guru Keerti Srjan, in her hometown, Balasore.

== Awards ==
- Sangeet Natak Akademi Award, in 2017
- Nritya Choodamani from Krishna Gana Sabha, Chennai, 2014
- Mahari Award, Pankaj Charan Odissi Research Foundation
- 2nd Sanjukta Panigrahi Award, Chitra Krishnamurthi from Washington D.C.
- Aditya Birla Kala Kiran Award, Mumbai
- Raaza Foundation Award, Delhi
- Hope of India, 2001
- Nritya Ragini, Puri, 2002
- Baisakhi Award
- Prana Natta Samman
- Abhi Nandika, Puri, 2004
- Bhimeswar Pratikha Samman, 2004
- Raaza Puruskar, 2008
- Top Grade Artist of Doordarshan Outstanding Category Artist in ICCR

== See also ==
- Indian women in dance
