= Aruna Mohanty =

Odissi dancer

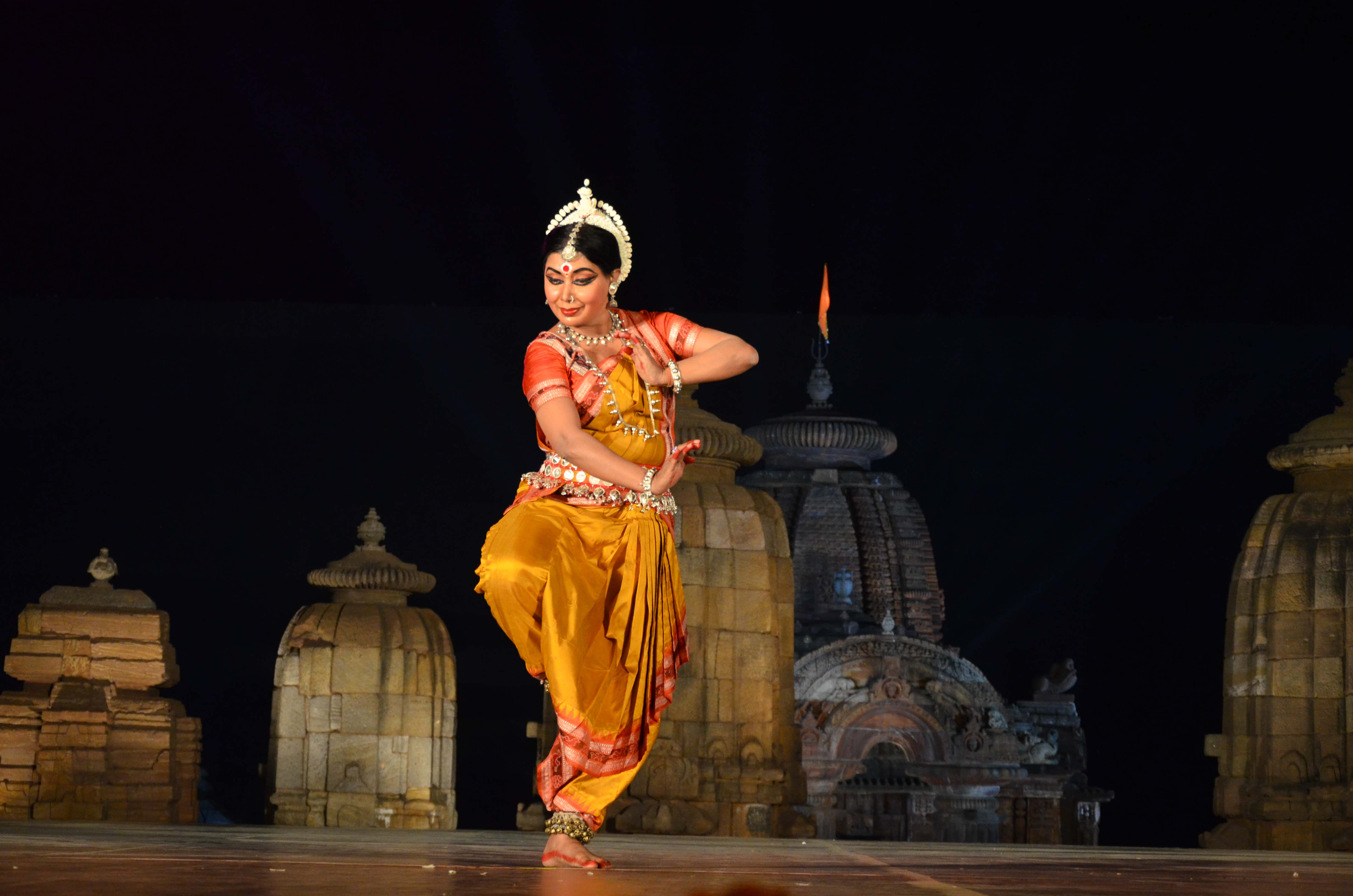
- Born: 4 April 1960 (age 65)
- Citizenship: India
- Years active: 1970-present
- Career
- Dances: Odissi

Aruna Mohanty (born 4 April 1960) is an Odissi dancer, choreographer and guru. She is currently the Secretary of the Orissa (Odisha) Dance Academy. She has received a number of awards for her work, including the Padmashree award.

== Training ==
Aruna Mohanty started her training in Odissi under Shrinath Rout and Gobinda Pal. In 1972 she started training under Gangadhar Pradhan. She has also received guidance in the dance form from Pankaj Charan Das, Kelucharan Mohapatra, Sanjukta Panigrahi and Sonal Mansingh.

She has also received training in Odissi music from Nirmal Mohanty and Shantanu Das.

== Career ==
Aruna Mohanty has nearly five decades of experience as a dancer and choreographer.

Her choreographed works include Srushti O Pralay depicting the super cyclone that hit Odisha in 1999, Sravana Kumar, Kharavela, Jatra Baramasi, Gatha Odissi, Pratinayak, Krishna Sharanam, several Ashtapadis from Jayadeva's Gita Govinda, and Siddhartha based on the novel of the same name by the German novelist Hermann Hesse.

She has used her art to examine contemporary and social issues; for example. in Naari, gender stereotypes and the status of women in society are explored through the lives and stories of several women in Indian literature and history, such as Sita, Draupadi, Mandodari and Nirbhaya.

She has conducted research on dance, focusing on topics such as the representation of the male dancer in classical sculpture and the evolution of Odissi in the post-Independence era.

She has been a visiting scholar at several universities in the United States of America, such as the University of California, University of South Carolina and Cornell University.

== Awards ==
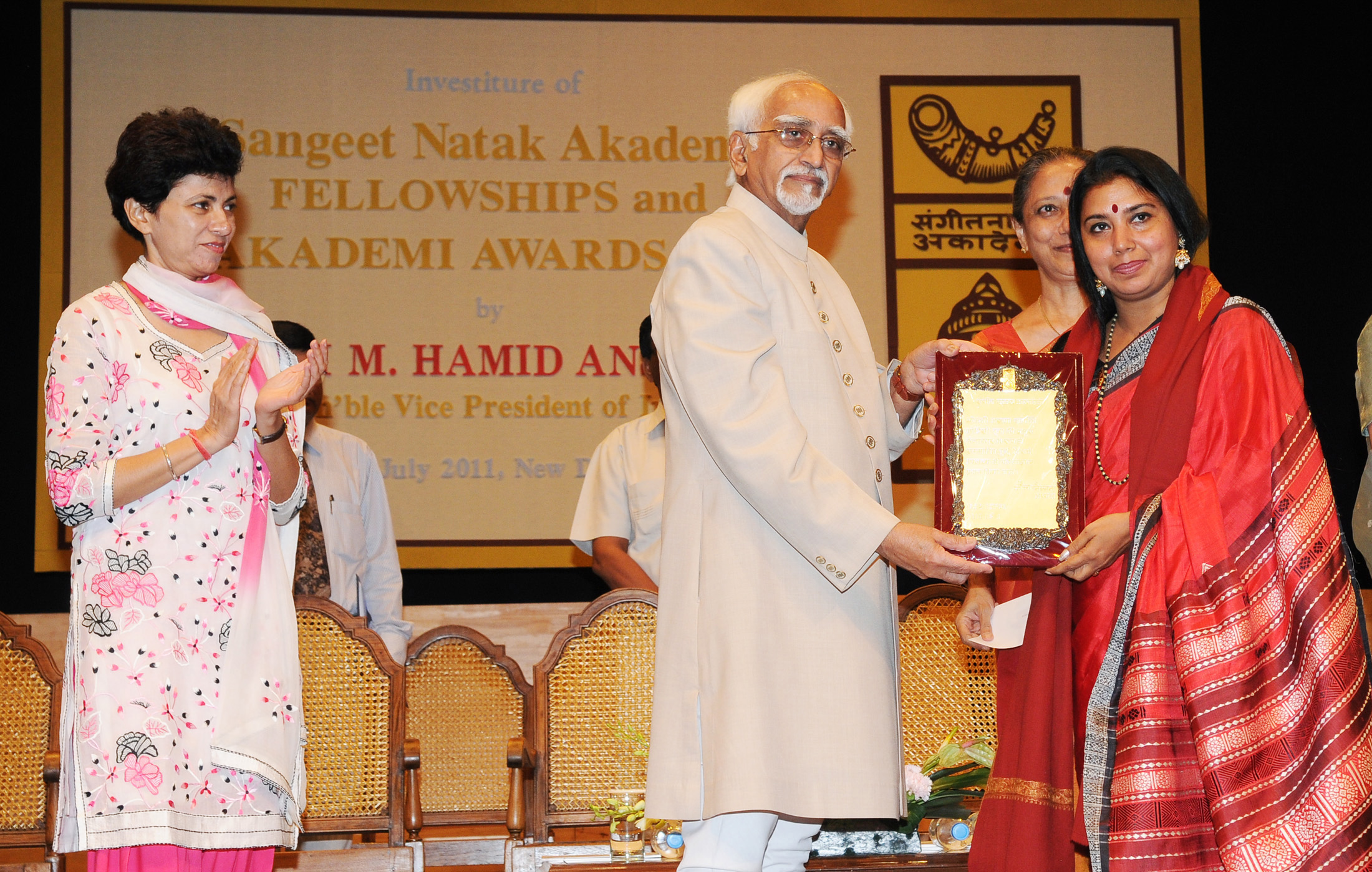
Mohd. Hamid Ansari presenting the Sangeet Natak Akademi Award-2010 to Smt. Aruna Mohanty, Bhubaneswar, for her outstanding contribution to Odissi

- Padmashree, Government of India, 2016-17
- State Sangeet Natak Akademi Award, Government of Odisha, 2014
- Central Sangeet Natak Akademi Award, Government of India, 2010
- Sanjukta Panigrahi Memorial National Award, 2001
- Mahari Award, Guru Pankaj Charan Research Foundation, 1997
- Bharat Bhavan Award, conferred on the recipient by the President of India
- Jagannath Sanskruti Bikash Parishad Award
