= Aditi Bhagwat =

Indian actress

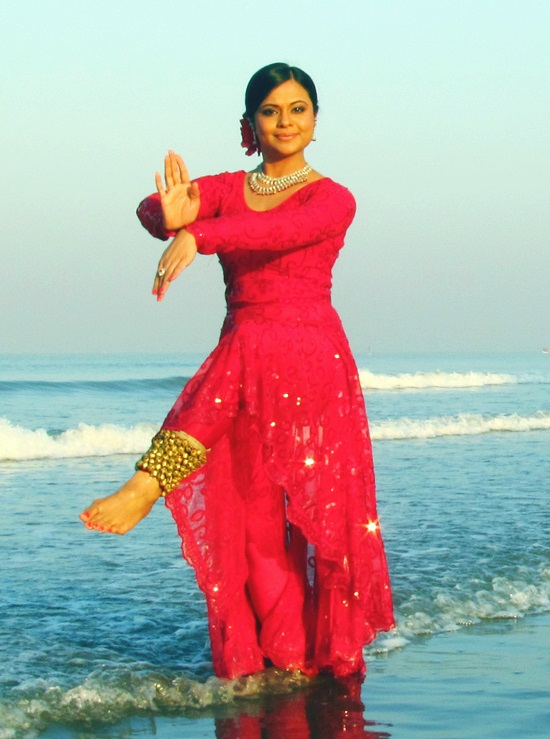
- Bhagwat in 2012
- Born: 18 January 1981 (age 45); Maharashtra, India
- Education: Gandharva Mahavidyalaya
- Occupations: Actor, Dancer, Choreographer
- Years active: 1993–present
- Website: http://www.aditibhagwat.com/

Aditi Bhagwat (born 18 January 1981) is an internationally renowned kathak and lavani expert, actress, dance tutor and choreographer. She travels all around the world participating in stage shows performing solo as well as in collaboration with many other Indian music artists.

== Early life and career highlights ==
Aditi's musical journey began very early in life, highly inspired by her mother, Ragini Bhagwat, a classical singer. Her initial kathak training in the Jaipur style, was under the guidance of Roshan Kumari and Nandita Puri. Her training in "Odissi" under the guidance of Jhelum Paranjape has led to her grooming in Abhinaya (expressions) and Adda - graceful posture for which Aditi is well recognized. She has a master's degree in dance from Gandharva Mahavidyalaya (National School of Dance).

While staying within the structure of Indian classical music and art, Aditi has vastly experimented and succeed in mixing traditional dance art and music with Jazz and other kinds of western music. She was involved in the kathak and Electronic music collaboration with the band Kartik and Gotam: Business Class Refugees in France. She was also involved with the Issue Project with New York pianist Rod Williams. She has gracefully blended the stylized gestures of kathak and the sophisticated rhythm of the Tatkaar, Chakkradhars and different Taals with varying time cycles with instruments like the djembe, drums, ghumbri, cuatro, sarod, sitar and many more. Bhagwat has said that change and experimentation help a person grow as an artist. Her kathak dance style shows a "mastery of the idiom" according to The Hindu.

Aditi was awarded the prestigious United States Department of State Fellowship under Cultural Exchange Program 'One Beat' in 2012.

She has featuring a column in Mi Marathi Live E-paper on various facets of dance. The first of article of the series featured on 13 September 2015, and will continue as a weekly feature.

== Filmography ==
Aditi has appeared in lead role as well as special appearance in a few Indian movies

1. Traffic Signal (Hindi Movie, 2007, Special Appearance)
2. Chalu Navra Bholi Baiko (Marathi Movie, 2008)
3. Adla Badli (Marathi Movie, 2008)
4. Manya Sajjana (Marathi Movie, 2008)
5. Tahan (Marathi Movie, 2008)
6. Sumbaran (Marathi Movie, 2009)
7. Myoho (Hindi Movie, 2012, Special Appearance)
8. Shasan (Marathi Movie, 2016)
9. Aarsa (International Short, 2016)
10. ‘’ Kahani ghar ghar kii ‘’ [ashlesha ] Hindi serial 2003
