= Jhelum Paranjape =

Indian classical dancer

- Born: 24 September 1954 (age 71); Mumbai, India
- Occupations: Indian classical dancer, choreographer
- Awards: Kumar Gandharva Award; Sanjukta Panigrahi Award

Jhelum Paranjape (born September 24, 1954) is an Indian classical dancer. and exponent of Indian classical Odissi dance. She founded Smitalay, a dance academy located in Mumbai, India. Paranjape is known for her contributions to the field of classical dance, Odissi, a classical dance form of Odisha.

== Early life ==
Paranjape did M.Sc. in Statistics, then she became a Mathematics Professor while pursuing her Odissi dance work. Later, she founded the Smitalay dance institute in Mumbai, where she choreographed Odissi productions and trained Aditi Bhagwat. She contributed to preserving and promoting Odissi's traditions.

Smita Patil introduced her to Guru Kelucharan Mohapatra, who died in 1986, in her memory she started Smitalay in 1989.

== Awards ==
- Kumar Gandharva Award for choreography in Odissi.
- Sanjukta Panigrahi Award in the field of Odissi dance.
