= Sharmila Biswas =

Indian odissi dancer and choreographer

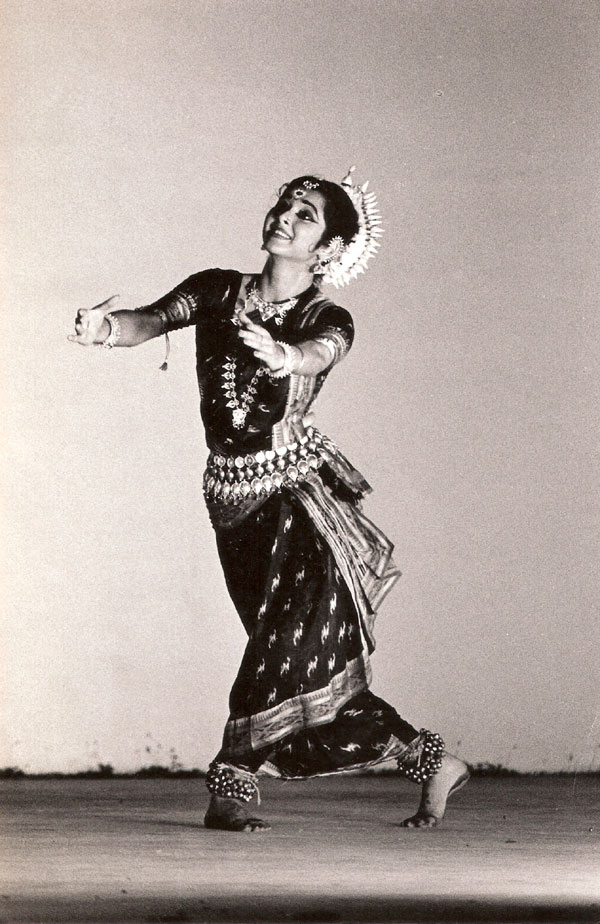
- Sharmila Biswas in 2009
- Born: 19 November 1962 (age 63); Kolkata, India
- Occupations: Classical dancer, choreographer,
- Years active: 1980 - present
- Dancing career
- Current group: Odissi Vision & Movement Centre (1994)
- Dances: Odissi
- Website: sharmilabiswas.com/home.html

Sharmila Biswas (November 19, 1962) is a leading dancer, choreographer and teacher in the field of Indian Classical Dance form, Odissi. She is recognised for her contribution to Odissi Classical Dance which brought many changes in the content, technique and costumes. Tracing the many facades of Traditional Performing and Visual arts of Odisha, and in that context, viewing Odissi Dance have been the foundation of most of her Dance productions. A prominent desciple of Guru Kelucharan Mohapatra, a Sangeet Natak Akademi awardee (2012), Sharmila Biswas heads Odissi Vision & Movement Centre (1994), a well-known institution dedicated to research, training and productions. Graded as an ‘Outstanding’ artist by The Indian Council of Cultural Relations, Ministry of External Affairs, Government of India. Graded as one of the ‘Top’ artists by Doordarshan, India. In 2012, Biswas was awarded Sangeet Natak Akademi Award, conferred by the Sangeet Natak Akademi, India's National Academy for Music, Dance and Drama.

== Early life and education ==
Biswas began dance training at the age of 7, at CLT, Kolkata, where children were trained by professionals including Balakrishna Menon, Guru Bipin Singh, and Kalavati Devi. Along with dance, she gained an understanding of light, sound, and costume design, as well as stage craft, arts and crafts, music, theatre, and skating.

Gathering performance experience and touring for shows were integral parts of the curriculum of CLT, a brainchild of Samar Chatterjee. The dance itself included basic training in most of the classical dance forms and folk forms of India. This curriculum helped Biswas to choose dance as her profession and Odishi as her style at the age of sixteen. She chose anthropology for her graduation, to help her understand the creative expressions of people.

Biswas had her initial training with Guru Muralidhar Majhi. Her full training in Odishi was under Guru Kelucharan Mohapatra. Biswas studied Abhinaya under Guru Kalanidhi Narayan. She was invited for the Young Choreographers’ Workshop by the American Dance Festival in New York in 1991. The two-month long workshop was conducted by renowned choreographers from different countries, and gave her exposure to the world of international choreography.

== Career ==
Started her career as a member of her Guru’s presentations. Toured Russia and Germany in prominent roles, and participated as the lead dancer in a number of his dance productions. Her solo career began in 1986 when she was selected to perform at the Youth Festival in Delhi by the Central Sangeet Natak Akademi and ICCR. This performance brought her instant recognition by the Critics and audience.

She Founded Odissi Vision & Movement Centre in 1994, now one of the Prime Cultural Institutions of India, for Training and Productions based on Research. Since then, has been performing and choreographing for the past 30 years, as a soloist and as the leader of her Repertory. Participated in all the major dance festivals of India. Performances abroad include India Festivals in USSR and Germany, performances in USA, Canada, Australia, England, Germany, Japan, South East Asia, UAE, Kuwait, Muscat, Sri Lanka, Senegal and Bangladesh. Sharmila Biswas is the Dance Director of late Rituparno Ghosh’s award winning film Chitrangada. Sharmila Biswas is Graded as an ‘Outstanding’ artiste by The Indian Council of Cultural Relations, Ministry of External Affairs, Govt. Of India and ‘Top’ artists by Doordarshan, India. She is the author of a textbook in Odissi dance, titled - Knowing Odissi.

Her biographical book ‘Offstage with Sharmila Biswas has been published by the National Indo-Canadian Council, Canada. Sharmila Biswas is the Recipient of the Sangeet Natak Akademi Award for her contribution to Odishi Dance.

== Awards ==
Biswas won the "Best Choreography Award" from the Ministry of Information and Broadcasting, Govt. of India, for her dance production, Sampurna based on the devdasis of Puri. In 1998, she received the Uday Shankar Award for Best Choreography from the Department of Information and Broadcasting, Government of West Bengal. In 2010, Biswas received the Mahari Award. In 2012, she was awarded the Sangeet Natak Akademi Award, the highest award for performing artists, from the Sangeet Natak Akademi, India's National Academy for Music, Dance, and Drama.

== Personal life ==
Sharmila married Swapan Kumar Biswas in 1987. They live in Kolkata and have one son.

== See also ==
- Dona Ganguly
