= Varadkar (surname) =

Varadkar is a Marathi toponymic surname from Varad, a village in the Sindhudurg district of Maharashtra, India. Notable people with the surname include:

- Leo Varadkar (born 1979), Irish politician and physician
- Mitalee Jagtap Varadkar, Indian actress
- Shubhada Varadkar (born 1961), Indian author and practitioner of Indian classical dance

== See also ==
- Varadka, village in Slovakia
