= Ramli bin Ibrahim =

Malaysian dancer and choreographer

Padma Shri Datuk Ramli Ibrahim
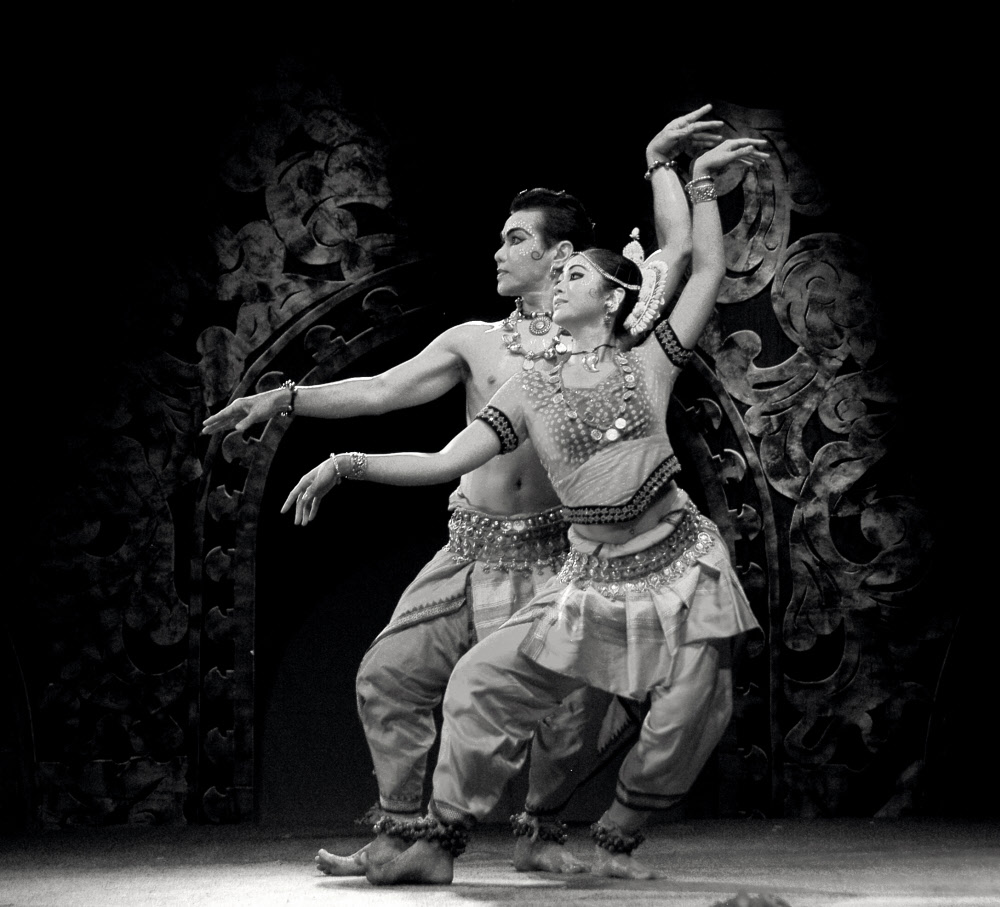
- In India in 2006, Ramli performing the Odissi dance
- Born: Ramli; 20 May 1953 (age 73); Kajang, Selangor, British Malaya
- Education: Deba Prasad Das
- Known for: Bharatanatyam

Datuk Ramli bin Ibrahim (born 20 May 1953) is a Malaysian choreographer and classical odissi dancer. He founded the Sutra Dance Theater as well as the Sutra Foundation to encourage people to learn various traditional dances. In 2018, the Government of India awarded him the Padma Shri for his contribution to Odissi.

== Early life and education ==
Ramli Ibrahim was born in Kajang, Selangor to Ibrahim bin Haji Mohmmad Amin, a school teacher, and Kamariah, a secretary of the United Malays National Organisation Women's Movement. He was raised in a liberal Muslim family. In an interview with The Hindu in 2016 he also claimed to be a singer.

Ramli studied mechanical engineering at the University of Western Australia. While he was there, he also joined and studied at the Australian Ballet School in Melbourne. At the same time, he met Chandrabhanu (Zamin Haroon), another Malaysian Islamic classical dancer using the Hindu name of Chandrabhanu. He studied Bharatanatyam under Adyar Lakshman. Later, he moved to Chennai to study under Lakshman. He was taught alongside other famous dancers such as Radha Anjali and Swapna Sundari.

Ramli started learning Odissi in New Delhi under Deba Prasad Das.

== Career ==
After returning to Malaysia in 1983, he established the Sutra Dance Theater in Kuala Lumpur. The theater focuses on the Malaysian art scene and strives to promote Malaysian art at the national and international level. It mainly associates itself with the Odissi dance which originated from the state of Odisha in India. In 2007, he established Yayasan Sutra in Malaysia.

== Awards ==
=== Padma Shri ===
He was awarded with the Padma Shri, one of the highest public honors for artists and others by the Government of India in 2018 for his contribution to Odissi as well as Bharathanatyam during his over 40 years of involvement. He received the honor at the Rashtrapati Bhavan from President Ram Nath Kovind while dressed in a black Baju Melayu and a songkok. In an interview with Bernama, he stated:

The award is a boost to Sutra Foundation. There will be the responsibility of rising up to the expectation of people who think that this award brings automatic success. I hope the award will help to foster more bilateral cultural links between Malaysia and India. What is even more important is that our initiatives are not motivated by political or economic agendas but for the love of Indian arts.

— Datuk Ramli bin Ibrahim, New Straits Times, 3 April 2018

=== Other awards ===
- Fulbright Distinguished Artist Award (1999)
- Angarag Lifetime Achievement Award (2006)
- Purush Award (2009)
- Ram Gopal Best Male Dancer Award (2011)
- Snageet Natak Academy Award
- Distinguished International Artist Award (2011)
