= Raghunath Panigrahi =

Suramani Pandit Raghunath Panigrahi
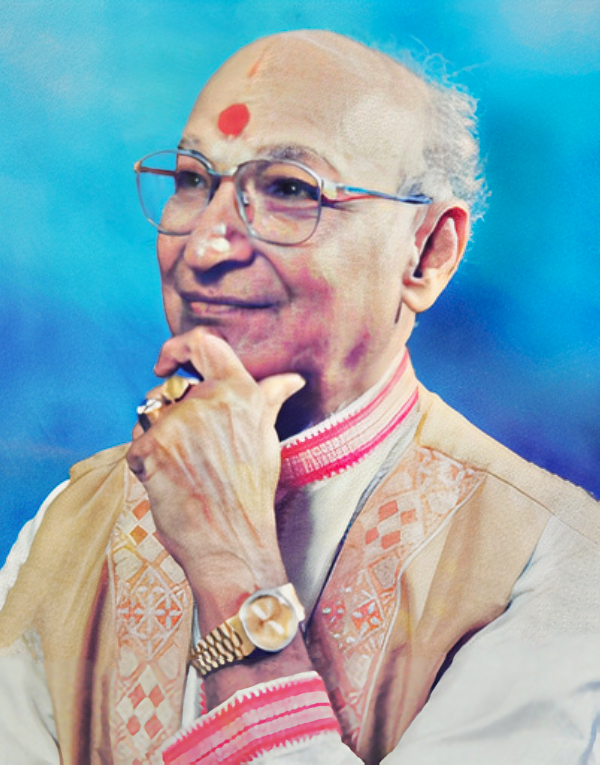

Background information
- Born: 10 August 1932; Gunupur, Odisha, India
- Died: 25 August 2013 (aged 81) Bhubaneswar, Odisha, India
- Genre: Odissi music
- Occupations: Odissi music Guru, singer, composer
- Years active: 1956-2013

Suramani' Pandit Raghunath Panigrahi (translit=Raghunātha Pāṇigrāhi; 10 August 1932 – 25 August 2013) was an Odissi music Guru, vocalist, composer and music director. He is most known for his renditions of Jayadeva's Gita Govinda and his vocal support for his wife, the Odissi danseuse Sanjukta Panigrahi. He was widely known as 'Gitagobinda Panigrahi'.

He formed the 'Sanjukta Panigrahi Memorial Trust' in 1999 to promote the cause of Odishi dance. Since 2001, every year on her birth anniversary, the trust has been giving away scholarships to budding dancers and awarding excellence in the field of Odissi dance.

== Early life and musical training ==
Panigrahi was born on 10 August 1932 in Gunupur, Rayagada, Odisha. Raghunath belonged to a family associated with Odissi music for centuries, members of which were 19th-century Odissi poet-composer Sadhaka Kabi Gourahari Parichha and Gayaka Siromani Apanna Panigrahi who was the royal musician (raja-sangitagya) of Paralakhemundi. He began his musical training under his father, Pt Neeelamani Panigrahi, who had been collecting traditional Odissi melodies of the Gita Govinda from the Jagannatha Temple of Puri. Subsequently, he was placed under the tutelage of the Odissi music exponent Pt Narasingha Nandasarma of Puri. Later, Raghunath continued learning Odissi music under Pt Narasingha Nandasarma and Pt Biswanatha Das.

== Career ==
He sang in Odia, Kannada, Tamil and Telugu films. Raghunath left a career in film music in Chennai to provide vocal support to his wife, Sanjukta Panigrahi, a noted Odissi performer and composer. He contributed to promoting the life and works of the 12th-century poet Jayadeva and the cult of Lord Jagannatha. Sanjukta-Raghunath performed together for several decades, from the 1960s until the 1990s.

After Sanjukta's death in 1997, he was associated with Nrityagram and composed music for many of their productions.

In 2012, his elder son, Partha Sarathi Panigrahi, renamed the foundation as ‘Sanjukta and Raghunath Panigrahi Cultural Heritage Foundation’ (SRPF).

== Personal life ==
He met his future wife dancer Padma Shri Sanjukta Panigrahi at Kalakshetra dance school, subsequently they married in 1960 and had two sons. The elder son, Parthasarathi Panigrahi, Baboo, is a classical and light classical singer.

He died on 25 August 2013 of cardiac arrest at his residence in Bhubaneswar at the age of 82.

== Filmography ==
Movie	Language	Year	Role
Ilavelpu	Telugu	1956	Playback singer
Jayabheri	Telugu	1959	Playback singer
Aval Yaar	Tamil	1959	Playback singer
Shri Shri Patitapabana	Odia	1963	Playback singer
Chinnada Gombe	Kannada	1964	Playback singer
Abhinetri	-	1965	Choreographer
Sindura Bindu	Odia	1976	Playback singer
Mukti	Odia	1977	Playback singer
Ahalya	Odia	1998	Music director
Nabajanma	Odia	-	Playback singer
Kaa	Odia	-	Playback singer

== Awards ==
- Title of Sur Mani 1968
- He received an award from the government of France in the 1980s.
- Sangeet Natak Akademi Award,1976
- State Sangeet Natak Akademi Award, 1993
- Padma Shri, 2010
- Sangeet Natak Akademi Fellowship
- Jayadeva Samman- 2008
- Lifetime Achievement award of Banichitra Awards, 2008
- Degree, Doctor of Literature, Ravenshaw University, Odisha, August 2013
- Degree, Doctor of Literature, Utkal University, Odisha, 2011
- Degree, Doctor of Literature, Berhampur University, Odisha, 2010
