= Shubhada Varadkar =

Dancer and author

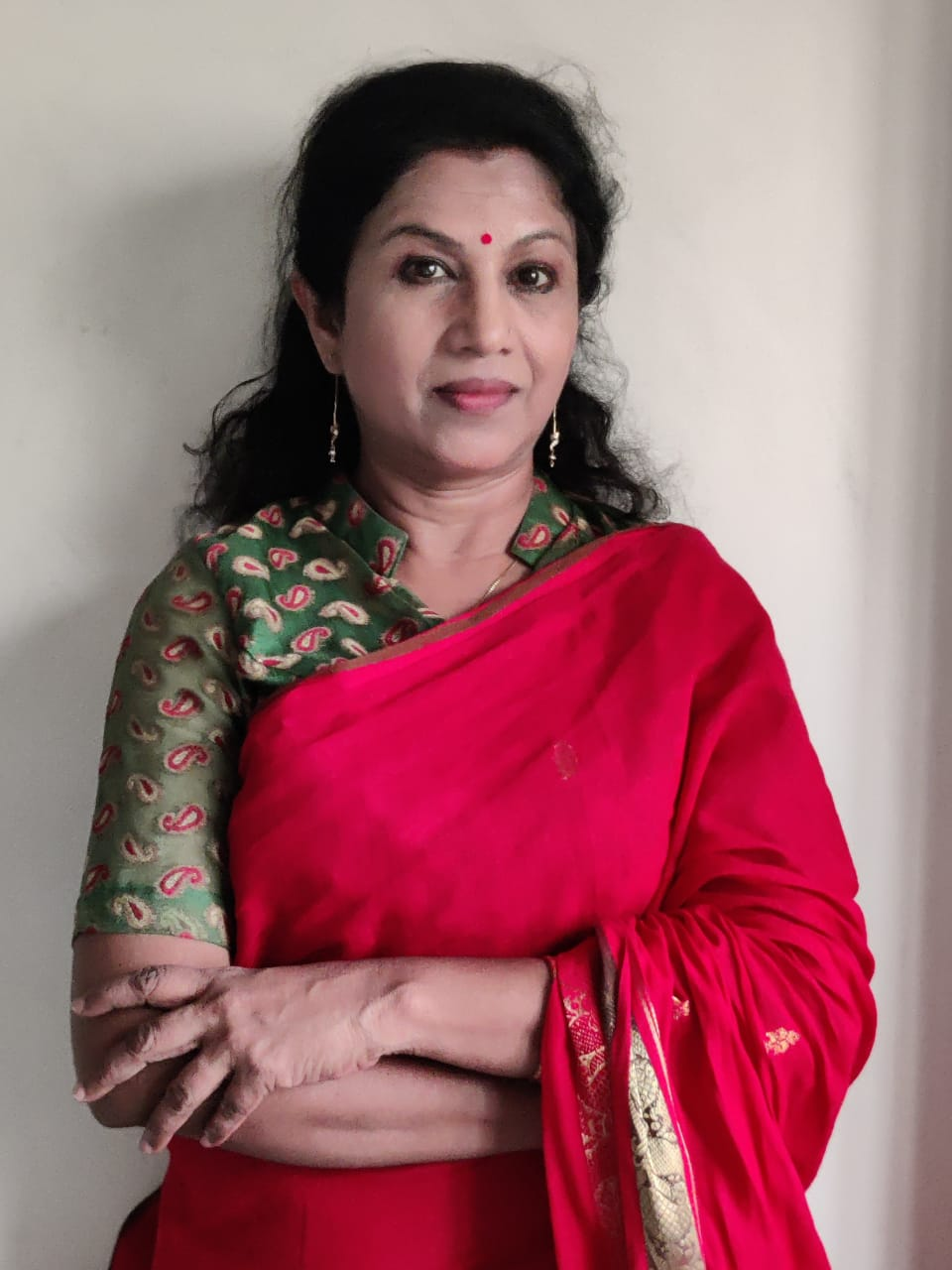
- Born: 9 August 1961 (age 65); Maharashtra, India
- Education: Masters in Economics and diploma in Bharatnatyam & Odissi
- Alma mater: Mumbai University
- Known for: Odissi Dance, Cancer Survivor
- Style: Odissi
- Awards: Sangwet Natak Akademi Award. Maharashtra State Cultural Award 2019-20

Shubhada Varadkar (born 9 August 1961) is an Odissi exponent, author and practitioner of Indian classical dance. She is the recipient of the Sangeet Natak Akademi Award. She is an 'A' grade National artist for Doordarshan. She has received the Maharashtra State Cultural Award 2019–20. For the first time created a collaboration called Flamencodissi, production of Odissi and Flameco in 2019. She presented Geet Govind verses in 1995

== Biography ==
Varadkar has a Master of Arts degree in economics from the University of Mumbai, Maharashtra and diploma in Bharat Natyam from the Kalasadan Institute of Fine Arts.

She was a newscaster with Indian Television in Mumbai.

She is an empanelled artist with the Indian Council for Cultural Relations (ICCR). and has a Senior Fellowship by Ministry of Culture (India), Government of India.

She is a disciple of Kelucharan Mohapatra, an Indian classical dancer, guru, and exponent of Odissi dance.

She is the author of Glimpses of Indian Classical Dance and Mayurpankh.

Shubhada Varadkar is the only Odissi Dancer to play Pickleball, a game where a perforated polymer ball strikes against a paddle.

She is a cousin of Irish Prime Minister (Taoiseach) Leo Varadkar.

She is the daughter of Indian freedom fighters Manohar Varadkar and Manik Varadkar.

== Reception ==
In 2013, a DNA review of a dance performance by Varadkar that she adapted from the poems of Swami Vivekananda noted "it was not just the poetic adaptation that drew large crowds to Ravindra Natya Mandir last weekend. There was the detail-rich performance, Varadkar's interpretation of Vivekanand's poems and of course her dancing." A 2017 review in the Mumbai Mirror of her performance of "Sakhi he Keshi Mathana Muradam" from the Gita Govinda by Jayadeva stated "Besides graceful movements, precise footwork and tender gestures, it was her abhinaya that raised it to a level above the ordinary." A 2019 review in The Hindu of an event that included a classical dance finale choreographed by Varadkar stated, "Training in Odissi under Guru Kelucharan Mohapatra and Bharatanatyam under Guru Mani have made Shubada a versatile artiste and choreographer with a quest for perfection."

== Books ==
She is the author of

- Celestial Plume
- The glimpse of Indian Classical dance
- Documentary - The book Celestial Plume has also been made into a documentary

== Performances ==
- Mayurpankh - Dance of Hope Production
- Malhaar Festival 2012 - organized by Indian Council of Cultural Relations
- Madhuram at NCPA, Mumbai
- Odissi in Venezuela 2017, Bolivar Theatre - led a 10-member troupe
- Creating performances for Cancer Awareness
- Panchakshara Stuti choreographed by Shubhada Varadkar
- Odissi dance on Swami Vivekananda's life 18 January 2019

== Awards ==
- Maharashtra State Cultural Award 2019-20
- Singar Mani award for Odissi by Sur Singar Samsad, 2000
- Mahari award for Odissi in 2011
- Kala Sarathi Award 2023
