= Kelucharan Mohapatra =

Indian classical dancer (1926–2004)

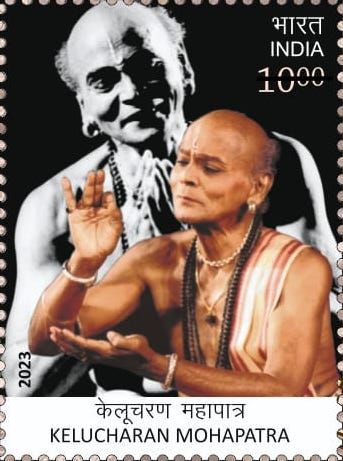
- Mohapatra on a 2023 stamp of India
- Born: 8 January 1926; Raghurajpur, Puri, Odisha, India
- Died: 7 April 2004 (aged 78); Bhubaneswar, Odisha, India
- Occupations: Indian classical dancer, choreographer
- Years active: 1935–2004
- Spouse: Laxmipriya Mohapatra
- Children: Ratikant Mohapatra
- Awards: Padma Vibhushan

Kelucharan Mohapatra (8 January 1926 – 7 April 2004) was a legendary Indian classical dancer, guru, and exponent of Odissi dance, who is credited with the revival and popularizing of this classical dance form in the 20th century. He is the first person to receive the Padma Vibhushan from Odisha.

A Sanskrit poet wrote about Mohapatra: Saango-paanga-subhangi-laasya-madhuram samteerna-nrutyaarnavam, which translates as – "Each fraction of his dancing body leads to paramount sweetness, through miraculous poses and postures. In fact, Guru Kelucharan Mohapatra crossed the ocean of styles."

== Early life and history ==
In his youth, Kelucharan Mohapatra performed Gotipua – a traditional dance form of Odisha in which young boys dress up as woman to praise Lord Jagannath. Later in his life he did extensive research on Gotipua and Mahari dance, which lead him to restructure Odissi dance. Guru Kelucharan Mohapatra was a master in Percussion instruments – Mardala and Tabla, which clearly resonates in his dance compositions. He was also skilled in the traditional Pattachitra painting.

Kelucharan Mohapatra along with his wife, Laxmipriya Mohapatra, herself a dancer, and their son Ratikant Mohapatra built Srjan in 1993. Kelucharan Mohapatra was conferred a Doctorate by the Akhil Bharatiya Gandharva Mahavidyalaya Mandal in 1981.

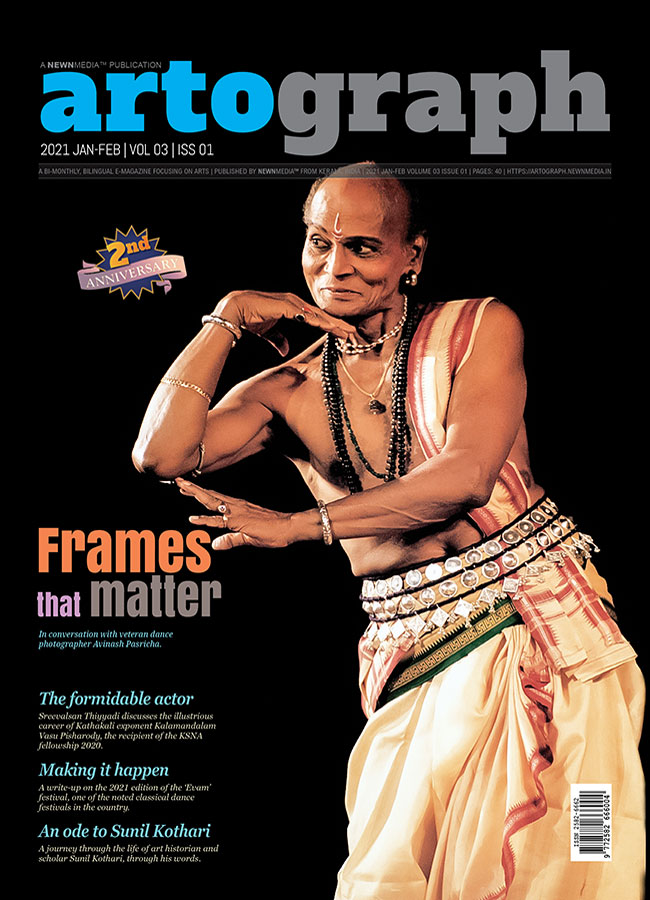
Mohapatra on the cover of Artograph in 2021

== Disciples ==
Some notable disciples include

- Sanjukta Panigrahi
- Kumkum Mohanty
- Madhavi Mudgal
- Nandini Ghosal
- Sonal Mansingh
- Protima Bedi
- Jhelum Paranjape
- Ratikant Mohapatra
- Sharmila Biswas
- Sujata Mohapatra
- Sharon Lowen
- Shubhada Varadkar

== Awards ==
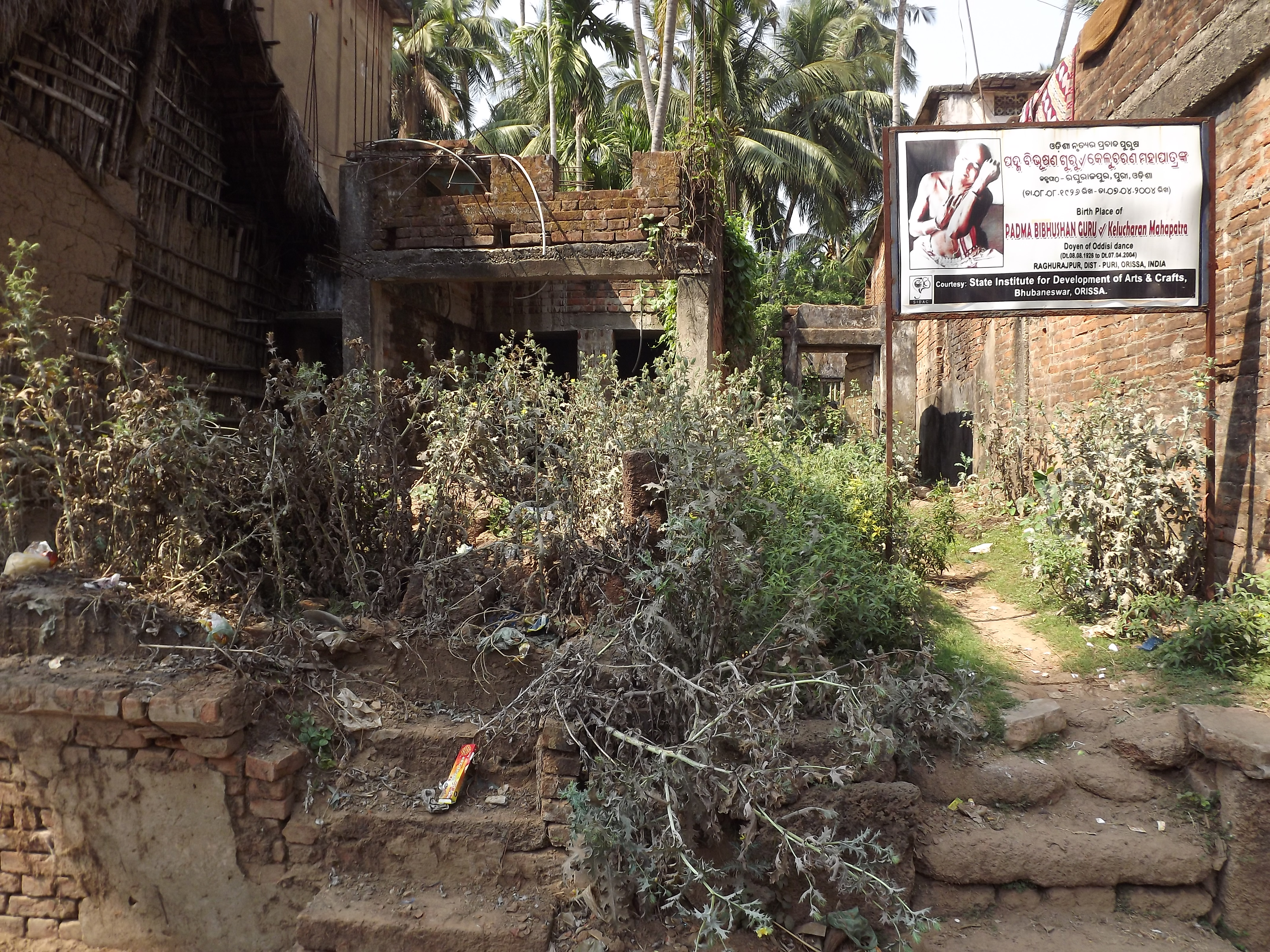
Birthplace of Guru Kelucharan Mohapatra at Raghurajpur, Odisha.

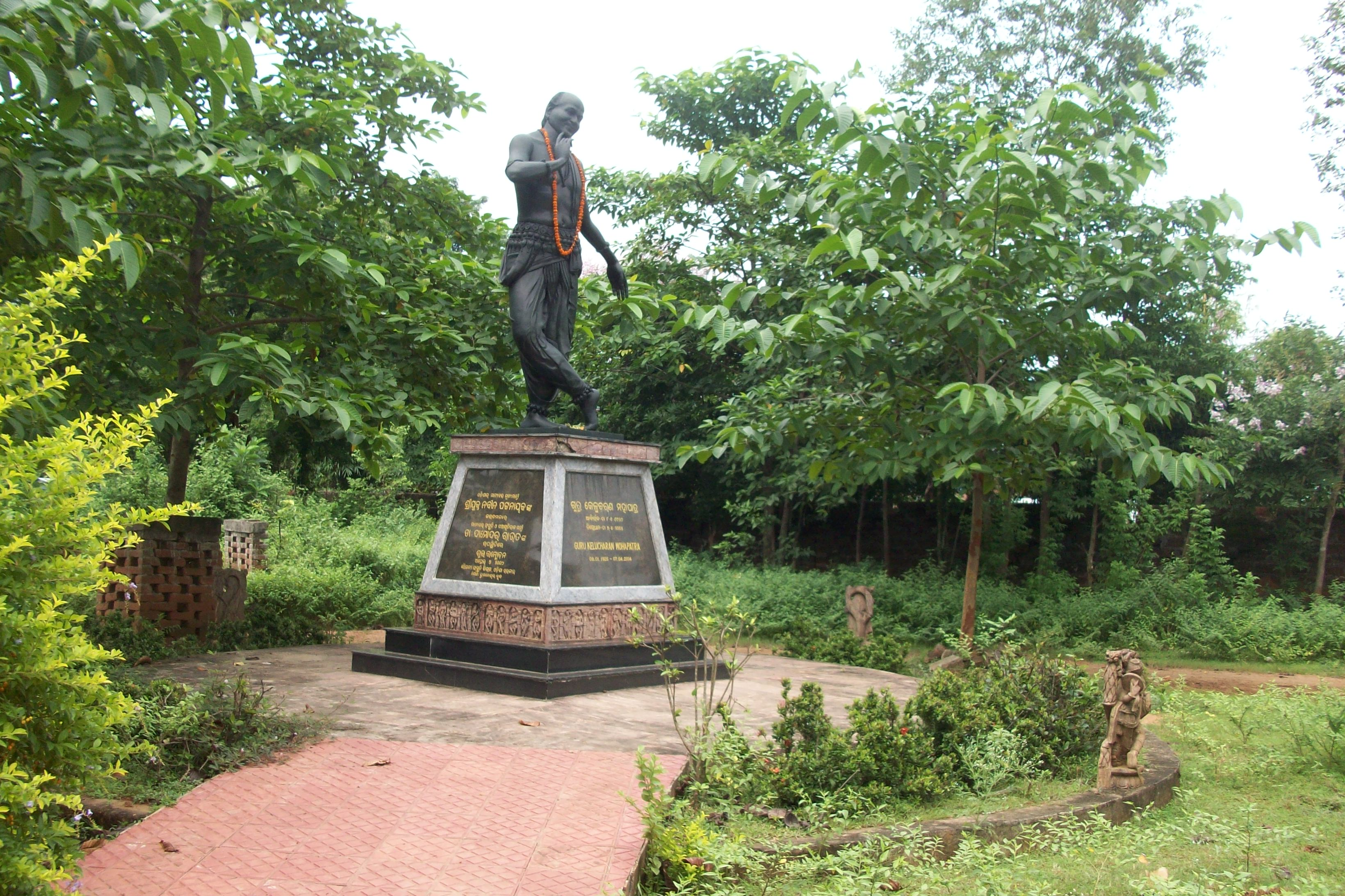
Statue of Kelucharan Mohapatra in Bhubaneswar

- Sangeet Natak Akademi Award, 1966
- Padma Shri, 1974
- Padma Bhushan, 1988
- Sangeet Natak Akademi Fellowship, 1991
- Padma Vibhushan, 2000
- Kalidas Samman from Madhya Pradesh government, 1989
- Srimanta Sankardeva Award from Assam government, 1997
- Kabi Samrat Upendra Bhanja Samman from Odisha government, 2000

== Quotes made by Kelucharan Mohapatra ==
- "Odissi is not a mere dance form to entertain people but to inspire and elevate. I don't actually dance but pray in compassion and the spectators say that this `form' is dancing."
- "The real dance must convey the feeling of undivided existence, that a spectator can feel that he is not different from the thing observed".
