= Ratikant Mohapatra =

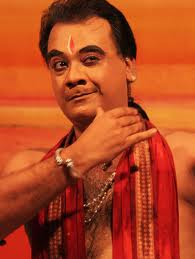

Background information
- Born: 24 December 1965 (age 60); Cuttack
- Origin: India
- Genre: Odissi
- Occupations: Indian classical dancer, Choreographer performer
- Spouse: Sujata Mohapatra
- Website: www.srjan.com/Guru_RatikantMohapatra.php

Ratikant Mohapatra is a dancer, percussionist, Guru, and Choreographer and archivist of Odissi. Under the direction and choreography of Ratikant Mohapatra, 555 Odissi dancers, a large number of them belonging to foreign countries, performed in unison at Kalinga Stadium, Bhubaneswar to enter their names in the Guinness Book of World Records. Odissi Dance entered into Indo-Chinese Movie The Desire under the choreography of Guru Ratikant Mohapatra.

== Dance choreography ==
- 2004: Varsha, Shantakaram, Sunaman (Hindi Abhinaya), Eka Lakshya Chaturpakshya, Bedanudharate (Dasavtara)
- 2005: Jaya Mahesha, Namodevi, Shiva Panchmukha Stotram, Allah, Jhumi Jhumi Gopiyan (Hindi Abhinaya), Mokshya
- 2006: Tarana Pallavi, Bhaja Govindam, Natangi, Bakratunda (Ganesh Bandana)
- 2007: Charukeshi Pallavi, Sudha Dhaibat Vibhash Pallvi, OM, Kahibu Jai (Odiya Abhinaya), Matangi Dhyanam.
- 2008: Nabadurga, Isi Basanta me, Nagendra Haraya, Sri Ramachandra Krupalu Bhajaman, Mrutyu, Megh Pallavi, Pattadip Pallavi, Nati Puja (Madhava Bhajan)
- 2009: Bali Badha, Geeta Govinda, Naari, Sakuntala, Shiva Vandana, Dasavtar, Ganapati Papa Morriya.
- 2010: Tantra, Swargatam Krishna.
- 2011: Guru Bramha, Ravana, Yathagamanam, Ananda Lahari
- 2012: Chandrakosh Pallavi, Nagendra Haraya, Bho Shambho & Bishwas
- 2013: Geetamritam, Saggy Baggy, Sabari
- 2014: Ardhanishwar, Samakala, Synthesis & Kubjaa
- 2015: Abhanga (Hey igo vithalle bhakta jana baschale), Tarana. Namami Gange, Odia Abhinaya "Se Shyama Chhabi Chhataka", Purnangabaradi Pallavi.
- 2016: Vinayaka-Smaranam, Tyaaga, Mahanayaka Bijayananda.
- 2017: Hari Smarane, Mangaladhwani Pallavi.
- 2018: Kirwani Madhurima, Maati
- 2019: Surya Vandana, Bramhadaru Smarami.
- 2020: Chandrachuda
- 2021: Parameshwari Pallavi & Meepa
- 2022: Manthara (From Ramayan)
- 2023: Jatatabi, Jeebanam Madhu Sangeetamayam, Sarashwati Vandana

== Awards and honors ==
- Conferred with the prestigious Sangeet Natak Akademi Award for Odissi Dance from the Government of India, New Delhi, 2016.
- Conferred with the prestigious ‘Odisha Sangeet Natak Akademi Puraskar’ for Odissi Dance from the Odisha Sangeet Natak Akademi, Dept. of Odia Literature, Language & Culture, Govt. of Odisha, 2019.
- Awarded with "A" Grade in Odissi Dance by Doordarshan, Government of India.
- Awarded with Ph.D. in Performing Arts by Kennedy University, Saint Lucia, USA, in January 2025
- Conferred with an Honorary Doctorate in Performing Arts by Washington Digital University, USA, in September 2024.
- Awarded the National Senior Fellowship in Odissi Dance for the year 2022–23 by the Ministry of Culture, Government of India.
- Conferred with SKGS Diamond Jubilee ‘Nritya Choodamani’ by Sri Krishna Gana Sabha, Chennai, 2014.
- Created a Guinness World Record for choreographing and directing 555 dancers in an Odissi dance composition, the first of its kind, performed at Kalinga Stadium, Bhubaneswar, Jointly organized by IPAP, USA, Department of Culture and Tourism, Government of Odisha.
- Received the Junior Fellowship in Mardala from the Ministry of Human Resource Development, Govt. of India.

== Performances ==
Some major performances staged by Ratikant Mohapatra are: France- Festival of India and International Mime Festival; Germany- Festival of India and Autumn Festival; Japan - Festival of India; Russia- Festival of India; United Kingdom- Festival of India, Sanskritik Festival; Canada- Society of Fine Arts & Dance Academy of Ms Meneka Thakkar; Hong Kong- Vrundavan Dance & Music Academy of Pdt. Hari Prasad Chaurasia; Dubai- Sponsored Programmes; USA- 70th International Birth Anniversary Celebration of Guru Kelucharan Mohapatra in 1996, India Festival, Sponsored programs; Australia- ICCR Cultural Delegate & Sponsored programmes.
