= Varad, Surat =

Varad is a village in Gujarat state, India, 5 km north of Bardoli.

Varad has a population of approximately 3701 people of various castes, the majority of whom are Patels. The village flourishes, with a number of NRIs helping to build the village. Varad is also equipped with a mineral water plant, which provides clean and safe drinking water for the village, and a free cold water plant in the middle of the village, open to the poor who can't afford a refrigerator at home. 300 people a day collect water from this plant, helped by the Bhulabhai family from Varad.

== Agriculture ==
Agricultural products of the village include sugarcane, rice, and various other seasonal crops.

== Geography ==
Varad is located at 21.12°N 73.12°E. It has an average elevation of 22 metres (72 feet). The majority of the area is covered with agricultural land.
