= Kumkum Mohanty =

Indian Odissi dancer

- Born: 10 September 1946 (age 80); Cuttack, Orissa, British India
- Education: Graduate, Pol. Sc.
- Alma mater: Utkal University
- Occupation: Administrator
- Children: 2
- Awards: Padma Shri; Sangeet Natak Akademi Award
- Website: www.geetagovinda.in

Kumkum Mohanty (born 10 September 1946) is an Odissi dancer.

Mohanty was born at Cuttack in The village Sukleswar. She received training from Guru Kelucharan Mohapatra at Kala Vikash Kendra. She is recognised for abhinaya. She has worked as the special secretary (Culture) to the Government of Odisha. After her retirement in 2004, she started her dance school Geeta govinda in 2006, in Bhubaneshwar. Currently she joined as an adjunct professor at School of Humanities, Social Sciences & Management, IIT Bhubaneswar

== Awards ==
- Guru Kelucharan Mahapatra Award, 2011
- Padma Shri, 2005
- Sangeet Natak Akademi Award, 1994
- Odisha Sangeet Natak Akademi, 1993
- 2nd Nrutyangada Samman
