= Gangadhar Pradhan =

Indian dancer (1948–2010)

- Born: 10 July 1948; Parikula, Puri district, Odisha
- Died: 10 October 2010 (aged 62)
- Occupation: Classical Dancer
- Children: 4
- Awards: Sangeet Natak Akademi Award, Padma Shri
- Website: konarkfestival.com

Gangadhar Pradhan (10 July 1948 – 10 October 2010) was an Indian Odissi dancer.

== Life and career ==
Pradhan was born in Parikula, a village in Puri district, Odisha. He was a sickly baby; his father, Muralidhar Pradhan, a farmer, and mother, Dwitika Devi, whose previous children had died, dedicated him to Balunkeshwar, the presiding deity of the temple in the nearby village of Dimirisena. When he was six, he became a Gotipua dancer at the temple and discovered a vocation for dance. He later trained at Utkal Sangeet Mahavidyalaya in Odissi and in playing the mardala, and accompanied Sanjukta Panigrahi as her co-dancer and percussionist. He was an accomplished choreographer.

He founded Orissa Dance Academy in Bhubaneswar in 1975, and Konark Natya Mandap in Konark in 1986, and also established both the Konark Dance Festival (also in 1986) and the Dhauli dance festival (in 2001), as well as several smaller dance festivals, and ran the Chitralekha Dance Academy Festival in Canada. He was a past president of the Orissa Sangeet Natak Akademi. In his later years, he organised a project to document the folk dance styles of the state.

== Personal life and death ==
Pradhan had a son and three daughters. In early 2010 he underwent an angioplasty at an Apollo hospital in Bhubaneswar, but he died on 10 October at the age of 62 after a cerebral haemorrhage.

== Awards and honours ==
Pradhan was the recipient of an honorary doctorate from Utkal University. He was awarded the Sangeet Natak Akademi Award in 1998 and the Padma Shri (Indian's fourth highest civilian award) in 2008.
