= Sanjukta Panigrahi =

Indian Odissi Performer

- Born: 24 August 1944; Berhampur, Odisha, India
- Died: 24 June 1997 (aged 52) Bhubaneswar
- Occupations: Indian classical dancer, choreographer
- Years active: 1950s–1997
- Spouse: Raghunath Panigrahi
- Awards: Padma Shri (1975); Sangeet Natak Akademi Award (1976)

Sanjukta Panigrahi (24 August 1944 – 24 June 1997) was a classical dancer from India, who was the foremost exponent of Indian classical dance Odissi. Sanjukta was the first Odia woman to embrace this ancient classical dance at an early age and ensure its grand revival.

In recognition of her contribution to dance, she was honored with one of India's highest civilian awards the, Padma Shri (1975). She was also recipient of the Sangeet Natak Akademi Award in 1976.

Apart from presenting Odissi performances in different parts of India, Sanjukta Panigrahi was part of Government's cultural delegation to different countries, including to the US and the Philippines (1969), United Kingdom (1983), Israel, Delphi International Festival in Greece (1989). She has also performed in France for eleven weeks, and participating there in the International Music Festival in Paris.

== Early life and background ==
Panigrahi was born in Berhampur, Ganjam District, Odisha state, to a traditional Brahmin family of Abhiram Mishra and Shakuntala Mishra.

When she was a small child, she would start dancing intuitively to any rhythmic sound like the sound of chopping of vegetable or cutting of firewood. Her mother was from Baripada and belonged to a family, which had been patronising chhau folk dance for long. She recognised the talent in her daughter, and encouraged her despite some initial resistance from Abhiram Misra, Sanjukta's father. The reason for the resistance was that in those days this form of dance was performed generally by temple dancing girls, called Maharis. Male dancers are called Gotipuas. These girls were like Devadasis in the temples of South India.

== Training ==
At the initiative of her mother, she started to learn dance from Kelucharan Mohapatra aged four. She was assessed to be the best child artist by the Bisuba Milan consecutively for three years during 1950–1953.

In one of her performances as six-year-old girl, she refused to leave the stage and continued to perform energetically even after the time was over. Her mother had to shout at and cajole her to stop dancing. At nine, she performed at annual festival of the Children's Little Theatre in Calcutta.

She won the first prize in International Children's Film Festival in 1952. Encouraged by her success, her parents decided to send her for better dance training, to Kalakshetra at Chennai. There she continued her lessons under the guidance of Rukmini Devi Arundale. For the next six years she stayed there, and eventually graduated with a Nrityapraveen diploma in Bharatnatyam with Kathakali as the second subject. After that, she toured many places in India and abroad, as a member of the 'Kalakshetra Ballet Troupe'.

At the age of 14, she returned to Odisha. The state government awarded her a scholarship to learn Kathak from Guru Hazarilal in Bharatiya Vidya Bhavan, Mumbai. However, she left the course and returned to Odisha to concentrate on Odissi.

== Career ==
The initial years were very challenging for the Sanjukta and her husband, more in terms of eking out a living than anything else. Though things turned for the better, when in 1966, her guru Kelucharan Mahapatra was conferred with the Sangeet Natak Akademi Award, and she rendered an Odissi performance during the award ceremony in New Delhi. The audience was enthralled by her performance. She had made her mark at the national level, and from that point she did not look back.

Meanwhile, her husband had emerged as a fine vocalist, and also started rendering music for her performances. In the coming decades, the Sanjukta-Raghunath duo enthralled the audience, even outlasting the Yamini-Jyothismathi duo, and were jointly awarded the Sangeet Natak Akademi Award in 1976.

Sanjukta later came to be known as Guru Kelucharan Mahapatra's greatest disciple, and they travelled the length and the breath of the India, performing together and popularising the almost lost dance form of Odissi, so much so that today, both are considered equal revivalists of the dance form.

== Dance style ==
Sanjukta Panigrahi spent some time at the International School of Theatre Anthropology at Bologna, Italy in 1986, 1990 and 1992, teaching short courses and demonstrating Odissi dance to foreign students, further adding to its global popularity.

Sanjukta's forte was her Nritta, or pure dance, in which she was outstanding. Her great advantage was her musician husband, whose constant presence helped her finesse her abilities in this genre. In Abhinaya (interpretation of poetry), connoisseurs and critics were agreed on the fact that she more often than not veered towards jatra and melodrama.

Together with her musician husband, Sanjukta has left behind a repertoire of Odissi dance, both modern as well as classical, ranging from traditional numbers based on the Jayadeva's Gita Govinda to the padabalies of Surdas, Chaupais from the Ramacharitamanasa of Tulasidas and the songs of Vidyapati and Rabindranath Tagore, with piece-de-resistance being, the Yugma-Dwanda: a sort of Jugalbandi between the dancer and the musician in Raga Bageshri, composed by Pandit Raghunath Panigrahi and Moksha Mangalam which in time had become her personal signature, which she used to end her performances.

In the words of noted dance critic, Dr. Sunil Kothari, "Sanjukta gave up Bharatnatyam and devoted her life to Odissi, putting her signature on the form."

== Later years ==
She continued to perform in most of the state functions. With her pioneering efforts, she brought forth an almost forgotten Odissi style of dancing to an important position in the dance repertory of India.

She died of cancer at the age of 52, on 24 June 1997.

== Personal life ==
At Kalakshetra, Chennai, she had fallen in love with Raghunath Panigrahi, ten-year her senior, and a fine vocalist of Gita Govinda, who left a promising career in film music in Chennai, to provide vocal support in her performances. When she was 16 years of age, they got married and over a period of time had two sons.

== Legacy ==
Sanjukta left behind many accomplished students, including Dr. Chitra Krishnamurti, director of Nrityalaya (an Odissi school in Potomac) and Joyoti Das a resident of Melbourne, a devout disciple of her in Australia, the artistic director and teacher of Kalamandir School of Indian classical dances, dedicated to maintain the continuum of Sanjukta's Odissi style. Sanjukta Panigrahi is considered an embodiment of Guru Kelucharan Mahapatra's art.

=== Sanjukta Panigrahi Awards ===
After her death, her husband Raghunath Panigrahi formed a trust in her name, 'Sanjukta Panigrahi Memorial Trust', in 1999, to promote the cause of Odissi dance. Since 2001, every year on her birth anniversary, the trust has been giving away scholarships to budding dancers, and awards excellence in the field of Odissi dance.

== Quotes ==
- "I had two gurus, each with contradicting views. Rukmini Devi Arundale stressed technique while Guru Kelucharan Mohapatra insisted upon forgetting technique. I was confused. Much later I realized that with dedication and hard work, technique would follow automatically." As told to a disciple, Joyoti Das.
- "Shakti [. . .] which is neither masculine nor feminine [. . .]. A performer of either sex is always Shakti, energy which creates."

== Films on Sanjukta Panigrahi ==
- Encounter With the Gods: Odissi Dance With Sanjukta Panigrahi. 1999

== See also ==
- Indian women in dance
