= Odissi =

Classical dance of India

Odishi
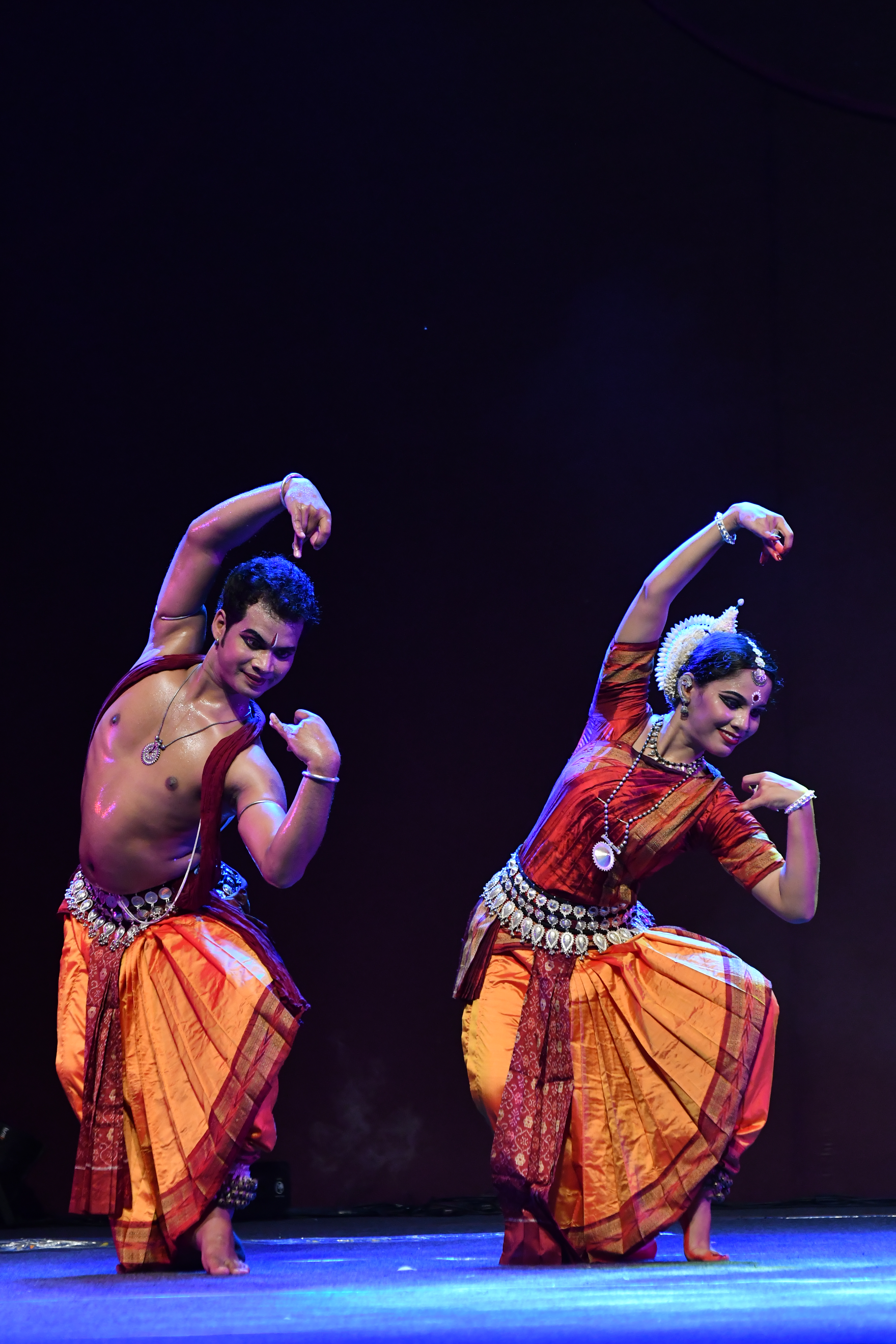
- Odissi performance at Nishagandi Dance Festival 2024
- Native name: ଓଡ଼ିଶୀ
- Genre: Indian classical dance
- Origin: Odisha, India

Odissi (Odia: ଓଡ଼ିଶୀ) also referred to as Orissi in old literature, oldest surviving classical dance of India, is a major ancient Indian classical dance that originated in the temples of Odisha – an eastern coastal state of India. It is one of the eight classical dances of India, recognized by the Sangeet Natak Academy. Odissi, in its history, was performed predominantly by women, and expressed religious stories and spiritual ideas, particularly of Vaishnavism through songs written and composed according to the ragas & talas of Odissi music by ancient poets of the state. Odissi performances have also expressed ideas of other traditions such as those related to Hindu deities Shiva and Surya, as well as Hindu goddesses (Shaktism).

The theoretical foundations of Odissi trace to the ancient Sanskrit text Natya Shastra, its existence in antiquity evidenced by the dance poses in the sculptures of Kalingan temples, and archeological sites related to Hinduism, Buddhism and Jainism. It was suppressed under British Rule. The suppression was protested by the Indians, followed by its revival, reconstruction and expansion since India gained independence from the colonial rule.

Odissi is traditionally a dance-drama genre of performance art, where the artist(s) and musicians play out a story, a spiritual message or devotional poem from the Hindu texts, using symbolic costumes, body movement, abhinaya (expressions) and mudras (gestures and sign language) set out in ancient Sanskrit literature. Classical Odia literature & the Gita Govinda set to traditional Odissi music are used for the abhinaya. Odissi is learnt and performed as a composite of basic dance motif called the Bhangas (symmetric body bends, stance). It involves lower (footwork), mid (torso) and upper (hand and head) body as three sources of perfecting expression and audience engagement with geometric symmetry and rhythmic musical resonance. An Odissi performance repertoire includes invocation, nritta (pure dance), nritya (expressive dance), natya (dance drama) and moksha (dance climax connoting salvation of the soul and spiritual release).

Traditional Odissi exists in two major styles, the first perfected by women and focussed on solemn, spiritual temple dance (maharis); the second perfected by boys dressed as girls (gotipuas) which diversified to include athletic and acrobatic moves, and were performed from festive occasions in temples to general folksy entertainment. Modern Odissi productions by Indian artists have presented a diverse range of experimental ideas, culture fusion, themes and plays.

Odissi was the only Indian dance form present in Michael Jackson's 1991 hit single "Black or White".

== History of Odissi ==
The foundations of Odissi are found in Natya Shastra, the ancient Hindu Sanskrit text of performance arts. The basic dance units described in the Natya Shastra, all 108 of them, are identical to those in Odissi. The text is attributed to the ancient scholar Bharata Muni, and its first complete compilation is dated to between 200 BCE and 200 CE, but estimates vary between 500 BCE and 500 CE. The most studied version of the Natya Shastra text consists of about 6000 verses structured into 36 chapters. The text, states Natalia Lidova, describes the theory of Tāṇḍava dance (Shiva), the theory of rasa, of bhāva, expression, gestures, acting techniques, basic steps, standing postures – all of which are part of Indian classical dances. Dance and performance arts, states this ancient text, are a form of expression of spiritual ideas, virtues and the essence of scriptures. The Natya Shastra refers to four pravrittis (methods of expressive delivery) in vogue – Avanti, Dakshinatya, Panchali and Odra-Magadhi; of these, the Odra refers to Odisha.

More direct historical evidence of dance and music as an ancient performance art are found in archaeological sites such as caves and in temple carvings of Bhubaneswar, Konark and Puri. The Manchapuri cave in Udayagiri shows carvings of dance and musicians, and this has been dated to the time of Jain king Kharavela in the first or second century BCE. The Hathigumpha inscriptions, also dated to the same ruler, mention music and dance :

(he [the king]) versed in the science of the Gandharvas (i.e., music), entertains the capital with the exhibition of dapa, dancing, singing and instrumental music and by causing to be held festivities and assemblies (samajas)...

— Hathigumpha inscription, Line 5, ~ 2nd–1st century BCE

The classical music tradition of Odisha, known as Odissi music, also has ancient roots. Archeologists have reported the discovery of 20-key, carefully shaped polished basalt lithophone in Sankarjang, the highlands of Odisha, which is dated to about 1000 BCE.

=== Medieval era ===
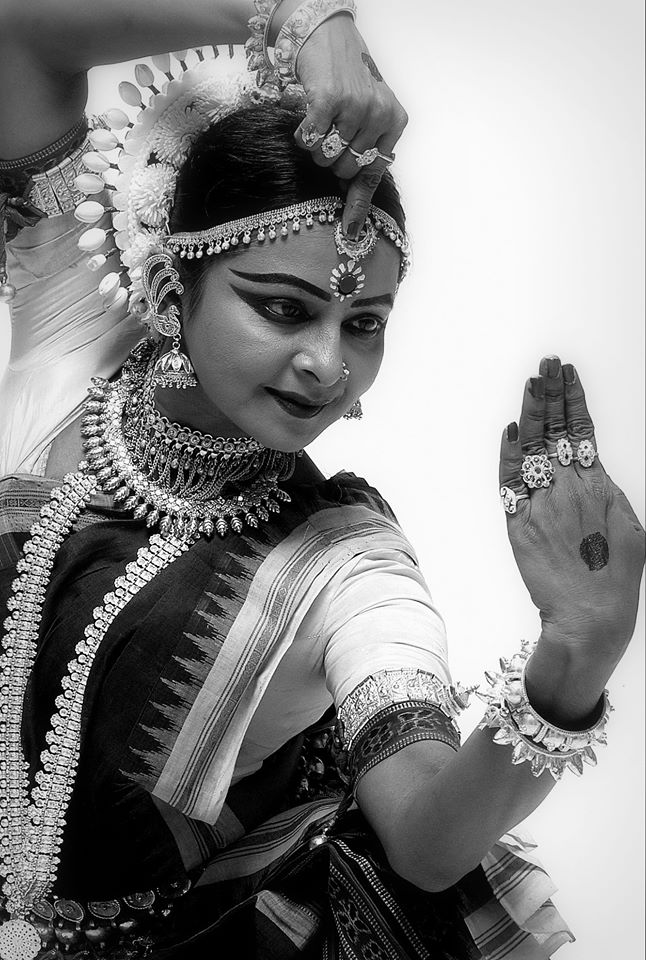
Odissi dancer

The Hindu, Jain and Buddhist archaeological sites in Odisha state, particularly the Assia range of hills show inscriptions and carvings of dances that are dated to the 6th to 9th century CE. Important sites include the Ranigumpha in Udaygiri, and various caves and temples at Lalitgiri, Ratnagiri and Alatgiri sites. The Buddhist icons, for example, are depicted as dancing gods and goddesses, with Heruka, Vajravarahi, and Marichi in Odissi-like postures. Historical evidence, states Alexandra Carter, shows that Odissi Maharis (Hindu temple dancers) and dance halls architecture (nata-mandapa) were in vogue at least by the 9th century CE.

According to Kapila Vatsyayan, the Kalpasutra of Jainism, in its manuscripts discovered in Gujarat, includes classical Indian dance poses – such as the Samapada, the Tribhangi and the Chauka of Odissi. This, states Vatsyayan, suggests that Odissi was admired or at least well known in distant parts of India, far from Odisha in the medieval era, to be included in the margins of an important Jain text. However, the Jain manuscripts use the dance poses as decorative art in the margins and cover, but do not describe or discuss the dance. Hindu dance texts such as the Abhinaya Chandrika and Abhinaya Darpana provide a detailed description of the movements of the feet, hands, the standing postures, the movement and the dance repertoire. It includes illustrations of the karanas mentioned in Natya Shastra. Similarly, the illustrated Hindu text on temple architecture from Odisha, the Shilpa Prakasha, deals with Odia architecture and sculpture, and includes Odissi postures.

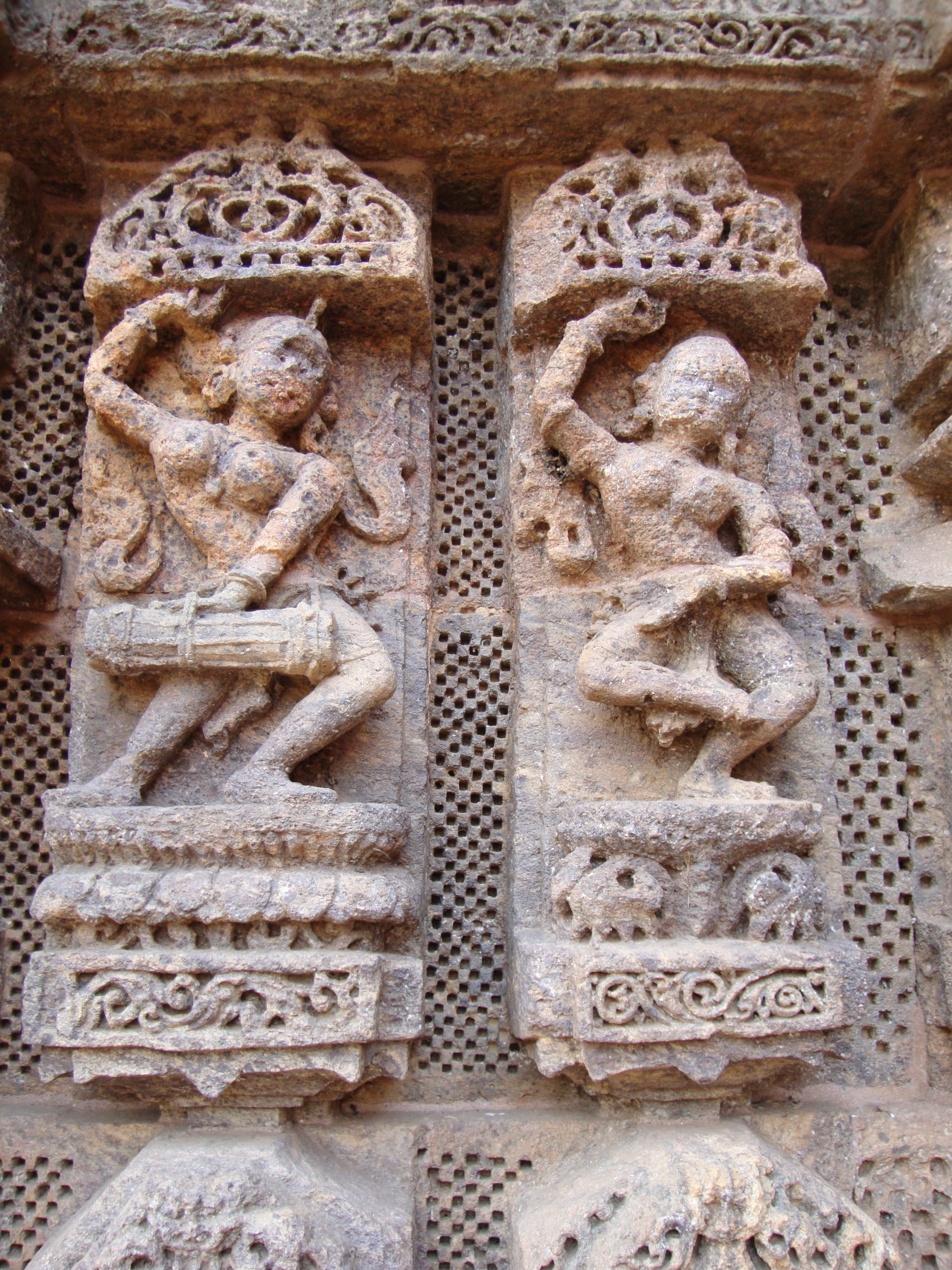
Musician and dancer relief at the Konark Sun temple.

Actual sculptures that have survived into the modern era and panel reliefs in Odia temples, dated to be from the 10th to 14th century, show Odissi dance. This is evidenced in Jagannatha temple in Puri, as well as other temples of Vaishnavism, Shaivism, Shaktism and Vedic deities such as Surya (Sun) in Odisha. There are several sculptures of dancers and musicians in Konark Sun Temple and Brahmeswara Temple in Bhubaneswar.

The composition of the poetic texts by 8th-century Shankaracharya and particularly of divine love inspired Gitagovinda by 12th-century Jayadeva influenced the focus and growth of modern Odissi. Odissi was performed in the temples by the dancers called Maharis, who played out these spiritual poems and underlying religious plays, after training and perfecting their art of dance starting from an early age, and who were revered as auspicious to religious services.

=== Mughal and British period ===
After 12th-century, Odia temples, monasteries and nearby institutions such as the Puspagiri in the eastern Indian subcontinent came under waves of attacks and ransacking by Muslim armies, a turmoil that impacted all arts and eroded the freedoms previously enjoyed by performance artists. The official records of Sultan Firuz Shah Tughlaq's invasion in Odisha (1360–1361 CE), for example, describe the destruction of the Jagannath temple as well as numerous other temples, defacing of dancing statues, and ruining of dance halls. This led to a broad decline in Odissi and other religious arts, but there were some benevolent rulers in this period who supported arts particularly through performances at courts. During the Sultanate and Mughal era of India, the temple dancers were moved to entertain the Sultan's family and courts. They became associated with concubinage to the nobility.

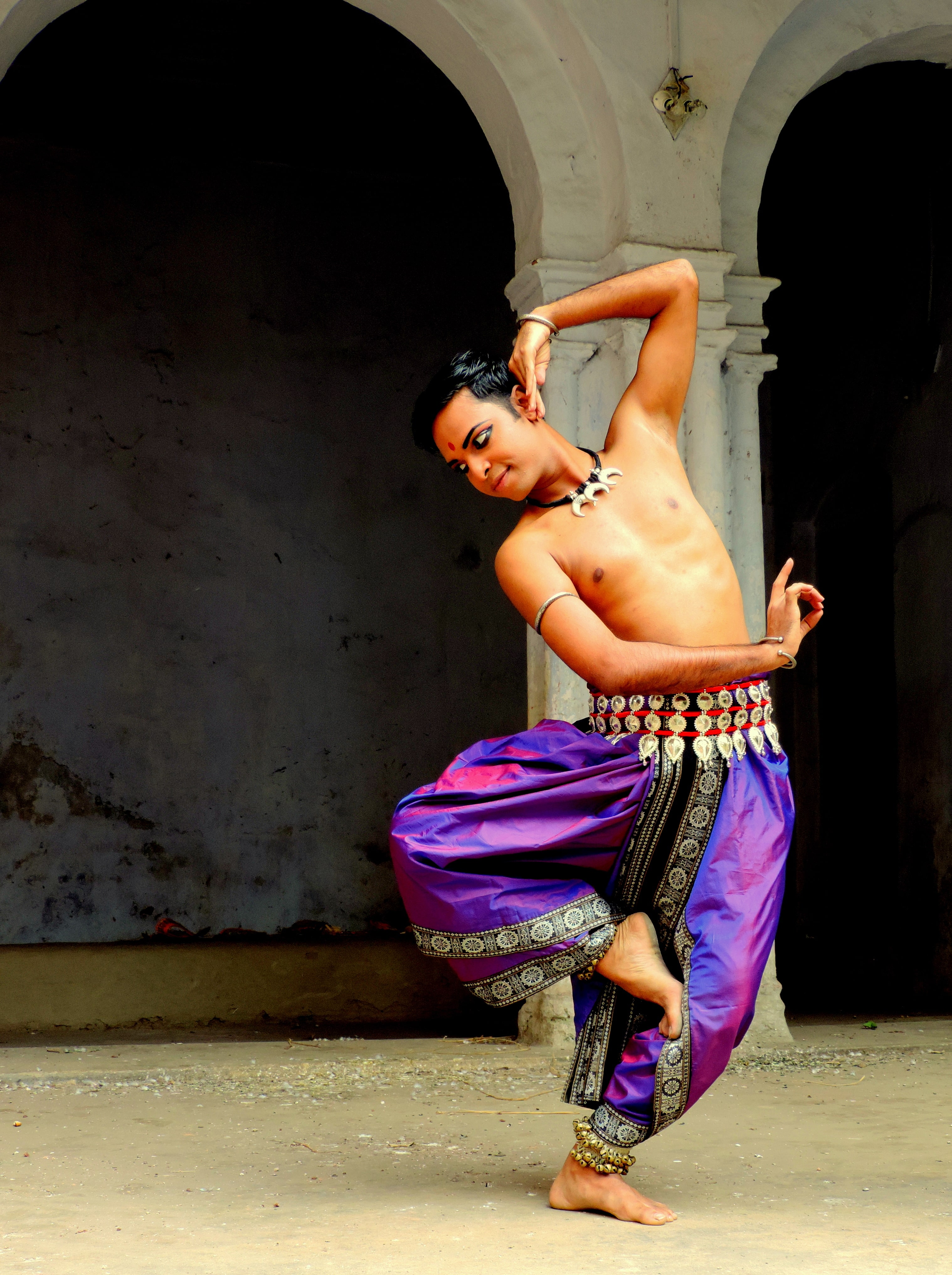
A male Odissi dancer

The Odissi dance likely expanded in the 17th century, states Alexandra Carter, under King Ramachandradeva's patronage. This expansion integrated martial arts (akhanda) and athletics into Odissi dance, by engaging boys and youth called Gotipuas, as a means to physically train the young for the military and to resist foreign invasions. According to Ragini Devi, historical evidence suggests that the Gotipuas tradition was known and nurtured in the 14th century, by Raja of Khordha.

During the British Raj, the officials of the colonial government ridiculed the temple traditions, while Christian missionaries launched a sustained attack on the moral outrage of sensuousness of Odissi and other Hindu temple dance arts. In 1872, a British civil servant named William Hunter watched a performance at the Jagannatha temple in Puri, then wrote, "Indecent ceremonies disgraced the ritual, and dancing girls with rolling eyes put the modest worshipper to the blush...", and then attacked them as idol-worshipping prostitutes who expressed their devotion with "airy gyrations".

Christian missionaries launched the "anti-dance movement" in 1892, to ban all such dance forms. The dancers were frequently stigmatized as prostitutes by Europeans during the colonial era. In 1910, the British colonial government in India banned temple dancing, and the dance artists were reduced to abject poverty from the lack of any financial support for performance arts, combined with stereotyping stigma.

=== Post-independence ===
The temple dance ban and cultural discrimination during colonial rule marshalled a movement by Hindus to question the stereotypes and to revive the regional arts of India, including Odissi. Due to these efforts, the classical Indian dances witnessed a period of renaissance and reconstruction, which gained momentum particularly after Indians gained their freedom from colonialism.

Odissi, along with several other major Indian dances gained recognition after efforts by many scholars and performers in the 1950s, particularly by Kavichandra Kalicharan Pattanayak, an Oriya poet, dramatist and researcher. Pattanayak is also credited with naming the dance form as "Odissi".

== Repertoire ==
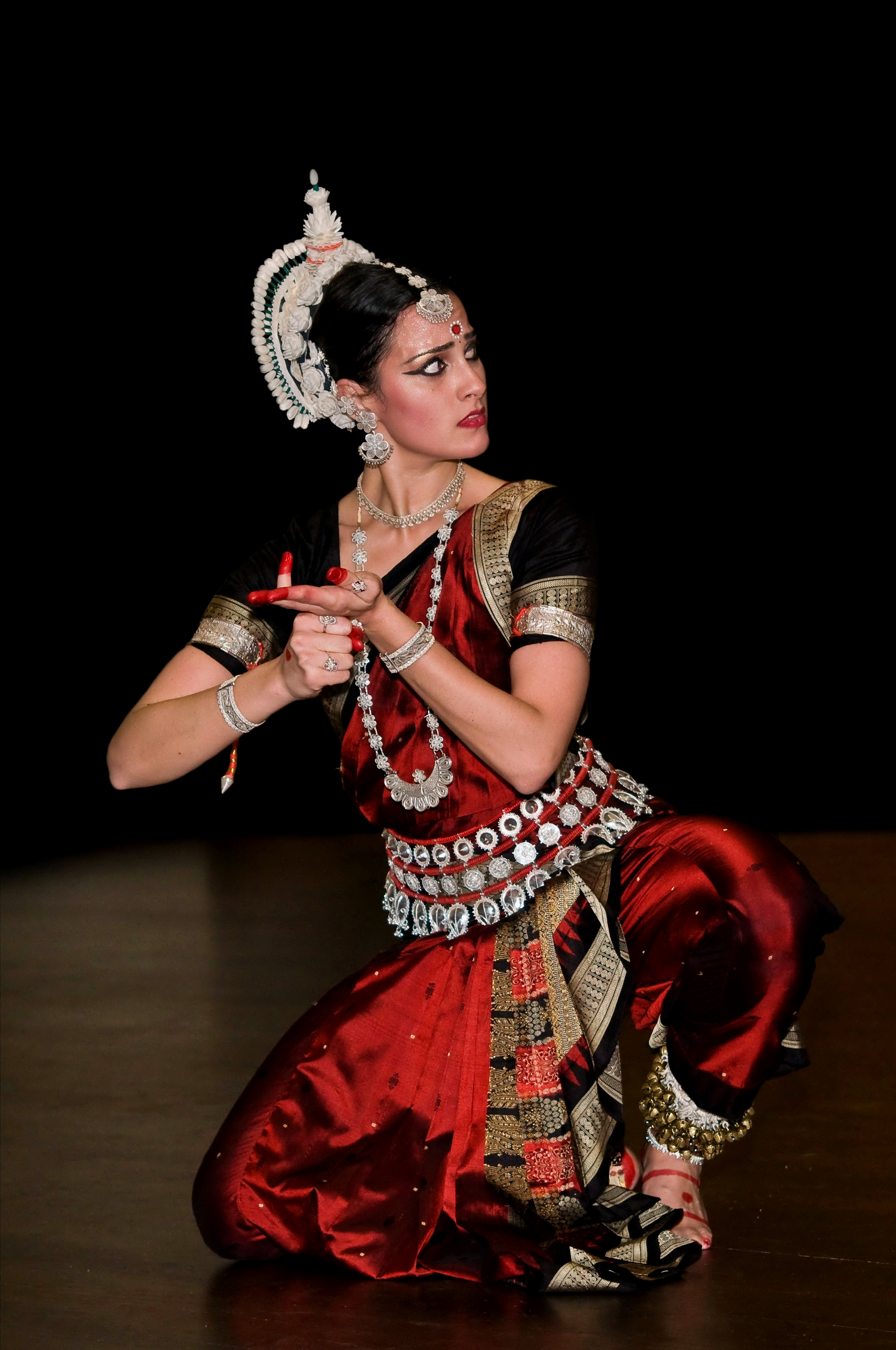
An Odissi dancer in nritya (expressive) stage of the dance.

Odissi, in the classical and medieval period has been, a team dance founded on Hindu texts. This drama-dance involved women (Maharis) enacting a spiritual poem or a religious story either in the inner sanctum of a Hindu temple, or in the Natamandira attached to the temple. The Odissi performing Maharis combined pure dance with expression, to play out and communicate the underlying text through abhinaya (gestures). The performance art evolved to include another aspect, wherein teams of boys – dressed as girls – called Gotipuas expanded the Odissi repertoire, such as by adding acrobatics and athletic moves, and they performed both near the temples and open fairs for general folksy entertainment. In the Indian tradition, many of the accomplished gotipuas became the gurus (teachers) in their adulthood. Modern Odissi is a diversified performance art, men have joined the women, and its reconstruction since the 1950s have added new plays and aspects of other Indian dances.

Love is a universal theme and one of the paradigmatic values in Indian religions. This theme is expressed through sensuous love poems and metaphors of sexual union in Krishna-related literature, and as longing eros (Shringara) in its dance arts such as in Odissi, from the early times. Hinduism, states Judith Hanna, encourages the artist to "strive to suggest, reveal or re-create the infinite, divine self", and art is considered as "the supreme means of realizing the Universal Being". Physical intimacy is not something considered as a reason for shame, rather considered a form of celebration and worship, where the saint is the lover and the lover is the saint. This aspect of Odissi dancing has been subdued in the modern post-colonial reconstructions, states Alexandra Carter, and the emphasis has expanded to "expressions of personal artistic excellence as ritualized spiritual articulations".

The traditional Odissi repertoire, like all classical Indian dances, includes Nritta (pure dance, solo), Nritya (dance with emotions, solo) and Natya (dramatic dance, group). These three performance aspects of Odissi are described and illustrated in the foundational Hindu texts, particularly the Natya Shastra, Abhinaya Darpana and the 16th-century Abhinaya Chandrika by Maheshwara Mahapatra of Odisha.

- The Nritta performance is abstract, fast and rhythmic aspect of the dance. The viewer is presented with pure movement in Nritta, wherein the emphasis is the beauty in motion, form, speed, range and pattern. This part of the repertoire has no interpretative aspect, no telling of story. It is a technical performance, and aims to engage the senses (prakriti) of the audience.
- The Nritya is slower and expressive aspect of the dance that attempts to communicate feelings, storyline particularly with spiritual themes in Hindu dance traditions. In a nritya, the dance-acting expands to include silent expression of words through the sign language of gestures and body motion set to musical notes. This part of a repertoire is more than sensory enjoyment, it aims to engage the emotions and mind of the viewer.
- The Natyam is a play, typically a team performance, but can be acted out by a solo performer where the dancer uses certain standardized body movements to indicate a new character in the underlying story. A Natya incorporates the elements of a Nritya.
- The Mokshya is a climatic pure dance of Odissi, aiming to highlight the liberation of soul and serenity in the spiritual.

Odissi dance recitals are in Odia and Sanskrit language and the music strictly follows ragas and talas of the Odissi music tradition. The talas used in Odissi dance are Ekatali, Khemata, Rupaka, Tripata, Jhampa, Jati Tala, Adatali, Matha, Aditala, Sarimana, Kuduka and others.

=== Sequence ===
Traditional Odissi repertoire sequence starts with an invocation called Mangalacharana. A shloka (hymn) in praise of a god or goddess is sung, such as to Jagannath (an avatar of Vishnu), the meaning of which is expressed through dance. Mangalacharana is followed by Pushpanjali (offering of flowers) and Bhumi Pranam (salutation to mother earth). The invocation also includes Trikhandi Pranam or the three-fold salutation – to the devas (gods), to the gurus (teachers) and to the lokas or rasikas (fellow dancers and audience).

Odissi dance drama

The next sequential step in an Odissi performance is Batu, also known as Battu Nrutya or Sthayee Nrutya or Batuka Bhairava. It is a fast pace, pure dance (nritta) performed in the honor of Shiva. There is no song or recitation accompanying this part of the dance, just rhythmic music. This pure dance sequence in Odissi builds up to a Pallavi which is often slow, graceful and lyrical movements of the eyes, neck, torso and feet and slowly builds in a crescendo to climax in a fast tempo at the end.

The nritya follows next, and consists of Abhinaya, or an expressional dance which is an enactment of a song or poetry. The dancer(s) communicate the story in a sign language, using mudras (hand gestures), bhavas (enacting mood, emotions), eye and body movement. The dance is fluid, graceful and sensual. Abhinaya in Odissi is performed to verses recited in Sanskrit or Odia language. Most common are Abhinayas on Oriya songs or Sanskrit Ashthapadis or Sanskrit stutis like the Dashavatara Stotra (depicting the ten incarnations of Vishnu) or the Ardhanari Stotra (half man, half woman form of the divine). Many regionally performed Abhinaya compositions are based on the Radha-Krishna theme. The Astapadis of the Radha-Krishna love poem Gita Govinda written by Jayadeva are usually performed in Odisha, as part of the dance repertoire.

The natya part, or dance drama, is next in sequence. Usually Hindu mythologies, epics and legendary dramas are chosen as themes.

A distinctive part of the Odissi tradition is the inclusion of Moksha (or Mokshya) finale in the performance sequence. This is the concluding item of a recital. Moksha in Hindu traditions means “spiritual liberation”. This dance movement traditionally attempts to convey a sense of spiritual release and soul liberation, soaring into the realm of pure aesthetics. Movement and pose merge in a fast pace pure dance climax.

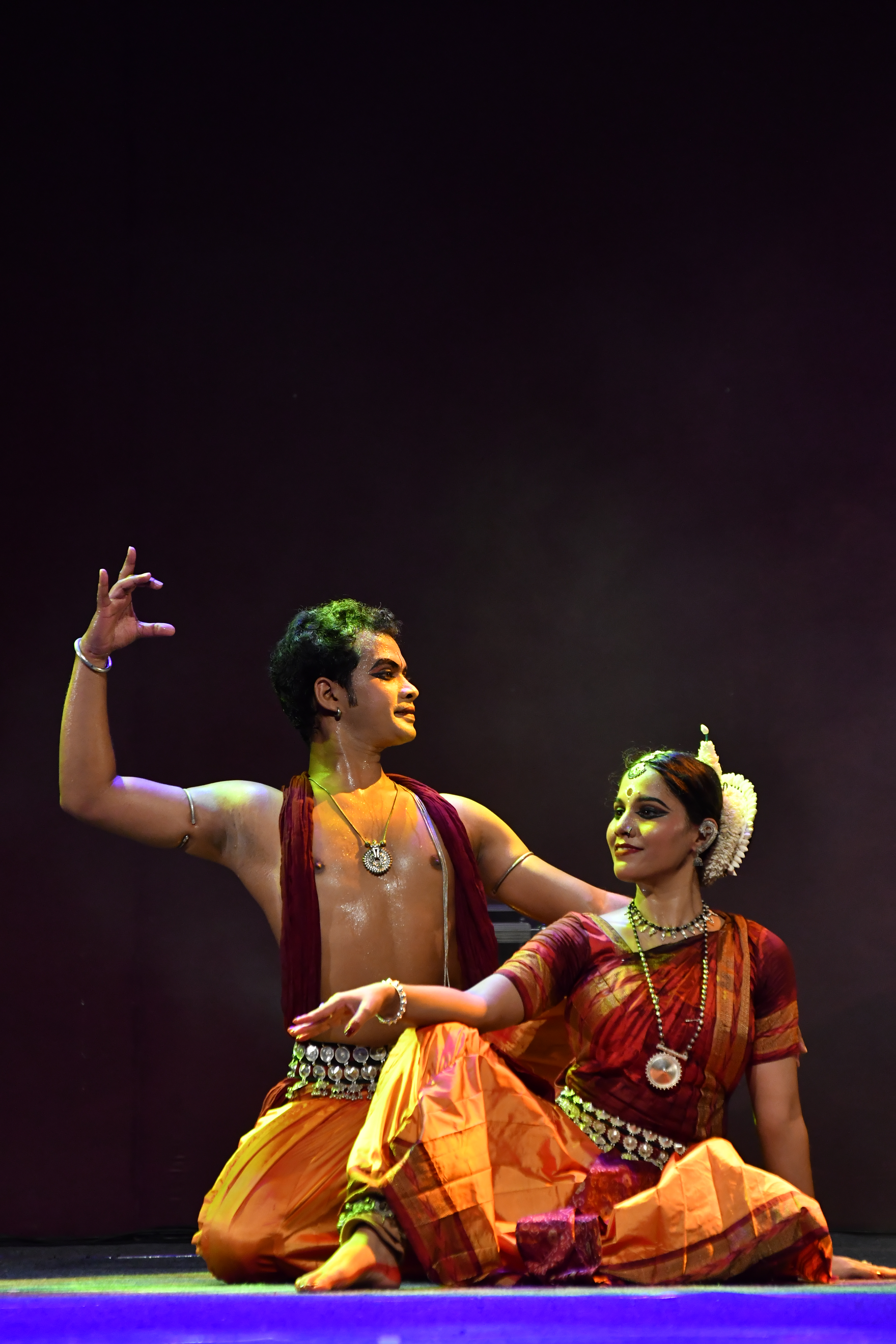
Odissi dance by Ananya parida and Rudraprasad Swain

=== Basic moves and mudras ===
Odissi mudra murals in Bhubaneswar

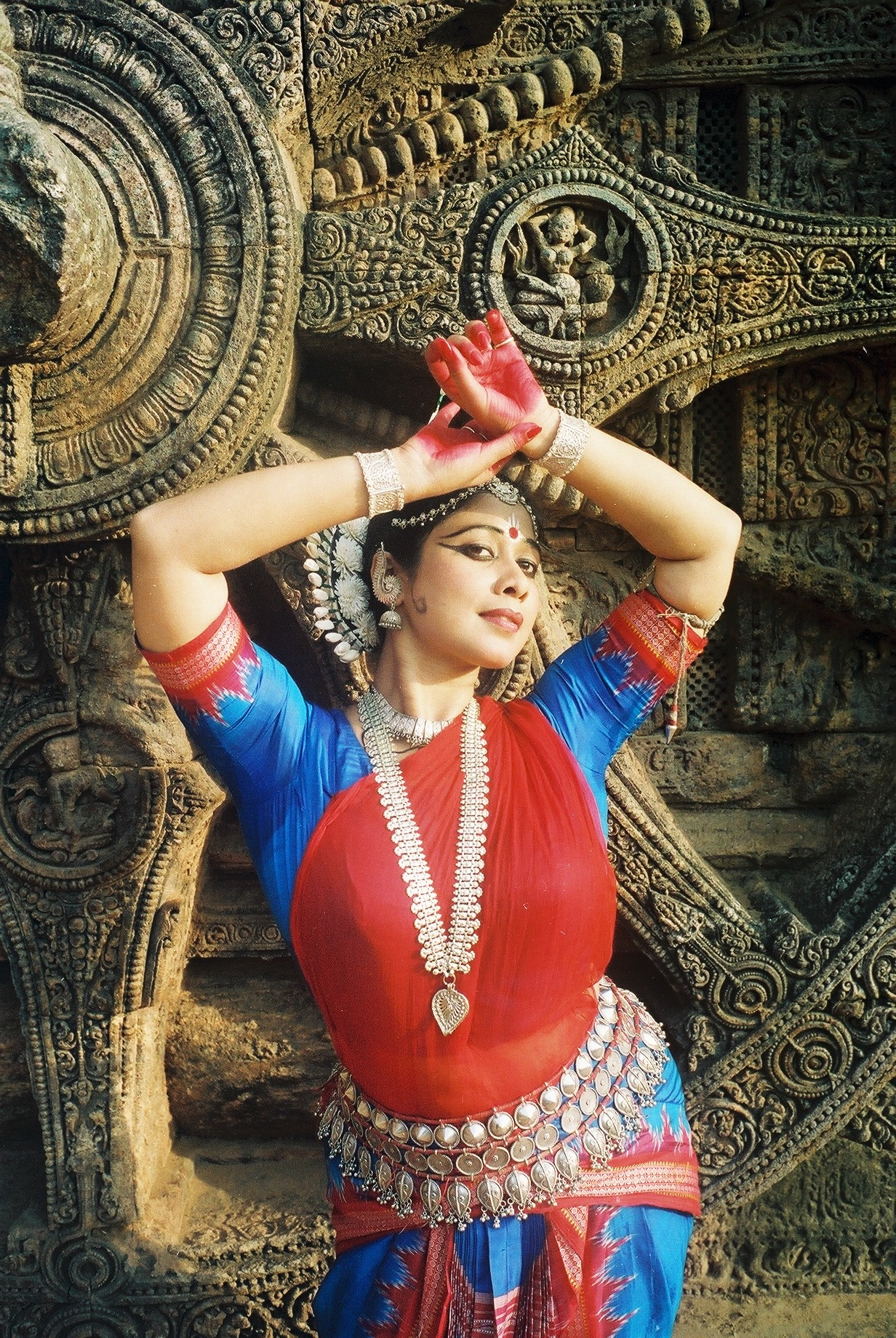
Odissi pose at Konark Sun Temple

The basic unit of Odissi are called bhangas. These are made up of eight belis, or body positions and movements, combined in many varieties. Motion is uthas (rising or up), baithas (sitting or down) or sthankas (standing). The gaits or movement on the dance floor is called chaalis, with movement tempo linked to emotions according to the classical Sanskrit texts. Thus, for example, burhas or quick pace suggest excitement, while a slow confused pace suggests dejection. For aesthetics, movement is centered on a core, a point in space or floor, and each dancer has her imaginary square of space, with spins and expression held within it. The foot movement or pada bhedas too have basic dance units, and Odissi has six of these, in contrast to four found in most classical Indian dances.

The three primary dance positions in Odissi are:

- Chouka – the square position, with weight equally placed on the two legs in a squatting position, spine straight, arms raised up with elbows bent.
- Abhanga – the body weight shifts to one foot, while the feet and knees are kept forward in a standing position, one hip extending sideways and torso deflected away from supporting leg.
- Tribhanga – is an S-shaped three-fold bending of body, with torso deflecting in one direction while the head and hips deflecting in the opposite direction of torso. Further, the hands and legs frame the body into a composite of two squares (rectangle), providing an aesthetic frame of reference. This is described in the ancient Sanskrit texts, and forms of it are found in other Hindu dance arts, but tribhanga postures developed most in and are distinctive to Odissi, and they are found in historic Hindu temple reliefs.

Mudras or Hastas are hand gestures which are used to express the meaning of a given act. Like all classical dances of India, the aim of Odissi is in part to convey emotions, mood and inner feelings in the story by appropriate hand and facial gestures. There are 63 Hastas in modern Odissi dance, and these have the same names or structure as those in the pan-Indian Hindu texts, but most closely matching those in the Abhinaya Chandrika. These are subdivided into three, according to the traditional texts:

- Asamyukta Hasta – Single hand Mudras – 28 Prakar (gestures, for instance to communicate a salute, prayer, embrace, energy, bond, swing, carriage, shell, arrow, holding a thing, wheel, and so on.)
- Samyukta Hasta – Double hand Mudras – 24 Prakar (gestures, for instance to indicate a flag, flower, type of bird or animal, moon, action like grasping, and so on.)
- Nritya Hasta – “Pure Dance” Mudras

The Mudra system is derived from the "Abhinaya Darpana" by Nandikeshavara and the ancient Natya Shastra of Bharata Muni.

=== Costumes ===
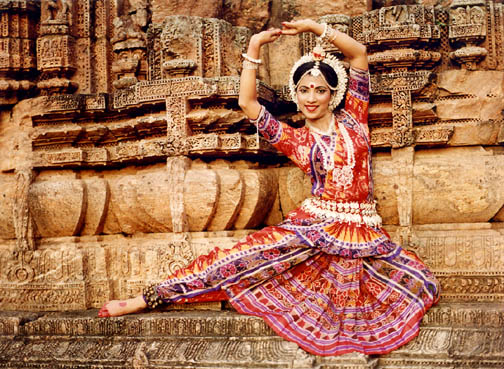
The Odissi costume

The Odissi dancers are colorfully dressed with makeup and jewellery. The sari worn by Odissi dancers are brightly coloured, and usually of local silk (Pattasari). It is worn with pleats, or may have a pleat tailor stitched in front, to allow maximum flexibility during the footwork. These saris have traditional prints of Odisha with regional designs and embellishments, and may be the Sambalpuri sari and Bomkai sari.

The jewellery includes silver pieces, a metal favored in regional tradition. The hair is tied up, and typically drawn into an elaborate bun resembling a Hindu temple spire, and decorated with seenthi. The hairstyle may contain a moon shaped crest of white flowers, or a reed crown called mukoot with peacock feathers (symbolism for Krishna). The dancers forehead is marked with tikka, and adorned with various jewelry such as the allaka (head piece on which the tikka hangs). The eyes are ringed with kajal (black eyeliner).

Ear covers called kapa or ear rings decorate the sides of the head, while necklace adorns the neck. The dancer wears a pair of armlets also called bahichudi or bajuband, on the upper arm. The wrist is covered with kankana (bangles). At the waist they wear an elaborate belt which ties down one end of the sari. The ankles are decorated with a leather piece on top of which are bells (ghungroo). The dancer's palms and soles may be painted with red coloured dye called the alta.

Modern Odissi male performers wear dhoti – a broadcloth tied around waist, pleated for movement, and tucked between legs; usually extends to knee or lower. Upper body is bare chested, and a long thin folded translucent sheet wrapping over one shoulder and usually tucked below a wide belt.

=== Music and instruments ===
Odissi dance is accompanied by the traditional classical music of the state of Odisha, Odissi music. Rooted in the ancient ritual music tradition dedicated to Lord Jagannatha, Odissi music has a rich history spanning over two thousand years, distinguished by its unique sangita-shastras (musical treatises), a specialized system of Ragas and Talas, and a distinctive style of performance characterised by the andolita gamaka. The primary Odissi mela ragas are Kalyana, Nata, Sri, Baradi, Gouri, Panchama, Dhanasri, Karnata, Bhairabi and Sokabaradi.

Odissi dance, states Ragini Devi, is a form of "visualized music", wherein the Ragas and Raginis, respectively the primary and secondary musical modes, are integrated by the musicians and interpreted through the dancer. Each note is a means, has a purpose and with a mood in classical Indian music, which Odissi accompanies to express sentiments in a song through Parija. This is true whether the performance is formal, or less formal as in Nartana and Natangi used during festive occasions and the folksy celebration of life.

Like most Indian dance forms, an Odissi troupe performs with the accompaniment of a musical ensemble. The mini-orchestra consists of a number of instruments, often varying slightly by region; the ubiquitous tanpura is used for a consistent, droning ambience throughout, with the mardala for percussion. Melodic instruments range from the harmonium, bansuri (bamboo flute) or sarangi to the sitar and violin. Additionally, manjira (finger cymbals) or other small, percussive instruments may be used. At times, vocalists may be featured, usually singing simple, rhythmic phrases and melodies with dancing specifically choreographed to match.

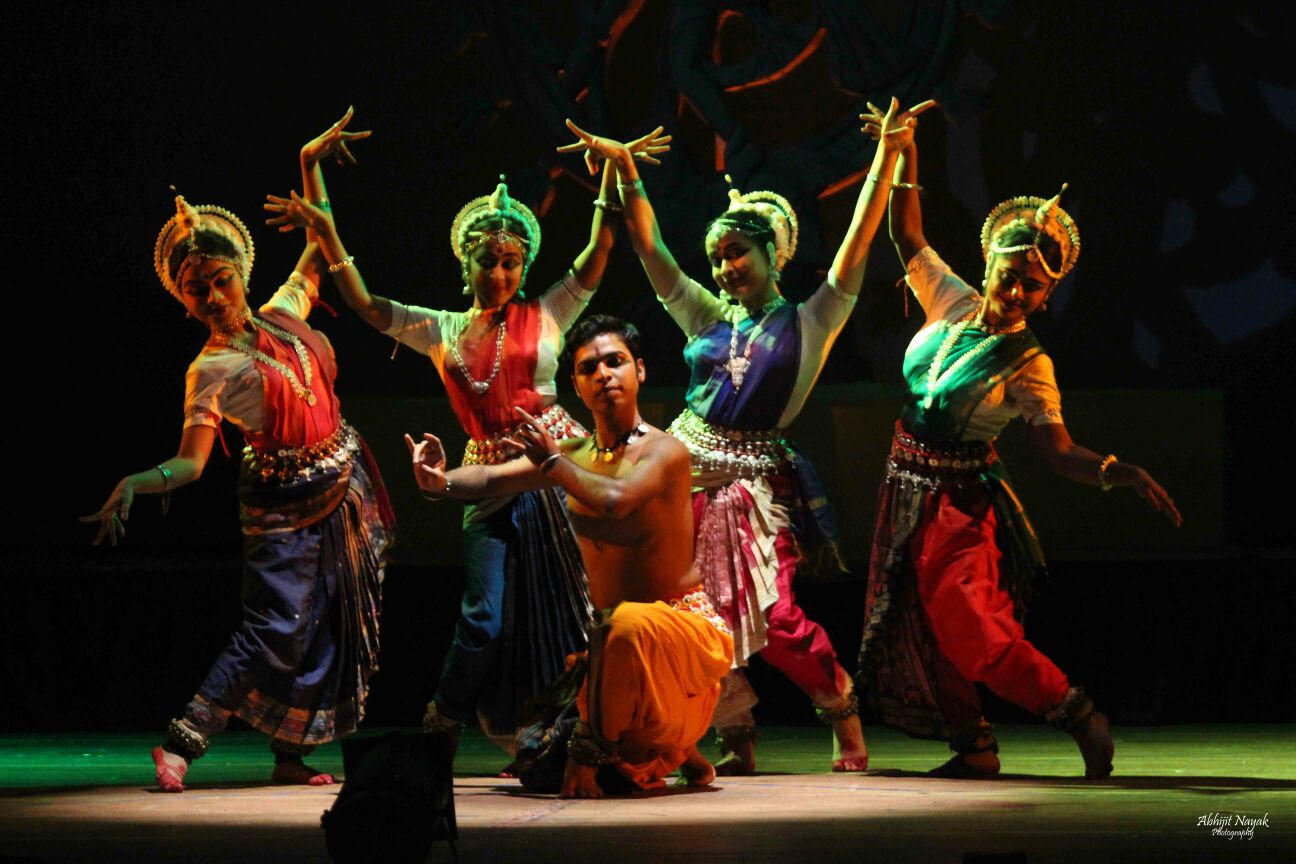
Odissi group performance

=== Styles ===
The Odissi tradition existed in three schools: Mahari, Nartaki, and Gotipua:

- Maharis were Odia devadasis or temple girls, their name deriving from Maha (great) and Nari (girl), or Mahri (chosen) particularly those at the temple of Jagganath at Puri. Early Maharis performed Nritta (pure dance) and Abhinaya (interpretation of poetry) dedicated to various Hindu gods and goddesses, as well as Puranic mythologies and Vedic legends. Later, Maharis especially performed dance sequences based on the lyrics of Jayadev's Gita Govinda. This style is more sensuous and closer to the classical Sanskrit texts on dance, music and performance arts.
- Gotipuas were boys dressed up as girls and taught the dance by the Maharis. This style included martial arts, athletics and acrobatics. Gotipuas danced to these compositions outside the temples and fairgrounds as folksy entertainment.
- Nartaki dance took place in the royal courts, where it was prevalent before the British period.

== Schools, training and recognition ==
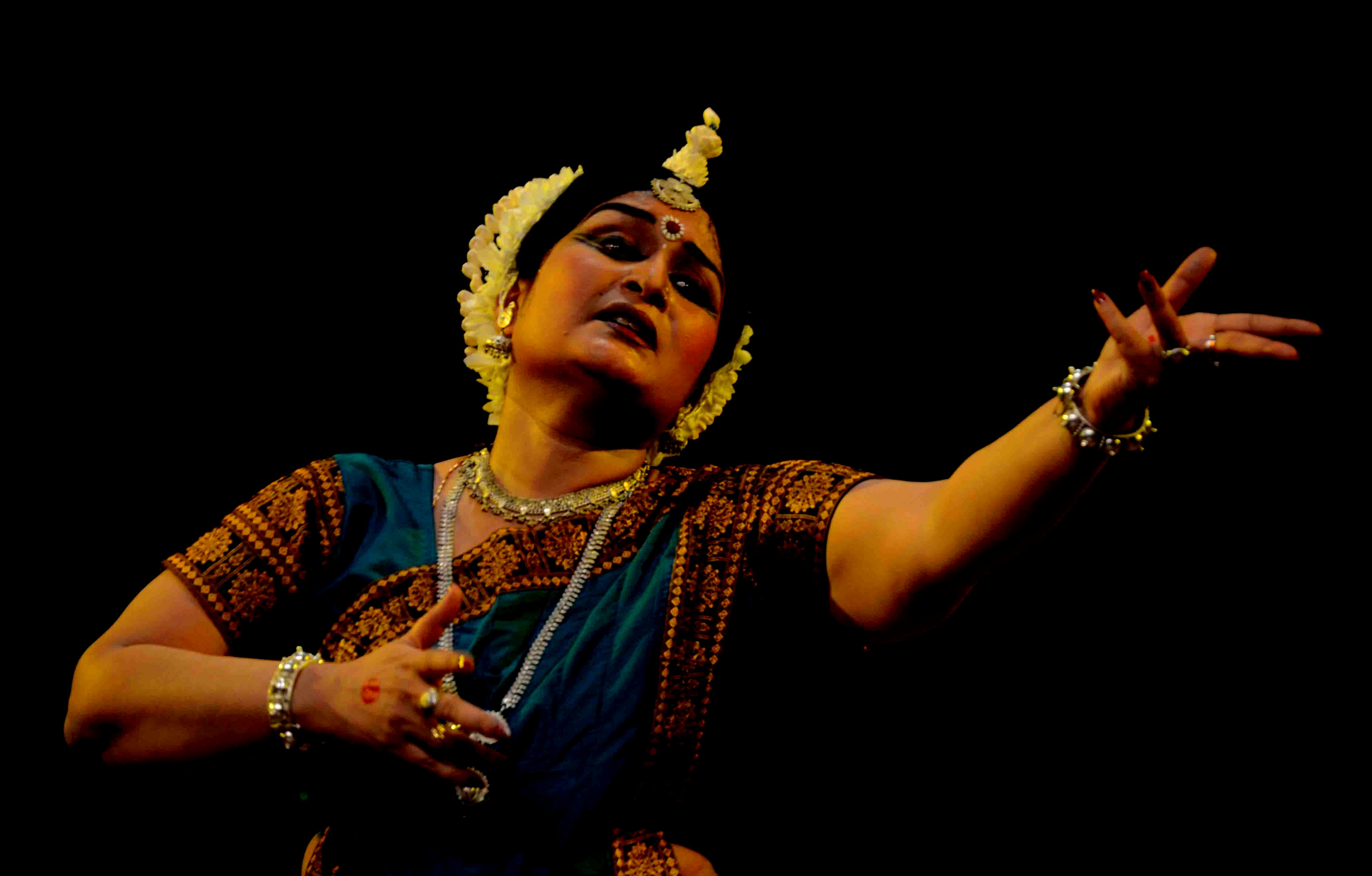
The performer is in an Odissi Dance Abhinaya, based on the popular Indian epic-Ramayan

=== Odissi maestros and performers ===
Kelucharan Mohapatra, Pankaj Charan Das, Deba Prasad Das and Raghunath Dutta were the four major gurus who revived Odissi in the late forties and early fifties. Sanjukta Panigrahi was a leading disciple of Kelucharan Mohapatra who popularized Odissi by performing in India and abroad. In the mid-sixties, three other disciples of Kelucharan Mohapatra, Kumkum Mohanty and Sonal Mansingh, were known for their performances in India and abroad. Some other notable disciples include, Debi Basu, Jhelum Paranjape, Shubhada Varadkar, Daksha Mashruwala and Nandita Behera. Laximipriya Mohapatra performed a piece of Odissi abhinaya in the Annapurna Theatre in Cuttack in 1948, a show upheld as the first classical Odissi dance performance after its contemporary revival. Guru Mayadhar Raut played a pivotal role in giving Odissi dance its classical status. He introduced Mudra Vinyoga in 1955 and Sancharibhava in the Odissi dance items, and portrayed Shringara Rasa in Gita Govinda Ashthapadis. His notable compositions include Pashyati Dishi Dishi and Priya Charu Shile, composed in 1961.

== Schools ==
=== IIT Bhubaneswar ===
Odissi has been included in Indian Institute of Technology Bhubaneswar's BTech syllabus since 2015 as the first Indian national technical institute to introduce any classical dance in syllabus.

=== In Guinness World records ===
Guinness World Records has acknowledged the feat of the largest congregation of Odissi dancers in a single event. 555 Odissi dancers performed at the event hosted on 23 December 2011, in the Kalinga stadium, Bhubaneswar, Odisha. The dancers performed the mangalacharana, Battu, Pallavi, Abhinaya and Mokshya dance items from the Odissi repertoire.

More than 1000 Odissi dancers performed at the World Cultural Festival 12 March 2016. This is till date the largest congregation of Odissi dancers in a single event.

=== Odissi Centre at Oxford University ===
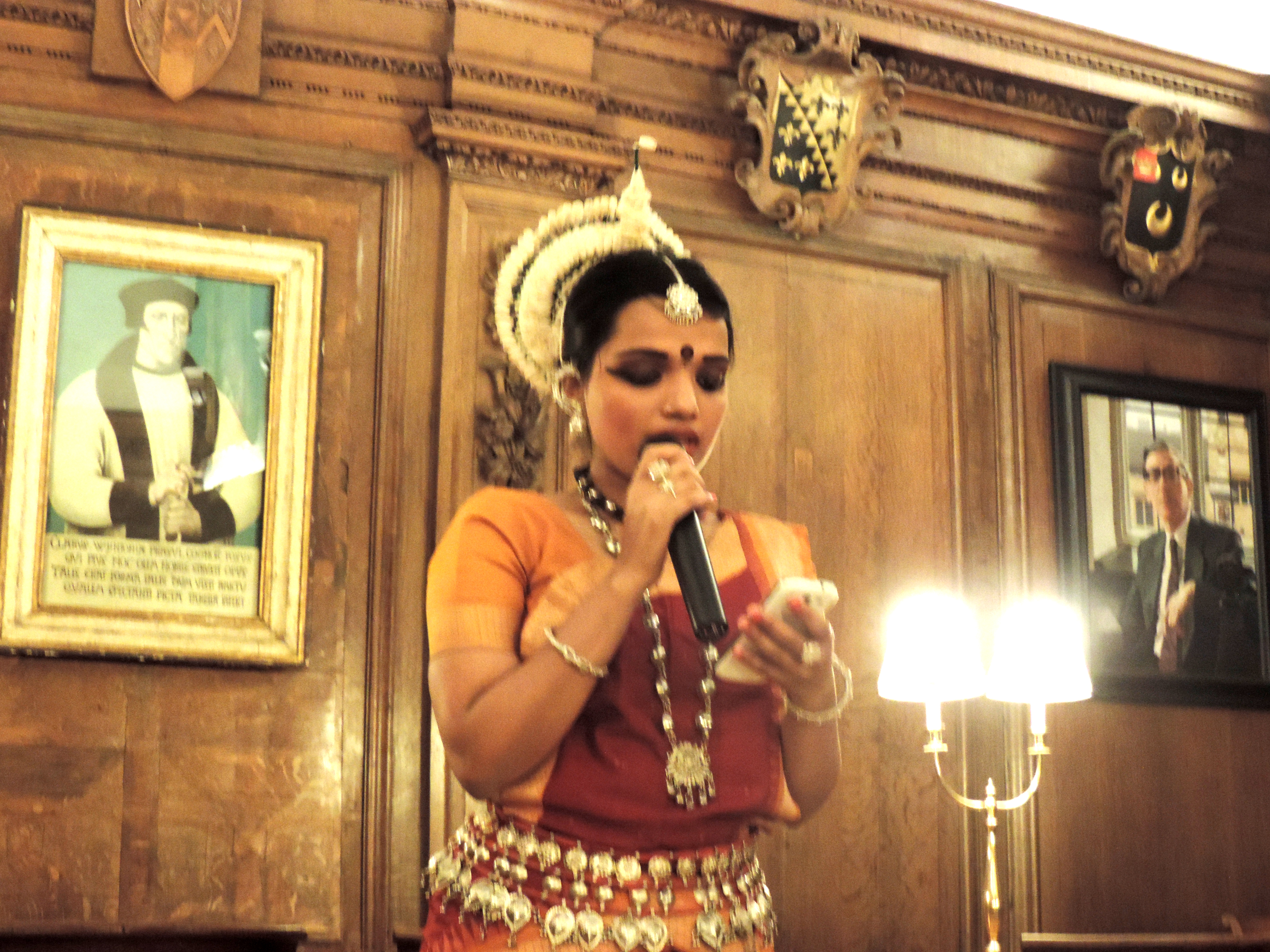
Baisali Mohanty announcing the Oxford Odissi Centre.

An Odissi dance centre has been opened from January 2016, at the University of Oxford. Known as Oxford Odissi Centre, it is an initiative of the Odissi dancer and choreographer Baisali Mohanty who is also a post-graduate scholar at the University of Oxford.

Beside holding regular Odissi dance classes at its institution, the Oxford Odissi Centre also conducts Odissi dance workshops at other academic institutions in the United Kingdom.

== See also ==
- Indian classical dance
- Ghungroo
- Odissi music
- Gotipua
