= Sri (Odissi raga) =

Rāga of the tradition of Odissi music

- Odia script: ଗୁଜ୍ଜରୀ
- Melā: Sri
- Jati: Oudaba - Sampurna
- Badi: Rusabha
- Sambadi: Panchama
- Anga Ragas: Dhanasri, Bangalasri, Karunasri, Malasri, Madhusri, Dakhinasri
- Allied Ragas: Abhiri

Sri (Odia: ଶ୍ରୀ ରାଗ, romanized: śrī rāga, also spelled Shri & Shree) is a rāga belonging to the tradition of Odissi music. Falling under the meḷa of the same name, the raga uses komala nisada swara and is traditionally associated with the melancholic karuna rasa. The raga is mentioned in treatises such as the Gita Prakasa and Sangita Narayana. Among its angaragas, Dhanasri, Bangalasri, Karunasri, Malasri, Madhusri, Dakhinasri are well-known.

== Structure ==
An ancient raga, Sri has been used by hundreds of poet-composers for well-over the past many centuries. Its aroha-abaroha are given below :

Aroha : S R M P n S

Abaroha : S n D P M G R S

The raga dwells or does nyasa on the rusabha, as per tradition. Sri is also a prominent raga in the Carnatic music tradition.

== Compositions ==
Some of the well-known traditional compositions in this raga include :

- Syama Pritire Sajani by Dinakrusna Dasa
- Kaha Ki Upaya Aau by Benudhara
- Jaa Jaa Tu Chhuan Na by Gopalakrusna
