= Ramakeri =

Rāga of the tradition of Odissi music

- Odia script: ରାମକେରୀ
- Melā: Baradi
- Jati: Oudaba - Sampurna
- Badi: Panchama
- Sambadi: Sadaja
- Allied Ragas: Baradi

Ramakeri (Odia: ରାମକେରୀ, romanized: rāmakeri) is a rāga belonging to the tradition of Odissi music. Falling under the meḷa Barādi, the raga uses komala rusabha, komala dhaibata and tibra madhyama swaras and is traditionally associated with the karuṇa rasa. The raga is mentioned in treatises such as the Gita Prakasa and Sangita Narayana. This raga has been used by the 12th-century Odia composer Jayadeva in his Gita Govinda.

== Structure ==
An ancient raga, Ramakeri has been used by hundreds of poet-composers for well-over the past many centuries. Its aroha-abaroha are given below :

Aroha : S r G P d S

Abaroha : S N d P m G r S

The raga dwells or does nyasa on the gandhara, as per tradition and evokes a solemn mood.

== Compositions ==
Some of the well-known traditional compositions in this raga include :

- Kuru Yadunandana (24th prabandha of the Gita Govinda) by Jayadeva
- Syame Tu Nuha Bimana by Banamali Dasa
