= Gujjari =

Rāga of the tradition of Odissi music

- Odia script: ଗୁଜ୍ଜରୀ
- Melā: Karnāta
- Jati: Sampurna - Sampurna
- Badi: Panchama
- Sambadi: Sadaja
- Anga Ragas: Mangala Gujjari
- Allied Ragas: Abhiri

Gujjari (Odia: ଗୁଜ୍ଜରୀ, romanized: gujjari) is a rāga belonging to the tradition of Odissi music. Falling under the meḷa Karnāta, the raga uses komala gandhara, komala dhaibata and komala nisada swaras and is traditionally associated with the karuṇa rasa. The raga is mentioned in treatises such as the Gita Prakasa and Sangita Narayana. Among its angaragas, Mangala Gujjari is most prominent and has been used by Jayadeva in his Gita Govinda, alongside Gujjari itself.

== Structure ==
An ancient raga, Gujjari has been used by hundreds of poet-composers for well-over the past many centuries. Its aroha-abaroha are given below :

Aroha : S R g M P d n S

Abaroha : S n d P M g R S

The raga dwells or does nyasa on the rusabha, as per tradition.

== Compositions ==
Some of the well-known traditional compositions in this raga include :

- Syama Nagara Pari by Banamali Dasa
