= Kedara Kamodi =

Rāga of the tradition of Odissi music

- Odia script: କେଦାର କାମୋଦୀ
- Melā: Sri
- Jati: Bakra Sampurna - Sampurna
- Badi: Rusabha
- Sambadi: Panchama
- Allied Ragas: Kedara, Kamodi, Kedaragouda

Kedara Kamodi (Odia: କେଦାର କାମୋଦୀ, romanized: kedāra kāmodi) is a rāga belonging to the tradition of Odissi music. Falling under the meḷa Sri, the raga uses both nisada swaras and is traditionally associated with the srungāra rasa. This raga is considered a conjunct of the rāgas Kedāra and Kamodi. The raga has been used by most of the famous composers including Kabi Samrata Upendra Bhanja and Kabisurjya Baladeba Ratha.

== Structure ==
An ancient raga, Kedara Kamodi has been used by hundreds of poet-composers for well-over the past many centuries. The raga is bakra in its aroha and abaroha (ascent and descent). Its aroha-abaroha are given below :

Aroha : S M G R, G M P D n D P, P N S

Abaroha : S n D P M G R S

The raga exhibits Kedarānga in its SMGM and PNS, whereas PDSnDP and GMPDnDP evoke the Kamodi anga.

== Compositions ==
Some of the well-known traditional compositions in this raga include :

- Khyamanukampadhara He (Champu) by Kabisurjya Baladeba Ratha
- Ramanibara Asuchi Kari Bhangi (Rasa Panchaka) by Kabi Samrata Upendra Bhanja
- Jebe Nabaghana Syama Bansiswana by Kabisurjya Baladeba Ratha
