= Kedaragouda =

Rāga of the tradition of Odissi music

- Odia script: କେଦାରଗୌଡ଼ା
- Melā: Sri
- Jati: Bakra Sadaba - Sampurna
- Badi: Rusabha
- Sambadi: Panchama
- Allied Ragas: Gouda

Kedaragouda (Odia: କେଦାରଗୌଡ଼ା, romanized: kedāragouḍā) is a rāga belonging to the tradition of Odissi music. Falling under the meḷa Sri, the raga uses both nisada swaras and is traditionally associated with the srungāra rasa. This raga is considered a conjunct of the rāgas Kedāra and Goudā. The raga is mentioned in treatises such as the Gita Prakasa and Sangita Narayana. The most famous song in this raga is from the Kisorachandrananda Champu, a composition of Kabisurjya Baladeba Ratha.

== Structure ==
An ancient raga, Kedaragouda has been used by hundreds of poet-composers for well-over the past many centuries. The raga is bakra sadaba or devious-hexatonic in its aroha and sampurna or heptatonic in its abaroha (ascent and descent). Its aroha-abaroha are given below :

Aroha : S R M P D n D P N S

Abaroha : S n D P M G R S

The raga dwells or does nyasa on the rusabha, as per tradition and evokes a solemn mood.

== Compositions ==
Some of the well-known traditional compositions in this raga include :

- Bhangi Chahan (Champu) by Kabisurjya Baladeba Ratha
- Jhuluchanti Nikunja Kanane (Jhulana Jatra Prabandha) by Janardana Sandha Nrupati
- Chatara To Gala Keniki Go by Banamali Dasa
