= Madhukiri =

Rāga of the tradition of Odissi music

- Odia script: ମଧୁକିରୀ
- Melā: Sri
- Jati: Sadaba - Sadaba
- Badi: Dhaibata
- Sambadi: Rusabha

Madhukiri (Odia: ମଧୁକିରୀ, romanized: madhukirī, alternatively spelled madhukeri) is a rāga belonging to the tradition of Odissi music. Falling under the meḷa Sri, the raga uses komala nisada and is traditionally associated with the karuṇa rasa. The raga is mentioned in treatises such as the Gita Prakasa and Sangita Narayana.

== Structure ==
An ancient raga, Madhukiri has been used by hundreds of poet-composers for well-over the past many centuries. The raga is sadaba or hexatonic in its aroha and abaroha (ascent and descent). Its aroha-abaroha are given below :

Aroha : S R M P D n S

Abaroha : S n D P M R S

The raga dwells or does nyasa on the dhaibata, as per tradition and evokes a melancholic mood. It is uttaranga-pradhana, that is, moves more in the higher part of the pitch scale. It is sung in the third prahara of the night.

== Compositions ==
Some of the well-known traditional compositions in this raga include :

- Ago Duti Syama Priti by Pankaja
- Gati Mora Nanda Nandana, archaic composition
