= Ghantaraba =

Rāga of the tradition of Odissi music

- Odia script: ଘଣ୍ଟାରବ
- Melā: Karnata
- Jati: Sampurna - Sampurna
- Badi: Sadaja
- Sambadi: Madhyama

Ghantaraba (Odia: ଘଣ୍ଟାରବ, romanized: ghaṇṭāraba) is a rāga belonging to the tradition of Odissi music. Falling under the meḷa Bhairabi, the raga uses komala rusabha, komala gandhara, komala dhaibata and komala nisada swaras and is traditionally associated with the vira rasa. The raga is mentioned in treatises such as the Gita Prakasa and Sangita Narayana.

== Structure ==
An ancient raga, Ghantaraba has been used by hundreds of poet-composers for well-over the past many centuries. The raga is sadaba-bakrasampurna or hexatonic in its aroha and crooked-heptatonic in its abaroha (ascent and descent). Its aroha-abaroha are given below:

Aroha: S r g M d n S

Abaroha: S n d P d M g r S

The raga dwells or does nyasa on the madhyama and dhaibata as per tradition and evokes a virile mood. The pairing of these two notes forms a characteristic feature of the raga. It is sung in the third prahara of the night.

== Compositions ==
Some of the well-known traditional compositions in this raga include:

- Kaha Sahi Kahin Pain, archaic composition
- Are Debagana Karuchi Mun Pana by Baisnaba Pani
