= Debakiri =

Rāga of the tradition of Odissi music

- Odia script: ଦେବକିରୀ
- Melā: Dhanasri
- Jati: Sampurna - Sampurna
- Badi: Panchama
- Sambadi: Sadaja

Debakiri (Odia: ଦେବକିରୀ, romanized: debakirī) is a rāga belonging to the tradition of Odissi music. Falling under the meḷa Dhanasri, the raga uses komala gandhara and komala nisada swaras and is traditionally associated with the karuṇa and bhakti rasas. The raga is mentioned in treatises such as the Gita Prakasa and Sangita Narayana.

== Structure ==
An ancient raga, Debakiri has been used by hundreds of poet-composers for well-over the past many centuries. The raga is sampurna or heptatonic in its aroha and abaroha (ascent and descent). Its aroha-abaroha are given below :

Aroha : S R g M P D n P S

Abaroha : S n D P M g R S

The raga dwells or does nyasa on the panchama, as per tradition and evokes a melancholic mood.

== Compositions ==
Some of the well-known traditional compositions in this raga include :

- Mo Chitta Chora, Sangini Re by Benudhara
- Prana Sahi Re by Benudhara
