= Sokabaradi =

Rāga of the tradition of Odissi music

- Odia script: ଶୋକବରାଡ଼ି
- Melā: Sokabaradi
- Jati: Sampurna - Sampurna
- Badi: Gandhara
- Sambadi: Nisada

Sokabaradi (Odia: ଶୋକବରାଡ଼ି, romanized: sokabarādi) is a rāga belonging to the tradition of Odissi music. Falling under the meḷa of the same name, the raga uses komala rusabha, komala dhaibata, komala nisada and tibra madhyama swaras and is traditionally associated with the karuṇa rasa. The raga is mentioned in treatises such as the Gita Prakasa and Sangita Narayana.

== Structure ==
An ancient raga, Sokabaradi has been used by hundreds of poet-composers for well-over the past many centuries. The raga is sampurna or heptatonic in its aroha and abaroha (ascent and descent). Its aroha-abaroha are given below :

Aroha : S r g m P d N S

Abaroha : S N d P m g r S

The raga dwells or does nyasa on the gandhara, as per tradition and evokes a solemn mood.

== Compositions ==
Some of the well-known traditional compositions in this raga include :

- Padi Bhramare, Budigalu Syama Premare by Gopalakrusna Pattanayaka
