= Abhiri =

Rāga of the tradition of Odissi music

- Odia script: ଆଭୀରୀ
- Melā: Karnāta
- Jati: Sadaba - Sadaba
- Badi: Panchama
- Sambadi: Sadaja
- Allied Ragas: Gujjari

Abhiri (Odia: ଆଭୀରୀ, romanized: ābhīrī) is a rāga belonging to the tradition of Odissi music. Falling under the meḷa Karnāta, the raga uses komala gandhara, komala dhaibata and komala nisada swaras and is traditionally associated with the karuṇa rasa. The raga is mentioned in treatises such as the Gita Prakasa and Sangita Narayana.

== Structure ==
An ancient raga, Abhiri has been used by hundreds of poet-composers for well-over the past many centuries. It is sadaba or hexatonic and its aroha-abaroha are given below :

Aroha : S g M P d n S

Abaroha : S n d P M g S

== Compositions ==
Some of the well-known traditional compositions in this raga include :

- Mita Ana Go (ମୀତ ଆଣ ଗୋ) by Benudhara
- Kisori Go Tu Ta Nutana Bali by Benudhara
