= Panchama Baradi =

Rāga of the tradition of Odissi music

- Odia script: ପଞ୍ଚମ ବରାଡ଼ି
- Melā: Panchama Baradi
- Jati: Bakra Sampurna
- Badi: Panchama
- Sambadi: Sadaja

Panchama Baradi (Odia: ପଞ୍ଚମ ବରାଡ଼ି, romanized: panchama barādi) is a rāga belonging to the tradition of Odissi music. Falling under the meḷa of the same name, the raga uses all twelve swaras and is traditionally associated with the karuṇa rasa. It is said to be a composite of the ragas Panchama and Baradi.

== Structure ==
An ancient raga, Panchama Baradi has been used by hundreds of poet-composers for well-over the past many centuries. The raga is sampurna or heptatonic in its aroha and abaroha (ascent and descent). Its aroha-abaroha are bakra or nonlinear.

The raga dwells or does nyasa on the gandhara, as per tradition and evokes a solemn mood.

== Compositions ==
Some of the well-known traditional compositions in this raga include :

- Are Babu Syamaghana by Bhakta Charana Dasa
- Chahin Chahin To Sarani by Kabisurjya Baladeba Ratha
