= Debagandhari =

Rāga of the tradition of Odissi music

- Odia script: ଦେବଗାନ୍ଧାରୀ
- Melā: Debagandhari
- Jati: Sampurna - Sampurna
- Badi: Sadaja
- Sambadi: Panchama

Debagandhari (Odia: ଦେବଗାନ୍ଧାରୀ, romanized: debagāndhāri) is a rāga belonging to the tradition of Odissi music. Falling under the meḷa of the same name, the raga uses komala dhaibata and is traditionally associated with the karuṇa rasa.

== Structure ==
The raga is sampurna or heptatonic in its aroha and abaroha (ascent and descent). Its aroha-abaroha are given below :

Aroha : S R G M P d N S

Abaroha : S N d P M G R S

The raga dwells or does nyasa on the panchama, as per tradition and evokes a pensive mood.

== Compositions ==
Some of the well-known traditional compositions in this raga include :

- Jaa Re Jaa, Brajaraja Nagare Tu Jaa by Lokanath Pattanayaka
- Pranabandhua Aja To Anauni Nua by Kabisurjya Baladeba Ratha
