= Dhanasri =

Classical Indian song

- Odia script: ଧନାଶ୍ରୀ
- Melā: Dhanasri
- Jati: Oudaba - Sampurna
- Badi: Panchama
- Sambadi: Sadaja
- Anga Ragas: Mangala Dhanasri
- Allied Ragas: Gundakiri

Dhanasri (Odia: ଧନାଶ୍ରୀ, romanized: dhanāsri) is a rāga belonging to the tradition of Odissi music. Falling under the meḷa of the same name, the raga uses komala gandhara and komala nisada swaras and is traditionally associated with the karuṇa rasa. The raga is mentioned in treatises such as the Gita Prakasa and Sangita Narayana.

== Structure ==
An ancient raga, Dhanasri is accepted as one of the primary melas in Odissi music due to its prominence. It has been used by hundreds of poet-composers for well-over the past many centuries. Its aroha-abaroha are given below :

Aroha : n S g M P n S

Abaroha : S n D P M g R S

== Compositions ==
Some of the well-known traditional compositions in this raga include :

- Sariba Ki E Nisi Go by Banamali Dasa
- Kanta Bina Diba Rajani by Upendra Bhanja
- Kadamba Bane Bansi Bajila by Gopalakrusna Pattanayaka
- Gostha Chandramanku Asa by Gopalakrusna Pattanayaka
- Ke Ki Kahi Ki Bigidaila by Gopalakrusna Pattanayaka
- Kunchita Nila Kuntala by Benudhara
