= Baradi =

Raga of Odissi music

- Odia script: ବରାଡ଼ି
- Melā: Baradi
- Jati: Sampurna - Sampurna
- Badi: Gandhara
- Sambadi: Nisada
- Anga Ragas: Desa Baradi, Mangala Baradi
- Allied Ragas: Ramakeri

Baradi (Odia: ବରାଡ଼ି, romanized: barādi) is a rāga belonging to the tradition of Odissi music. Falling under the meḷa Barādi, the raga uses komala rusabha, komala dhaibata and tibra madhyama swaras and is traditionally associated with the karuṇa rasa. The raga is mentioned in treatises such as the Gita Prakasa and Sangita Narayana. This raga has been used by the 12th-century Odia composer Jayadeva in his Gita Govinda along with its angaraga Desa Barādi.

== Structure ==
An ancient raga, Baradi has been used by hundreds of poet-composers for well-over the past many centuries. The raga is sampurna or heptatonic in its aroha and abaroha (ascent and descent). Its aroha-abaroha are given below :

Aroha : S r G M P d N S

Abaroha : S N d P M G r S

The raga dwells or does nyasa on the gandhara, as per tradition and evokes a solemn mood (ପବିତ୍ର ପରିବେଶ).

== Compositions ==
Some of the well-known traditional compositions in this raga include :

- Sajani Tora Dharuchi Kara by Banamali Dasa
- Manasija Mana Mohana by Gopalakrusna Pattanayaka
