= Jandhyala (surname) =

Jandhyala (Telugu: జంధ్యాల) is a Telugu surname. Notable people with the surname include:

- Jandhyala (1951–2001), Telugu writer and film director
- Jandhyala Papayya Sastry (1912–1992), veteran Telugu poet
