= Cardiff Mela =

Multicultural festival in Cardiff, Wales

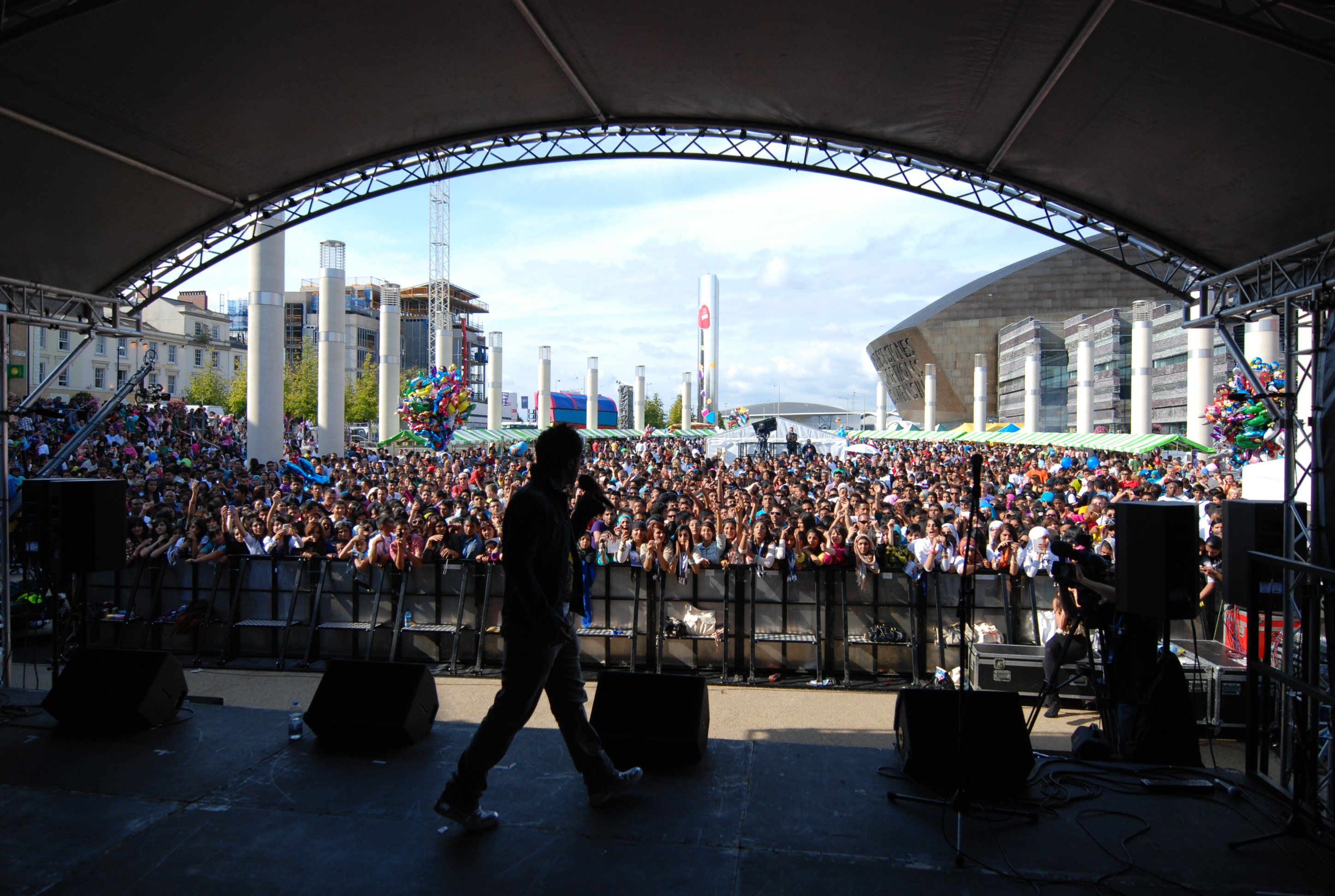
Cardiff Mela

The Cardiff Mela (also known as the Cardiff Multicultural Mela) is an annual large-scale outdoor multicultural festival, held in the city's Roald Dahl Plass, in Cardiff Bay. It is a free event and has been free each year since inception. It celebrates many cultural aspects of Asian life, particularly music, dance, fashion and food. The annual event first took place on an outdoor location in 2007 at Coopers Field, Cardiff Castle in the heart of Cardiff City Centre. The 2009 festival featured bhangra, Bollywood and rnb singers including H Dhami, Mumzy Stranger and Navin Kundra amongst others. The 2010 event attracted over 30,000 visitors and featured a performance from Bombay Rockers.

The Cardiff Mela is also part of Cardiff Festivals which is a series of events that include live music, street theatre, open-air theatre, children’s entertainment and funfairs. Cardiff Festival provides a mix of popular, well-established and new events that take place in the city centre and around Cardiff Bay.

The Mela was founded by Imran Iqbal who is currently the event's artistic director and coordinator.

The Cardiff Mela is one of the UK's longest running mela festivals.

== 2006 Event ==
The inaugural Cardiff Mela took place in Roath Park on Sunday 28th May 2006 with a small number of local vendors and performers.

== 2007 Event ==
The 2007 Cardiff Mela took place in Coopers Field on Sunday 29th July 2007 with headline performance from the Sona Family.

== 2008 Event ==
The 2008 Cardiff Mela took place at the Roald Dahl Plass on Sunday 29th June 2008 with headline performance from Imran Khan (singer).

== 2009 Event ==
The 2009 Cardiff Mela took place at the Roald Dahl Plass on Sunday 9th August 2009 with headline performance from H Dhami.

== 2010 Event ==
The 2010 event took place on Sunday 8th August 2010 and featured performances from Stereo Nation & Bombay Rockers. In 2010, the Mela was part of a special national partnership entitled 'Planes, Trains and Rickshaws' which saw the two performers start their day in Cardiff Bay, followed by a trip down the M4 to the London Mela, then flying north to end their journey on the Edinburgh Mela stage, performing at all three events in the same day. The event itself was headlined by the Bombay Rockers and Imran Khan, however Imran Khan was unable to perform due to ill health.

== 2011 Event ==
The 2011 event took place on Sunday 24th July 2011 and featured performances from Stereo Nation, Mumzy Stranger, Jernade Miah, Mohammed Uzzal miah Panjabi by Nature, Panjabi Hit Squad, Junai Kaden, Juz D. The event was hosted by Tommy Sandhu and Noreen Khan from the BBC Asian Network.

== 2012 Event ==
The 2012 event took place on Sunday 15th July 2012. Artists who performed at the event included Imran Khan (singer), H Dhami, Jassi Sidhu & Apache Indian.

== 2013 Event ==
The 2013 event took place on Sunday 30th June 2013. Artists who performed at the event included Juggy D & Jaz Dhami.

== 2014 Event ==
The 2014 event took place on Sunday 14th September 2014. Artists who performed at the event included Lehmber Hussainpuri & Team PBN.

== 2015 - 2018 Event ==
The event did not go ahead these years due to non availability of funding and non availability of venue.

== 2019 Event ==
The 2019 event took place on Sunday 15th September 2019. Headline artists included H Dhami, Koomz, Bambi Bains & Jay Kadn.

== 2020 - 21 Event ==
The 2020 and 2021 event was cancelled due to Covid 19.

== 2022 Event ==
The 2022 took place on Sunday 18th September 2022. Headline artists included Raf Saperra, Liilz, Metz & Trix, Dj Kizzi & Panjabi Hit Squad and the event was hosted by Serena & Smash Bengali from the BBC Asian Network.

== 2023 Event ==
The 2023 took place on Sunday 4th June 2023. Headline artists included Raghav & Rahim Pardesi and the event was hosted by Haroon Rashid & Mehreen Baig from the BBC Asian Network.

== 2024 Event ==
The 2024 took place on Sunday 23 June 2024. Headline artists included Ezu & H Dhami and the event was hosted by Smash Bengali from the BBC Asian Network.

== 2025 Event ==
The 2025 will take place on Sunday 15 June 2025. Headline artists include Zack Knight.
