= Mangala Gujjari =

Rāga of the tradition of Odissi music

- Odia script: ମଙ୍ଗଳ ଗୁଜ୍ଜରୀ
- Jati: Sadaba - Sampurna
- Badi: Panchama
- Sambadi: Sadaja
- Anga Ragas: Mangala Gujjari

Mangala Gujjari (Odia: ମଙ୍ଗଳ ଗୁଜ୍ଜରୀ, romanized: mangala gujjari) is a rāga belonging to the tradition of Odissi music. Falling under the meḷa Karnāta, the raga uses komala rusabha, komala gandhara, komala dhaibata and komala nisada swaras along with their suddha counterparts and is traditionally associated with the karuṇa rasa. The raga is mentioned in treatises such as the Gita Prakasa and Sangita Narayana. This raga is traditionally believed to have been created by Jayadeva in his Gita Govinda.

== Structure ==
An ancient raga, Mangala Gujjari has been used by hundreds of poet-composers for well-over the past many centuries. Its aroha-abaroha are given below :

Aroha : S G M P d N S

Abaroha : S N d n d P M G r g r S

== Compositions ==
Some of the well-known traditional compositions in this raga include :

- Srita Kamala by Jayadeva
- Kene Gheni Jaucha Jagannathanku by Salabega
