= Gita Govinda =

Medieval Indian text based on Hindu god Radha and Krishna

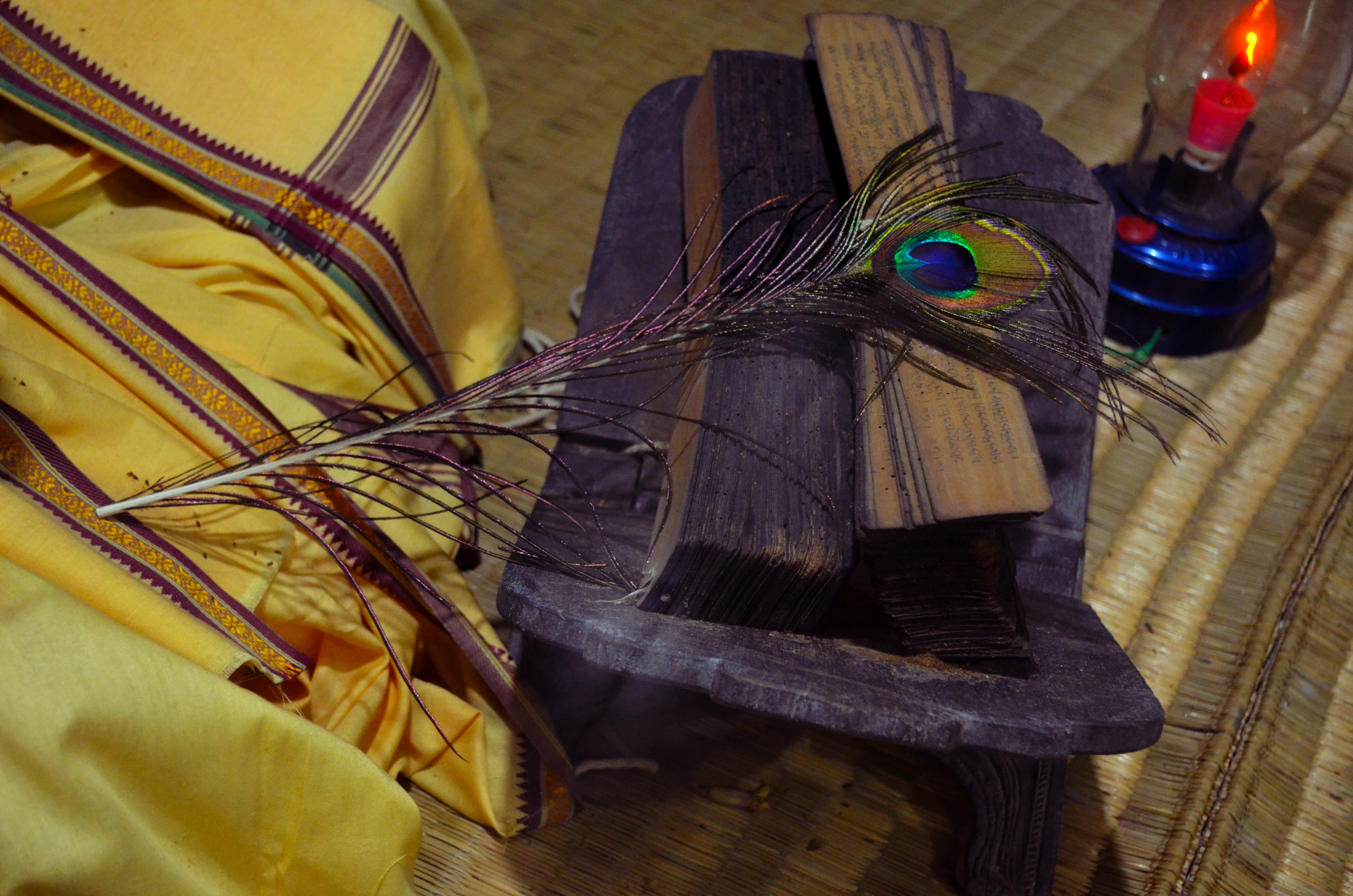
- Original palm leaf manuscript of the Gita Govinda in Odisha State Museum

Information
- Religion: Hinduism
- Author: Jayadeva
- Language: Sanskrit
- Period: 12th CE
- Chapters: 12

The Gita Govinda (Sanskrit: गीतगोविन्दम्; IAST: gītagovindam) is a work composed by the 12th-century Hindu poet, Jayadeva. It describes the relationship between Krishna, Radha and gopis (female cow herders) of Vrindavan.

The Gita Govinda is organized into twelve chapters. Each chapter is further sub-divided into one or more divisions called prabandhas, totalling twenty-four in all. The prabandhas contain couplets grouped into eights, called ashtapadis. The text also elaborates the eight moods of Heroine, the Ashta Nayika, which has been an inspiration for many compositions and choreographic works in Indian classical dances. Every night in the Jagannatha temple, the Gitagovinda of Jayadeva is sung in the style of Odissi music, a tradition that has continued unbroken since the time of Jayadeva himself. Musicians of Kerala have adapted the ashtapadis into a musical form performed in temples called sopana sangeetham. Jayadeva's hymns are also included in the Guru Granth Sahib.

== Summary ==
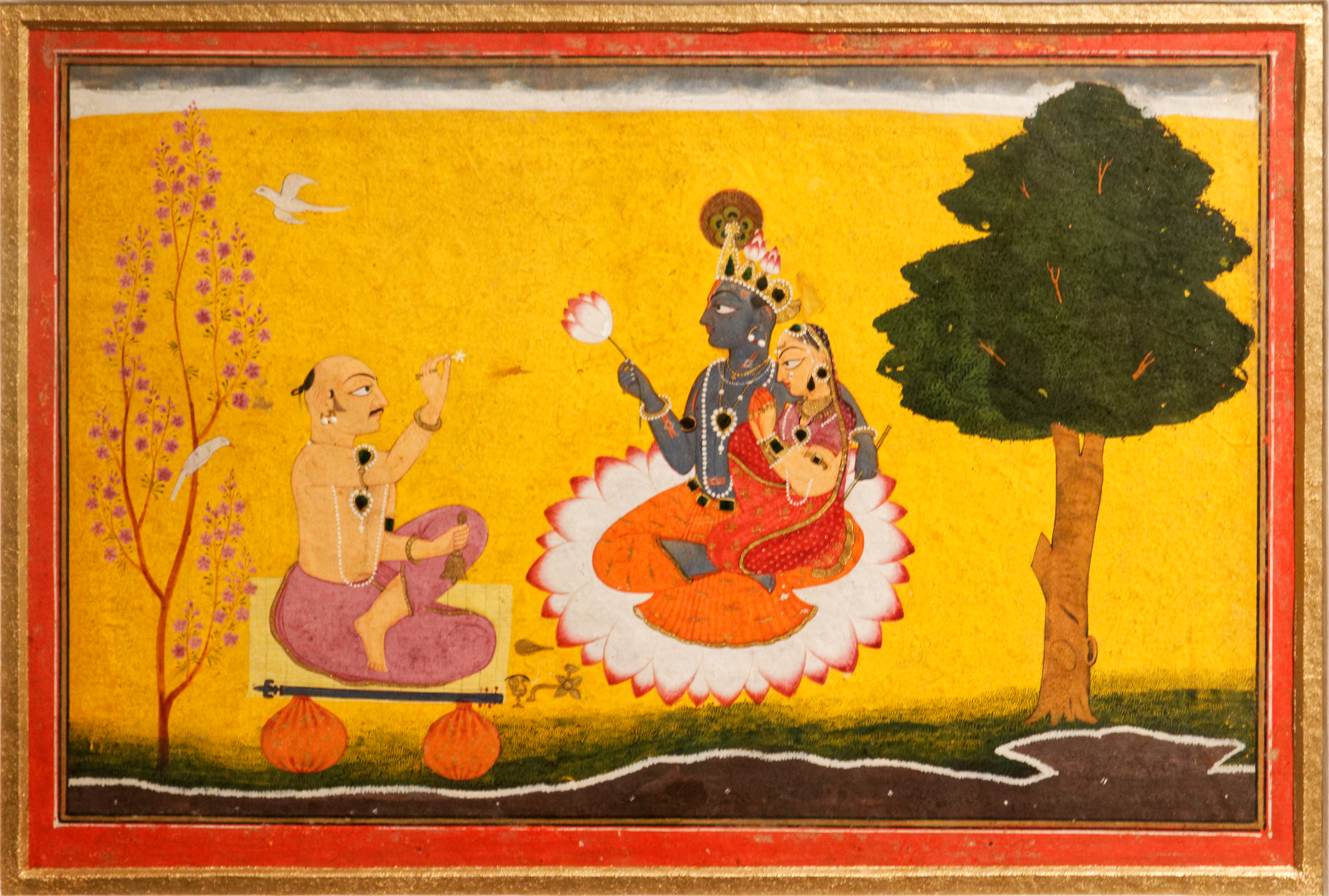
Jayadeva worshipping Krishna and Radha

The work delineates the love of Krishna for Radha, the milkmaid, his faithlessness and subsequent return to her, and is taken as symbolical of the human soul's straying from its true allegiance but returning at length to the God which created it.

=== Chapters ===
1. Sāmoda-dāmodaram (Exuberant Krishna)
2. Akleshakeshavam (Blithesome Krishna)
3. Mugdhamadhusūdanam (Winsome Krishna)
4. Snigdhamadhusūdanam (Tender Krishna)
5. Sākāṅkṣa puṇdarīkākṣham (Passionate Krishna)
6. Dhrṣta vaikuṇṭha (Audacious Krishna)
7. NāgaranārāyanaH (Dexterous Krishna)
8. VilakṣyalakṣmīpatiH (Apologetic Krishna)
9. Mugdhadamukunda (Unpretentious Krishna)
10. ChaturachaturbhujaH (Tactful Krishna)
11. Sānandadāmodaram (Joyful Krishna)
12. SuprītapītāmbaraH (Exultant Krishna)

== Commentaries ==
A large number of commentaries have been written on the text, elaborating on its meaning and music. Scholar Thomas Donaldson mentions that the Gitagovinda was known at Puri not long after its composition, for the earliest commentary on it was written in Odisha around 1190 by Udayanacharya, the Bhavavibhavini Tika. Some of the notable commentaries are Kaviraja Narayana Dasa's Sarvangasundaritika, Rana Kumbha's Rasikapriya Tika, Krsna Das's Sarvangasundaritika, Dhananjaya Bipra's Nutana Sarvangasundaritika, Lakshmana Suri's Srtiranjani Tika, Lakshmana Bhatta's Rasikarangadatika and Dharanidhara's Odia Padyanuvadatika.

Within the school of Gaudiya Vaishnavism, there is a medieval commentary known as the Sri-Gita-Govinda-Vyakhayana by Prabhodananda Sarasvati. Another well-known medieval commentary is the Balabodhini-tika of Chaitanyadasa, also known as Sri Pujari Goswami (late 16th–17th centuries). A contemporary commentary from the Gaudiya Vaishnava school, drawing largely from the Balabodhini-tika, is the Balabodhini-prakasa of Bhaktivedanta Narayana Goswami.

== Translations ==
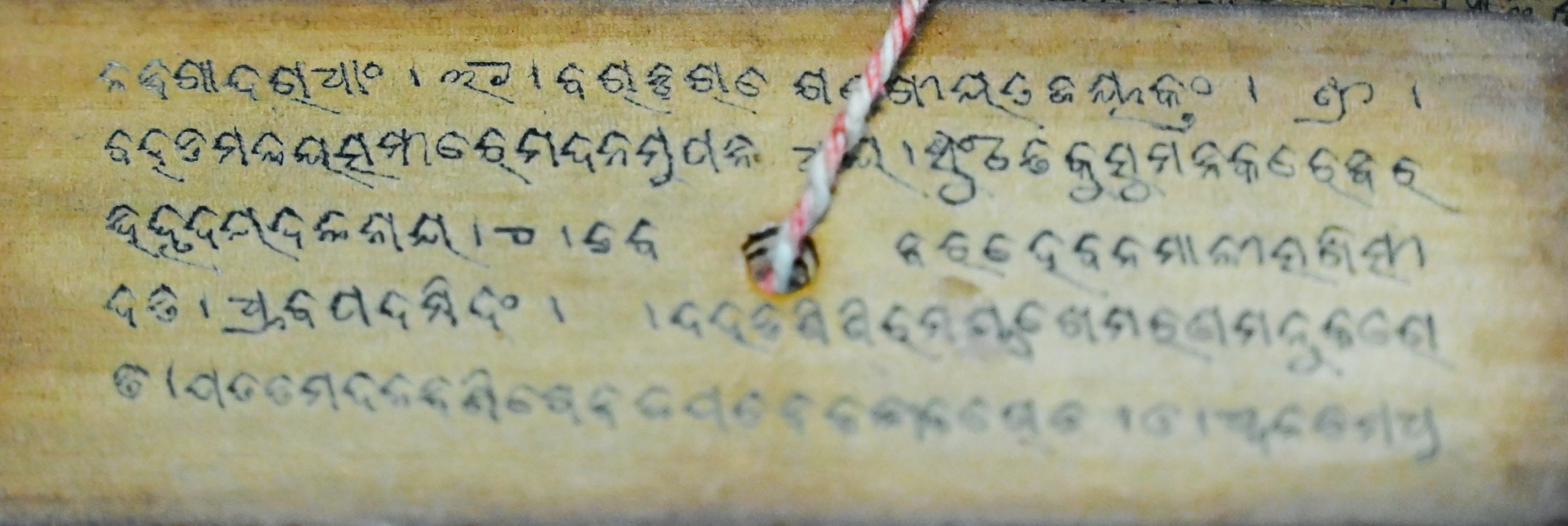
Handwritten palm leaf manuscript of Jayadeva's Gitagovinda by the medieval Odissi musician-poet Gopalakrusna Pattanayaka of Paralakhemundi

The poem has been translated into most modern Indian languages and many European languages. There is a German rendering which Goethe read by F. H . van Dalberg. Dalberg's version was based on the English translation done by William Jones published in the Transactions of the Asiatic Society, Calcutta in 1792. A verse translation by the German poet Friedrich Rückert was begun in 1829 and revised according to the edited Sanskrit and Latin translations of C. Lassen in Bonn 1837. There's also another manuscript at the Guimet Museum in Paris in Devanagari script narrating the love between Krishna and Radha. This oblong work is printed on paper in nagari script on seven lines per page, and has a foliation located in the left margin on the reverse. It is made up of 36 folios. This volume is decorated with a snow crystal motif scattered throughout the text, a practice typical of the Indian publisher Baburam. This edition was produced in Calcutta in 1808, in imitation of the manuscripts; devoid of title page, it is accompanied by a colophon. The present binding, executed at the museum in 1991, constitutes a reproduction very faithful to its original appearance.

Notable English translations are: Edwin Arnold's The Indian Song of Songs (1875); Sri Jayadevas Gita Govinda: The loves of Krisna and Radha (Bombay 1940) by George Keyt and Harold Peiris; S. Lakshminarasimha Sastri The Gita Govinda of Jayadeva, Madras, 1956; Duncan Greenlee's Theosophical rendering The Song of the Divine, Madras, 1962; Monica Varma's transcreation The Gita Govinda of Jayadeva published by Writer's Workshop, Calcutta, 1968; Barbara Stoler Miller's Jayadeva's Gitagovinda : Love song of the Dark Lord published by Oxford University Press, Delhi,1978; Lee Siegel's Gitagovinda: Love Songs of Radha and Krishna published in the Clay Sanskrit series.

The first English translation of the Gita Govinda was written by Sir William Jones in 1792, where Cenduli (Kenduli Sasana) of Calinga (Kalinga, ancient Odisha) is referred to as the widely-believed to be the place of Jayadeva's origin and that the poet himself mentions this. Since then, the Gita Govinda has been translated to many languages throughout the world, and is considered to be among the finest examples of Sanskrit poetry. Barbara Stoler Miller translated the book in 1977 as Love Song of the Dark Lord: Jayadeva's Gita Govinda. The book contains a foreword by John Stratton Hawley and includes extensive commentary on the verse and topic of the poem.

== Music ==
Gita Govinda is one of the earliest musical texts in which the author indicates the exact raga (mode) and tala (rhythm) in which to sing each of the songs. These indications have been compiled below according to the ashtapadi number, based on the important ancient copies of the Gita Govinda and its commentaries such as Sarvangasundari Tika of Narayana Dasa (14th century), Dharanidhara's Tika (16th century), Jagannatha Mishra's Tika (16th century), Rasikapriya of Rana Kumbha (16th century) and Arthagobinda of Bajuri Dasa (17th century).

1. Mālava, Mālavagauḍa or Mālavagauḍā
2. Maṅgala Gujjarī or Gurjarī
3. Basanta
4. Rāmakirī or Rāmakerī
5. Gujjarī or Gurjarī
6. Guṇḍakirī or Guṇḍakerī or Mālavagauḍa
7. Gujjarī or Gurjarī
8. Karṇṇāṭa
9. Deśākhya or Deśākṣa
10. Deśī Barāḍi or Deśa Barāḍi or Pañchama Barāḍi
11. Gujjarī or Gurjarī
12. Guṇḍakirī or Guṇḍakerī
13. Mālava or Mālavagauḍā
14. Basanta
15. Gujjarī or Gurjarī
16. Barāḍi or Deśa Barāḍi or Deśī Barāḍi
17. Bhairabī
18. Gujjarī or Gurjarī or Rāmakerī
19. Deśī or Deśa Barāḍi
20. Basanta
21. Barāḍi or Deśa Barāḍi
22. Barāḍi
23. Rāmakirī or Rāmakerī or Bibhāsa
24. Rāmakirī or Rāmakerī

Most of the ragas and talas indicated by Jayadeva, continue to be in practice in the tradition of Odissi music. The ragas and talas prescribed by Jayadeva are unique to the tradition of Odissi music. It is noteworthy that in Odisha, these ragas and talas have remained in continued usage for several centuries after Jayadeva, and enjoy extreme popularity in the state till date.

Every night during the Badasinghara or the last ritual of the Jagannatha temple of Puri, the Gitagovinda of Jayadeva is sung, set to traditional Odissi ragas & talas, such as Mangala Gujjari. Jayadeva mentions many ragas and talas unique to Odisha, such as aṣṭatāli or āṭhatāli. This tradition has continued unbroken since the time of Jayadeva, who himself used to sing in the temple. After the time of the poet, the singing of the Gitagovinda according to the authentic Odissi ragas & talas, (such as the Raga Mangala Gujjari) was instated as a mandatory sevā at the temple, to be performed by the Maharis or Devadasis, systematically recorded in inscriptions, the Mādalā Pānji and other official documents that describe the functioning of the temple.

== Gita Govinda at Museums ==
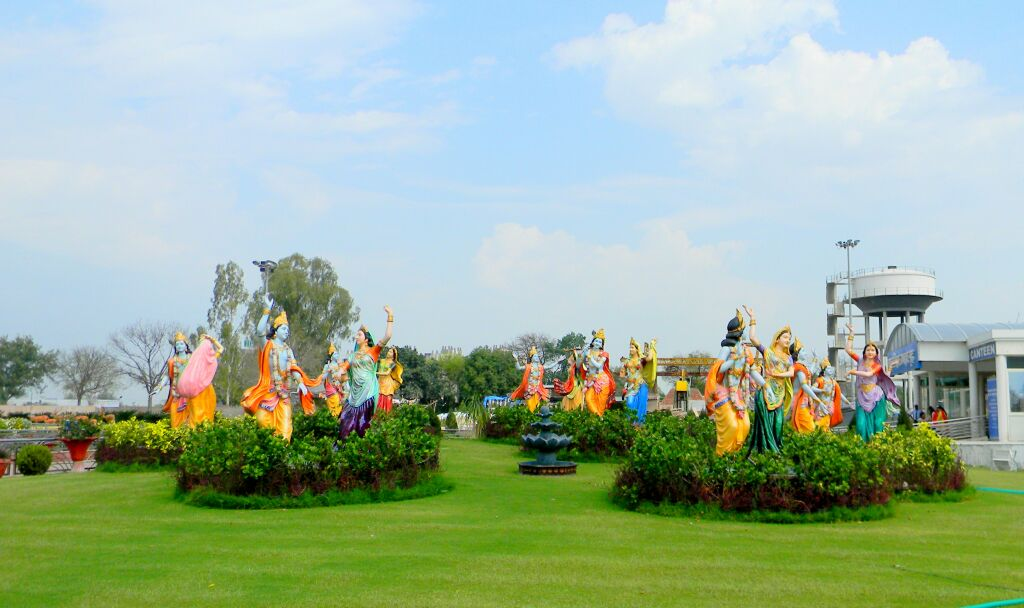
Rasalila by Krishna, in Prem Mandir, Vrindavan, Uttar Pradesh, India

Various Gita Govinda Miniature paintings in museums:

- Odisha State Museum, Bhubaneswar
- National Museum of India, New Delhi
- Honolulu Museum of Art, Hawaii
- Chhatrapati Shivaji Maharaj Vastu Sangrahalaya, Mumbai
- Metropolitan Museum of art, New York City
- Indian Museum, Kolkata
- Govt. Museum and Art Gallery Chandigarh
- Rietberg Museum, Zürich
- Guimet Museum, Paris

== Publications ==
in English

- Love Song of the Dark Lord: Jayadeva's Gītagovinda. Translated by Barbara Stoler Miller. New York: Columbia University Press. 1977. ISBN 0231040288.
- In Praise of Krishna: Gita-Govinda of Jayadeva. Translated by Durgadas Mukhopadhyay. Delhi: B.R. Publishing. 1990.

== See also ==
- Works of Jayadeva
- Jayadeva birth controversy
- Achyuta Shataka
- Mukundamala
- Madhura Ashtaka
