= Birmingham Mela =

Birmingham Mela (also known as Sandwell & Birmingham Mela) is an annual South Asian themed cultural and music festival (Mela) held in Sandwell, bordering Birmingham, England. It was first held in 2011; in 2015, more than 120,000 people attended the festival.

== History ==
The first festival took place in July 2011 in Victoria Park, Smethwick, and had about 45,000 visitors. Tickets were free.

In 2011 and 2012, the event was sponsored by the South Asian broadcaster Star TV Network. Subsequent sponsors have included Zee Entertainment Enterprises and Ola Cabs.

In 2020 and 2021, The Birmingham Mela was cancelled due to the Covid-19 pandemic. It has been scheduled to take place again in August 2022.

== Performers ==
Performers have included Mika Singh, Gippy Grewal, Ali Zafar, and Tiger Shroff.
