= Mukundamala =

Sanskrit eulogy about Krishna

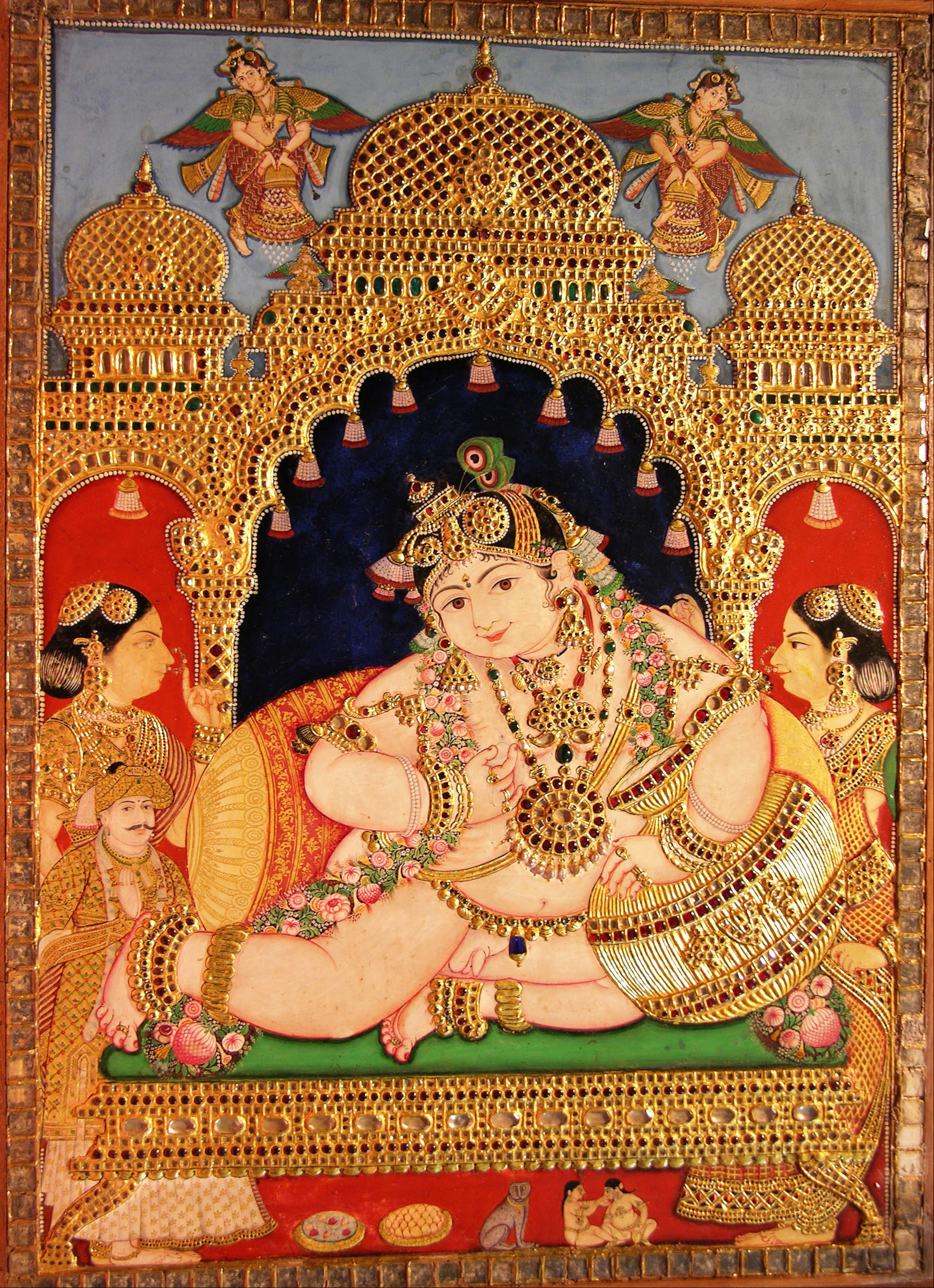
- Navaneeta Krishna, 19th century Thanjavur painting.

Information
- Religion: Hinduism
- Author: Kulasekhara Alvar
- Language: Sanskrit
- Verses: 40

The Mukundamala (Sanskrit: मुकुन्दमाला, romanized: Mukundamālā) is a Sanskrit hymn composed by the Hindu poet-saint Kulasekhara, seventh of the twelve Alvars of the Sri Vaishnava tradition. Comprising 40 verses, the hymn is addressed to the deity Krishna.

== Description ==
Scholars identify Kulasekhara as one of the earliest Cera rulers of Mahodayam, modern Kodungallur or Cranganore in Kerala. The Sanskrit hymns of the Mukundamala ask Mukunda, another name for Krishna, to give the unworthy author freedom from samsara. It describes the misery of the soul trapped in this world and exhorts that Krishna is the only means of salvation. The exploits of the deity are also described in the work. The hymn was completed at the Ranganathaswamy Temple of Srirangam.

== Literary genre and structure ==
In Sanskrit literary tradition, historians and critics classify the Mukundamala as a devotional lyric or stotra. Literary scholars such as Winternitz and De place it alongside Bilvamangala's Krsnakarnamrta and Jayadeva's Gitagovinda as one of the three outstanding Sanskrit devotional lyrics produced within the medieval Bhakti tradition. The poem is characterized by passionate expressions of prayer, supplication, and complete surrender to the deity. Although composed in a refined artistic form with traditional stylistic embellishments, it maintains a direct and personal devotional tone. The text was published in the printed compilation Kavyamala (Part I, 1886) by the Nirnaya Sagara Press in Bombay. Individual verses from the Mukundamala were also frequently excerpted in later devotional anthologies; for example, three of its verses were incorporated into the apocryphal collection Bilvamangalastotra.

== Authorship and chronology debates ==
The authorship and date of the Mukundamala remain subjects of scholarly discussion. The text internally attributes its composition to a ruler named King Kulasekhara, who identifies himself in verse 34 of the poem.

Historians of South India have traditionally connected the author with the Cera dynasty. Scholars including Pillai and Kesavan identify the royal author with the 9th-century Cera monarch Sthanu Ravi Kulasekhara (reigned c. 844-884 CE). In a separate analysis, Unni distinguishes the Tamil saint Kulasekhara Alvar from the royal playwright Kulasekhara, but inclines toward identifying the royal dramatist (author of Tapatisamvarana and Subhadradhananjaya) with the author of the Mukundamala. This connection is supported by a variant reading of the final verse of the Mukundamala, which mentions two friends of its royal author named Ravi and Lokavira.

Conversely, textual scholar Suganya Anandakichenin proposes that Kulasekhara Alvar was a 9th- to 10th-century Tamil chieftain belonging to the Konku-Cera clan ruling from Kolli who composed exclusively in Tamil. On these grounds, she argues that he was not the author of the Sanskrit Mukundamala. Narahari notes that a definitive consensus regarding the historical identity of the author has yet to be reached.

== Excerpt ==
The first hymn of the Mukundamala extols Vishnu's various attributes:

śrī-vallabheti vara-deti dayā-pareti
bhakta-priyeti bhava-luṇṭhana-kovideti
nātheti nāga-śayaneti jagan-nivāsety
ālāpinaṁ prati-dinaṁ kuru māṁ mukunda

O, Mukunda! make me your glory great oft recount,
As Laksmi's consort dear, as the bestower bounteous,
As the all-merciful, as the great friend of the devout,
As the deft destroyer of earthly bondage, as my sole support
As the one lying on the serpent couch in sweet repose,
As the all-pervading Lord of the universe.

— Mukundamala, Verse 1

The second hymn of the work directly addresses Vishnu's incarnation of Krishna:

jayatu jayatu devo devakī-nandano ’yaṁ
jayatu jayatu kṛṣṇo vṛṣṇi-vaṁśa-pradīpaḥ
jayatu jayatu megha-śyāmalaḥ komalāṅgo
jayatu jayatu pṛthvī-bhāra-nāśo mukundaḥ

Victory, Victory unto Devaki’s celestial darling,
Victory, Victory unto Krsna, the beacon-light of Vrsni’s clan,
Victory, Victory unto Him, the dark-black cloud-hued, of body charming,
Victory, Victory unto Mukunda who rid clean The Earth of its unwholesome burden.

— Mukundamala, Verse 2

== See also ==
- Achyuta Shataka
- Madhurashtaka
- Krishna Karnamrita
- Gita Govinda
