= Works of Jayadeva =

Jayadeva was an 11th-century Sanskrit poet and lyricist from present-day India. The works of Jayadeva have had a profound influence on Indian culture. They form the basis of the east Indian classical dance form, Odissi as well as traditional classical music of the state, Odissi music and have strongly influenced the Bharatanatyam classical dance as well as Carnatic music. Jayadeva's composition has also been incorporated in the Guru Granth Sahib.

== Religion ==
Jayadeva has had a profound influence on the religious practices of Hinduism. The classic Tribhanga (threefold) posture of Krishna playing the flute gained popularity due to him.

=== Dashavatara ===
Jayadeva was instrumental in popularizing the Dasavatara, the ten incarnations of Vishnu in his composition Dasakritikrite. Additionally, the Gita Govinda begins with a Dasavatara stotra. In Jayadeva's version of Dasavatara, Buddha is an incarnation of Vishnu, while Krishna is not incorporated because Krishna is the source of all incarnations. as the lyrics say: keshava dhrta buddha sarira= krishna who appears in the form of Lord Buddha. Since Keshava is another name of Krishna, that means Krishna is the source of/incarnate as Buddha.

In July 2009, the Government of India's Department of Posts decided to release 11 stamps in Bhubaneswar to commemorate the birth of Jayadeva. One stamp depicts the poet himself, while the other ten depict the Dasavatara. Chief Minister Naveen Patnaik unveiled the stamps at a special function in Jayadev Bhawan. They are in the denomination of ₹5. A total of 800,000 stamps were released for sale in Odisha.

=== Hymns in the Guru Granth Sahib ===
Two hymns composed by Jayadeva have been incorporated in the Guru Granth Sahib, the holy book of Sikhism. Although it is not clear how these medieval Odishan hymns found their way to the Sikh religion, there are records narrating how Jayadeva's work had a profound influence on Guru Nanak during his visit to Puri.

== Music and dance ==
=== Odissi ===
In the opinion of researcher scholars, Jayadeva is among the centralmost figures in Odia culture. Jayadeva's ashtapadis are sung in dance performances of Odissi, the classical dance of Odisha .

=== Classical music of Odisha ===
The traditional classical music of Odisha, known as Odissi music, lays emphasis based on ragas and talas specified by Jayadeva's hymns. Jayadeva is known to have sung the Gitagovinda every night in the temple of Jagannatha, the central deity of Odisha. The tradition of singing Gitagovinda during Jagannatha's last ritual continues till today.

== Fine arts ==
Jayadeva and his Gita Govinda had gained considerable popularity and had emerged as a painter’s theme by the late 15th century, though no such early paintings are available now. The earliest reported Gita Govinda paintings are from Mewar between 1590 and 1600 A.D.

=== Patachitra paintings ===
The Gita Govinda composed by Jayadeva is one of the popular themes in the traditional patachitra paintings of Odisha.

=== Pahari paintings ===
Jayadeva had a profound influence on the Pahari school during the 17th-19th centuries, which was prevalent throughout northern India bordering the Himalayas (from Jammu through Himachal Pradesh). In particular, Jayadeva's Radha and Krishna served as popular themes for Basohli painting in Jammu and Kashmir.

== The Gita Govinda ==
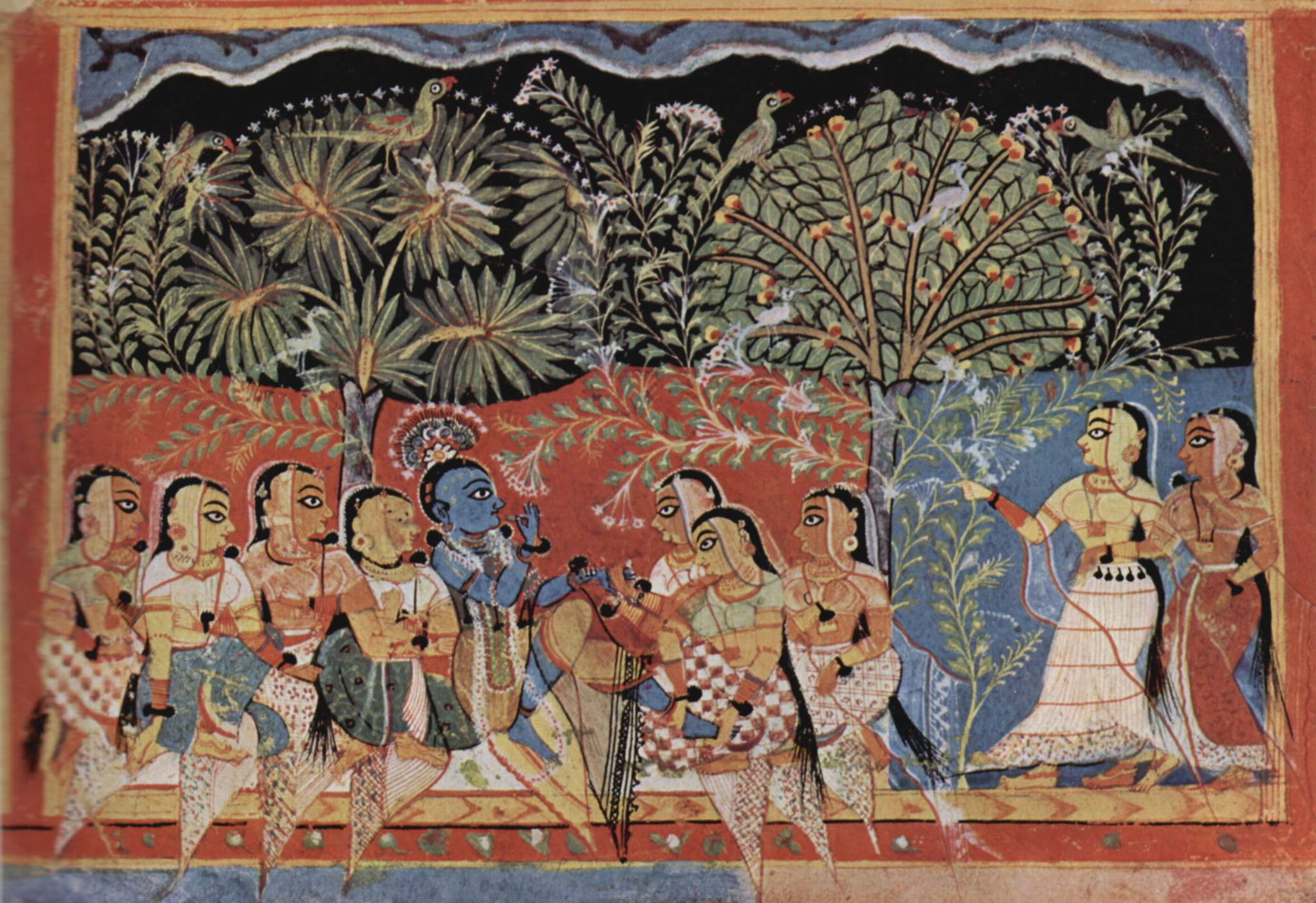
Gita Govinda manuscript c. 1500.

The Gita Govinda is the best-known composition of Jayadeva. It is a lyrical poetry that is organized into 12 chapters. Each chapter is further sub-divided into 24 divisions called prabandhas. The prabandhas contain couplets grouped into eights, called Ashtapadis.

The first English translation of the Gita Govinda was published by Sir William Jones in 1792. Sir William Jones in the preface of his English rendering of GitaGovinda had commented:

"Jayadeva was born as he tells himself in Kenduli which many believe to be in Kalinga, but since there is a town of similar name in Burdwan, the natives of it insist that the finest lyrical poet of India was their countryman."

At last the village Kenduli in Burdwan (Division) was accepted in his paper 'The Musical Modes of Hindus' written by Jones himself. Since then, the Gita Govinda has been translated to many languages throughout the world and is considered to be among the finest examples of Sanskrit poetry. Noteworthy among them is Love Song of the Dark Lord, by Barbara Stoler Miller.

== Other literary contributions ==
Jayadeva wrote Piyusha Lahari, a Sanskrit Goshti Rupaka. It was based on the romantic love between Radha and Krishna similar in line to Gita Govindam. It was translated into Telugu by Vavilala Somayajulu and published in 1993 by Telugu University in 1990.

== See also ==
- Gita Govinda
- Jayadeva in Sikhism
