= Achyuta =

Epithet of Krishna or Vishnu

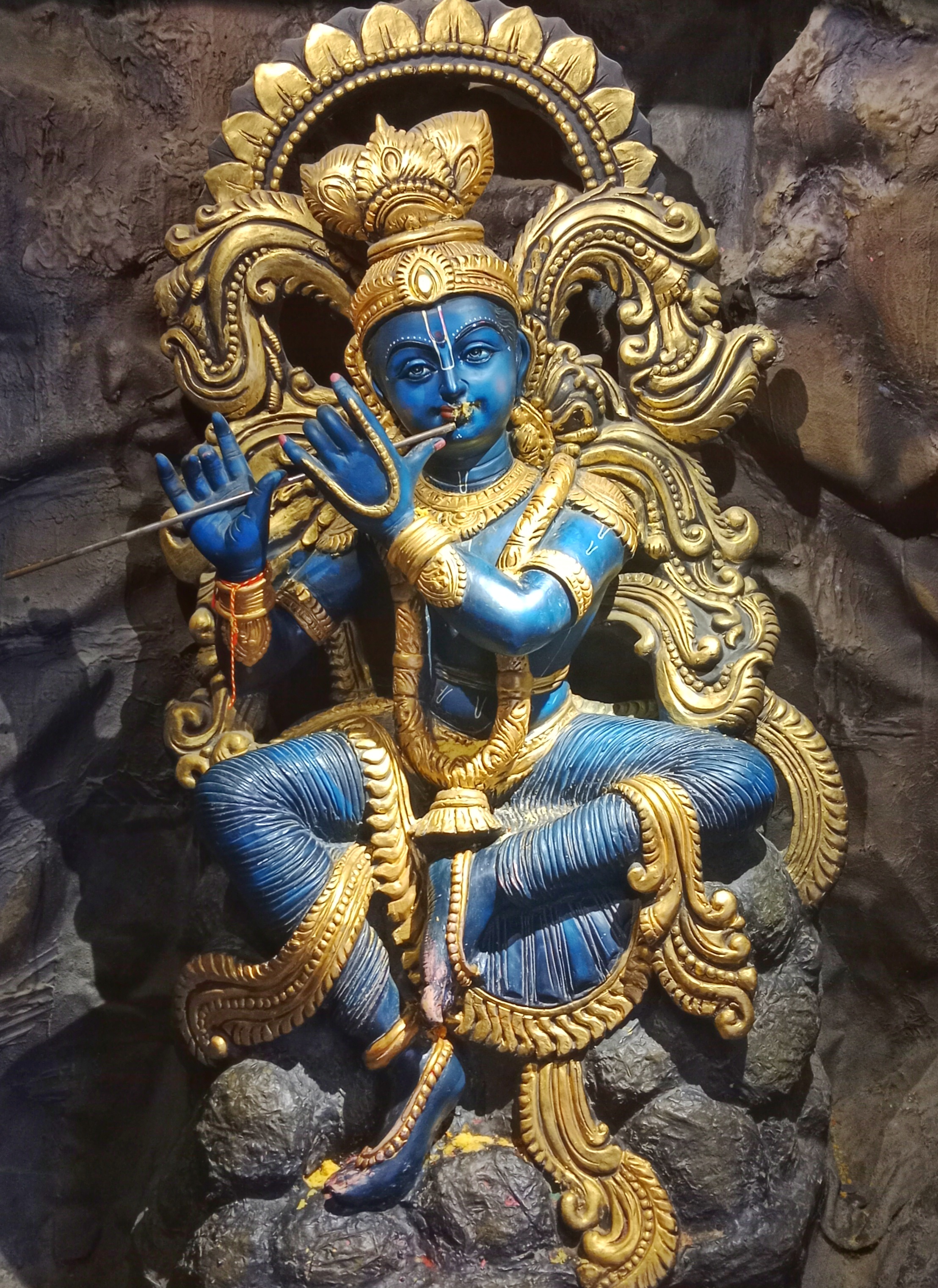
Achyuta (Krishna) at Sri Priyakant ju temple, Vrindavan

Achyuta (Sanskrit: अच्युत, lit. 'the infallible one', IAST: Acyuta) is a Sanskrit epithet used in Hindu traditions - especially Vaishnava devotional traditions - to signify the divine quality of being 'not fallen', 'infallible', or 'immutable'. The epithet is applied to Vishnu and to Krishna in various scriptural and devotional contexts.

It appears as the 100th and 318th names in the Vishnu Sahasranama. It is also used frequently in the Bhagavad Gita as a personal name of Krishna. According to Adi Shankara's commentary on the 1000 names of Vishnu, Achyuta means 'one who will never lose his inherent nature and powers'. The name also means 'immovable' and 'unchangeable', and is applied to 'the one who is without the six transformations (beginning with birth).'

== Interpretation ==
=== Etymology ===
The Sanskrit term acyuta is formed from the negative prefix a- and the root cyuta (“fallen”), yielding the literal sense “not fallen” or “unfallen”. Classical lexicons describe meanings such as “firm”, “fixed”, “immovable”, and “imperishable”. These senses underpin the theological usage of the name as denoting the divine who does not fall from his nature or status.

=== Scriptural references ===
==== Bhagavad Gita ====
The epithet appears in the Bhagavad Gītā, where Arjuna addresses Krishna as Acyuta. Notable occurrences include Gītā 1.21–22, 11.41–42, and 18.73. In these contexts, commentators gloss Acyuta as “O infallible one” or “O one who never falls”.

Arjuna uvācha

Senayor ubhayor madhye rathaṁ sthāpaya me ’chyuta; Yāvadetān nirīkṣhe ’haṁ yoddhu-kāmān avasthitān; Kairmayā saha yoddhavyam asmin raṇa-samudyame

Arjun said: O Infallible One, please take my chariot to the middle of both armies, so that I may look at the warriors arrayed for battle, whom I must fight in this great combat.

- Bhagavad Gita 1.21-22

Sakheti matvā prasabhaṁ yad uktaṁ, He kṛiṣhṇa he yādava he sakheti

Ajānatā mahimānaṁ tavedaṁ, Mayā pramādāt praṇayena vāpi

Yach chāvahāsārtham asat-kṛito ’si, Vihāra-śhayyāsana-bhojaneṣhu

Rko ’tha vāpy achyuta tat-samakṣhaṁ, Tat kṣhāmaye tvām aham aprameyam

Thinking of You as my friend, I presumptuously addressed You as, “O Krishna,” “O Yadav,” “O my dear Friend.” I was ignorant of Your majesty, showing negligence and undue affection. And if, jestfully, I treated You with disrespect, while playing, resting, sitting, eating, when alone, or before others—for all that I crave forgiveness.

- Bhagavad Gita 11.41-42

Arjuna uvācha

Naṣhṭo mohaḥ smṛitir labdhā tvat-prasādān mayāchyuta, Sthito ‘smi gata-sandehaḥ kariṣhye vachanaṁ tava

Arjun said: O Infallible One, by Your grace my illusion has been dispelled, and I am situated in knowledge. I am now free from doubts, and I shall act according to Your instructions.

- Bhagavad Gita 18.73

==== Vishnu Sahasranama and other lists ====
Acyuta appears in traditional lists of Vishnu’s names, such as the Vishnu Sahasranāma. It is cited in commentarial traditions and devotional recensions as a name signifying the divine who never deviates from his essence.

==== Pancharatra and Puranic usages ====
In the Pāñcarātra samhitas and related Agamic texts, Acyuta designates one of the divine emanations (vyūhas) of Narayana. Scholarship notes that variant lists occur across samhitas, and the term carries specific theological and ritual connotations in these contexts.

=== Devotional and literary usage ===
The name Achyuta is widely used in bhakti poetry, stotras, and kīrtanas to evoke Krishna’s or Vishnu’s steadfastness and perfection. One of the best-known examples is the Achyuta Shataka by Vedanta Desika, a hymn entirely devoted to this epithet.

=== Theological interpretation ===
In the Vishnu Sahasranama, the name Achyuta is listed among the thousand names of Vishnu, and by extension to Krishna. The name is traditionally interpreted as "one who does not fall" – from his essential nature, from truth, or from eternal dharma.

Commentarial and devotional literature interpret Achyuta in keeping with its etymology: “one who does not fall,” “infallible,” “unchangeable,” and “imperishable.” These interpretations recur in lexica and theological commentaries.

According to Adi Shankaracharya’s commentary on the Vishnu Sahasranama (Sahasranama Bhashya), Achyuta means 'one who will never lose his inherent nature and powers.' Shankaracharya emphasises that the Lord remains unchanging, unaffected by time, circumstance, or illusion, and cannot fall from his divine status or knowledge.

According to the Pancaratra, Achyuta is one of the twenty-four forms of Vishnu through which Narayana manifests himself. He is accompanied by a counterpart emanation of Lakshmi who goes by the name Vijaya.

The name is frequently used in devotional literature to highlight the infallible and unalterable nature of the deity, especially in Vaishnavism.

=== Other uses ===
The element Achyuta or Acyuta is also found as a personal name among historical figures, rulers, and scholars, showing its use as both a divine epithet and a personal name.

== See also ==
- Gopala
- Gopinath
- Govinda
- Hari
- Keshava
- Madhava
- Narayana
- Radha Ramana
- Vāsudeva
- Vishnu Sahasranama
- Krishna
- Vishnu
- Pancharatra
