= Achyuta Shataka =

Prakrit hymn about Krishna

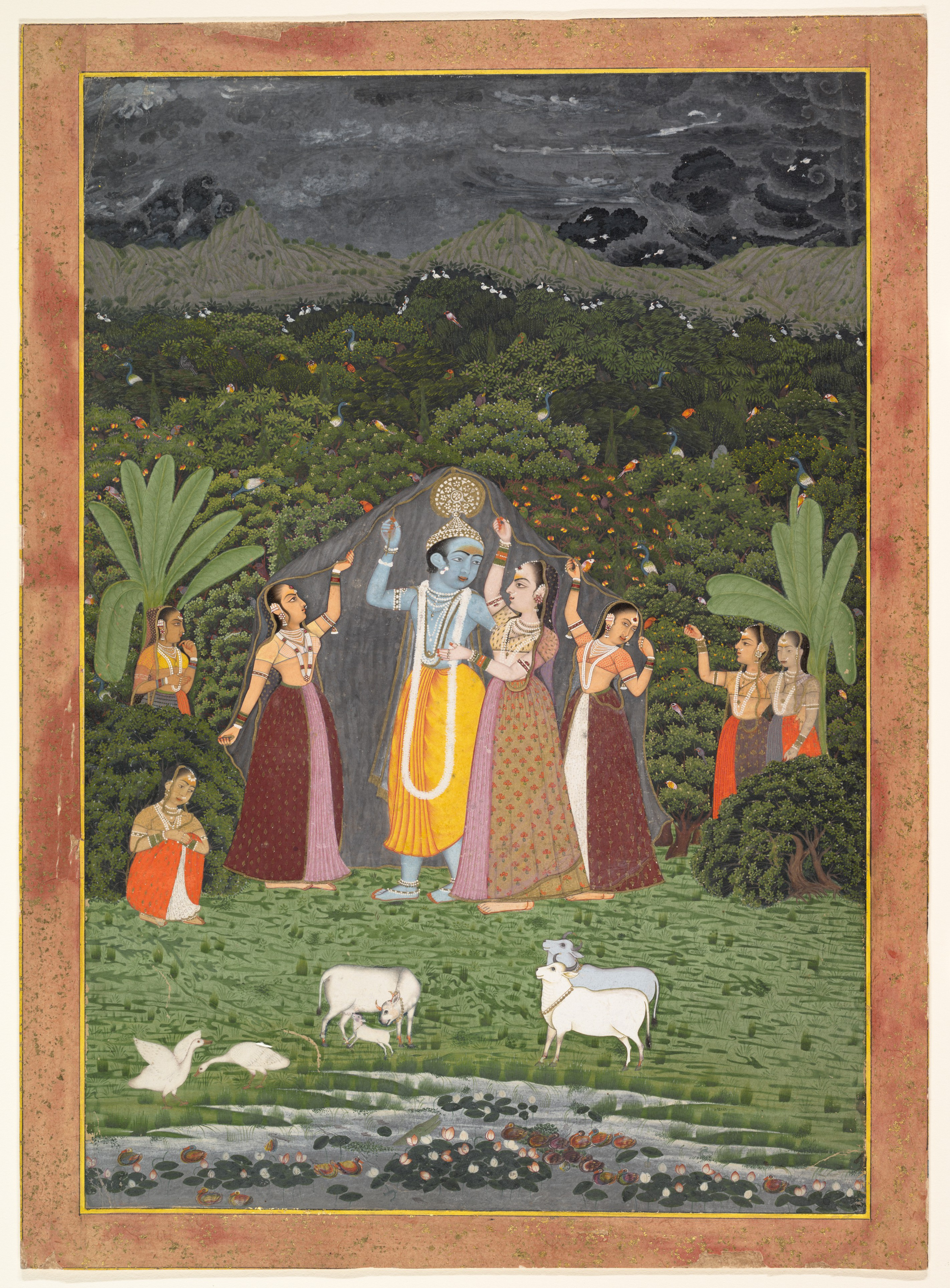
- Painting of Krishna and the gopis taking shelter from the rain, Metropolitan Museum of Art.

Information
- Religion: Hinduism
- Author: Vedanta Desika
- Language: Prakrit (Maharashtri Prakrit)
- Verses: 100

The Achyuta Shataka (Sanskrit: अच्युतशतक, romanized: Acyutaśataka) is a Prakrit hymn written by the Hindu philosopher Vedanta Desika. Comprising 100 verses, the Achyuta Shataka extols Krishna, an avatar of the deity Vishnu. The hymn is composed in the arya metre. It is regarded to have been inspired by the Tiruvaymoli of Nammalvar.

== Etymology ==
Achyuta is an epithet of Krishna and Vishnu, literally meaning, "the infallible one", and shataka means "hundred", referring to a genre of literature containing one hundred verses.

== Description ==
Vedanta Desika is regarded to have composed the Achyuta Shataka when he visited the Devanathaswamy temple located at Tiruvahindrapuram, addressing it to the deity. He is regarded to employ the theme of nāyikā-bhāva in the hymn, the mysticism of a heroine, owing to the prevailing dramatic convention of heroines speaking in Prakrit in Sanskrit dramas. In the verses of this work, the poet asks Krishna to accept him as he would accept a bride.

== Hymn ==
In the first hymn of the work, the poet extols Krishna:

Bow down before Acyuta,
the Lord of Gods,
Lord of Truth to his servants,
inextinguishable radiance,
dark cool tamāla tree
on the banks of the Garuda River:
a king of elephants
who wanders the slopes of Medicine Hill
in the town
of the Serpent King

— Achyuta Shataka, Verse 1

== See also ==
- Mukundamala
- Madhurashtaka
- Gita Govinda
