= Dhumpa sangita =

Rendition of iconic dhumpa lyric of poet Gadadhara Singhasamanta 'dhumpa sangitare bali' by artists of Gadadhara Dhumpa Parisada, Khandapada, Nayagarh

Dhumpa sangita is a folk musical art form from the Ganjam and Nayagarh districts of Odisha in India. It derives its name from the dhumpa, a bamboo percussion instrument that accompanies the performance. The tradition is currently on the decline and faces the threat of extinction.

== Creation ==
The creation of the dhumpa is credited to Kabisurjya Baladeba Ratha, an Odia poet of the late 18th and early 19th century from the Ganjam district of Odisha. He designed the dhumpa as an instrument to accompany the recital of his lyrics and satires which are still called dhumpa geeta in rural areas of the Ganjam district.

== Dhumpa ==
The dhumpa consists of a cylindrical hollow bamboo, of six to seven feet in length, wrapped in colorful zari and fitted on a long wooden ply. It can be played by up to four persons simultaneously. It is traditionally played with sticks to produce a rhythmic beat, a technique that continues to be used by modern tribal musicians.

== Performances ==
Dhumpa sangita performances have troupes of up to ten musicians who play different percussion instruments, a principal singer, chorus singers and a Gotipua dancer. In some performances the principal singing is accompanied by instruments like harmonium, tabla, flute, veena, mardala, thali and nagara.

== Declining popularity and attempts at revival ==
Although an important part of the literary and cultural history of Odisha, dhumpa performances have become a rarity in the state. Only 30 to 40 practitioners of the art now live in Digapahandi, the birthplace of Kabisurjya and the dhumpa geet. In recent years, the Government of Odisha and India have taken steps to revive interest in this art form. The Eastern Zonal Cultural Centre (EZCC), Kolkata has been promoting dhumpa sangita under its ‘guru-shishya parampara’ scheme. Patronage by the erstwhile royal family of Digapahandi have also helped set off a gradual revival in the art form. Guru Aditya Kumar Patro, Digapahandi, Ganjam. The notable exponents of the art form.
