= Madhurāṣṭakam =

Sanskrit Hindu octet

The Madhurāṣṭakam (Sanskrit: मधुराष्टकम्), also spelt as Madhurashtakam, is a 16th-century Hindu Sanskrit ashtakam in devotion of Krishna, composed by the Hindu Bhakti saint Vallabha. Vallabha was a Telugu Brahmin who propagated Pushtimarga, which emphasizes on the unconditional bhakti and seva of Krishna. According to legend, when Krishna himself appeared in front of Vallabha, on the midnight of Shravana Shukla Ekadashi, the philosopher composed the Madhurashtakam in praise of the deity.

The devotional hymn "Madhurāṣṭakam" of Vallabha was created to lead the devotee in Pustimarga, the Path of Grace, which involves a constant love-filled devotion to Krishna by various acts of homage, such as singing (kirtana), remembering (smarana), conceptualising and beholding (darshana) a beatific image of the deity and offering of services (seva). According to this philosophy, these acts enable the devotee to enter into the divine presence of Krishna and to experience the deity's real essence (svarupa) which are in fact, succinctly laid down by the Madhurāṣṭakam. Madhurāṣṭakam is regarded play an instrumental role in the realisation of the deity.

== Genre ==
The term aṣṭakam is derived from the Sanskrit word aṣṭa, meaning "eight". An aṣṭakam is made up of eight stanzas.

Aṣṭakam belong to the genre of lyric poetry, which tends to be short, extremely melodic, and contemplative. It reflects and portrays the poet's own feelings, states of mind, and perceptions about the theme or character in the aṣṭakam.

== Context ==
The thought behind the composition in 'Bhakti mixed with Love', being a typical frame of devotion and dedication in the Bhakti movement. In the loved bhakti frame, the devotee falls in love with the almighty and to the devotee, all the attributes and actions of God appears sweet, as those appear to a lover.

The Madhurāṣṭakam deals with the qualities and deeds of Krishna, all of which have been conceptualized as being dipped in madhu, meaning honey or nectar. In the eyes of the devotee, everything that pertains to the deity is sweet and graceful, he being the adipati (sovereign) of all sweetness.

The body of the Madhurāṣṭakam includes many qualities, attributes and motifs associated with Krishna, including the venu flute, cows, the Yamuna river, gopis, and Krishna's lila. These symbols and motifs related to the life and deeds of Krishna have been labelled as 'sweet' in the astakam.

== Text ==
See Sanskrit for details of pronunciation.

Devanagari	IAST	English Translation
॥ मधुराष्टकम् ॥		Eight Stanzas on Sweetness
वल्लभ आचार्य	vallabha ācārya	Vallabha Acharya
अधरं मधुरं	adharaṃ madhuraṃ	(His) lips are sweet
वदनं मधुरं	vadanaṃ madhuraṃ	(His) face is sweet
नयनं मधुरं	nayanaṃ madhuraṃ	(His) eyes are sweet
हसितं मधुरम् ‌।	hasitaṃ madhuram	(His) smile is sweet
हृदयं मधुरं	hṛdayaṃ madhuraṃ	(His) heart is sweet
गमनं मधुरं	gamanaṃ madhuraṃ	(His) gait (walk) is sweet
मधुराधिपतेरखिलं मधुरम् ‌॥ १ ॥	madhurādhipaterakhilaṃ madhuram (1)	Everything is sweet about the Lord of Sweetness
वचनं मधुरं	vacanaṃ madhuraṃ	(His) words are sweet
चरितं मधुरं	caritaṃ madhuraṃ	(His) character and deeds are sweet
वसनं मधुरं	vasanaṃ madhuraṃ	(His) dress (garment) is sweet
वलितं मधुरम्‌ ।	valitaṃ madhuram	(His) posture is sweet
चलितं मधुरं	calitaṃ madhuraṃ	(His) movements are sweet
भ्रमितं मधुरं	bhramitaṃ madhuraṃ	(His) wandering is sweet
मधुराधिपतेरखिलं मधुरम्‌ ॥ २ ॥	madhurādhipaterakhilaṃ madhuram (2)	Everything is sweet about the Lord of Sweetness
वेणुर्मधुरो	veṇurmadhuro	(His) flute-playing is sweet
रेणुर्मधुरः	reṇurmadhuraḥ	(His) foot-dust is sweet
पाणिर्मधुरः	pāṇirmadhuraḥ	(His) hands are sweet
पादौ मधुरौ ।	pādau madhurau	(His) feet are sweet
नृत्यं मधुरं	nṛtyaṃ madhuraṃ	(His) dancing is sweet
सख्यं मधुरं	sakhyaṃ madhuraṃ	(His) friendship (company) is sweet
मधुराधिपतेरखिलं मधुरम्‌ ॥ ३ ॥	madhurādhipaterakhilaṃ madhuram (3)	Everything is sweet about the Lord of Sweetness
गीतं मधुरं	gītaṃ madhuraṃ	(His) song is sweet
पीतं मधुरं	pītaṃ madhuraṃ	(His) drinking is sweet
भुक्तं मधुरं	bhuktaṃ madhuraṃ	(His) eating is sweet
सुप्तं मधुरम्‌ ।	suptaṃ madhuraṃ	(His) sleeping is sweet
रूपं मधुरं	rūpaṃ madhuraṃ	(His) beautiful form is sweet
तिलकं मधुरं	tilakaṃ madhuraṃ	(His) Tilaka (Sandalwood paste mark on the forehead) is sweet
मधुराधिपतेरखिलं मधुरम् ‌॥ ४ ॥	madhurādhipaterakhilaṃ madhuram (4)	Everything is sweet about the Lord of Sweetness
करणं मधुरं	karaṇaṃ madhuraṃ	(His) deeds are sweet
तरणं मधुरं	taraṇaṃ madhuraṃ	(His) conquest (liberating) is sweet
हरणं मधुरं	haraṇaṃ madhuraṃ	(His) stealing is sweet
रमणं मधुरम् ‌।	ramaṇaṃ madhuram	(His) love-sports are sweet
वमितं मधुरं	vamitaṃ madhuraṃ	(His) oblations (offerings) are sweet
शमितं मधुरं	śamitaṃ madhuraṃ	(His) countenance is sweet
मधुराधिपतेरखिलं मधुरम्‌ ॥ ५ ॥	madhurādhipaterakhilaṃ madhuram (5)	Everything is sweet about the Lord of Sweetness
गुञ्जा मधुरा	guñjā madhurā	(His) gunja-berry necklace is sweet
माला मधुरा	mālā madhurā	(His) flower garland is sweet
यमुना मधुरा	yamunā madhurā	Yamuna river is sweet
वीची मधुरा ।	vīcī madhurā	and sweet are Yamuna's rippling waves or wind blowing there is sweet
सलिलं मधुरं	salilaṃ madhuraṃ	Her water is sweet
कमलं मधुरं	kamalaṃ madhuraṃ	and sweet are the lotus flowers also
मधुराधिपतेरखिलं मधुरम् ‌॥ ६ ॥	madhurādhipaterakhilaṃ madhuram (6)	Everything is sweet about the Lord of Sweetness
गोपी मधुरा	gopī madhurā	(His) gopis (damsels of Vraja) are sweet
लीला मधुरा	līlā madhurā	(His) frolickings are sweet
युक्तं मधुरं	yuktaṃ madhuraṃ	(His) union (meeting)/Strategy is sweet
मुक्तं मधुरम् ‌।	muktaṃ madhuram	(His) deliverance is sweet
दृष्टं मधुरं	dṛṣṭaṃ madhuraṃ	(His) sidelong glances/Bad people/Enemies are sweet
शिष्टं मधुरं	śiṣṭaṃ madhuraṃ	(His) etiquette/punishment is sweet
मधुराधिपतेरखिलं मधुरम् ‌॥ ७ ॥	madhurādhipaterakhilaṃ madhuram (7)	Everything is sweet about the Lord of Sweetness
गोपा मधुरा	gopā madhurā	(His) gopas (cowherd friends) are sweet
गावो मधुरा	gāvo madhurā	(His) cows are sweet
यष्टिर्मधुरा	yaṣṭirmadhurā	(His) cane (herding-stick) is sweet
सृष्टिर्मधुरा ।	sṛṣṭirmadhurā	(His) creation is sweet
दलितं मधुरं	dalitaṃ madhuraṃ	(His) destruction is sweet
फलितं मधुरं	phalitaṃ madhuraṃ	(His) accomplishment (fruition) is sweet
मधुराधिपतेरखिलं मधुरम्‌ ॥ ८ ॥	madhurādhipaterakhilaṃ madhuram (8)	Everything is sweet about the Lord of Sweetness

== In popular culture ==
Madhurāṣṭakam has been a very popular devotional song. Renowned singers, including the classical legend M. S. Subbulakshmi and semi-classical singer K. J. Yesudas have given classical and semi-classical renditions of the song. In the Odissi dance tradition, the Madhurāṣṭakam comprises an elegant and intoxicating theme for dance drama.

== See also ==
- Achyuta Shataka
- Mukundamala
- Gita Govinda
