= Edinburgh Mela =

Cultural festival in Edinburgh, Scotland

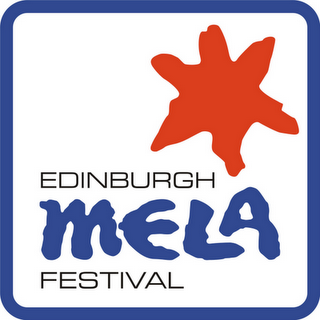
Former Mela Festival Logo

The Edinburgh Mela was an annual multi-cultural festival held in Edinburgh, Scotland, and is one of the 12 festivals that make up the Edinburgh Festival. The first mela, a Sanskrit word meaning "gathering" or "to meet", was held in 1995 at Meadowbank Stadium, and was organised by members of the city's minority ethnic communities. The festival moved to Pilrig Park in 2000, and to Leith Links in 2010. Running over three days in September, the event attracts around 20 to 25,000 people each year.

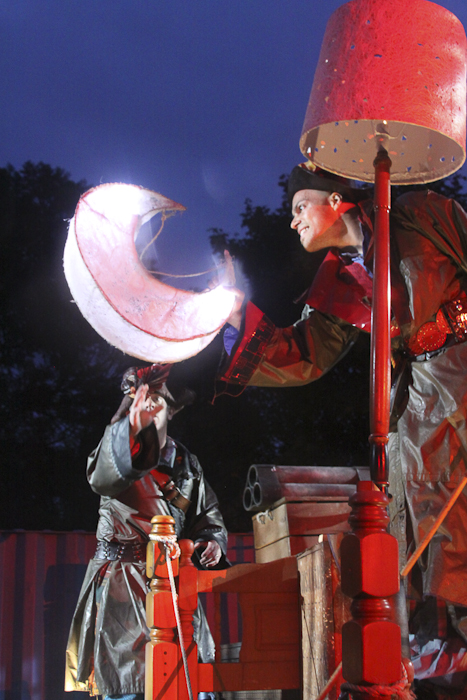
Outdoor Theatre at Edinburgh Mela

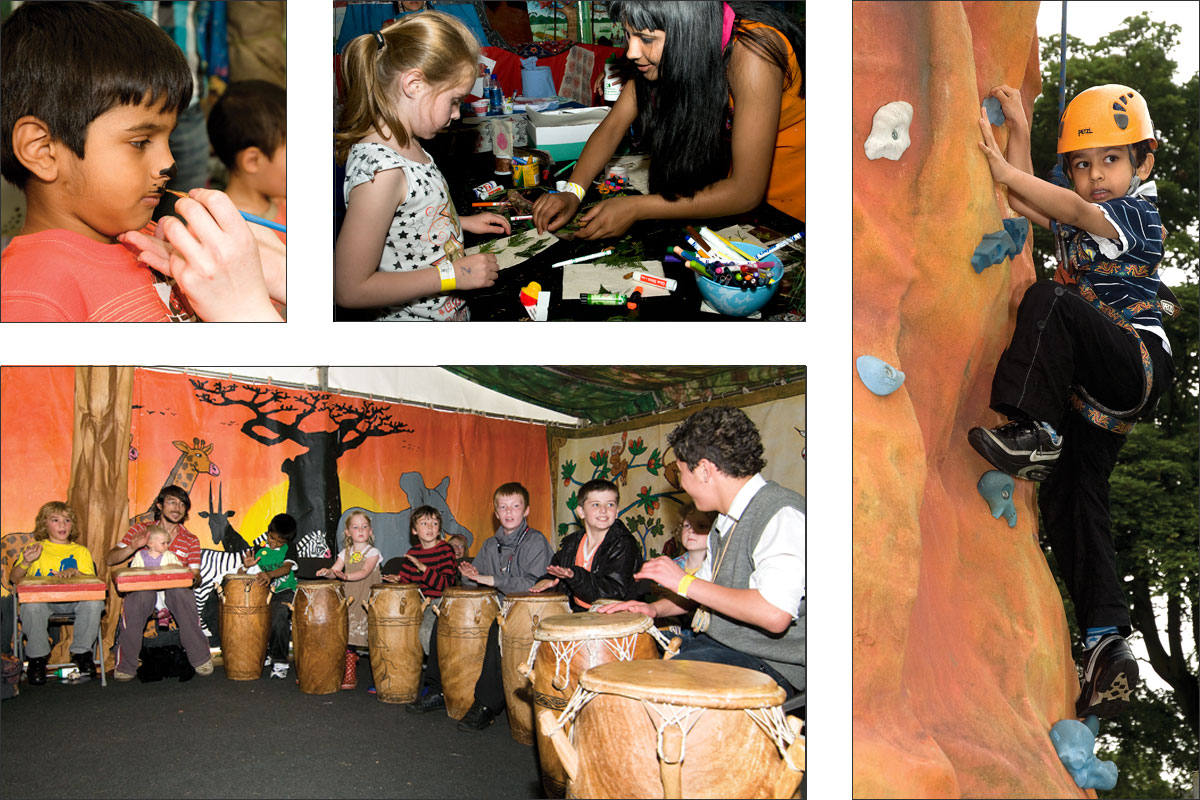
Children and Families at Edinburgh Mela

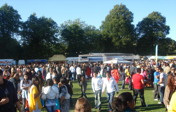
Edinburgh Mela

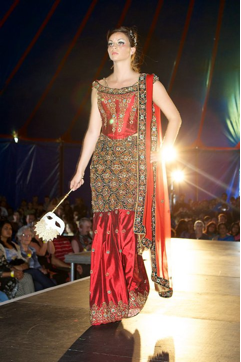
Fashion at Edinburgh Mela

== History ==
=== Origins of the Mela ===
Melas are south Asian events which have spread around the world from the south Asian subcontinent. Mela means 'gathering' and can describe festival, market, trade event, religious gathering and more. Melas are celebrated with music, dance, theatre, fashion, food and stalls. Melas are distinguished by their bringing together of south Asian cultures and those of other countries when promoted by south Asian Diasporas abroad. Melas first came to Britain in the late eighties.

=== Mela in Edinburgh ===
In 1995 people from Bangladesh, India, Pakistan and other traditions of the sub-continent established a Mela in Edinburgh. Chinese, African, and other groups were also involved. The first festival was held in Meadowbank Stadium.

The 2016, the Mela didn't take place due funding issues.

The Mela has not been held since 2019.

=== Locations ===
- Meadowbank Stadium 1995-1999
- Pilrig Park 2000-2007 & 2009
- Ocean Terminal 2008
- Leith Links 2010 – 2019

== Controversy ==
On 11 June 2019, an employment tribunal, brought by former Edinburgh Mela director Chris Purnell, found that evidence given by Mr Choudhury and former City of Edinburgh Labour Councillor Shami Khan was unsatisfactory. The tribunal said Mr Purnell had given his evidence "in a straightforward and measured way" and it was "entirely credible". It added: "In contrast, the manner in which Mr Khan and Mr Choudhury gave their evidence was often unsatisfactory. Both showed a reluctance to answer simple questions directly."

The tribunal awarded Mr Purnell £67,000 after it found he was unfairly dismissed from his role of director of the Mela festival, of which Mr Choudhury was vice-chair. Mr Purnell alleged that Mr Choudhury told him he should "watch himself" and "remember who pays his wages". And he said Mr Choudhury also criticised his body language and told him "directors come and go" and that he should not be taking credit for the success of the Mela and "acting as if he was doing the board a favour".

The 2016 Mela was cancelled but the festival went ahead in scaled-back form in 2017 and 2018. The council invited tenders to run a multicultural event in summer 2019.
