= Banamali Dasa =

Indian Odia poet (1720–1793)

- ବନମାଳୀ ଦାସ
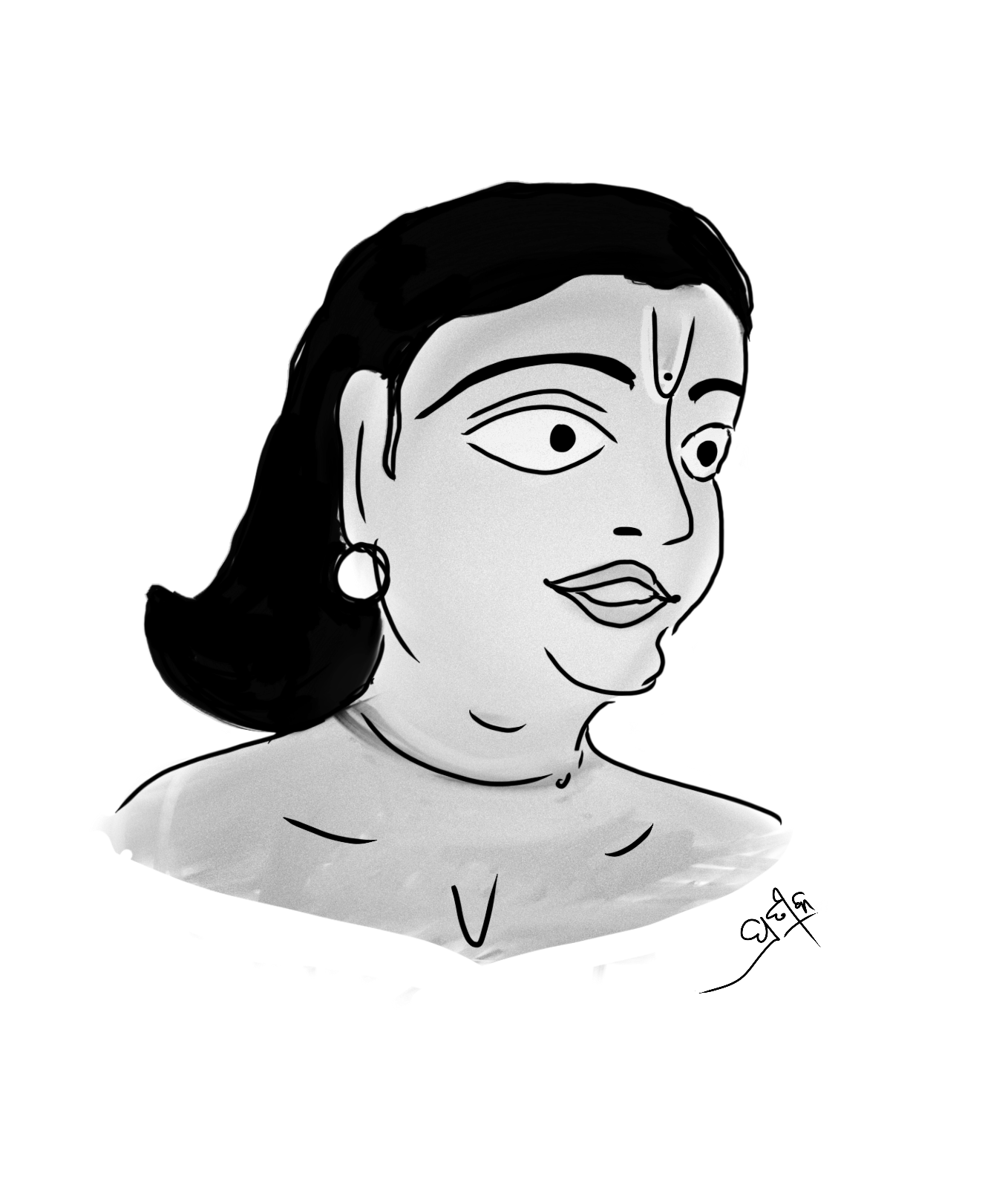
- An artistic recreation of Banamali Dasa.
- Born: Banamali Pattanayaka
- Citizenship: India
- Occupation: Poet
- Writing career
- Language: Odia
- Genre: Odissi music

Banamali Dasa (Odia: [bɔnɔmaːl̪i d̪aːsɔ]; 1720–1793) was an Indian medieval Odia bhakta-poet and composer of Odissi music from the state of Odisha. "Dinabandhu daitari", "Kede chanda jane lo sahi", and "Manima he etiki maguni mora" are some of his notable writings that are used in Odissi. His songs are popularly sung in festivals, public gatherings, and in Odissi dance. Banamali's compositions (especially chaupadis and jananas) are set to traditional Odissi ragas and talas and are used in the Odissi music repertoire. He is considered to be the foremost poet of the medieval Odia bhakti-literature. He started by writing rustic devotional poetry but later began composing "bhakti" poetry, which gained wider acceptance and popularity among contemporary poets. Banamali Dasa was patronised by Gajapati Birakishore Deva of Bhoi dynasty whom the poet also praised in his writings.

== Early life ==
As Dasa's birth and death are unrecorded, various researchers speculate various years. In a research publication, researcher Janaki Ballabh Mohanty has cited his birth year around 1720-30 and his death year as being unknown. Other publications have his birth year as 1720 and his death year as 1793.

He was born in a Karana family, as written in one of his earlier poems where he explicitly mentions his surname Pattanayaka, used by the Karanas of ancient Odisha. The surname is still in use in India.

He spent most of his life in Puri.

== Music ==
Banamali's creations are frequently sung in classical Odissi music concerts & enacted in the abhinaya part of Odissi dance. He is known to have composed over 400 songs; Odissi, Chhanda, Bhajana, Janana, Chautisa and more. He is not known to have written any single kavya, but rather a large number of individual songs. The Ragas used by Banamali in his works are unique ragas of the Odissi music tradition. Some of these ragas include:

Asabari, Bangala, Bangalasri, Baradi, Basanta, Basanta Kedara, Bhairaba, Bhairabi, Bhatiari, Bhupala, Bibhasha, Chakra Kedara, Chinta Kedara, Dakhina Kamodi, Desa Baradi, Desakhya, Dhanasri, Dhipa, Gadamalia, Gujjari, Jayanta, Jayanti, Jhinjoti, Kalyana, Kamodi, Kaphi, Karnata, Kasmira, Kedara, Kedaragouda, Khambaja, Khanda Bangalasri, Kolahala, Kousika, Krusna Kedara, Kumbha Kamodi, Kumbha Kedara, Kusuma Kedara, Lalita Kamodi, Lalita Kedara, Madana Kedara, Madhusri, Malaba, Mangala, Mangala Baradi, Mangala Kedara, Marua, Matiari, Mohana, Mohana Kedara, Mukhabari, Nalinigouda, Natakurangi, Paraja, Pattamanjari, Punnaga, Purabi, Ranabije, Rasakadamba, Rasakedara, Saberi, Sankarabharana, Saranga, Sauri, Sindhu Kamodi, Soka Kamodi, Sri, Suratha, Todi, Todiparaja.

== Selected works ==
=== Poetry ===
- "Dinabandhu daitari"
- "Manima he eitiki maguni mora"
- "Kede chanda jane lo sahi"
- "Dukhanasana he sukha na paili dine"
- "Jaya Jagannatha he Jasoda kumara"
- "Ke Murali Bajauchhi Brundabane Go"
