= Jandhyala Papayya Sastry =

Indian writer (1912-1992)

- Born: 4 August 1912; Kommuru village, Guntur district, India
- Died: 21 June 1992 (aged 79)
- Occupation: Lecturer
- Spouse: Anasuyamma
- Children: 2 sons and 1 daughter
- Writing career
- Genres: Writer, poet
- Notable works: Pushpa Vilapam, Kunthi Kumari
- Notable awards: Honorary doctorate from Sri Venkateswara University, Tirupati

Jandhyala Papayya Sastry (4 August 1912 – 21 June 1992) was an eminent Telugu writer and lyricist. He was popularly known as Karunasri because his writings expressively show compassion (Karuna or Kāruṇyam), one of the nine Rasas. His famous kavyas include Pushpa Vilapam and Kunthi Kumari.

Karunasri's poetry focused on themes of human experience and social issues. His works Udayasri, Vijayasri and Karunasri went through multiple reprints and became among his best-known literary publications. Karunasri described Udayasri, Vijayasri and Karunasri respectively as representing his emotions, intellect and life experiences.

“Udayasri” takes us from darkness to twilight;

“Vijayasri” from twilight to light;

and “Karunasri” from light to delight – The bliss of god.

Karunasri is a combination of tradition and modernity, spirituality and social awareness.

== Brief life sketch ==
Papayya Sastry was born in Kommuru village, Pedanandipadu mandal, Guntur district in 1912. After primary and middle school education in his village.

Papayya Sastry has about 27 works, which include Pushpa Vilapam, Kunthi Kumari, Karunasri, Paaki Pilla, Udayasri, Vijayasri, Omar Khayyam, Aruna Kiranalu, Telugu Baala and Kalyana Kalpavalli. His Pushpa Vilapam was born out of his anger towards a visitor, who began eating the petals of a rose from the flower vase on the table, while the poet had been in his prayer room. Karunasri was born out of his stream of his thoughts when he visited the rare Buddhist sculpture, Mahachaitya and pillars at Amaravathi village, Guntur district. He saw the plight of a scavenger girl and wrote Paaki Pilla (1928) at the age of 16 years. His compositions are timeless; they move the soul. The language is very simple and any common man with basic understanding of the Telugu language can easily understand the depth of his expression. Ghantasala rendered his Pushpa Vilapam and Kunti Kumari. The lyrics and Ghantasala's voice are said to make people cry with pity.

Papayya Sastry acted as Nandi Thimmana without wearing any make-up in Bhuvana Vijayam during Ugadi celebrations. He became a devotee of Satya Sai Baba and Viswaguru Viswamji during his later years.

Papayya Sastry was married to Anasuyamma. They had two sons and a daughter.

Parents: Mahalakshmi and Paradesaiah

Wife: Anasuya Devi

Sons: Dr. Jaya Krishna Bapuji, M.A., Ph.D. (Spouse: Subhashini) Venkata Ramana M.Com., M.Ed. (Spouse: Varasri B.sc B.Ed.)

Daughter: Vijaya Lakshmi, M.A., B.Ed. (Ch. Nageswara Rao, M.A., M.Ed.)

Address: 3-22-6, Kalyana Bharati, Ravindra Nagar, Guntur- 522006

Education: Rashtra Bhasha Visarada 1934 Ubhaya Bhasha Praveena 1936 Hindi Bhasha Praveena 1940

Teachers: Sri Kuppa Anjaneya Sastry, Cherukur (Grammar) Sri Bhamidipati Subrahmanya Sastry, Mopidevi (Literature) Sri Jammalamadaka Madhavarama Sarma, Guntur (Rhetoric)

Profession as Teacher: Stall Girls High School, Guntur – 4 years, Sri RamaKrishna High School, Amaravati – 4 years

Profession as Lecturer: A.C. College, Guntur – 22 years, Mahaveer College, Guntur – 3 years, Hindu College, Guntur – 2 years

Editor: Chief Editor, Potana Bhagavatam Project – T.T.D

== Works Published ==
Bala Koteswara Tharavali (Poetry) 1934

Udayasri (Part I) (Poetry) 1944

ArunaKiranalu (Lyrics) 1945

Karunamayi (Drama) 1945

Vijayasri (Based on Maha Bharat) Poetry 1948

Ahimsa Jyothi (Homage to Ghandhiji) Compilation 1948

Karunasri Part I (Story of Boddha) Poetry 1950

Veera Bharati (Heroic Stories) 1950

Udaya Bharati Children's Text Book 1950

Bharata Pratibha Biographies 1951

Charumitra Playlet 1951

Tenugu Seema Stories for Children 1952

Udayasri Part II Poetry 1952

Kalayana Kadambari Prose 1952

Prema Moorti Prose 1953

Swanna Vasavadatta Drama 1954

Ahimsa Jyothi Novelette 1955

Mahati Stories for Children 1955

Mandaramu Stories for Children 1955

Kalyana Kalpavalli Anthology of Old Poetry 1958

Bala Bharati Stories for Children 1958

Guru Dakshina Stories for Children 1958

Bangaru Padmam Playlets 1959

Indra Dhanussu Stories for children 1960

Chandamaamalo Kundelu Stories for children 1960

Kalayan Dampatulu Stories for children 1960

Telugu Baala Moral Poems 1961

Srinivasa vachanam children's text book 1961

Ganesa Pancha Ratnamaala Compilation 1961

Saptarshi Ramayanam Translation 1962

Pooja Pushpalu Stories for children 1962

Naluguru Mitrulu Novelette 1962

Simham Mechina Chitteluka Stories for children 1962

Adrushtamichina Adbhuta Deepam Novelette 1963

Sakuntala Drama 1963

Vasantasena Novelette 1963

Dwadasa Jyotirlinga Manimanjari Compilation 1964

Adikavi vaalmiki Stories For Children 1965

Tyaga Moorti - Part I Story of Christ 1966

Tyaga Moorti - Part II Story of Christ 1966

Damayanti Novelette 1967

Sailaja Stories for Children 1967

Udayasri Part III Poetry 1968

Udayasri Part IV Poetry 1969

Kalayana Kanaka Durga Translation 1972

Srinivasodaharanam Poetry 1973

Bangaru Mungisa Stories for Children 1974

Matsya Yantram Stories for Children 1975

Maha Veerudu Novelette 1975

Udayasri Part V Poetry 1979

Bhagirathudu Novelette 1980

Kankanti Kavita Vaibhavam Commentary 1980

Potana Bhagavatam Commentary on I canto 1982

Bhagavata vaijayantika Essays 1982

Prasanna Katha vipanchi Commentary 1983

Ananda Lahari Poetry 1986

Amar Khayam Poetry 1987

Poola vaanalu – Tene Sonalu Commentary 1987

Anuraga Lahari Lyrics 1989

Sai Sudhalahari Devotional Poems 1990

Bhavya Bharathi Stories of Children 1990

Arsha Bahrathi Stories of Children 1990

Purana Bharathi Stories of Children 1990

Adarsha Bharathi Stories of Children 1990

Kalyana Bharathi Stories of Children 1990

Dalita Bharathi Stories of Children 1990

Veera Bharathi Stories of Children 1990

Viswa Bharathi Stories of Children 1990

Pratibha Bharathi Stories of Children 1990

Vinoda Bharathi Stories of Children 1990

Chamatkara Bharathi Stories of Children 1990

Upadesa Bharathi Stories of Children 1990

Muddu Balasiksha Text Book For Children 1991

Padmavati Srinivasam Novelette 1991

Viswa Sandesa Lahari Moral Poems 1991

Karunasri Part II (Story of Buddha) Poetry 1991

== Titles ==
Papayya Sastry was awarded Honorary Doctorate from Sri Venkateswara University, Tirupati 12th Mar 1984.

Kavita Kala Nidhi Awarded By Sahiti Sravanti, Rajole 5th Sep 1982.

Kavi Kulalankara Awarded by N.K.V Peettam, Bapatla 17th Apr 1989

== Awards ==
Telugu Akadamy Award Madras 29th Apr 1985

Rasamayi Award Hyderabad 27th Jun 1987

Abinandana Award Hyderabad 21st Sep 1987

Subhangi Award Hyderabad 27th Jan 1989

Abhiruchi Award Ongole 9th Apr 1989

Nalam Krishnaraya Award Bapatla 17th Apr 1989

Sindhuja Award Secunderabad 8th Nov 1989

Dr.Paidi Lakshmaiah Award Hyderabad 24th Jun 1989

Mahamantri Madanna Award Hyderabad 16th Mar 1990

Yarlagadda Ranganayakulu Award Madras 26th Oct 1990

Dr. Burgula Rama Krishna Rao Award Hyderabad 13th Mar 1991

== Memorable Events ==
Editor for illustrated literary monthly “subhashini” 1951 – 1953

Participated in All India Poets Conference, New Delhi 24th Jan 1961

Divine felicitation by Bhagavan Sri Satya Sai Baba, Puttaparti 25th Sep 1972

Special Member – Andhra Pradesh Sahitya Akademi, Hyderabad 29th Jan 1977

Felicitation with Gold Flowers and Gold Bracelet, Vijayawada 27th Jun 1982

Andhra Pradesh Sahitya Akademi Award 30th Jan 1983

Men of letters Fellowship – Cultural affairs 1st Apr 1984

Honoring By President of India, Sri Gnani Jail Singh 25th Apr 1987

Releasing function of 50th edition (Golden jubilee) of “Udayasri”, And 25th edition (Silver Jubilee) of “Vijayasri” and “Karunasri” by Hon. Andhra Pradesh Chief minister Sri N.T. Ramarao 27th Jun 1987

An appreciation in the Half yearly Magazine “Chitanya Kavita” 1st Apr 1990

More than 1.25.000 Copies of “Telugu Bala” Book were sold. More than 50,000 Copies of “Udayasri” Ist Part were sold. More than 25,000 Copies of “Vijayasri” were sold. More than 25,000 Copies of “Karunasri” were sold.

The Poems Pushpa vilapam, Kunti kumari and ananda lahari were translated into English and Hindi by Dr. Amarendra and Dr. P. Surya Naraya Bhanu respectively

Delivered thousands of literary lectures throughout India.

Advaita Murthy, Sandhyasri, Pushpa vilaapam, Kunti kumari, Anjali, Karunamayi and Prabhati poems were sung by Ghantasala, and melodious music by His Master's Voice.

Divine felicitation by Sri Viswayogi Viswamji on 6th Aug 1988 at guntur, to celebrate the completion of 60 years of literary endeavor.

Review along with cover page photo in the monthly magazine “Pathasala” on 1st Nov 1988

The director Rajaji made a Video film on “Pushpa Vilapam” on 16th Mar 1990

Honoring by Telugu University Hyderabad for “Amar Khayam” on 17th Apr 1990

Honoring by prof. C. Narayana Reddy on his 60th birthday celebrations on 26th Jul 1991

Honoring by Minister of Education, A.P, Sri P.V. Ranga Rao for his book Purana Bharathi on 8th Sep 1991

Several times acted as Mukku Timmana in Bhuvana vijayam, Nannaya in Bharatavataranam, Chemakura Venkata kavi in Indira Mandiram, and Potana in Brahma Sabha.

== Literary Criticism and Research on his works ==
Smt. P. Sarojini devi did research on the topic “Vijayasri Paryalokanam” and got Masters in Philosophy from Nagarjuna university in 1979.

Sri D.S.V Subrahmanyam did research on the topic “Karunasri Krutula Samagra Pariseelanam” and got Doctorate (Ph.D.) from Banaras Hindu University in 1980

Sri G.A.N Raju did research on the topic “Karunasri Kavyanuseelanam” and got Masters in Philosophy from Andhra university in 1983.

Dr. R. Surya Narayan Murty wrote a special book entitled “ Karunasri Kavya Samiksha” in 1955

Sri G. Prakasa Rao wrote a special book entitled “Karunasri Kavitasri” in 1974

The members of Ramaraja Bhushana Sahitya Parishat, bhimavaram compiled a souvenir on Karunasri entitled “akshropaharam” in 1988

Dr. J. Suman Babu wrote a special research book entitled “Karunasri Kavita Sowrabham” in 1990

Prof. Divakarla Venkatavadhani, Prof. Siva Sankara Swamy, Prof. Bayya Surya Narayana, Prof. Gandham Appa Rao, Dr.Nanduri Rama Krishnamacharya, Dr. Amarendra, Dr.P.Surya Narayana Bhanu, Dr. Dasarathi, Dr.P.G. Krishna Murty, Dr. K. Rama Mohana Roy, Sri Sphurthisri, Sri Y. Balarama Murthy, Sri. Srivatsava, Sri Mahantaiah, Sri G.N. Murty, Sri Pulicherla Samba Siva Rao, Sri Nagalla Gurna Prasada Rao, Sri Gali Nasara Reddy, Sri Mannav Giridhara Rao, Sri P.V.S. Patro, Sri P. Nageswara Rao, Sri Sikhamani, Sri Supani, Sri Seerapani, Sri M.K. Sugam Babu, Sri Smitasri, Sri Mohan, Sri B. Mastan Rao, Sri Y. Jaganmohan Rao, Smt. Ch. Bhavani Devi, Smt Lata etc., written articles in Telugu, English and in Hindi by appreciating Karunasri's work.

== Opinions of Contemporary Literary Luminaries ==
"Dr. Karunasri is a wizard who molded the poem as a word, as a song, as a saying and as an inspiration. He is perfect gentleman with compassion in his eyes and lyricism in his poetry. The very fact that his “Udayasri” had more than 50 reprints is sample proof of his great capabilities."

- GnyanaPeetta Prof. C. Narayana Reddy

"Karunasree is famous for his lucid, sweet style of expression. Udayasri is his magnum opus."

- Dr. Papineni Sivasankar, Sahitya Akademi Awardee

"He created in Telugu poetry, a peculia style of his own, excusing classical splendor and lyrical sweetness. His works like Udayasri, Vijaytasri and Karunasri are monumental contributions to Telugu Literature."

- KalaPrapurna Madhunapantula Satya Narayana Sastry

"The poems of Udayasri will live in Telugu Literature as long as Telugu is spoken in this land, and as long as Krishna, Godavari, Tungabadra and Suvarnamukhi rivers flow in this land."

- Dr. Nanduri Rama Krishnamacharyulu

"Karunasri is the only poet who reflects the pulse of the Telugu people in his poetry after the great Bammera Potana."

- Prf. B. Rama Raju

"To tell in a nutshell, Karunasri is the twilight ray of romantic poetry. He is emperor of sweet words that dance on the lips of the Andhra people. He is a classical genius who showed that poetry springs from the union of music and literature."

- Guntur Seshendra Sharma

"The Poetical works of karunasri were not written by mere words but by poetry itself. They are an index of turmoil of man."

- Dr. Sanjiva Dev

"Among contemporary poets Dr. Karunasri belongs to top rank. His poetry reflects the compassion of buddhism and self enlightenment."

- Prof. S. V. Joga Rao

"His contemplative poetry is enchant and enticing."

- Prof. T. Donappa

"The wonderful pen of Karunasri is dipped in ambrosia."

- Chief Minister of Andhra Pradesh, Padmasri Dr. N.T. Rama Rao

"The poetry of Dr.Karunasri is as heart moving as the melodious rendering of his songs by Ghantasala, the Ghandarva Gayaka."

- Padama Bhushana Dr. Akkineni Nageswara Rao

"The very fact that I have named my daughters as Vijayasri and Udayasri reveals the deep impression of his works on me."

- Dr. Gummadi Venkateswara Rao

"Simplicity, Tenderness and Pleasantness are the natural ornaments of his poetry."

- Dr. Devula Palli Ramanuja Rao

"He is an emperor among modern andhra poets. His works are musical."

- Dr. Utukuri Lakshmi Kantamma

"The Golden jubilee of Udayasri is a golden chapter in Telugu literature. He has illuminated the Telugu poetical world with his poetical rays."

- Dr. Prasada Raya Kulapati

"According to Dr. Prasada Raya Kulapati, Udayasri is considered a notable work in modern Telugu poetry."

- Dr. Amarendra

"In this age the 50th reprint of his Udayasri can gauge where the novel is reigning the glamour of his poetry."

- Dr. S. V. Bhujangaraya Sarma
