= Baladeba Ratha =

Odia poet

Kabisurjya Baladeba Ratha
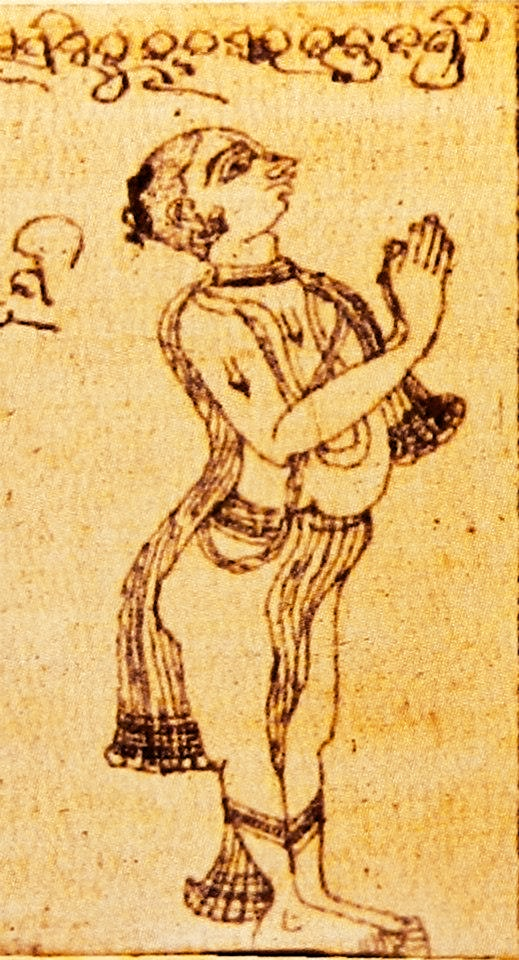
- Kabisurjya Baladeba Ratha depicted in a palm leaf manuscript by 19th-century chitrakāra master Raghunath Prusti
- Born: Athagadapatana, Kabisuryanagar Ganjam, Odisha, India
- Died: Athagada Patana Ganjam, Odisha, India
- Writing career
- Language: Odia
- Genre: Odissi music
- Notable works: Kishorachandrananda Champu, Ratnakara Champu, Chandrakala, Sarpa Janana

Kabisurjya Baladeba Ratha (alternatively spelled Kabisurya, Kavisurya Baladev Rath, Kabisūrjya Baḷadeba Ratha, Odia: [kɔbisurd͡ʒjɔ bɔl̪ɔd̪ebɔ ɾɔt̪ʰɔ]; c. 1789 – 1845) was an Indian poet who wrote in the Odia language, and a composer and musician of Odissi music, most known as poet-composer of the Champu. Kabisurjya has composed hundreds of songs in the tradition of Odissi music, employing unique traditional ragas & talas. His magnum opus Kisorachandrananda Champu is a cornerstone of the Odissi music repertoire & Kabisurjya is widely renowned for his masterful compositions. He wrote in both Sanskrit and Odia. His works are known for their devotional quotient and he is the credited founder of the Dhumpa Sangita tradition.

== Early life ==
He was born at Athagadapatana, Kabisuryanagar, Ganjam, Odisha. Baladeva Ratha's mother died when he was ten years old. He was brought up by his maternal grand father, Tripurari Hota in Athagada (who also taught him Sanskrit and Odia literature). He married at the age of 15. After his father's death, he moved to the nearby Jalantara state. The prince of Jalantara, Rama Chandra Chhotaraya encouraged his literary creations and gave him the title 'Kabisurjya', meaning 'The Sun among Poets.'

== Literary works ==
A person singing the "kehi sariki, prabhu pane nilādrī keśarīki" poem of Baladeba Ratha

Ratha was an Odissi musician and scholar. He composed poems as a Vaishnava, in devotion to Lord Vishnu. He was associated with a group of poets, which included Dinakrushna Dasa and Abhimanyu Samantasinghara. His best-known works include Kabisurjya Granthavali, Kabisurjya Geetabali and Kisora Chandrananda Chaupadi-Chautisa, which combines the two literary forms of chaupadi (a poem having four stanzas (though the term came to refer to any short song in latter times), and chautisa (a 34-stanza poem where every stanza begins with a new letter of the Odia alphabet). Kisora Chandrananda Champu is noted for its emotional quotient and the role it played in enforcing the riti school of Sanskrit literature. He was also the author of several champus including Ratnakara Champu, Premodaya Champu and Kisora Chandrananda Champu. Kisora Chandrananda Champu has both Odia and Sanskrit compositions and it was the Odia part of the work that has been credited with cementing his literary reputation in the language.

== Dhumpa sangita ==
Ratha is thought to have invented the dhumpa, a bamboo percussion instrument, that accompanies the Odia folk art form of dhumpa sangita. The dhumpa accompanies recitations of his songs called dhumpa sangeeta. Many of his poetic pieces, especially the champu are set to dance in Odissi.

== Death and Commemoration ==
Ratha died in Brahmapur (Berhampur, Odisha) in the year 1845. Dasarathi Das' Kabisurjya Baladeba Ratha is a biography that examines his life and contributions to Indian literature. Kabisuryanagar, formerly Boirani, a town in the Ganjam district of Odisha has been named in his honour.
