= Sangita Narayana =

17th-century Indian classical musical treatise

The Sangita Narayana (IAST: 'Sangīta Nārāyana') is a 17th-century musical treatise belonging to the tradition of Odissi music (a genre of classical music in India), written by musician Kabiratna Purusottama Misra and attributed to Gajapati Sarbagya Jagannatha Narayana Deva of Paralakhemundi. It is one of the most important musical treatises discovered from Odisha and is one of the fundamental texts followed in Odissi music till date. The treatise was first published by the Odisha Sangeet Natak Akademi in 1966, followed by a critical edition published by the Indira Gandhi National Centre for the Arts in 2009. Manuscripts of the work are found across India, indicating its national circulation. In 1987, Jonathan Katz in his D. Phil. thesis extensively analysed the musicological portions of the Sangitanarayana.

== Author ==
Purusottama Misra hailed from a family of musicians and litterateurs. He is known to have composed another musical treatise by the name of Talasangraha, which is unavailable. In the Sangita Narayana, several older treatises are cited, including Vishnu Purana, Narada Samhita, Shiva Samhita, Parshurama Samhita, Brihaddeshi, Kohaliyam, Sangita Ratnakara, Panchamasara Samhita, Sangita Ratnamala, Sangita Damodara, Sangita Kaumudi, Gita Prakasa among others. The work is dated to 1646-50 AD by Dr. Mamata Mishra based on comparative study with the work of the Narayana Misra's Sangita Sarani, Narayana being the son of Purusottama. Prof. Mandakranta Bose too dates it to the 17th century.

The patron of the work Gajapati Jagannatha Narayana Deva was the erstwhile ruler of Paralakhemundi, one of the largest and most powerful kingdoms in ancient Odisha. The king identifies himself as a disciple of Kabiratna Purusottama Misra in a graceful tribute to his Guru.

== Contents ==
The text deals with the conventional trio of gita, vadya, nrtya that form sangita and it does so in exemplary detail. The example songs given to illustrate points are mostly dedicated to Gajapati Narayana Deva. Like most Odia authors, Misra begins his treatise with a customary invocation to Jagannatha, the venerable deity of Odisha.

He cites certain musicologists preceding him, like Harinayaka, author of Sangitasara and Krusnadasa Badajena Mahapatra, author of Gita Prakasa.

The ragas described in the Sangita Narayana are Sri, Natta, Karnāta, Rebagupta, Basanta, Bhairaba, Bangāla, Soma, Āmrapanchama, Kāmoda, Megha, Drābidagouda, Turaska Gouda, Barādi, Drabida Barādi, Desi Barādi, Suddha Barādi, Gujjari, Sourastra Gujjari, Dakhina Gujjari, Todi, Mālabasri, Saindhabi, Debakiri, Rāmakiri, Prathama Manjari, Nattā, Belābali, Goudi, Gouda, Nāta, Ghantāraba, Nata Nārāyana, Bhupati, Sankarābharana, Madhyamādi, Mallāra, Desapāla, Mālaba, Andolita (Hindola), Nagadhwani, Gundakiri, Khambhābati, Madhyamādi, Mallāra, Desapāla, Mālaba, Megharanji, Manju Kalyānikā, Chhāyātodi, Pratāpabelābali, Pourabi, Nattamallārika, Ballabi, Gouri, Saranga, Āsābari and Mukhābari. Most of these ragas continue to be popular in present-day Odissi music repertoires.

== Read more ==
- Sangita Narayana published by Odisha Sangeet Natak Akademi, 1966. Edited by Pt Banambara Acharya, Kabichandra Dr. Kalicharan Patnaik and Pt Kedarnath Mahapatra.
