= Gita Prakasa =

Odissi musical treatise

The Gitaprakasa (IAST: 'Gītaprakāśa'; "Illuminator of music") is a 16th-century musical treatise belonging to the tradition of Odissi music, written by the musicologist Krusnadasa Badajena Mahapatra. Mahapatra was a court musician of Gajapati Mukundadeba. It is the second earliest music treatise discovered from Odisha. The Gita Prakasa is one of the cornerstones of the Odissi music tradition and is widely quoted by later authorities such as the Sangita Narayana and the Sangita Muktabali.

The treatise was first published by the Odisha Sangeet Natak Akademi in 1983, based on two palm leaf manuscripts preserved in the Odisha State Museum, Bhubaneswar. Both manuscripts were collected from Puri district, Odisha and were roughly dated to the 18th century.

== Author ==
Krusnadesa Badajena Mahapatra was a 16th-century musician par excellence from Odisha. The author reveals no information about his family, age or any other details in his text. However, the period to which he belonged can be determined by internal evidence. A song authored by Raya Ramananda on Gajapati Prataparudra Deba has been quoted in the Gitaprakasa. Another musicologist Haladhara Misra refers to Krusnadasa's Gitaprakasa in his treatise called Sangitakalpalatika, composed between 1623 and 1647 AD. Since Mahapatra himself eulogises Gajapati Mukundadeba, it is inferred that he was a contemporary of the king and most probably served as a court musician. There has only been one Gajapati in the history of Odisha bearing the name Mukunda. He was the last independent ruler of Odisha from 1559 to 1568 AD. Hence, Krusnadasa can be dated to the same period.

In the year 1565, Mahapatra presented his music in the court of Akbar. Abul Fazl extolls a certain 'Mahapattar' in his Ain-i-Akbari. The Akbarnama also makes mention of a "Mahapattar who adorned the court of Akbar, the great Mogul and who was unrivalled in the arts of Indian poetry and music". The surname Mahapatra is one of the most popular surnames of Odisha, found since the Ganga period. In several inscriptions from the 12th century AD this surname is mentioned. Badajena was another such title in vogue in Odisha. Both titles are popular and found even now. It is certain that the Mahapattar Abul Fazl mentions can be none other than Krusnadasa.

== Contents ==
The Gitaprakasa only deals with aspects of vocal music. The treatise is meticulous in its analysis of songs and their classification. The text is also replete with many examples, a significant portion of them having been composed by the author himself. Like most Odia authors, Mahapatra begins his treatise with a customary invocation to Jagannatha, the venerable deity of Odisha.

He cites certain musicologists preceding him, like Harinayaka, author of Sangitasara.

The ragas mentioned in the Gitaprakasa are Sri, Natta, Karnāta, Rebagupta, Basanta, Suddhabhairaba, Bangāla, Soma, Āmrapanchama, Kāmoda, Megha, Drābidagauda, Barādi, Gujjari, Todi, Mālabasri, Saindhabi, Debakiri, Rāmakiri, Prathamamanjari, Nattā, Belābali, Gaudi, Gauda, Karnnātabangāla, Desi, Dhannāsi, Kolāhala, Ballāli, Desākhya, Sābari, Khambhābati, Harsapuri, Mallāri, Hunchhikā, Madhyamādi, Mallāra, Desapāla, Mālaba, Hindola, Bhairaba, Nāgadhwani, Gondakiri, Lalitā, Chhāyātodi, Pratāpabelābali, Guptabasanta, Paurabi, Nattamallārika, Māravi, Ballabi, Gauri, Kalyāni, Karnātika, Āsābari and Mukhābari. Many of these ragas continue to be popular in present-day Odissi music repertoires.
