= Melā =

Sanskrit word meaning "gathering" or "to meet" or a "fair"

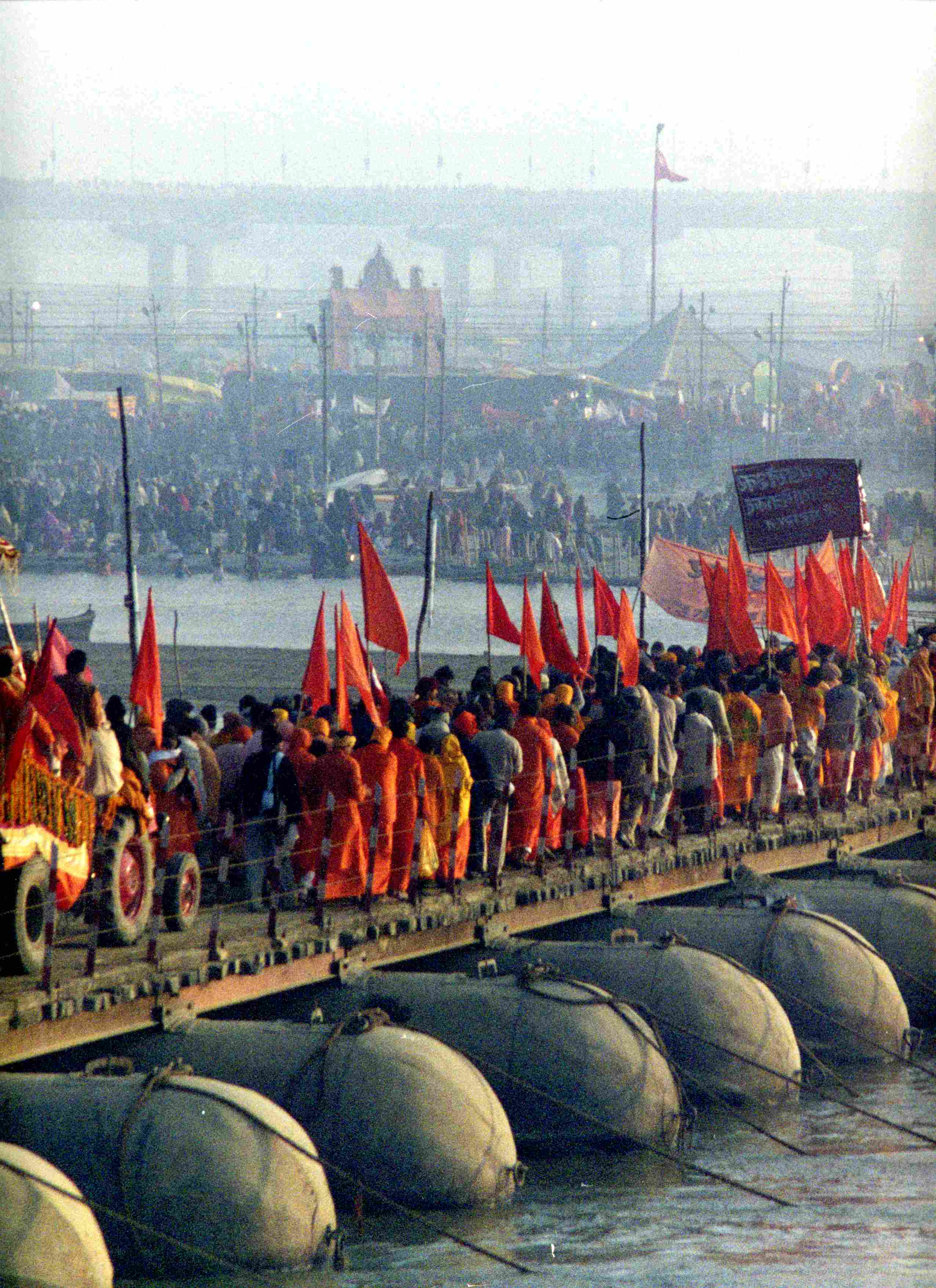
A procession of Akharas marching .....over a temporary bridge over the Ganges river, Kumbh Mela at Allahabad, 2001

Mela (Sanskrit: मेला) is a Sanskrit word meaning "gathering" or "to meet" or a "fair". It is used in the Indian subcontinent for all sizes of gatherings and can be religious, commercial, cultural or sport-related. In rural traditions melas or village fairs were (and in some cases still are) of great importance. This led to their export around the world by South Asian diaspora communities wishing to bring something of that tradition to their new countries.

In recent times "mela" also popularly refers to shows and exhibitions. It can be theme-based, promoting a particular culture, art or skill. Generally at "melas" people can find eateries, entertainment activities, shops and games. Most children in the Indian subcontinent have fond memories of going to a mela.

The Kumbh Mela, held every twelve years, at Prayagraj, Haridwar, Nashik and Ujjain is one of the largest fairs in India, where over 50 million people gathered in January 2001, making it the largest gathering anywhere in the world.

== Notable Melas in South Asia ==
=== India ===
- Gangasagar Mela at Sagar Island
- Gita Mahotsav
- Haridwar Kumbh Mela
- Jhiri Mela
- Kapal Mochan Mela, Haryana
- Kumbh Mela
- Mela Maghi at Muktsar
- Minjar Mela
- Perfect Health Mela
- Nashik-Trimbakeshwar Simhastha
- Prayagraj Kumbh Mela
- Pushkar Fair
- Pushkaram – the river festivals of Karnataka, Andhra Pradesh and Telangana.
- Ratha-Yatra Mela
- Sonepur Cattle Fair
- Shaheedi Jor Mela
- Ujjain Simhastha

== Bangladesh ==
- Banijya Mela
- Ekushey Boi Mela
- Boishakhi Mela
- Muharram Mela
- Lalon Mela
- Maizbhandari Mela

== Pakistan ==
- Mela Chiraghan
- Lok Mela

== Usage outside South Asia ==
In modern usage outside South Asia it has become a term that shows widespread diversity of interpretation, just as has been the case in South Asia. One can find a Nepalese mela in the US, or a Bengali mela in London, such as the Boishakhi Mela. The Boishakhi Mela is the largest open-air Asian festival in Europe and the largest Bengali festival outside of Bangladesh. After the Notting Hill Carnival, it is the second-largest street festival in the United Kingdom, attracting over 80,000 visitors from across the country. Many melas are wider intercultural (though mainly Asian) festivals incorporating music, dance, food and other aspects of mainstream culture.

Since the 1980s an increasing number of melas have regularly been held in larger towns outside south Asia, especially in the UK and North America. The larger melas tend to be those with larger ethnic minority populations, but many melas are held in communities with small South Asian diasporas. Community ownership of these melas is important to the South Asian communities, who see them as opportunities to share their cultural heritage with the mainstream. They are opportunities for bridge-building and community-building and can perform a strong socially cohesive function.

More successful outside-of-Asia melas tend to have a strongly diversified funding base with private/public/third sector collaboration. Public money is often spent on the melas. This reflects the mela organisers' and public authorities' joint conviction that, as in the sub-continent, melas are for everyone.

== Notable Melas outside the Asian subcontinent ==
- Milan The Hague (The Netherlands)
- Oslo Mela Festival (Norway)
- Belfast Mela (UK)
- Birmingham Mela (UK)
- Boishakhi Mela (UK)
- Bradford Mela (UK)
- Cardiff Mela (UK)
- Edinburgh Mela (UK)
- Glasgow Mela (UK)
- London Mela (UK)
- Manchester Mega Mela (UK)
- Middlesbrough Mela (UK)
- Newcastle Mela (UK)
- Nottingham Mela (UK)
- Preston Mela (UK)
- Southampton Mela (UK)
- Brooklyn Mela, Coney Island Ave, New York (US)
- Punjabi Mela, Centreville, VA (US)

== See also ==
- Parikrama
- Yatra
- List of Melas in Nepal
