= List of Odia films of the 1980s =

A list of films produced by the Ollywood film industry based in Bhubaneswar and Cuttack in the 1980s:

Title	Director	Cast	Genre	Notes
1980
Danda Balunga	Mohammed Mohsin	Uttam Mohanty, Aparajita Mohanty		
Alibha Daga	Ramaraman Padhi	Suresh Mahapatra, Anita Das. Tandra Roy		
Anuraag	Nitai Palit	Ajit Das, Malvika Mohanty		
Maa O Mamata	Prashanta Nanda	Prashanta Nanda, Mahasweta Roy		
Anuradha	Shashidar	Raghu Misra, Jaya Swami		
Aparichita	Sadhu Meher	Sarat Pujari, Aparajita Mohanty		
Maana Abhiman	Biswajeet Das	Uttam Mohanty, Jairam Samal		
Agni Parikshya	Balal Sen	Sriram Panda, Mahasweta Roy		
Alibha Daga	Rama Nath Padhi	Suresh Mahapatra, Anita Das, Tandra Roy		
Bata Abata	Brundaban Jena	Ajit Das, Bijaya Jena		
Jai Maa Mangala	Akshya Mohanty	Chakrapani, Roja Ramani		
Rama Balarama	A. Sanjeevi	Uttam Mohanty, Anita Das		
Ramayana	Gobind Tej	Uttam Mohanty, subhra pati,		
Seeta Labkush	Jagdish Chandra	Uttam Mohanty, Aparajita Mohanty		
Tapasya	Nagen Roy	Ajit Das, Anita Das		
Trinatha Mela	Krushna Chandra Rath	Rabindra Kumar Rath, Subhra Pati		
Jhieenki Jhinka	Brundaban Jena	Ajit Das, Jaya Swami		
Kachaghara	Byomkesh Tripathi	Bijayini Misra, Surya Misra		
1981
Akshi Tritiya	Babulal Doshi	Uttam Mohanty, Mahasweta Roy		
Bilwa Mangala	J.H. Satar	Radha Panda		
Arati	J.H. Satar	Uttam Mohanty, Tandra Roy, Anita Das		
Pujarini	J. Adeni	Niharika Sahu		
Batashi Jhada	Ramesh Mohanty	Kasi Ratha, Jaya Swami		
Manasi	Malaya Mitra	Shriram Panda, Tripura Misra		
Kie Jite Kie Hare	Nitai Palit			
Devajani	Byomokesh Tripathy	Uttam Mohanty, Sharabani Ray		
Pooja	Prashanta Nanda	Prashanta Nanda, Mahasweta Roy		
Sei Sura	Niranjan Dey	mahashweta Roy		
Tike hasa Tike Luha	Sushila Mukherjee	Bijay Mohanty, Mahasweta Roy,		
Nila Saila	Akshaya Mohanty (Kashyap)	Saudamini, Radha Panda,		
Ulka	Sruya Misra	Sruya Misra, Gloria Mohanty, Mahasweta Roy		
1982
Ashanta Graha	Sarat Pujari	Hemant Das, Mahasweta Roy		
Hisab Nikas	Prashanta Nanda	Prashanta Nanda, Shriram Panda, Mahasweta Roy, Deepa Sahu		First Cinemascope film in Oriya
Astaraga	Sarat Pujari	Sarat Pujari, Aparajita Mohanty		Debut film of Aparajita mohanty
Mu tume O Se	Kumar Anand	Sriram Panda, Ajit Das, Sujata Anand		
Jwain Pua	Dinen Gupta	Sharat Pujari, Uttam Mohanty,Mithu Mukharji, Jharana Das		
Samaya Bada Balawan	Sisir Misra	Uttam Mohanty, Shriram Panda, Mahasweta Roy, Bijay Mohanty, Roja Ramani		
Seeta Rati	Man Mohan Mahapatra	Arun Nanda, Mahasweta Roy, Hemanta Das		
Baje Bainsi Nache Gunghura	Kelucharan Mohapatra	Sangeeta Das, Bibek Satpathy		
1983
Aashar Akash	Gadadhar Putti	Bijaya Jena, Ajit Das		
Jeebaku Debi Nahin	Nisith Bannerjee			
Bhakta Salabega	Radha Panda	Uttam Mohanty		
Jheeati Sita Pari	Bidhubhushan Nanda	Aparajita Mohanty,		
Dekh Khabar Rakh Najar	Kumar Anand	Surendra Khuntia, Uttam Mohanty, Sriram Panda		
Abhilasa	Sadhu Meher	Uttam Mohanty, Aparajita Mohanty, Sujata, Jaya Swami, Byomkesh Tripathi, Niranjan, Sadhu Meher	Drama	
Kalyani	Samiran Dutta	Hemant Das		
Maha Sati Savitri	Sona Mukherjee	Tapati Bhatacharya		
Ram Rahim	Sushil Mukherjee	Uttam Mohanty, aparajita Mohanty, Uttam Mohanty	Drama	
Udaya Bhanu	Surya Misra	Surya Misra, Gloria Mohanty		
Swapna Sagar	Prashanta Nanda	Prashanta Nanda, Shriram Panda, Mahasweta Roy, Anita Das		First 70mm film in Oriya
Subarna Sita	Sisir Misra	Shriram Panda		
1984
Maya Miriga	Nirad N. Mohapatra	Bansidhar Satpathy, Kishori Debi, Binod Mishra		
Basanta Rasa	Gurudas/Bansidhar Phanda			
Dheere Alua	Sagir Ahmad	Prithviraj Mishra, SoumitraDipen Ghosh		
Jeeban Sangam	Jeeban Mahanta			
Jaga Balia	Prashanta Nanda	Prashanta Nanda, Shriram Panda, Mahasweta Roy, Dolly Jena(Bijaya Jena)		
Dora	Prashanta Nanda	Prashanta Nanda, Shriram Panda, Mahasweta Roy		
Jaiphula	Sidhartha	Uttam Mohanty, Aparajita Mohanty, Jaya Swami		
Hakima Babu	Pranaba Das	Ajit Das, Bijaya Jena as Dolly Jena, Jaya Swami, Bijay Mohanty		
Janani	Mohammed Mohsin	Uttam Mohanty, Aparajita Mohanty		
Niraba Jhada	Man Mohan Mahapatra	Hemanta Das, Niranjan Patnaik, Manimala		
Ninad	J. H. Sattar			
Pratidhwani	P. C. Das			
Radha	J. H. Sattar	Surya Misra,		
Satya Harishchandra	C.S. Rao			
1985
Babula	Sadhu Meher	Sarat Pujari		
Gruhalakshmi	C.S. Rao	Sriram Panda,Maheswata Roy		
Banaphul	Ghanshyam Mahapatra			
Jaga Hatare Pagha	Mohammed Mohsin	Uttam Mohanty, Aparajita Mohanty, Bijay Mohanty		
Heera Nila	Prashant Nanda	Mahaswata, Sriram Panda, Bijaya Jena as Dolly Jena		
Klanta Aparahna	Man Mohan Mahapatra	Sachidananda Ratha, Kanaka Panigrahi, Kishori Devi		
Chaka Bhaunri	Mohammed Mohsin	Uttam Mohanty, Aparajita Mohanty		
Manini	Ravi Kinnagi	Sriram Panda, Talluri Rameshwari, Debu Bose, Jairam Samal		
Mamata Mage Mula	Amiya Patnaik	Uttam Mohanty, Aparajita Mohanty, Bijay Mohanty		
Nala Damayanti	Bibhuti Bhushan Misra			
Palatak	Prafulla Rath			
Para Jhia Ghara Bhangena	Ramesh Mohanty	Shrabani Ray		
Pooja Phula	J. H. Sattar	Uttam Mohanty, Aparajita Mohanty		
Sahari Bagha	Mahamad Mahsin	Uttam Mohanty, Aparajita Mohanty, Bijay mohanty		
Shankha Sindura	Bijay Bhaskar	Shriram Panda, Uttam Mohanty, Aparajita Mohanty		
Sanskara	Uday Shankar Das			
Sapana Banika	P. D. Shenay	Shriram Panda, Dipti Nath		
Sata Kebe Luchi Rahena	Ramesh Mohanty	Uttam Mohanty, Aparajita, Tandra Roy		
School Master	Gobind Tej	Gobind Tej, Uttam Mohanty, Aparajita Mohanty		
Sesha Pratikshya	Pranab Das			
1986
Bagula Baguli	Prashanta Nanda	Prashanta Nanda, Mahasweta Roy, Srikant		
Kuhudi	Man Mohan Mahapatra			
Manisha	Braja Das			
Manisha	Jyoti Prakash	Bijay Mohanty, Aparajita Mohanty		
Manika	R. Asrar			
Eai Aama Sansara	Sisir Misra	Bijay Mohanty,Shriram Panda, Tandra roy		
Sansara	Debi Prasad Das			
Trisandhya	Man Mohan Mahapatra			
Paka Kambal Pot Chhota	Prahsanta Nanda	Prahsanta Nanda, Uttam Mohanty, Mahasweta Roy		
Chamana Atha Guntha	Parbati Ghosh	Bijay Mohanty, Parbati Ghosh,Sarat Pujari		
1987
Phoola Chandana	Mohammed Mohsin	Uttam Mohanty, Aparajita Mohanty,Ajit Das		
Basanti Apa	S. K. Kalim			
Kasturi	J. H. Sattar			
Badhu Nirupama	Jugala Devata	Shriram Panda		
Bhuli Huena	Bijay Mohanty	Shriram Panda		
Eai Ta Duniya	Mohammed Mohsin	Uttam Mohanty, Aparajita Mohanty		
Golam Giri	Prashanta Nanda	Prashanta Nanda, Uttam Mohanty, Mahasweta Roy		
Jaydeva	Shyamal Mukherjee			
Jor Jara Mulak Tar	Raju Misra	Sriram Panda, Baisali, Uttam Mohanty, Hara Patnaik		
Majhi Pahacha	Man Mohan Mahapatra			
Sabu Mayare Baya	Sabyasachi Mohapatra	Prashanta Nanda,Pruthiraj Nayak,Baishali		
Tunda Baida	Gobind Tej	Uttam Mohanty, Aparajita Mohanty,Ajit Das		
Bhanga Silhat		Manjula Kanwar		Manjula Kanwar got best supporting actress in National film award 1987
1988
Anyaya Sahibi Nahin	Ashok Sharma	Uttam Mohanty, Shehnaz		
Bada Bhauja	Rajani Kanta	Bijay Mohanty, Uttam Mohanty, Sri Ram Panda, Kalyani Mandal, Baishali, Jayee, Debu brahma, Debu Bose, Asit Pati, Baby Artist-Soni		
Bahu Heba Emiti	Bijaya Bhaskar			
Kichi Smruti Kichi Anubhuti	Man Mohan Mahapatra			
Kurukshetra	Shriram Panda	Shriram Panda, Tripura Misra, Ashru Mochon Mohanty		
Kanyadaan	Arun Mohanty			
Lal Pana Bibi	Prashanta Nanda	Prashanta Nanda, Mahasweta Roy		
Jahaku Rakhibe Ananta	Ashim Kumar	Uttam Mohanty, Kanta Singh		
Nishitha Swapna	Man Mohan Mahapatra			
Papa Punya	Sidhartha			
Pua Moro Kala Thakura	RAju Misra	Uttam Mohanty, Aparajita Mohanty		
Suna Chadhei	Rabi Kinnagi	Uttam Mohanty, Archana Jogelkar		
Thili Jhia Heli Bahu	Bijay Bhaskar	Uttam Mohanty, Aparajita Mohanty		
1989
Bhookha	Sabyasachi Mahapatra	Sarat Pujari, Swati Roy, Sadhu Meher	Drama based on Sambalpuri novel by Manglu Charan Biswal	First Sambalpuri language movie, Special Jury Award Best feature Film At 28th Gijjon International film Festival Spain
Akashra Aakhi	Pankaj Pani	Sriram Panda, Mihir Das, Ajaya Das,Jayee,		
Jaa Devi Sarbabhuteshu	Prashanta Nanda	Prashanta Nanda, Mahasweta Roy, Srikant, Charanraj		
Andha Diganta	Manmohan Mahapatra	Arun Nanda, Jaya Swami, Manimala Devi		
Naya Chakra	Prashanta Nanda	Prashanta Nanda,		
Asuchi Mo Kalia Suna	Raju Misra	Shriram Panda		
Bidhira Bidhan	Mahamad Mohsin	Uttam Mohanty, Aparajita Mohanty, Bijay Mohanty		
Chaka Akhi Sabu Dekhuchi	Raju Misra	Uttam Mohanty, ShreePrada		
Mamata Ra Dori	Mahamad Mahsin	Uttam Mohanty, Aparajita Mohanty, Bijay Mohanty		
Micha Maya Ra Sansar	Uday Shankar Pani	Shriram Panda, Tandra Roy		
Panchu Pandav	Sisir Mohan Pati	Prashanta Nanda, Shriram Panda, Uttam Mohanty, Mahasweta Roy, Shrikant		
Pratisodha Aparadh Nuhen	Binoda Nanda			
Rajanigandha	Bijay Misra	Uttam Mohanty		
Sagar	Raju Misra			
Sasti	Brundaban Jena	Bijaya Jena		
Tathapi	Man Mohan Mahapatra			
Raja Rani				
Topaye sindura Dipata Shankha	J. H. Sattar	Tapas Paul		
