= List of Odia films of 1985 =

This is a list of films produced by the Ollywood film industry based in Bhubaneshwar and Cuttack in 1985:

== A-Z ==
Title	Director	Cast	Genre	Notes
1985
Babula	Sadhu Meher	Sarat Pujari		
Banaphul	Ghanshyam Mahapatra			
Chaka Bhaunri	Mohammed Mohsin	Uttam Mohanty, Aparajita Mohanty		
Gruhalakshmi	C.S. Rao	Sriram Panda, Maheswata Roy		
Hakim Babu	Pranaba Das	Ajit Das, Dolly Jena, Jaya Swami, Bijay Mohanty		
Heera Nila		Bijaya Jena		
Jaga Hatare Pagha	Mohammed Mohsin	Uttam Mohanty, Aparajita Mohanty, Bijay Mohanty		
Klanta Aparahna	Man Mohan Mahapatra	Sachidananda Ratha, Kanaka Panigrahi, Kishori Devi		
Manini	Ravi Kinnagi	Sriram Panda, Talluri Rameshwari, Debu Bose, Jairam Samal		
Mamata Mage Mula	Amiya Patnaik	Uttam Mohanty, Aparajita Mohanty, Bijay Mohanty		
Nala Damayanti	Bibhuti Bhushan Misra			
Palatak	Prafulla Rath			
Para Jhia Ghara Bhangena	Ramesh Mohanty	Shrabani Ray		
Pooja Phula	J. H.Sattar	Uttam Mohanty, Aparajita Mohanty		
Sahari Bagha	Mahamad Mahsin	Uttam Mohanty, Aparajita Mohanty,Bijay mohanty		
Sanskara	Uday Shankar Das			
Sapana Banika	P.D. Shenay	Shriram Panda, Dipti Nath		
Sata Kebe Luchi Rahena	Ramesh Mohanty	Uttam Mohanty, Aparajita, Tandra Roy		
School Master	Gobind Tej	Gobind Tej, Uttam Mohanty, Aparajita Mohanty		
Sesha Pratikshya	Pranab Das	Gloria Mahanty, Aparajita Mohanty, Radha Panda		
Shankha Sindura	Bijay Bhaskar	Shriram Panda, Uttam Mohanty, Aparajita Mohanty		
