= Lochani Bag =

Indian actress

- Born: Kalahandi, Odisha, India
- Occupation: Actor
- Years active: 2014–present
- Known for: Odia Cinema
- Notable work: Tulasi Apa, Pahada Ra Luha

Lochani Bag is an Indian actor who works mainly in the Odia film industry, "Ollywood". She has acted in films such as Aadim Vichar, Pahada Ra Luha, Sala Budha and Odisha's first biopic film Tulasi Apa.

== Career ==
Lochani got the opportunity to work with award-winning film maker Sabyasachi Mohapatra in Aadim Vichar, which was her first film. The film won national award and state awards including her first award as best supporting actress. Lochani has acted in Pahadara Luha directed by Sabyasachi Mohapatra and Tulasi Apa directed by Amiya Pattnaik in 2015. Both films were screened at the International Film Festival of India (IFFI) in the Indian Panorama section. Tulasi Apa was also screened at the 21st Kolkata International Film Festival, the 8th Bengaluru International Film Festival, the International Film Festival of Shimla (IFFS, the 8th Nasik International Film Festival in India and at the Tehran Jasmine International Film Festival in Ramsar, Iran. Tulasi Apa received positive reviews from the critics when it was screened at the 21st Kolkata International Film Festival and the 8th Bengaluru International Film Festival. Both of her films were highly successful as Pahada Ra Luha got a national award and Tulasi Apa won various state awards.

== Filmography ==
Year	Film	Role	Director	Language	Ref
2014	Aadim Vichar	Eldest daughter-in-law	Sabyasachi Mohapatra	Odia	
2015	Pahada Ra Luha	Female Paraja Leader	Sabyasachi Mohapatra	Odia	
2017	Tulasi Apa	Ghasa Munda	Amiya Patnaik	Odia	
2020	Sala Budha Ra Badla		Sabyasachi Mohapatra	Odia	

== Awards ==
Year	Award	Film	Category	Result	Ref
2015	26th Odisha State Film Award	Aadim Vichar	Best Supporting Actress	Won	
2019	6th Odia Tele Award	Ragada	Special Jury Award	Won	
