= Cinema of Odisha =

Odia cinema
- No. of screens: Approximately 65 in Odisha state of India
- Main distributors: Tarang Cine Productions; Odiaone Entertainment

Odia cinema, also known as Ollywood, is the segment of Indian cinema, dedicated to the production of motion pictures in the Odia language widely spoken in the state of Odisha. Odia Cinema is based in Cuttack in Odisha, India. The name Ollywood is a portmanteau of the words Odia and Hollywood.

== Industry ==
In 1974, the Government of Odisha declared film making and construction of cinema theatres as an industry in the state, and in 1976 it established the Odisha Film Development Corporation in Cuttack.

== History ==
=== Early history (late 1930s–1970s) ===
Odisha has a history of filmmaking, starting from 1936. The first Odia film is Sita Bibaha, made by Mohan Sundar Deb Goswami in 1936. Drawn from the Indian epic Ramayana, the story is about the marriage of Sita and Ram. The film plot was made from a drama written by Kamapala Mishra. Prepared with a budget of only Rs 30,000, the film has 14 song sequences. Despite it being the first Odia film with several drawbacks in every section of its making, the two-hour-long movie generated great enthusiasm among the people. It was released in Lakhmi Talkies, Puri. The 12-reeled film had in its cast Makhanlal Banerjee (Ram), who received only Rs 120 for his performance, Aditya Ballabha Mohanty (Lakhmana), who got only Rs 35 as conveyance allowance, and Prabati Debi (Sita), who was paid the highest amount of Rs 150. This was a landmark film of the Odia film Industry.

The pace of Odia film production in the initial years was very slow. After Sita Bibaha, only two films were produced until 1951. A joint consortium of landlords and businessmen who collected funds after 1948 produced those two movies. The 1951 production Roles – 28 was the first Odia film with an English name. It was released 15 years after Sita Bibaha. It was the fourth Odia film produced by Ratikant Padhi.

The eleventh Odia film ever produced was Sri Lokanath, being released in 1960 and being directed by directed by Prafulla Sengupta. andwas the first Odia film to receive a National Award.received the National Award in 1960.

The same year, Prasanta Nanda won the National Film Award for Best Feature Film in Odia for his debut film, Nua Bou. He was present in Odia films since 1959, but he became very active only after 1976. Nanda was an actor, director, screenplay writer, lyricist and playback singer. Nanda won National Awards three times, in 1960, 1966 and 1969 for his acting in Nua Bou, Matira Manisha and Adina Megha.

=== Golden age (1980s–2000s) ===
Mohammad Mohsin started the revolution in the Odia film industry by not only securing the essence of the Odia culture but also changing the way the film industry watched Odia movies. Phoola Chandana was written by Ananda Sankar Das. His movies heralded the golden era of the Odia film industry by bringing in freshness to Odia movies. His directorial debut was Phoola Chandana for which he won the Odisha State Film Award for Best Director.

Amiya Ranjan Patnaik, who started his career directing Mamata Mage Mula, changed the dimension of the Odia film industry by producing big budget movies with multiple star casts, which was a new trend at that time. He introduced many newcomers, musicians, technicians and singers from Mumbai and Chennai. He also produced the National Award-winning film Hakim Babu in 1985, directed by Pranab Das. His film Pua Mora Kala Thakura, directed by Raju Mishra, was one of the biggest successes in the Odia film industry, followed by Chaka Aakhi Sabu Dekhuchi and Asuchi Mo Kalia Suna. He frequently collaborated with Raju Mishra, Akshaya Mohanty, Bijay Mohanty and Uttam Mohanty. Raja Rani, Paradeshi Babu and Parimahal were made in languages such as Odia and Bengali. He made a comeback as a director and made Tulasi Apa produced by his son Anupam Patnaik. This was an Odia biopic based on Padmashree Tulasi Munda, a social activist from the Indian state of Odisha accredited for her contribution to spreading literacy among the impoverished adivasi peoples of Odisha.

Himansu Sekhar Khatua, an Indian director, educationalist, and journalist who directed the national film award winning movies Sunya Swaroop and Kathantara in 1996 and 2005 respectively. Mr Khatua is the National Film Award recipient for Best Film direction in 2005 and National Award recipient for best debut film Sunya Swaroop in the 44th National Film Festival. Besides he has also directed many award winning movies such as Matira Bandhana, Krantidhara and the Sea and Seven Villages.

Uttam Mohanty, whose debut film Abhiman won accolades, was very successful in the 1980s. His wife Aparajita Mohanty is also an actress. Critics have named Bijay Mohanty and Mihir Das to be two of the best Odia actors so far 80'and 90's. In 1990s, Siddhanta Mahapatra, a new generation star, with his action and comedy movies gave national recognition to Odia industry. Actress Nandita Das, who acted in several Hindi movies like Fire, has an Odia origin. She acted in the Susanta Misra-directed Biswaprakash, which won a National Award in 2000. Barsha Priyadarshini is also another successful actress in the millennium era of Odia cinema.

Mrinal Sen directed an Odia film, Matira Manisha, which won a National Film Award for Best Feature Film in Odia to Prashanta Nanda.

=== Rise to national fame (2022 onwards) ===
In 2022, the film Pratikshya (2022) earned critical acclaim for its potrayal of "sorrow, happiness as well as failure and success of an Odia middle class family", as reported by a critic from Kalinga TV. In the same year, Babushaan Mohanty's movie Daman created history with a box office collection of ₹7.5 crores, the highest collection figure in Ollywood for its time.

== Notable people ==
=== Actors ===
- Ajit Das
- Akash Das Nayak
- Amlan Das
- Anubhav Mohanty
- Arindam Roy
- Atal Bihari Panda
- Babushaan Mohanty
- Bijay Mohanty
- Buddhaditya Mohanty
- Chandan Kar
- Chandrachur Singh
- Chittaranjan Tripathy
- Dipanwit Dashmohapatra
- Dukhiram Swain
- Hara Patnaik
- Harihara Mahapatra
- Jayiram Samal
- Jyoti Ranjan Nayak
- Kuna Tripathy
- Mihir Das
- Minaketan Das
- Mohammad Mohsin
- Munna Khan
- Papu Pam Pam
- Partha Sarathi Ray
- Pintu Nanda
- Prashant Nanda
- Prashanta Nanda
- Rabi Mishra
- Sabyasachi Mishra
- Sadhu Meher
- Samaresh Routray
- Sarat Pujari
- Siddhanta Mahapatra
- Sisir Misra
- Sriram Panda
- Sritam Das
- Uttam Mohanty

=== Actresses ===
- Sulagna Panigrahi
- Naina Das
- Anita Das
- Anu Chowdhury
- Aparajita Mohanty
- Archana Joglekar
- Archita Sahu
- Aruna Irani
- Barsha Priyadarshini
- Barsha Patnaik
- Bijaya Jena
- Bhanumati Devi
- Bhoomika Dash
- Elina Samantray
- Gloria Mohanty
- Jharana Das
- Jyoti Mishra
- Kavya Keeran
- Mahasweta Ray
- Manimala
- Minati Mishra
- Naina Das
- Namrata Das
- Nandita Das
- Parbati Ghose
- Prakruti Mishra
- Pupul Bhuyan
- Rajeswari Ray
- Riya Dey
- Sudharani Jena
- Tandra Ray
- Tamanna Vyas

=== Directors ===
- Himansu Sekhar Khatua
- Manmohan Mahapatra
- Apurba Kishore Bir
- Ashok Pati
- Bijaya Jena
- Biswanath Rath
- Chittaranjan Tripathy
- Hara Patnaik
- Mohammad Mohsin
- Nila Madhab Panda
- Nirad N. Mohapatra
- Nitai Palit
- Mehmood Hussain
- Pranab Kumar Aich
- Prashant Nanda
- Prabhat Mukherjee
- Ravi Kinagi
- Sabyasachi Mohapatra

SK Muralidharan

- Sudhakar Basant
- Sadhu Meher
- Sanjay Nayak
- Sarat Pujari
- Sisir Mishra
- Tapas Sargharia
- Susant Mani
- Raju Mishra
- Vishal Mourya

=== Music directors ===
- Akshaya Mohanty
- Prafulla Kar
- Bhubaneswar Mishra
- Bappi Lahiri
- Balakrushna Das
- Shantanu Mahapatra
- Upendra Kumar
- Amarendra Mohanty
- Raju Mishra
- Sarat Nayak
- Prem Anand
- Abhijit Majumdar

=== Screenwriters ===
- Subodh Patnaik

=== Male playback singers ===
- Akshaya Mohanty
- Babul Supriyo
- Babushaan Mohanty
- Balakrushna Dash
- Bhikari Bal
- Biswajit Mohapatra
- Humane Sagar
- Krishna Beura
- Mohammed Aziz
- Prafulla Kar
- Raghunath Panigrahi
- Rituraj Mohanty
- Sarbeswar Bhoi
- Sikandar Alam
- Suresh Wadkar
- K. J. Yesudas
- Udit Narayan

=== Female playback singers ===
- Ananya Nanda
- Anuradha Paudwal
- Aarti Mukherjee
- Bhubaneswari Mishra
- Chandrani Mukherjee
- Diptirekha Padhi
- Haimanti Sukla
- Lata Mangeshkar
- Nirmala Mishra
- P. Susheela
- S. Janaki
- Sandhya Mukherjee
- Shyamamani Pattnaik
- Sohini Mishra
- Suman Kalyanpur
- Tapu Mishra
- Usha Mangeskar
- Usha Uthup
- Vani Jairam

=== Art directors ===
- Asim Basu
- Nikhil Baran Sengupta

== Awards list ==
- Odisha State Film Awards
- National Film Award for Best Feature Film in Odia
- National Film Award for Best Supporting Actress (1987) – Manjula Kanwar for Bhanga Silata
- National Film Award for Best Child Artist (1994) – Tarasankar Misra for Lavanya Preethi
- Filmfare Awards East

== See also ==
- List of Oriya films

== General sources ==
- Ghosh, Kartick Kumar (1984). Oriya Chalachitrara Itihas. Odisha Book Store. Contains information on films from 1934 to 1984.
