= Barsha Patnaik =

Indian actress

- Born: Barsha Nayak; Paradip, Odisha, India
- Education: MBA
- Alma mater: Biju Patnaik University of Technology
- Occupations: Film actor, IT Professional
- Years active: 2015-present
- Known for: Odia Cinema
- Notable work: Tulasi Apa
- Spouse: Anupam Patnaik
- Awards: Odisha State Film Awards

Barsha Patnaik (née Nayak) is an Indian actress, born in Paradip, Odisha. She works in Odia cinema industry. Her debut film was Tulasi Apa. Debut film earned her success as she was awarded Best actress in 27th Odisha State Film Awards presented by the Government of Odisha.

== Career ==
Barsha got her first film 'Tulasi Apa' directed by Amiya Patnaik after giving audition, while she was working for an IT Company in Hyderabad in 2015. The film is based on the life of social activist and Padma Shri awardee Tulasi Munda.'Tulasi Apa' was screened in International Film Festival of India (IFFI), 21st Kolkata International Film Festival, 8th Bengaluru International Film Festival, International Film Festival of Shimla (IFFS) and 8th Nasik International Film Festival in India and outside of India at Tehran Jasmine International Film Festival in Ramsar, Iran. But the film was released in theatres on 19 May 2017. This film has become the first Odia feature film to be featured on Amazon Prime World Wide.

== Filmography ==
Year	Film	Role	Ref
2017	Tulasi Apa	Tulasi Munda	
2022	Pratikshya	Kalyani	

== Accolades ==
Year	Award	Film	Category	Result	Ref
2015	27th Odisha State Film Award	Tulasi Apa	Best Actress	Won	
2016	1st Haryana International Film Festival	Tulasi Apa	Best Actress	Won	
