= Gourahari Das =

Indian author (born 1960)

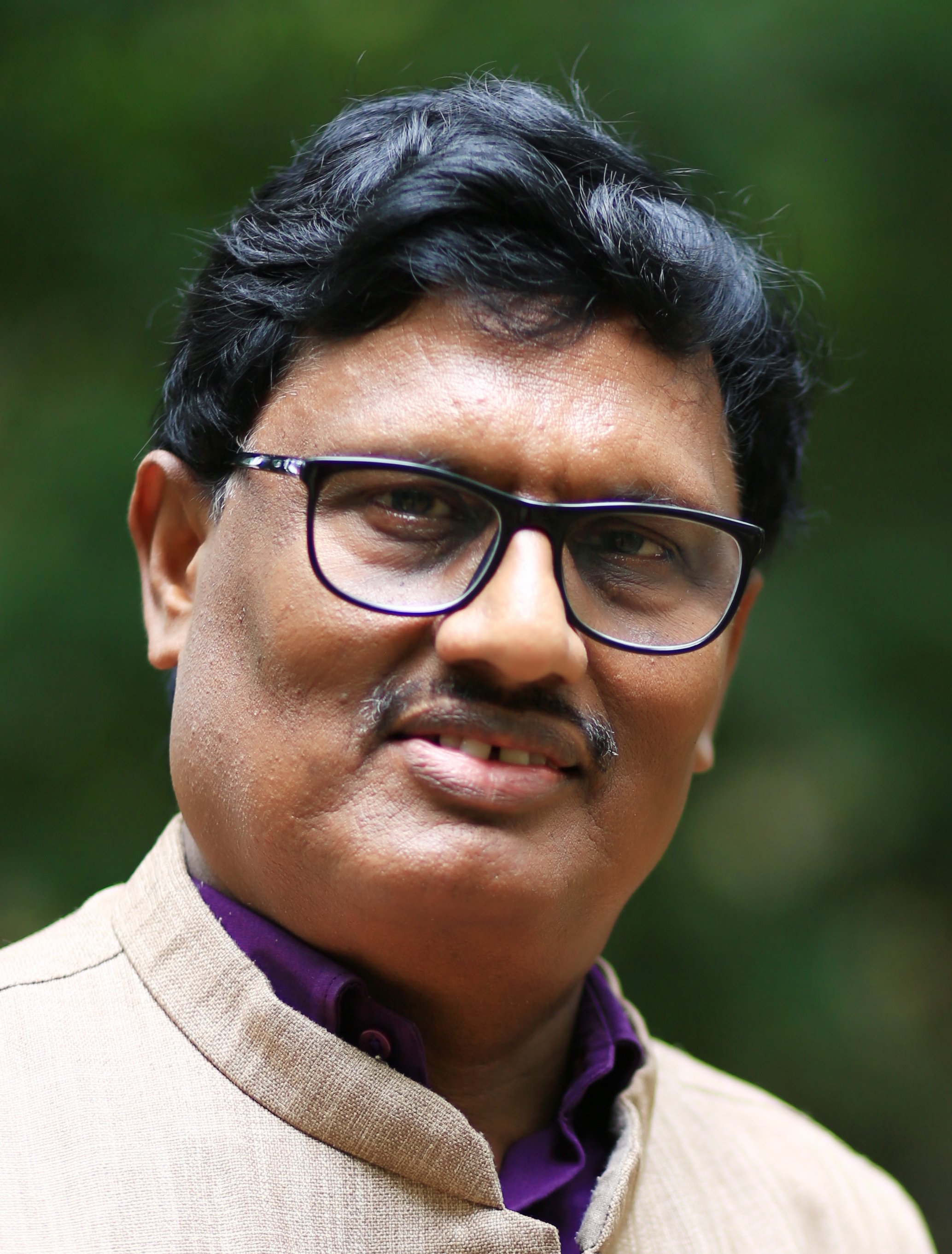
- Gourahari Das in 2022
- Born: 9 October 1960 (age 65); Sandhagada, Bhadrak district, Odisha, India
- Occupations: Novelist, short story writer, screenwriter, dramatist, columnist
- Writing career
- Pen name: Sri Narada
- Genres: Crime, drama, history, travel, poetry
- Notable works: Chayasoudho Ro Absesha, Nijo Sange Nijoro Lodhei
- Das' voice Recorded January 2014
- Website: gouraharidas.com

Gourahari Das (born 9 October 1960) is an Indian creative writer, journalist and academician.

== Life ==
Born in 1960, in a back of the beyond village in the district of Bhadrak (formerly a part of Balasore) of state Odisha in India, Das grew up with keen eyes of observation and sensibility which shaped his creative being.

He had a very difficult childhood and had to struggle hard to get education. He had to leave his home at the age of eight and live in a monastery. A scholarship helped him to further his school education. After his school education, he came to Cuttack and took up variety of works to support his studies. He worked during dayhours and studied in evening colleges. He completed BA from Ravenshaw Evening College Cuttack. Subsequently, he did his master's degree in Odia language and literature from Utkal University. Later he studied MJMC and was awarded a gold medal. He holds a Ph.D. from Utkal University too.

A recipient of Sahitya Akademi Award, India, Das is a creative writer, editor and columnist. His first book “ Juara Bhatta” which is a collection of short stories, was published in 1981 when he was still pursuing his studies in Ravenshaw Evening College. Besides writing fictions he also writes regular columns in newspaper SAMBAD which are very popular. He is also the recipient of prestigious Koraput Literary Award 2019, from Odia Media Private Limited, the organiser of Koraput Literary Festival.

== Career ==
He joined in SAMBAD (the largest Daily of Odisha) in 1985 as a trainee sub-editor and rose up to become an editor of this Media House. His long association with Sambad Group gave him an opportunity to explore his multi-faceted talent. He started writing his popular columns “Jibanara Jalachhabi” ( Vignetts of Life) and “ Rajadhani Rajaniti” ( Power Politics of the Capital) in this newspaper which brought him prominence. While the first one is a creative commentary on human life the later is a political satire. Later he became the editor of KATHA (the fiction monthly of Sambad Group). He is also the principal of Sambad School of Media and Culture, a pioneer media institute affiliated to Utkal University of Culture since 2007.

== Creative journey ==
Gourahari started writing short stories from very early age. In fact his first short story "Kshinaloka" was published in the magazine 'Kalyani' when he was only 15 years old. Soon he took up writing seriously and to date he has more than 51 books to his credit. These include novels, short stories, essays, plays, poems, translations and vignettes. He has also written travelogues on US, Sweden and China.

As a journalist he has devoted much of his energy in eradicating superstition such as witchcraft and animal sacrifice. His comments on certain practices at Sri Jagannath temple at Puri and other places of worship have put him in the bracket of journalists with conviction. His column "Odisha Diary" which appears in special occasions is a popular one in Odisha.

== Other activities ==
He is associated with Sahitya Akademi (India's highest body of letters) since 2008- first as a member of Odia advisory board and then a member of executive board and general council.

He is associated with a number of socio-cultural organizations of Odisha which work for betterment of human life and building better society. He is the president of Shatabdira Kalajkar, a leading theatre group of Odisha and advisor of Trishakti Mahila Samiti, a prominent women's organization. Besides he is a member of Utkal Sahitya Samaj, the oldest cultural body of Odisha. He was a member of Regional Film Censor Board from 2012 to 2015.

== Travel ==
He has traveled different countries and participated in cultural exchange programmes. He visited the United States in 1996 and again in 2000 to deliver speeches at Annual Conference of OSA. (Odisha Society of Americas) in Washington, D.C., and Nashvalley. He had been to China in 2002 as a Member of Indian Writers Delegation and participated in Frankfurt Book Fair, Germany in 2014. He has visited Sweden, the United Kingdom, the Netherlands, France, the Czech Republic, Slovakia, Switzerland, Italy, Belgium and Austria.

== Selected works ==
=== Novels ===
- Chhayasoudhara Abasesha 1996
- Nija Sange Nijara Ladhei1999
- Eithu Arambha 2005
- Apananka Angyadhina 2010
- Kete Rangara Jibana 2013

=== Short story collections ===
- Akhada Ghara
- Swapna Pain Rati Kahin
- Bharatabarsha
- Maati Kandhei
- Maaya
- Sesha Baji
- Punarabrutti
- Ghara
- Kagajadanga
- Ahalyara Bahaghara
- Mathurara Manachitra
- Kanta O Anyanya Galpa
- Analeuta O Anyanya Galpa

=== Vignettes ===
- Jibanara Jalachhabi
- Chinha Chouhadi
- Bhinna Bhumika
- Parichita Paridhi
- Asamartha Ishwara
- Hatalekha Chithi

=== Plays ===
- Aparadha
- Asami (in press)
- Maya

=== Poems ===
- Paunshara Pandulipi

=== Essays ===
- Odisha Diary
- Kahara Odisha
- Kathabarta
- Katha Sarinahin

=== Editing ===
- Piladina
- Prema
- Suryastara Ranga
- Karmayogi Phakiracharan
- Bhala Galpa: Bhumi O Bhumika
- Swadhinottara Odia Kshudragalpa
- Odia Galpa: Kali, Aji O Kali

=== Travelogues ===
- Pratham Prabash
- Dui Diganta
- Chinha Achinha Chin

=== Translation ===
- Yashpalnka Kahanimala
- Mitro Marjani
- Bhagaban Rajanish
- Sehisabu Piladina
- Gotie Jiban Jathesta Nuhen
- Chheli Charaibar Dina

=== Books in Hindi ===
- Door Akash Ka Pancchi
- Mathuraka Manachitra
- Kanhu Ka Ghar ( In Press)

=== Books in English ===
- The Little Monk and Other stories
- Koraput and Other Stories (in press)

== Adaptations ==
Many of his stories has been adapted as TV films directed by Nirad Mahapatra, Basant Sahu, Dhira Mallik, Nandalal Mahapatra and telecast on DD, ETV and other TV channels. His stories such as "Asami", "Maya", "Shikuli" have been made into stage plays and directed by Dhira Mallik, Pabitra Mohanty, Darpa Sethi and Ajit Dash.

Inspired from his short story, Bapa a movie Pratikshya has been made.

== Awards ==
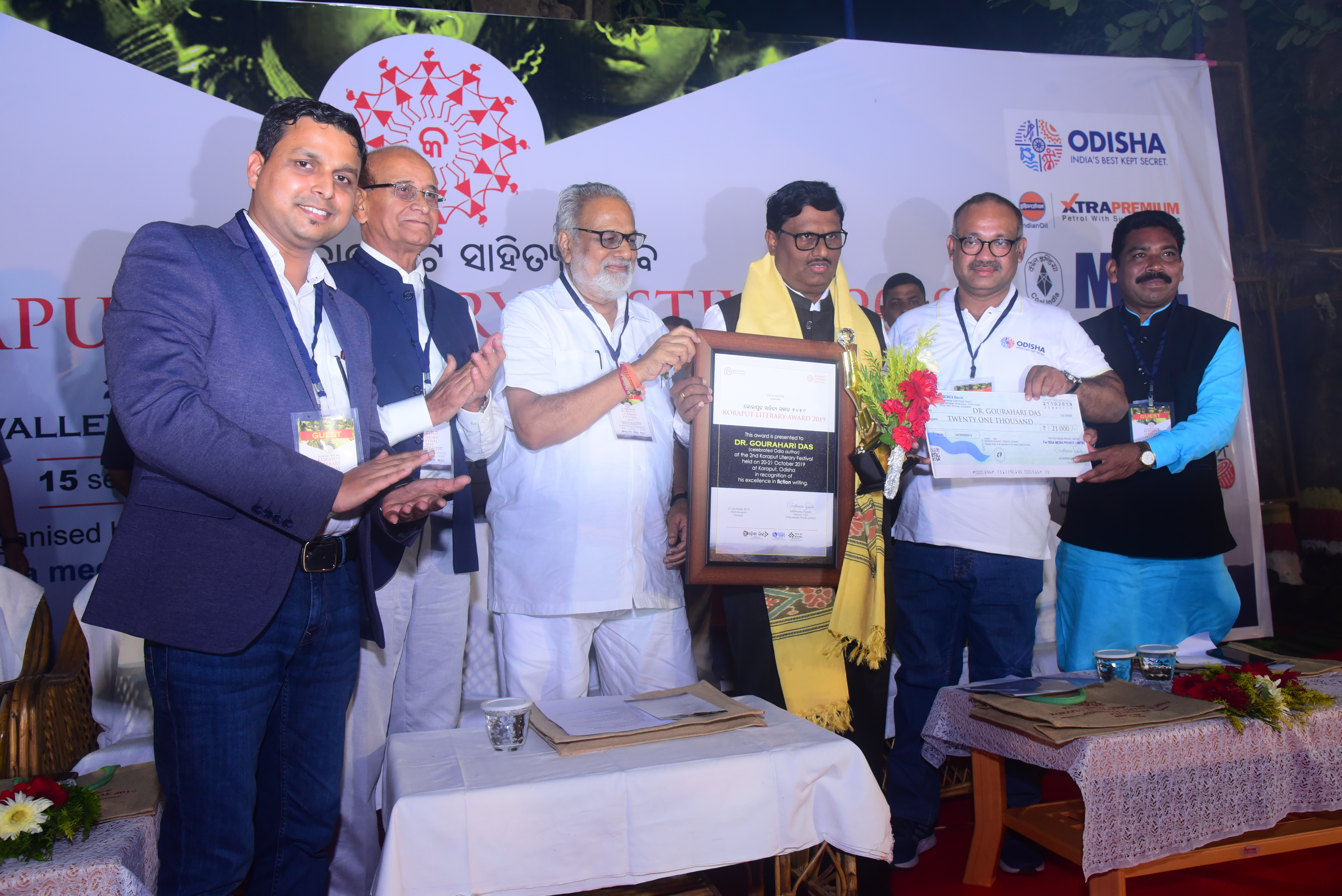
Gourahari Das receiving Koraput Literary Award 2019 for fiction during the closing ceremony of second Koraput Literary Festival at Koraput on October 21, 2020

- Sahitya Akademi, India-2012
- Odisha Sahitya Akademi -2001
- Koraput Sahitya Samman -2019

(during the annual Koraput Literary Festival organised by Odia Media Private Limited)

- Odisha Living Legend Award-2014
- Sangeet Natak Akademi Recognition-2001
- Utkal Sahitya Samaj Samman,
- Sambalpur University Award
- Sahitya Bharati Young Writer Award
- Fakirmohan Sahitya Parishad Samman
- Bhubaneswar Book Fair Award
- Katha Gourav Award
- Kanika Gourav Award and many more
- Sahitya Akademi Translation Prize for his translation Chheli Charaibar Dina.
- Sarala Award 2022 for short story collection 'Bagha O Anyanya Galpa'.

== Fellowship ==
- Senior Fellowship of Ministry of Culture, India-2011
- Writer in Residency, Sahitya Akademi, New Delhi-2010
- Junior Fellowship of Ministry of Culture, India

== Other associations ==
- Member of executive committee of Sahitya Akademi, New Delhi 2013–2017
- Member of Odia advisory board of Sahitya Akademi, 2008–2017
- Member of Regional Film Censor Board 2012–2016
- President, Satabdira Kalakar, (premier theatre group of Odisha) since 2014
- Director, News of KANAK TV 2009-2011
- Principal, Sambad School of Media and Culture since 2007

== Comments on his stories ==
Short stories of Gourahari show deep insight into human nature and the resilience of the human spirit. –Ruskin Bond

Gourahari Das sensitively chronicles the lives of the characters, and deftly probes their motives as they face life's exigencies, deal with moral dilemmas, experience crises of survival, or simply try to cope with the complicated business of living. – Jatin Nayak
