= Sambalpuri cinema =

Sambalpuri-language film industry

Sambalpuri Kosli Cinema

Gross box office
- National films: India: ₹10 crore (US$1.0 million)

The first Sambalpuri movie released was Bhukha. It was released in the year 1989 and was directed by Sabyasachi Mohapatra. It was also the first film from Western Odisha to get an International Jury Award at the Gijón International Film Festival. The second film in Sambalpuri language is Ulugulan (Revolution), which was released in 2008, directed by Mahmood Hussain and produced by Purnabasi Sahu. Its story is set in the first half of the 18th century and depicts the tyrannical rule of the Nagpur rulers.

In 2013 a Sambalpuri Kosli film was released called Alar:- The Orphan, which also became the first-ever commercial cinema (Previous two were Art/Parallel Cinema) of Saliwood. Story/Screenplay/Produced by: Manabhanjan Nayak and Directed by: Litu Mohanty.

== Films ==
| Year | Film | Director | Producer | Notes |
|---|---|---|---|---|
| 1989 | Bhukha | Sabyasachi Mohapatra | Kumar Productions | This is the first film of Odisha to get an International Jury Award at the Gijón International Film Festival, Spain |
| 2008 | Ulugulan | Mahmood Hussain | Maa Mangala Movies | Second Sambalpuri language film in two decades |
| 2011 | Samiya'r Khel | | | |
| 2013 | Alar:The Orphan | Litu Mohanty | Manabhanjan Nayak | 1st Ever Sambalpuri Commercial Cinema |
| 2013 | Sala Budha | Sabyasachi Mohapatra | Chintu B. Mohapatra | The film had won awards in seven categories at Odisha State Film Awards including best film and best director |
| 2014 | Aadim Vichar | Sabyasachi Mohapatra | Sushant Kumar Mohapatra; Chintu B. Mohapatra | won 62nd National Film Awards in 2015. |
| 2015 | Saha Mate Maa Samalei | Panini Prajna | | |
| 2016 | Chini: A Sweet Eternal | | | |
| 2016 | Mue Dewana Tue Dewani | Manabhanjan Nayak | | Executive Producer & Music Director:- Naba Mahattam |

2023 Sept 30 - Nirlaj (ନିର୍ଲଜ) Production House - JoJo J5 Productions House

Movie Link
