= Atal Bihari Panda =

Indian actor (died 2021)

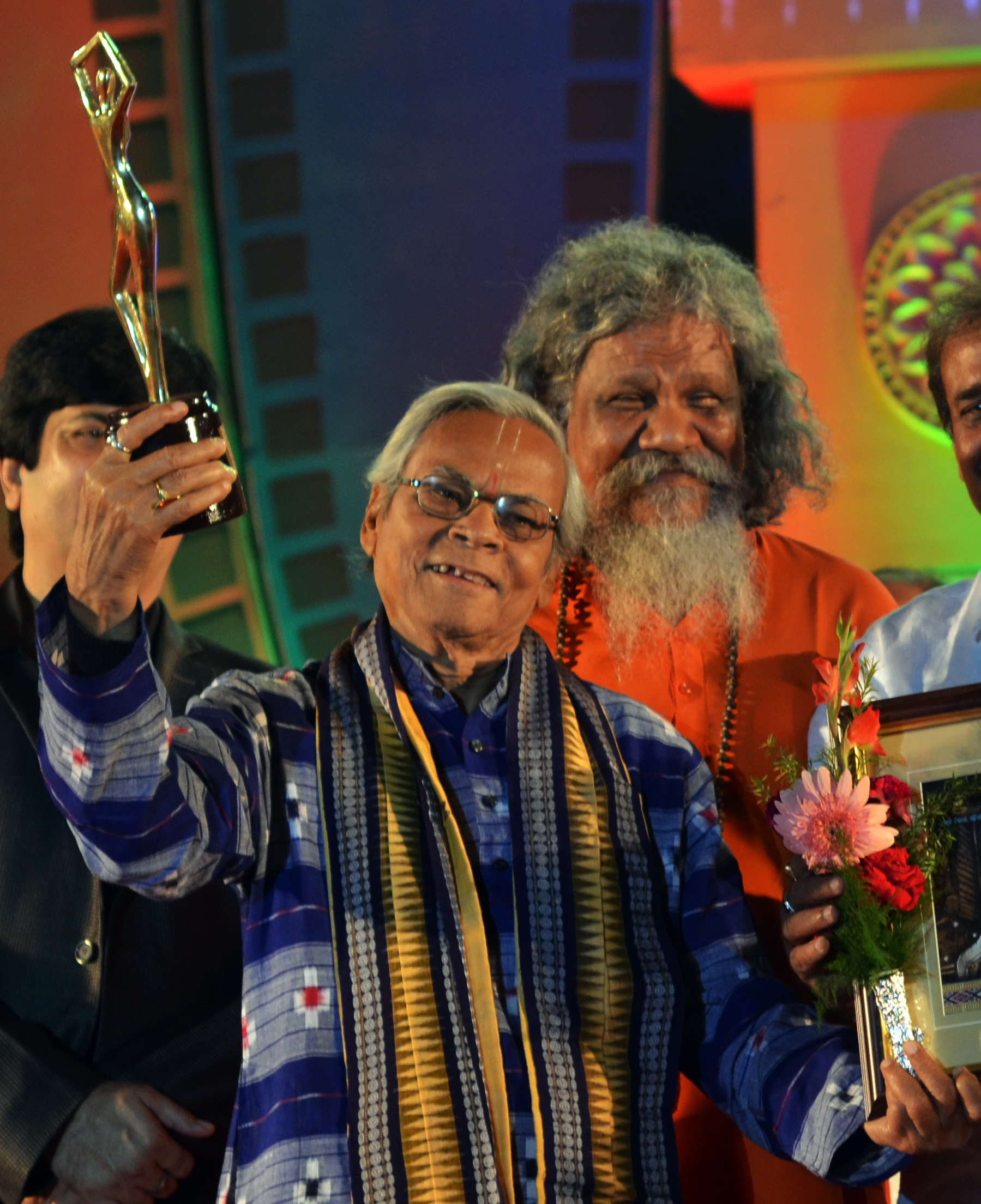
- Panda receiving 26th Odisha State Film Award for Best Actor in 2014
- Born: 1928 or 1929; Binika, Subarnapur District
- Died: 5 June 2021
- Occupations: Actor, playwright
- Years active: 1944–2012 as stage artist 2013–2020 as film actor
- Known for: Film actor and plays
- Notable work: Sala Budha, Aadim Vichar

Atal Bihari Panda (1928/9 – 5 June 2021) was an Indian actor, playwright and lyricist, known for his works in Sambalpuri odia Cinema. He was the recipient of numerous awards, including two back-to-back Odisha State Film Awards for best actor. His debut in films came at an age of 83 years. Before his debut as an actor in films, he had already written 60 plays. He also wrote lyrics in many Sambalpuri songs.

== Early works ==
He acted in over 100 plays apart from writing over 65 dramas in the Sambalpuri language. He also worked as a playwright in six operas. Initially director Sabyasachi Mohapatra approached him to write dialogue for the film Sala Budha. The director was looking for the protagonist for that film but he could not find one so he approached Atal to play the lead role and Panda agreed.

== Career ==
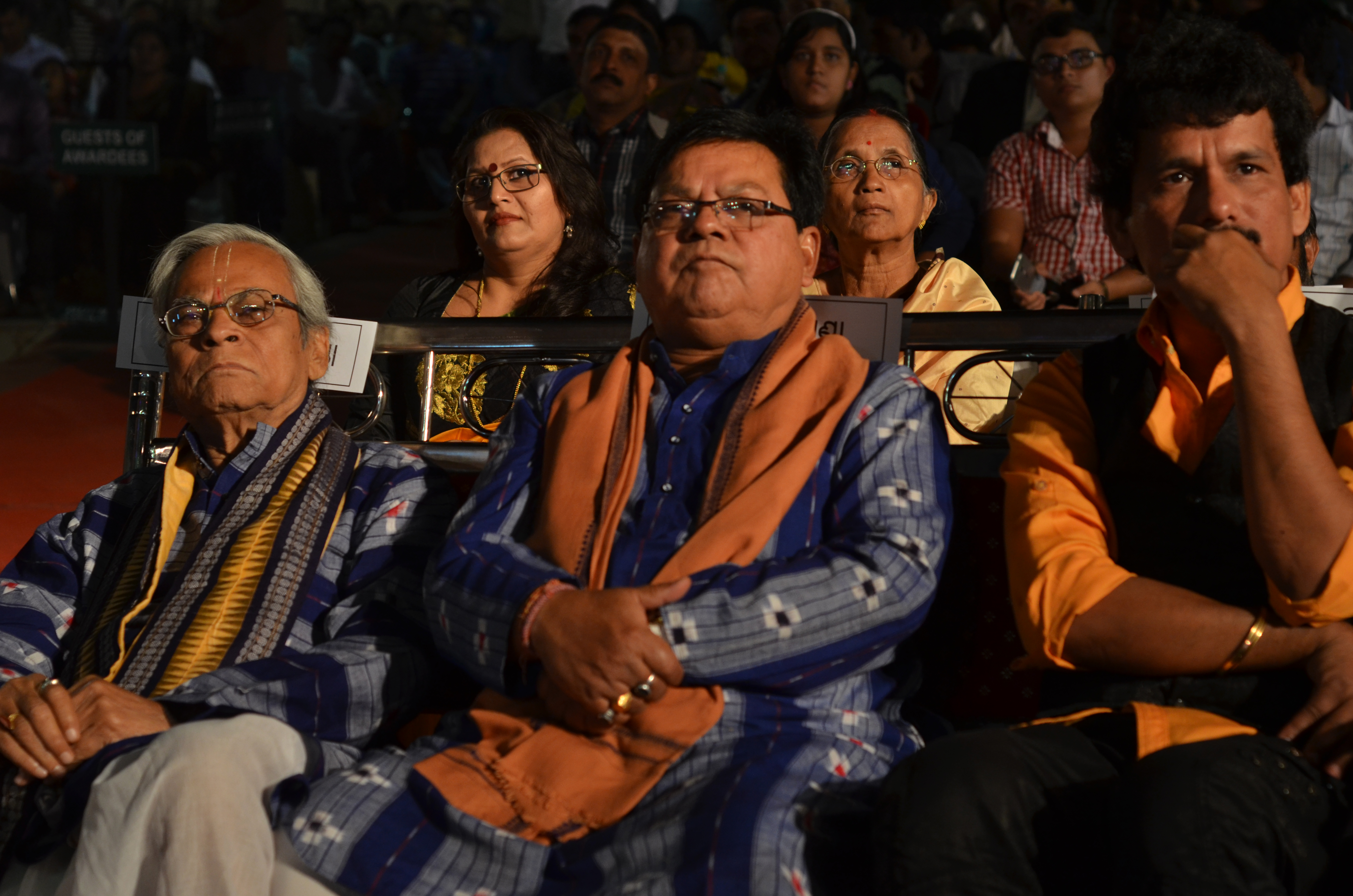
Atal Bihari Panda, Author Iti Samanta, Actor Papu Pom Pom (From left to right) during State Film Awards 2014.

He made his debut in film 'Sala Budha' in lead role and the film was directed by Sabyasachi Mohapatra in 2013. He won the Best actor award for the film Sala Budha at Odisha State Film awards. In 2014, he again got the chance to work with the director Sabyasachi Mohapatra in the film "Aadim Vichar", which was a sequel to "Sala Budha". He appeared again in the lead role in the third installment of Sala Budha film series titled "Sala Budhar Badla" released on 17 January 2020.

== Filmography ==
Year	Film	Role	Notes	ref
2013	Sala Budha	Gauntia Budha	25th Odisha State Film Award for Best Actor	
2014	Aadim Vichar	Kandha Budha	26th Odisha State Film Award for Best Actor	
2020	Sala Budhar Badla	Gauntia Budha		

== Awards ==
Year	Award	Film	Category	Result	Ref
2013	25th Odisha State Film Award	Sala Budha	Best Actor	Won	
2014	26th Odisha State Film Award	Aadim Vichar	Best Actor; Best dialogue writer	Won	

== Death ==
On 5 June 2021, Atal Bihari Panda died from COVID-19 at Veer Surendra Sai Institute of Medical Sciences and Research. He was 92 years old.
