= Rolls – 28 =

Rolls - 28
- Directed by: Kalyan Gupta
- Written by: Kalicharan Pattanayak; Brundaban Mohapatra; Kalyan Gupta
- Produced by: Ratikanta Padhi
- Music by: Goura Goswami; Nrupendra Pal
- Release date: 1951
- Country: India
- Language: Odia

Rolls – 28 (1951) is an Ollywood / Oriya film directed by Kalyan Gupta

== Cast ==
- Bimala Devi
- Kishori Devi
- Giridhari
- Ratikanta Padhi
- Pankaj
- Anima Pedini
- Rajendra
