= Odisha Living Legend Award =

- Odisha Living Legend Awards
- Country: India
- Presented by: Odisha Diary Foundation
- First award: 11 November 2011; 15 years ago
- Website: orissadiary.com/odisha-living-legend-2016/

Odisha Living Legend Award is a civilian award conferred on people of Odisha who have done outstanding and inspiring work. It was first conferred in 2011 by Odisha Diary Foundation. These awards are given in different categories like Social Service, Public Policy, Education, Youth Inspiration, Sustainable Business, Promotion of Science and Art among others.

In 2018 Odisha Diary Foundation instituted National Living Legend Awards.

== Guests ==
Union Ministers like Jual Oram have attended the Odisha Living Legend Award 2014 award function to felicitate awardees.

Journalist Vinod Dua has attended the Odisha Living Legend Award 2017 award function to felicitate awardees. Vinod Dua was key note speaker in Living Legend Oration in 2017.

== Notable recipients ==
Notable award recipients includeTulasi Munda, Haldhar Nag, Uttam Mohanty, Sabyasachi Mohapatra, Nilamadhav Panda, Prafulla Kar, and Hariprasad Chaurasia, Pratibha Ray.

== National Living Legend Awards ==
- Madhu Pandit Dasa

=== Odisha Living Legend Awards for 2015 ===
- Haldhar Nag (Literature)
- Ramachandra Behera (Literature)
- Sabaramatee Sambhav (Social Service)
- Bijoy Kumar Sahoo ( Business Leadership)
- Dinanath Pathy (Art & Culture)
- Minati Mohaptra (Sports)
- Prafulla Kar (Art & Culture)
- Akshay Parija (Film)

=== Odisha Living Legend Awards for 2016 ===
Sixth Odisha Living Legend and Youth Inspiration and OdishaInc Awards Conferred

- Trilochan Pradhan (Science)
- Dr S K Nanda (Public Policy)
- Bhagaban Meher (Art)
- Prof Amitav Acharya (Education)
- Shruti Mohapatra (Social Service)
- Shiv Sundar Das (Sports)

=== Odisha Living Legend Awards for 2017 ===
7th Odisha Living Legend Award conferred

- Pratibha Satpathy (Literature)
- Kartik Majhi (Social Service)
- Prof. Arnapurna Pandey (Education)
- Chaturbhuj Meher (Art & Culture)
- Prasanta Nanda (Film)
- Subas Pani (Public Policy)

=== Odisha Living Legend Awards for 2018 ===
- Ramakant Rath - (Literature)
- Sisir Mishra (Film)
- Santanu Mishra (Social Service)
- Dutee Chand, Nagpuri Ramesh (Sports)
- Masako Ono (Art & Culture)
