= Nirbachana =

- Directed by: Biplab Ray Chaudhuri
- Written by: Biplab Ray Chaudhuri
- Produced by: National Film Development Corporation & Doordarshan
- Starring: Bhima Singh; Durlav Singh; Bikash Das; Bidyut Prava Patnaik
- Cinematography: Raju Mishra
- Edited by: Biplab Ray Chaudhuri
- Music by: Shantanu Mahapatra
- Distributed by: National Film Development Corporation
- Release date: 1994
- Running time: 100 minutes
- Country: India
- Language: Odia

Nirbachana English: Election ) is a 1994 Indian Oriya drama film directed by Biplab Ray Chaudhuri. The film exposes the maneuvering and corruption of Indian electioneering. A young man is happy to hear the news that the local candidate would offer money for electing him. This money would help him to marry, but he sacrifices the money for an ailing beggar. The story is told through the struggles of several poor villagers of the Indian state of Orissa, each of whom have one of two choices: either working the soil for a wealthy landowner, or "dynamiting" the hills in one of the new quarries—a portrayal of how low humanity can descend when penury and desperation chip away at the social veneer. The film was selected for the Indian Panorama, International Film Festival of India (IFFI) 1996, Delhi.

== Synopsis ==
In this drama, set within an impoverished village in the state of Orissa, a village chieftain hatches an ingenious but morally bankrupt plot to raise enough dowry so that one of his daughters can marry. The townsfolk have two choices for work: they can become farmers or work in the quarries of the richest man around Zamindar. The quarry work is lucrative but destructive to the local environment and to the health of the people forced to breathe in rock dust. The town is in the process of electing a new village chief and to ensure that he is elected, Zamindar pays villagers money for their votes. The chief's family decides to adopt the town beggar, who is dying of tuberculosis. They promise the beggar that they will see that he is cured if he will hand over his vote money. The deal is struck and the chief and his son take him upon the long journey to get cured. Unfortunately, it is a struggle to keep the dying fellow alive until the election and in the end unexpected tragedy ensues.

== Cast ==
- Bhima Singh
- Durlav Singh
- Bikash Das
- Chandra Singh
- Bidyut Prava Patnaik
- Sangita Dutta
- Nikhil Baran Sengupta

== Crew ==
- Nikhil Baran Sengupta – Art Director
- Nagen Barik – Sound

== Music ==
Shantunu Mahapatra arranged the music for this film.

== Reception ==
Reviewing the film at the International Film Festival of India, S. R. Ashok Kumar of The Hindu wrote that "How destructive greed is is told neatly by Biplab Ray Chaudhuri in this film".
