= Nua Bou =

- Directed by: Prabhat Mukherjee
- Produced by: Dhira Biswal; Rama Krushna Tripathy
- Starring: Sarat Pujari; Prashant Nanda; Dhira Biswal; Lila Dulali
- Music by: Balakrishna Das
- Distributed by: Panchasakha Films
- Release date: 9 March 1962
- Country: India
- Language: Odia

Nua Bou is a 1962 Indian Odia film directed by Prabhat Mukherjee, which presents the sociocultural scenario of rural village life in India.

== Synopsis ==
Sura Babu lives with his wife Parbati, brother Raju and son Debi. Parbati loves Raju more than her own son. Parbati falls ill and Raju comes to Puri believing that Lord Jaganath's prasad can cure Parbati and brings prasad. The illness continues and native doctor Das is called in. Parbati is gradually cured. Later Parbati's mother and sister Champa come to stay with her. Parbati's mother is not well disposed towards mischievous Raju and tries to influence Parbati against him. Her efforts fail as Champa takes the side of Raju. Dr. Das's assistant Mukund and doctor Rabi, a newcomer to the village compete for Champa's hand. Dr. Das makes the proposal to Sura Babu on behalf of Mukund for Champa's hand. Sura agrees with a misunderstanding that Doctor Das himself wants to marry Champa. In the meantime, Mukund decides that he is not suitable for Champa. On the marriage day, Sura Babu forces Dr. Das to marry Champa. At the last moment, Raju is found in wedding attire. Mukund comes forward and explains that Champa is in love with Dr. Rabi. The marriage of Rabi and Champa is celebrated.

== Cast ==
- Sarat Pujari
- Prashant Nanda
- Mani Mala
- Dhira Biswal
- Leela Dulali

== Music ==
- Balakrishna Das has arranged music for this film.
- Melodious song by Sikandar Alam & Shipra Bose

== Awards ==
National Film Awards

- 1961: Certificate of Merit for Best Feature Film in Oriya
