= Pahada Ra Luha =

- Directed by: Sabyasachi Mohapatra
- Written by: Sabyasachi Mohapatra
- Produced by: Shushanta Kumar Mohapatra
- Cinematography: Kumar Chodaganga
- Music by: Ramesh Kumar
- Release date: 2015
- Running time: 77 minutes
- Country: India
- Language: Sambalpuri Odia

Pahada Ra Luha (English: Tears of mountain) is a 2015 Indian Sambalpuri language feature film directed by Sabyasachi Mohapatra. The film has won 63rd National Film Awards for Best Feature Film in Odia category.

== Plot ==
The movie is based on industrialisation and subsequent displacement of Paraja tribals in Koraput district. The film deals with problems faced by the ethnic communities of Niyamgiri hills due to rampant mining and rebel activities.

== Cast ==
- Lochani Bag
- Sarat Pujari
- Ashrumochan
- Ashok Mishra
- Swati Ray

== Production ==
Principal photography of the film was started in 1990 but the director was forced to stop the shooting midway due to financial and uncertain reasons. The shooting of the film resumed in June 2015 with the cast unchanged. Due to a 25-year break, the director Sabyasachi made changes in the storyline, in an attempt to appeal to modern audiences. Some artists had died during these 25 years, but Sabyasachi decided to keep the scenes he had shot with them in the film. The film was shot in Koraput and Kalahandi district.

== Awards ==
Award	Date of ceremony	Category	Result	Ref.
63rd National Film Awards	3 May 2015	Best Feature Film in Odia	Won	
26th Odisha State Film Award	12 December 2015	Special Jury Award(Best Film)	Won	
Nasik International Film Festival		Best Odia film	Won	

== See also ==
- 63rd National Film Awards
