= Rajeswari Ray =

Indian actress (died 2022)

- Born: Baleswar, Odisha, India
- Died: 20 July 2022 (37 years); Bhubaneswar
- Other name: Rajeswari Ray Mohapatra
- Occupation: Actress
- Years active: 2008–2022

‌Rajeswari Ray (died 20 July 2022) was an Indian actress and television presenter from Odisha. She started her career as a television presenter and then appeared in popular Odia daily soaps like Basundahara, Sanskar, Devi, Swabhiman, Unasi Kanya, Kumkum, To Pain Mun, etc. In 2008 she debuted in Ollywood through Satyameba Jayate, and later appeared in two more movies like Aare Sathi Aa and Blackmail.

== Filmography ==
=== Odia films ===
Year	Films	Role	Note
2008	Satyameba Jayate		Debuted in Ollywood
2009	Aa Re Sathi Aa		
2018	Blackmail		

=== Television ===
Serial	Channel	Role
Basundhara	DD Odia	
Sanskar	ETV Odia	
Devi	O TV	
Uansi Kanya	Tarang TV	Alaka
Swabhima	Tarang TV	
Kumkum	Colors Odia	
To Pain Mu Mo Pain Tu	Zee Sarthak	Tara Patnaik

== Death ==
She died on 20 July 2022 in a private hospital of Bhubaneswar at 37. She was suffering from brain and lung cancer since 2019.
