= Rabi Mishra =

Indian actor (1957–2021)

- Born: 1957
- Died: 20 January 2021 (aged 64); Bhubaneswar, Odisha, India
- Occupation: Odia actor
- Years active: 1979–2021
- Awards: Odisha State Film Awards, 1998

Rabi Mishra (1957 – 20 January 2021) was an Indian actor who worked in Odia films, television serials, and theatres. He was known for his comedy characters. Mishra played various roles from negative to character artist in many TV series and films, but the character of Gopala Bhanda on the TV series Gopala Rahasya, which aired on DD Odia in 1994, gave him popularity.

He started his acting career in 1979 with the Odia film Ramayan by Dhira Biswal where he played the character of Sugriva. He acted in more than 70 Odia films, including Bhai hela bhagari, Sakala tirtha to charane, Soubhagyabati, and Dhauli Express.

== Death ==
Mishra died on 20 January 2021 at the age of 64 from cardiac arrest. On 19 January, while he was acting for a series he felt pain and was admitted to hospital, but died the next day.
