= Jai Jagannatha =

2007 film by Sabyasachi Mohapatra

- DVD Cover
- Directed by: Sabyasachi Mohapatra
- Written by: Sabyasachi Mohapatra
- Produced by: B.Chintu Maichiya
- Starring: Sarat Pujari; Sadhu Meher; Sritam Das; Jyoti Mishra; Pintu Nanda; Mohini Shilalipi
- Cinematography: Aum Prakash Mohapatra
- Edited by: Rajendra K. Maichiya
- Music by: Late Akshaya Mohanty
- Distributed by: Adlabs
- Release date: 13 July 2007
- Running time: 1270 minutes
- Country: India
- Languages: Odia; Hindi

Jai Jagannatha is a 2007 Indian Sanātana Dharma film directed by Sabyasachi Maichiya, released in 15 languages. Besides Odia and Hindi, its dubbed versions were released in English, Bengali, Assamese, Chhattisgarhi, Bhojpuri, Rajasthani, Punjabi, Gujarati, Marathi, Telugu, Tamil, Malayalam and Nepali languages.

== Synopsis ==
The story of Jai Jagannatha is based on the ancient scripture Laxmi Puran. The untouchables were not allowed to pray, worship and do rituals to God in the ancient ages. Sriya, one of the important characters in this story, dares to pray and worship and wins over the support of Goddess Lakshmi. The real drama begins when Lakshmi is separated by Lord Jagannath at the behest of his brother Balram (Balabhadra) because she ends discrimination on earth by encouraging even untouchables to conduct rituals and worship.

As Lakshmi moves out of Jagannath’s household, Jagannath and Balram undergo immense suffering — so much so that they have to starve without water and food. The curse of Lakshmi had such a severe impact on the brothers that for 12 years they had a tough time. Soon they realised the importance of Lakshmi and were keen to bring her back to their abode. Lakshmi returned to Jagannath’s abode on one condition: There will be no discrimination of caste and creed on earth.

This unique story highlighted that for God everyone was equal besides it reflected the reforms and progressive stance of Gods from the ancient times. Only in the end through Narad it is revealed that Jagannath to end casteism and discrimination had "set up" these series of events which highlighted the social message besides the strength of true spirituality.

== Cast ==
- Sritam Das as God Jagannath
- Jyoti Mishra as Goddess Laxmi
- Pintu Nanda as God Balabhadra
- Mohini Shilalipi as Sriya Chandaluni
- Sadhu Meher as Sriya's father-in-law
- Sarat Pujari as Gajapati King
- Shahnawaz Pradhan as Royal Priest
- Birendra N. Gochhikar
- Mantu Mohapatra
- Debashish as Devarshi Narada
- Ratan Meher as Bikram Sadhaba
- Monalisa as Pramila
- Guna Mohapatra
- Hara Pattanaik as Jeweller (Guest Appearance)
- Pradyumna Lenka
- Ramachandra Pratihari

== Production ==
Filming Location: Puri, Odisha & Umargaon

== Awards ==
- Odisha State Film Award: Best jury award & best editor award.

== Reception ==
Jai Jagannatha, a movie directed by the director Sabyasachi Mohapatra is being released with a record number of 13 languages apart from originals in Odia and Hindi. Jai Jagannatha is a multilingual socio-mythological feature film. State of the art graphics, rich production values and divine music are the highpoints of Jai Jagannatha. This socio-mythological film has six songs in all.
