= Bibhuti Patnaik =

Indian writer

Bibhuti Pattanaik
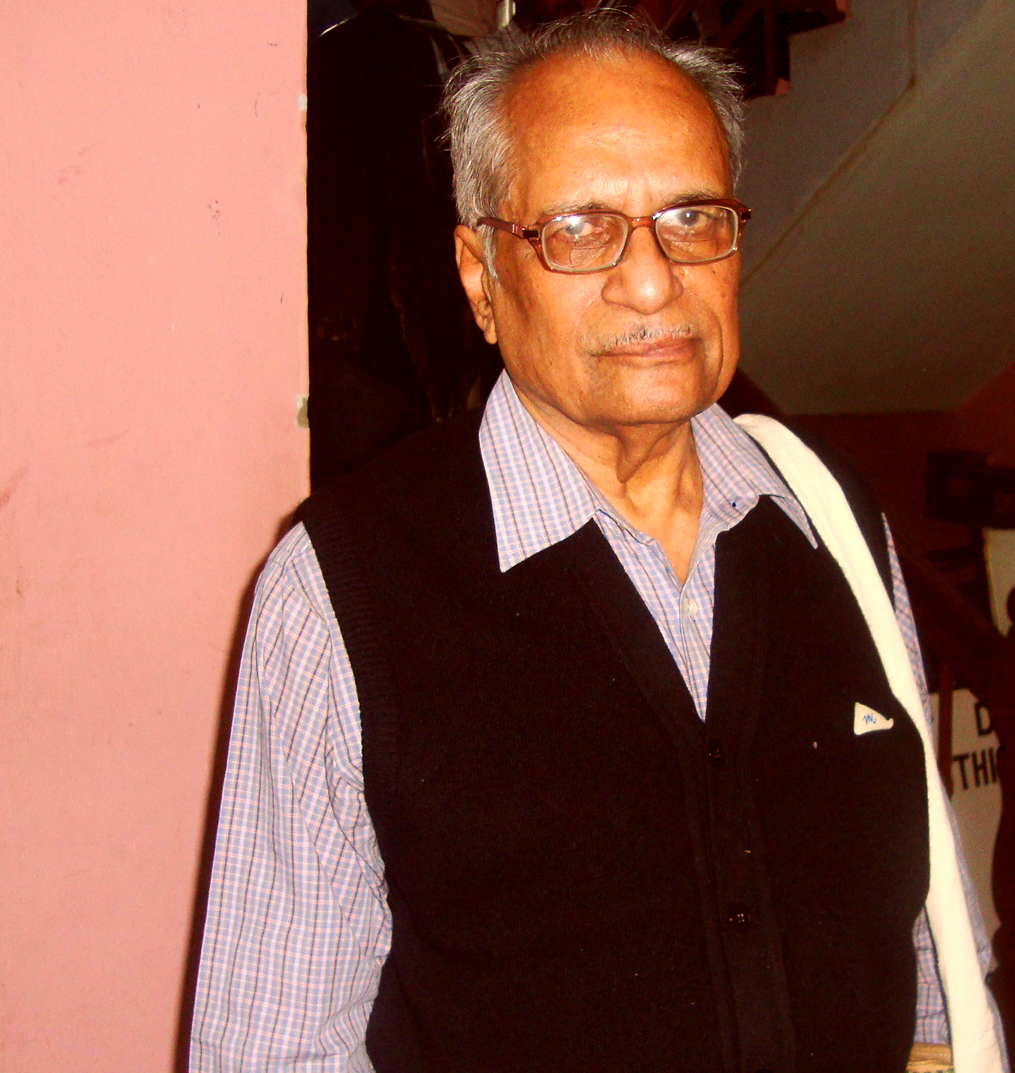
- Born: 25 October 1937 (age 88); Dingeswar, Jagatsinghpur, Odisha, India
- Occupations: Lecturer, Writer
- Spouse: Suraprabha Pattnaik
- Writing career
- Language: Odia
- Notable work: Aswamedhara Ghoda
- Notable awards: Sarala Award, Odisha Sahitya Akademy Award

Signature
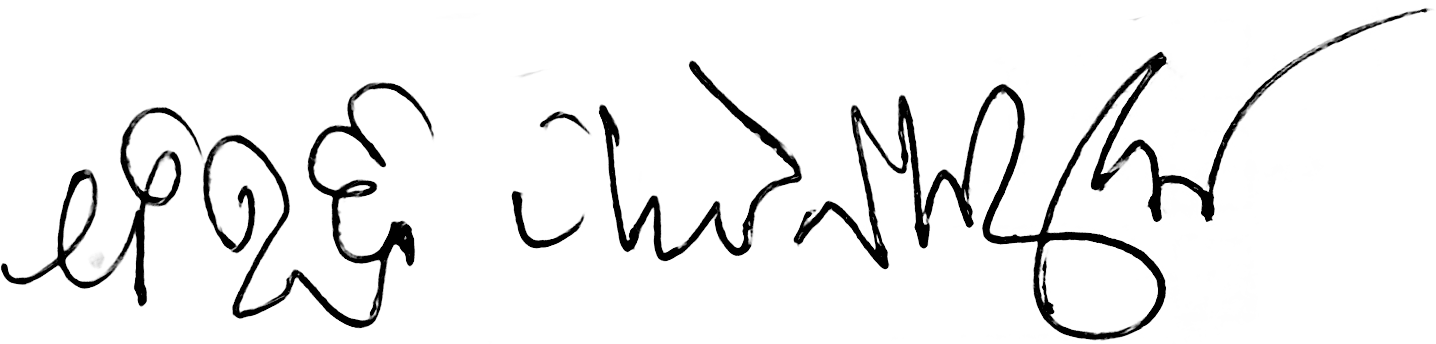

Bibhuti Pattnaik (born 25 October 1937) is an Odia novelist and columnist. Entered as a college lecturer in the Dept.of Odia Language and literature in the year 1970 and retired as a Reader, in the year 1995.

== Literary creations ==
He has more than 150 books to his credit.

- Abhimana (Novel)
- Achinha Akash (novel)
- Adima aranya
- Adina Barsha
- Adina shrabana
- Aei gaon aie mati,
- Aei Mana ekanta Adima (novel)
- Agneyagirire Bana Bhoji
- Akasha Kusuma (novel)
- Andharkarra sidi
- Aneka tarara ratri
- Annya Eka Varatabarsha
- Asabarna
- Ashok banara sita
- Aswamedhara Ghoda (novel)
- Athaa Kathi (novel)
- Badhu Nirupama (novel)
- Bandi jajabara
- Barnamala
- Baula Phulara Basna
- Bhala jhia kharap jhia
- Bidayabela
- Chahala Pnira Dheu
- Chapala Chhanda
- Chhabira Manisha
- Chhaya Chandrika
- Dagdha Phulabana (novel)
- Debakira karabasa
- Dekha Heba Anyadina (novel)
- Dhuli ghara
- Dina Jae Chinha Rahe (novel)
- Dina Kala (novel)
- Dipasikha
- Dipatalara drushya
- Dipata sankha
- Ei mana brundabana
- Ekakini kuntala
- Ekanta adima
- Gare kajwala dhare luha
- Grahana
- Hakim Babu
- Hasakandara chhanda
- He bandhu bidaya
- Irsara Iswari
- Jatila Samparka
- Jibana Sauda (novel)
- Kalabati
- Kala baishakhi
- Kali Kala (novel)
- Kesa bati kanya
- Khelaghara bhangigala
- Madhyanha ra dibaratri
- Mana bhalanahin
- Mayabi hrudaya
- Michhamaya (novel)
- Nadi nari khetra
- Nadi samudra
- Nagapheni
- Nasta charitra
- Nayikara Nama Srabani (novel)
- Nida nahin
- Nisanga bihangi
- Nisanga nakhyatra
- Oda matira swarga
- Panchama Upanyasa (novel)
- Parapurusha
- Prathama Sakala (novel)
- Prema o’ pruthibi
- Premika (Poetries)
- Priya bandhabi
- Priya Purusha (novel)
- Raga anuraga
- Ranganati
- Rani mahumachhi
- Rahu grasha
- Sati asati
- Samaya asamaya
- Samayasoka
- Sandhya dipara sikha
- Sandhyaraga
- Sasthi
- Se dina chaitramasa
- Seli mausi
- Sesha abhinaya
- Sesha Basanta (novel)
- Sesha Ratira Surya (novel)
- Smrutira sudesna
- Snayura Saharare Shantibhanga
- Suvarna
- Sultana
- Topae sindura dipata sankha
- Trutiya Purusha (Novel)
- Tume trushnara jala
- Ujani jamuna
- Adhunika Katha Sahitya
- Aranya Agni O Anyanya
- Arundhatiru Amir khan
- Bharata Bibhajana
- Bibhuti Pattnaik ki chuni hui kahania (Hindi)
- Eswaranka Uthana Patana
- Galpa Samagra
- Gandhi Mahatma (features...)
- Se Eka Pragalva Nadi O AnyanyaKabita
- Tinoti Tarara Akash
- Manabhala Nahin (story)
- Rajakanyara Dukha (story)
- Kete Je Basanta Sate (story)
- Jibanara Jatilata (story)
- Uneisisaha Panchabana
- Nimnagami Mana
- Kichhi Jochhna Kichhi Andhakara
- Nila Akhira Nadi
- Keteje Basanta Sate
- Premagalpa
- Suryamukhi
- Lalita Labangalata
- Akhibujidele Satyajuga
- Nirbachita Galpa (story)
- Kalikal (novel)
- Dwarka Darshan (travelogue)
- Tire Tire Tirths (travelogue)
- Biography Mahatma (travelogue)
- Jana Nayaka (travelogue)
- Jibana Patra mo Bharicha Ketemate (autobiography)

== Literary criticism ==
- Odiya Upanyasara Samajtantwika Rupa Rekha (sociological study of the novels of Fakir Mohan Ganapati, Kalindicharan Panigrahi, Gopinath, Mohanty and Kanhucharan Mohanty Bioneens of Odia novel)
- Sampratika Sahitya (collection of literary essays on contemporary Indian and world literature)
- Sahityara Suchipatra (essays on literary Forms and Movements)
- Biswa Sahityara Biswakarma (life and literature of makers of world literature)
- Iswaranka Uthan-Patana (Rise and fall of God – critical analysis of changing theme of literature

== Awards ==
- Atibadi Jagannath Das Samman, 2016
- Central Sahitya Akademi Award, 2015
- Odisha living legend award, 2012
- Odisha Sahitya Academy, 1985
- Sarala Award, 1999
- Bisuba Melana Award
- Jhankar Award
- Sahitya Bharati Award, 2007
