= Aadim Vichar =

2014 Indian Sambalpuri language film

- Directed by: Sabyasachi Mohapatra
- Screenplay by: Sabyasachi Mohapatra
- Story by: Kapileswar Prasad Mohapatra
- Produced by: Sushant Kumar Mohapatra; Chintu Mohapatra
- Cinematography: Kumar C.Dev Mohapatra
- Edited by: Rajendra Kumar Mohapatra
- Music by: Ghasiram Mishra, Pankaj Jal
- Production company: Mohapatra Movie Magic Pvt. Ltd.
- Distributed by: Reliance Media Works
- Release date: 2014
- Country: India
- Language: Sambalpuri
- Budget: ₹ 50,000,00

Aadim Vichar (English: The Ancient Justice) is a 2014 Indian Sambalpuri language drama film directed by Sabyasachi Mohapatra. The film won 62nd National Film Award for Best Feature Film in Odia and is a sequel to the 2012 movie "Sala Budha". Atal Bihari Panda and Sushree Smita Panda played lead roles in the film.

== Plot ==
Sukru Majhi (Atal Bihari Panda), an 84-year-old Kondh tribal and always a righteous humanist and loving person. He has three sons living with their wives and two grandchildren in a village. Majhi lives a very happy life until an Ayurvedic Practitioner (Vaidya) comes to the village. The Vaidya is a tout and keeps a greedy eye on the lands of the locals.

The Vaidya traps the locals into conspiracy and drags them into litigation, and in return, he captures their land. Somehow he provokes Sukru's eldest son to go against his father and convinces him to file a case against his father for his property. But Sukru smartly makes a statement in front of the judge which surprises the judge and everyone present in the court. He decides to stay with his eldest son (adopted) and requests to give his property to his legitimate sons, the case gets solved in a happy ending.

== Cast ==
- Atal Bihari Panda as Sukru Majhi
- Tapaswini Guru
- Puroshottam Mishra
- Lochani Bag as Sukru Majhi's big Daughter in Law
- Sangeeta Rout as Sukru Majhi's small Daughter in Law
- Pradyumna sahu as sukru majhis Small son
- Purusottam Mishra as Sukru Majhi's Big Son
- Sushree Smita Panda
- Shankar Behera
- Munia Panigrahi

== Soundtrack ==
The movie's songs were Composed by Ghasiram Mishra and Pankaj Jal. "Likri Jhikri" and "Lal Jhara Jhara" both sang by Sarbeswar Bhoi, were declared Hits all over odisha.

Aadim Vichar

Film score by Ghasiram Mishra, Pankaj Jal
- Released: 2014
- Genre: Feature Film Soundtrack
- Length: 14.86
- Language: Sambalpuri language
- Director: Sabyasachi Mohapatra

Original track list
No.	Title	Lyrics	Singer(s)	Length
1.	"Kandha Pila"	Sarbeswar Bhoi	Pankaj Jal, Sarbeswar Bhoi, Laxmi Bag, Sudam	3:20
2.	"Lal Jhara Jhara"	Sarbeswar Bhoi	Sarbeswar Bhoi, Smita Panda	3:45
3.	"Likri Jhikri"	Sarbeswar Bhoi	Sarbeswar Bhoi,	3:16
4.	"Mali Jagei Thila"	Chudamani	Renu Ranjan Bag	3:55
5.	"Nua Bandha"	Netrananda Barik	Manasi Panigrahi, Smita Panda	1:50
Total length:				14:86

== Reception ==
=== Critical response ===
The film got rave reviews from critics upon release.

== Awards and nominations ==
Award	Date of ceremony (Note: Date is linked to the article about the awards held that year, wherever possible.)	Category	Recipient(s) and nominee(s)	Result	Ref.
62nd National Film Awards	3 May 2015	Best Feature Film in Odia	Sabyasachi Mohapatra	Won	
26th Odisha State Film Award	12 December 2015	Best Director	Sabyasachi Mohapatra	Won	
26th Odisha State Film Award	12 December 2015	Best Actor	Atal Bihari Panda	Won	
26th Odisha State Film Award	12 December 2015	Best Supporting Actress	Lochani Bag	Won	
26th Odisha State Film Award	12 December 2015	Best Screen Play	Sabyasachi Mohapatra	Won	
26th Odisha State Film Award	12 December 2015	Special Jury Award(Best Film)	Biswanath Swain	Won	
