= Bhukha =

1989 film by Sabyasachi Mohapatra

- Directed by: Sabyasachi Mohapatra
- Starring: Sarat Pujari; Sadhu Meher
- Music by: Ramesh Kumar Mahananda; Khiti Pathi Sahu
- Release date: 1989
- Country: India
- Language: Sambalpuri

Bhukha is a 1989 Indian Sambalpuri-language film directed by Sabyasachi Mohapatra. The movie was produced by Mohapatra under the banner of Kumar Productions and had music by Ramesh Kumar Mahananda. This movie is based on the Sambalpuri play Bhukha written by Manglu Charan Biswal. It was the first film from Odisha to get an International Jury Award at the Gijón International Film Festival.

== Synopsis ==
This film portrays the plight of the "Bajnia Dombos" or Dombo community of Odisha who are traditionally drummers by profession and the negative impact of cultural dominance by dominant class of people.

== Cast ==
- Sarat Pujari
- Sadhu Meher
- Bijaya Pujari
- Swati Roy
- Chitta Pattnaik
- Mantu Mahapatra
- Narahari Patel
- Jagadananda Chhuria
- Netrananda Barik

== Songs ==
- Aarati Taarini Go Asta Udaya Arate Je Chinte
- Malli Phuti Mahakila Ranga Rasiaa Ke
- Phatai Khaili Bella Kukila Re
- Subha Lagane Bara Kale Gamana Ho

== Awards and nominations ==
- International Jury Award at Gijon International Film Festival, Spain, 1990.
- Selected for World Rural Film Festival, Aurrilac, France.

== See also ==
- Sambalpuri Cinema
