= Manjula Kanwar =

Actor

- Occupation: Actress

Manjula Kanwar is an Indian actress known for her work in Odia cinema. She has acted in two films: Bhangala Silata (1998) and Raju Awara (2012). She won the National Film Award for Best Supporting Actress for her performance in Bhangala Silata.
