= Sri Lokanath =

1960 Odia film

- poster
- Directed by: Prafulla Sengupta
- Written by: Aswini Kumar Ghosh
- Screenplay by: Premendra Mitra.
- Produced by: Ruprang Pvt Ltd.
- Starring: Akshaya Mohanty; Manimala; Urbashi; Dukhiram Swain
- Cinematography: Ramananda Sen Gupta
- Edited by: Sukumar Sengupta
- Music by: Balakrushna Das
- Release date: 1960
- Country: India
- Language: Odia

Sri Lokanath is a 1960 Indian Odia-language film directed by Prafulla Sengupta and based on a story by Aswini Kumar Ghosh. This Indian socio-fantasy film won a National Film Award in 1960, and was the 11th Odia film produced under Ruprang Pvt. Ltd. It was the first Odia film to receive a National Award.

== Plot ==
Dr Ajay Patanayak is an atheist. His wife, Basanti, has no children and has immense faith in God. She is also very close to her brother-in-law, Bijay. Laxmi, a neighbour, is in love with Bijay. He visits Puri's Sri Lokanath Temple to ask for a blessing, hoping that Basanti will have a son. Basanti becomes pregnant and gives birth to a son. The happy family name the child Lokanath, after the deity. However, as Lokanath grows up, Bijay feels neglected by the family and leaves home. He becomes a tutor in Jaipur. Meanwhile, his love interest, Laxmi, marries a zamindar named Surya from Puri.

Three years later, Basanti and her husband try to offer an oblation to Lord Sri Lokanath in Puri, but a storm stops them from visiting the temple. Lokanath is bitten by a snake and his body is taken to the cremation ground. Basanti, who has now developed amnesia, embarks on a pilgrimage with her husband. Meanwhile, Bijay is involved in an accident and becomes partially insane.

Several years later, Laxmi and Surya have a daughter named Uma, who falls in love with Ashok, Prakash's son and Surya's friend. One day, while Ashok is driving, a madman jumps onto his car. Ashok takes the man to Uma's house, where she recognises him as Bijay. Ajay and Basanti are informed of this. At the same time, Bijay partially regains his memory at the Sri Lokanath Temple.

Basanti is attracted to Ashok and tries to arrange Uma's marriage to him. However, after seeing Ashok's childhood photograph, Prakash reveals that Ashok is not his son. Ajay and Basanti recognise Ashok as their son, Loknath. The whole family is reunited and they all go to the temple together. Finally, Ajay admits that a higher power guides human destiny.

== Cast ==
- Akshaya Mohanty
- Manimala
- Urbashi
- Dukhiram Swain
- Samuel Sahu Baby

== Soundtrack ==
1. "Phoola Rasiyare" - Sandhya Mukherjee
2. "Chanhena Chanhena Michha E Bandhana"
3. "Tuki Paradeshi Nija Deshe"
4. "Aji Akashe Ki Ranga Lagila Chora Pabane"

== Awards ==
National Film Awards

- 1960: President's silver medal for Best Feature Film in Oriya
