= Nikhil Baran Sengupta =

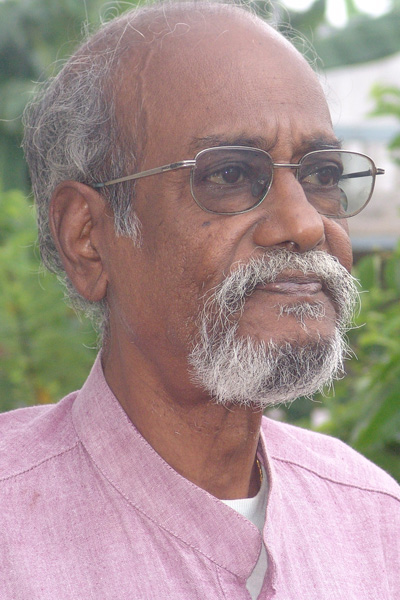
- Born: Nikhil Baran Sengupta; 13 December 1943; Chittagong, Bengal Presidency, British India
- Died: 18 February 2014 (aged 70); Bhubaneswar, Odisha, India
- Occupations: art director, actor, painter and production designer
- Years active: 1976–2014
- Spouse: Bijoya Sengupta

Nikhil Baran Sengupta (13 December 1943 – 18 February 2014) was an Indian Hindi, Bengali, and Odia art director, actor, painter and production designer. He made his debut as an art-director with "Gapa hele be Sata" (1975). His contribution to the success of films such as Janani (1984), Sahari Bagha (1985), Maa O Mamata, Suna Chadhei (1987), Jugantar, Tahader Katha, Bagh Bahadur (1989) and Mr. and Mrs. Iyer (2002) had always been acknowledged but less talked about.

In his 40 years of career span in the film industry, he was instrumental in encouraging young talents from Orissa to take center stage. In 1994, he was awarded as the Best Art Director for "Janani" and in 2009, he was awarded the Guru Kelu Charan award in the lifetime achievement category.

== Early life ==
Sengupta grew up in Cuttack, the former capital and the largest city of the state of Odisha, India. He did his early schooling at the Ranihat School in Cuttack, and later went to the Ravenshaw University, but his heart was with the world of art, which took him to Kolkata to study art at the Government College of Art & Craft.

Upon completion of his studies in 1969, he worked with a number of advertising firms, as a visualiser and as an illustrator for several magazines. He delved into painting and had a few exhibitions of his works. However, once he got into the film industry, he did not have any time to look back.

== Career ==
Nikhil has worked on over 100 films in three languages: Odia, Bengali and Hindi.

He has collaborated with 35 directors, including Aparna Sen, Buddhadeb Dasgupta, Manmohan Desai, Amol Palekar, Prasant Nanda, Biplab Roy Choudhury, Nitai Palit, Govind Tej and Raju Mishra.

His debut was Gapa Helebi Sata, Odia film industry's first color.

== Personal life ==
Nikhil Da was married to Bijoya Sengupta. They had two sons- Neel Sengupta and Biman Sengupta. Whenever he had time from his shoots, Nikhil da loved to paint with water colours at his leisure. He died 18 February 2014 aged 70.

== Filmography ==
=== Art director ===
- Tora mora katha heba chup chap (2011)
- Ae Milana Juga Jugara (2010)
- Aaynate (2008)
- Pari Mahal (2003)
- Mr. and Mrs. Iyer (2002)
- House of Memories (2000)
- Nirbachana (1994)
- Suna Bhauja (1994)
- Bastra Haran (1991)
- Chakadola Karuchi Leela (1990)
- Maa Mate Shakti De (1990)
- Asuchi Mo Kalia Suna (1989)
- Bagh Bahadur (1989)
- Bidhira Bidhan (1989)
- Pua Moro Kala Thakura (1988)
- Chaka Aakhi Sabu Dekhuchi (1987)
- Suna Chadhei (1987)
- Tunda Baida (1987)
- Sahari Bagha (1985)
- Chaka Bhaunri (1985)
- Hakim Babu (1985)
- Jaga Hatare Pagha (1985)
- Samay Bada Balwan (1985)
- Janani (1984)
- Hisab Nikas (1982)
- Naiyya (1979)
- Balidan (1978)
- Galpa Helebi Sata (1976)
- Shesha Shrabana (1976)

=== Actor ===
- Pari Mahal (2003)
- The Square Circle (1996)
- Nirbachan (1994)
- Asuchi Mo Kalia Suna (1989)

=== Production designer ===
- Yugant (1995)
- Shivalika (2013)
