= National Film Award for Best Odia Feature Film =

Indian film award

- National award for contributions to Indian Cinema
- Awarded for: Best Odia feature film of the year
- Sponsored by: National Film Development Corporation of India
- Formerly called: President's Silver Medal for Best Feature Film in Odia (1960–1968); National Film Award for Best Feature Film in Odia (1969–2021)
- Rewards: Rajat Kamal (Silver Lotus); ₹2,00,000
- First award: 1960
- Most recent winner: Pushkara (2023)

The National Film Award for Best Odia Feature Film is one of the National Film Awards presented annually by the National Film Development Corporation of India. It is one of several awards presented for feature films and awarded with Rajat Kamal (Silver Lotus).

The National Film Awards, established in 1954, are the most prominent film awards in India that merit the best of the Indian cinema. The ceremony also presents awards for films in various regional languages.

The films made in Odia language were not considered until the 8th National Film Awards ceremony held in March 1961. The 1960 Prafulla Kumar Sengupta directorial film Sri Lokanath received the first president's silver medal for Best Feature Film in Odia. Since the 70th National Film Awards, the name was changed to "Best Odia Feature Film".

== Winners ==
Award includes 'Rajat Kamal' (Silver Lotus Award) and cash prize. Following are the award winners over the years:

Awards legends
*	President's Silver Medal for Best Feature Film
*	Certificate of Merit for the Second Best Feature Film
*	Certificate of Merit for the Third Best Feature Film
*	Certificate of Merit for the Best Feature Film

List of award films, showing the year (award ceremony), producer(s) and director(s)
Year	Film(s)	Producer(s)	Director(s)	Refs.
1960 (8th)	Sri Lokanath	Rupa Raga Pvt Ltd.	Prafulla Kumar Sengupta	
1961 (9th)	Nua Bou	Ram Krishna Tripathy	Prabhat Mukherjee	
1962 (10th)	Suryamukhi	Soumendra Misra	P. K. Sengupta	
1962 (10th)	Lakshmi	Parvati Ghose and G. P. Ghose	Sarda Naik	
1963 (11th)	Jeevan Sathi	Srinibash Paikaroy	Prabhat Mukherjee	
1963 (11th)	Nari	Narendra Kumar Mitra	Narendra Kumar Mitra, Amalendu Bagehi and Kavichandra Kalicharan Patnaik	
1964 (12th)	Sadhana	Diamond Valley Production	Prabhat Mukherjee	
1964 (12th)	Naba Janma	Pancha Sakha Pictures	Sachin Mukherji	
1965 (13th)	No Award			
1966 (14th)	Kaa	Parbati Ghose	Sidhartha	
1967 (15th)	Arundhati	Dhiren Patnaik	Prafulla Sengupta	
1968 (16th)	Stree	Parbati Ghose	Sidhartha	
1969 (17th)	No Award			
1970 (18th)	No Award			
1971 (19th)	No Award			
1972 (20th)	No Award			
1973 (21st)	No Award			
1974 (22nd)	No Award			
1975 (23rd)	No Award			
1976 (24th)	Shesha Shrabana	Nagen Roy	Prashant Nanda	
1977 (25th)	Chilika Teerey	Shyamghan Rai Chaudhari	Biplab Rai Chaudhari	
1978 (26th)	No Award			
1979 (27th)	Shri Krishnaka Rasalila			
1980 (28th)	No Award			
1981 (29th)	Seeta Raati	Balram Misra	Manmohan Mahapatra	
1982 (30th)	No Award			
1983 (31st)	Neeraba Jhada	Manmohan Mahapatra	Manmohan Mahapatra	
1984 (32nd)	Klanta Aparahna	Dynamic Studio	Manmohan Mahapatra	
1985 (33rd)	Hakim Babu	Amiya Ranjan Patnaik	Pranab Das	
1986 (34th)	Majhi Pahacha	Dipti Mohanty	Manmohan Mahapatra	
1987 (35th)	Nishidhdha Swapna	Manmohan Mahapatra	Manmohan Mahapatra	
1988 (36th)	Kichi Smruti Kichi Anubhuti	K. Jagadeswari	Manmohan Mahapatra	
1989 (37th)	Andha Diganta	Vox Visuals Pvt. Ltd.	Manmohan Mahapatra	
1990 (38th)	No Award			
1991 (39th)	Tara	Bijaya Jena	Bijaya Jena	
1992 (40th)	Vinya Samaya	Shankar Gope	Manmohan Mahapatra	
1993 (41st)	Aranya Rodana	Prasan Prusti	Biplab Ray Chaudhuri	
1994 (42nd)	No Award			
1995 (43rd)	Moksha	Jayadev Mallick and Pramoda Kumar Nayak	Gouri Shankar Das and Malaya Kumar Roy	
1996 (44th)	Shunya Swaroopa	Alaya Kumar Mohanty	Himanshu Sekhar Khatua	
1997 (45th)	Shesha Drushti	NFDC	Apurba Kishore Bir	
1998 (46th)	Nandan	N'CYP	Apurba Kishore Bir	
1999 (47th)	Biswaprakash	NFDC	Susant Misra	
2000 (48th)	No Award			
2001 (49th)	Magunira Shagada	NFDC	Prafulla Mohanty	
2002 (50th)	No Award			
2003 (51st)	Aw Aaakare Aa	Subash Das	Subash Das	
2004 (52nd)	No Award			
2005 (53rd)	Kathantara	Iti Rani Samanta	Himanshu Khatua	
2006 (54th)	Puja Pain Phulatie	Padmini Puty	Gadadhar Puty	
2007 (55th)	No Award			
2008 (56th)	No Award			
2009 (57th)	No Award			
2010 (58th)	No Award			
2011 (59th)	No Award			
2012 (60th)	No Award			
2013 (61st)	No Award			
2014 (62nd)	Aadim Vichar	Mohapatra Movie Magic Pvt. Ltd.	Sabyasachi Mohapatra	
2015 (63rd)	Pahada Ra Luha	Mohapatra Movie Magic Pvt. Ltd.	Sabyasachi Mohapatra	
2016 (64th)	No Award			
2017 (65th)	Hello Arsi	Ajaya Routray	Sambit Mohanty	
2018 (66th)	No Award			
2019 (67th)	Saala Budhar Badla	New Generation Films	Sabyasachi Mohapatra	
2019 (67th)	Kalira Atita	Eleenora Images Pvt Ltd.	Nila Madhab Panda	
2020 (68th)	No Award			
2021 (69th)	Pratikshya	Anupam Patnaik	Anupam Patnaik	
2022 (70th)	Daman	JP Motion Pictures and Mentis Films	Vishal Mourya and Debi Prasad Lenka	
2023 (71st)	Pushkara	Tarang Cine Productions	Subhransu Das	
2024 (72nd)	Lahari	Jhilik Motion Pictures	Amartya Bhattacharyya	
