= Amiya Patnaik =

Indian filmmaker

- Born: Amiya Ranjan Patnaik; 1955
- Died: 19 October 2018 (aged 63); New Delhi, India
- Occupations: Director, Producer, Playwright
- Years active: 1985–2017
- Known for: Filmmaking
- Notable work: Hakim Babu, Tulasi Apa
- Children: Anupam Patnaik

Amiya Patnaik (Odia: ଅମିୟ ପଟନାଏକ) was an Indian filmmaker and producer in the Odia film industry called Ollywood. His notable works were Hakim Babu and Tulasi Apa. The former won the 33rd National Film Awards for Best Feature Film in Odia and the latter winning the Odisha State Film Award in Six Categories.

== Career ==
Patnaik worked prominently in the Odia film industry(Ollywood). He made his directorial debut with "Mamata Mage Mula (1985)". The movie was also his first venture as a producer. Since then he never looked back, he produced films like Hakim Babu (1985) which bags National award for Best feature film in Odia Category. Back in 2015, Patnaik was decided to come back as director with ‘Tulasi Apa’ which won State Film Awards in six categories including Best film and Best Director. The movie was based on veteran social activist and Padma Shri awardee Tulasi Munda, was released in theatres to critical acclaim in 2017.

== Death ==
Patnaik was diagnosed with pancreatic cancer. He had been undergoing treatment at a private hospital in Gurgaon. When his health was very critical, he shifted to a private hospital in New Delhi where he died at 7.59 am on 19 October 2018.

== Filmography ==
Year	Film	Director	Producer	Writer	Notes	Source
1984	Mamata Mage Mula	Yes	Yes		Directorial Debut	
1985	Hakim Babu		Yes		Won National Award for Best Feature Film in Odia	
1988	Pua Mora Kala Thakura		Yes			
1990	Chaka Akhi Sabu Dekhuchi		Yes			
1991	Asuchi Mo Kalia Suna		Yes			
1992	Chaka Dola Karuchi Leela		Yes			
1998	Moner Moto Mon		Yes			
1998	Raja Rani		Yes			
1999	Pardesi Babu		Yes	Yes		
2004	Parimahal		Yes			
2015	Tulasi Apa	Yes			Won Odisha State Film Award for Best film	
