= Pratikshya =

- Pratikshya movie poster
- Directed by: Anupam Patnaik
- Written by: Roshan Bisoi; Gourahari Das
- Produced by: Anupam Patnaik
- Starring: Dipanwit Dashmohapatra; Choudhury Jayprakash Das; Barsha Patnaik; Sreela Tripathy; Siddhanta Mahapatra
- Cinematography: Deepak Kumar
- Edited by: Deven Mishra
- Music by: Ankesh Anand; Ashish Pradhan; Bivash Rath
- Release date: 2 December 2022
- Country: India
- Language: Odia

Pratikshya is a 2022 Indian Odia language drama film, produced & directed by Anupam Patnaik. The film is written by Roshan Bisoi and inspired from a short story, Bapa written by Gourahari Das. Ankesh Anand, Ashish Pradhan and Bivash Rath being the music composer of the film, the cinematography is being handled by Deepak Kumar. Anupam Kher announced to produce and act in its Hindi remake.

The film follows the journey of Sanjay a middle-class unemployed youth whose only goal is to get a Government job. Life throws a curveball at him when his father suddenly becomes ill. With no job & money, he struggles to stay afloat with his inner desires.

== Plot ==
Set in Bhubaneswar around a typical middle-class family, Pratikshya is a story about dreams, desperation, and aspirations. Like every unemployed graduate, Sanjay is adamant about finding a government job. Bipin, his father tries hard to convince Sanjay to do any job as his retirement is at bay. The family is already burdened with loans taken for Sanjay's elder sisters Supriya's wedding. The buck stops when Bipin is diagnosed with a terminal illness and Sanjay faces the dilemma of securing a government job and saving his father.

== Cast ==
- Dipanwit Dashmohapatra as Sanjay
- Choudhury Jayaprakash Das as Sanjay's father
- Barsha Patnaik as Kalyani
- Sreela Tripathy as Sanjay's mother
- Sidhant Mohapatra (guest appearance) as a doctor
- Roshan Bisoi as Bijit
- Roopambika Nayak
- Susil Mishra
- Abakash Mishra

== Release ==
=== Festival screening ===
Pratikshya was screened in Indian Panorama section of IFFI 2022 and has won the Best Story Feature Film Award at the Washington DC South Asia Film Festival (DCSAFF) 2022.

== Reception ==
A critic from Kalinga TV wrote that "Odia film ‘Pratikshya’ is an excellent film. Based on a short story written by noted writer Gourahari Das, the plot of ‘Pratikshya’ revolves around sorrow, happiness as well as failure and success of an Odia middle-class family". A critic from Orissa Post wrote that "Though the first half of the film feels a bit stretched and the second half a little shrunk, Pratikshya, which is based on a short story titled Bapa by Gourahari Das, with its subtletly and nuances stands confident as a film and a piece of art". Anupam Kher has announced its Hindi remake in IFFI press conference.

== Awards ==
- National Film Award for Best Feature Film in Odia
