= Tulasi Apa =

- Directed by: Amiya Patnaik
- Produced by: Anupam Patnaik
- Starring: Barsha Nayak; Madhusmita; Sujit Paikray; Choudhury Bikas Das; Premanjan Parida; Lochani Bag
- Cinematography: Arjun Jena
- Music by: Pankaj Jal
- Release dates: 2015 (Kolkata Film Festival); 19 May 2017
- Running time: 121 minutes
- Language: Odia

Tulasi Apa is a 2015 first Odia biographical film, produced by Anupam Patnaik and directed by Amiya Patnaik. The film depicts the life of Tulasi Munda, an educator and social activist from Keonjhar, Odisha. The film was released on 19 May 2015.

The film introduces Barsha Nayak as the main protagonist. The film has been critically acclaimed and won numerous awards including Six Odisha State awards in 2015. It was officially selected in Bengaluru, Kolkata, Tehran and other film festivals. Barsha Nayak got the best actress award in Haryana Film festival. The film also won the best film award in Shimla Film Festival

Goutam Giri And Antara Chakraborty Also won State Award for the Best Singer in 2015

== Plot ==
Born and brought up in a tribal region of Odisha, 'Padmashri' Tulasi Munda did not allow the poverty, illiteracy and un-development of her locality to dishearten her, discourage her or dampen her spirit. She took a humble step to educate her fellow beings, which grew into a huge movement. Be it urban-rural divide or conflict of mines-owner and workers or exploitation of the have-nots by the haves, Tulasi Munda protested each and every act of injustice and discrimination and turned the tide in favour of her fellow beings.

The film encapsulates the essence of Tulasi Munda's life. It enumerates her struggle and highlights her achievements.

== Cast ==
- Barsha Nayak as Tulasi Munda
- Madhusmita as young Tulasi Munda
- Sujit Paikray as Sahrai Oram
- Mamata Panda as Janha
- Lochani Bag as Ghasa Munda, Tulasi Munda's Mother
- Premanjan Parida as Tulasi Munda's Father
- Netrananda Barik as Tulasi Munda's Uncle
- Kanakalata Das as Tulasi Munda's Aunty
- Kajal Satpathy as Jhingi
- Debananda Sony as Jhingi's Husband
- Susil Mishra as Nabakrishna Chaudary

== Production ==
The research started on 2014 November by Abha Rani Bal. She was a primary school teacher in Barbil. She used to travel every week to Serenda, Tulasi Munda's home to meet her and get the story from her. After months of meetings, discussions and research the script was formed by the end of 2014. Barsha Nayak, who portrays the lead character was shortlisted from some auditions. She had to travel from Hyderabad to Bhubaneswar frequently for the shooting as she was working in an IT company in Hyderabad. The workshop started in Bhubaneswar in January 2015, followed by the shooting in February first week. The entire schedule was completed in 30 days.

The film is shot in and around Keonjhar, Joda and Barbil all mining areas, and original locations where Tulasi Munda had grown up and spent her entire childhood.

According to the director the most difficult part, as it was with biopic Tulasi Apa is that one cannot take cinematic liberties. Most of the time people are sure, that while making a biopic, you will end up making a documentary if you are going to be inflexible. How to dramatise a person's life, without making it look like a documentary – that was the challenge. 'And when you end up doing it correctly, I think it's a tremendous achievement' said Amiya Patnaik.

== Music ==
The music for Tulasi Apa has been composed by Pankaj Jal, and the lyrics has been penned down Nimai Mohanty. The music rights of the film has been acquired by Eastern Media Entertainment.

Tulasi Apa

Soundtrack album by Pankaj Jal
- Released: 19 May 2017
- Recorded: 2017
- Genre: Feature Film Soundtrack
- Length: 16.03
- Label: Eastern Media
- Producer: Anupam Patnaik

Track Listing
No.	Title	Singer(s)	Length
1.	"Dui Ek Dui"	Ira Mohanty, Pankaj Jal	4.00
2.	"Makar Mela"	Bulu, Manasi	4.17
3.	"Jibana Pradipa"	Ira Mohanty	4.41
4.	"Andha Kupa"	Subhas Das	3.45
Total length:			16.03

== Release ==
=== Festival Screening ===
Tulsi Apa premiered in the 21st Kolkata International Film Festival in 2015. It was also screened at 4th Tehran Jasmine International Film Festival, the first Odia film to be screen there. It has won best feature film in 2nd International Film Festival of Shimla. It was also screened at Nashik International Film Festival, the Bengaluru International Film Festival and the 1st Haryana International Film Festival.

=== Theatre Release ===
Tulasi Apa is slated to hit the theatres on 19 May 2017 at several single theatres across India.

=== Streaming release ===
Tulasi Apa was released on Amazon Prime videos in November 2019. It is the first Odia language movie to be released on Amazon Prime videos worldwide.

== Accolades ==
Year	Award	Category	Recipient(s) and nominee(s)	Result	Ref
2015	27th Odisha State Film Awards	Best Director	Amiya Pattanaik	Won	
2015	27th Odisha State Film Awards	Best Actress	Barsha Nayak	Won	
2015	27th Odisha State Film Awards	Best Music	Pankaj Jaal	Won	
2015	27th Odisha State Film Awards	Best Playback Singer – Male	Gautam Giri	Won	
2015	27th Odisha State Film Awards	Best Playback Singer – Female	Antra Chakarbarti	Won	
2015	27th Odisha State Film Awards	Best Cinematography	Arjun Jena	Won	
2015	27th Odisha State Film Awards	Best Dialogue	Chinmay Das Pattnaik	Won	
2015	27th Odisha State Film Awards	Best Child Artist	Madhusmita Maharana	Won	
2015	21st Kolkata International Film Festival	Official Selection		Nominated	
2016	4th Tehran Jasmine International Film Festival	Official Selection		Nominated	
2016	Bengaluru International Film Festival	Official Selection		Nominated	
2016	Nashik International Film Festival	Official Selection		Nominated	
2016	Golden Triangle Film Festival	Official Selection		Nominated	
2016	2nd International Film Festival of Shimla	Best Feature Film	Anupam Patnaik	Won	
2016	1st Haryana International Film Festival	Best Actress	Barsha Nayak	Won	
2016	Chalachitra Jagat Awards	Best Film	Anupam Patnaik	Won	
2016	Chalachitra Jagat Awards	Best Director	Amiya Pattanaik	Won	
2016	Chalachitra Jagat Awards	Best Actress	Barsha Nayak	Won	
2016	Chalachitra Jagat Awards	Best Cinematography	Arjun Jena	Won	
2016	Cinema Sansar Awards	Best Film	Anupam Patnaik	Won	
2016	Cinema Sansar Awards	Best Popular Actress	Barsha Nayak	Won	
2016	Cinema Sansar Awards	Best Popular Producer	Anupam Patnaik	Won	
2016	Cinema Sansar Awards	Best Director	Amiya Pattanaik	Won	
2017	Roopnagar Mayanagri Star Screen Awards	Best Film	Anupam Patnaik	Won	
2017	Roopnagar Mayanagri Star Screen Awards	Best Actress	Barsha Nayak	Won	
2017	Roopnagar Mayanagri Star Screen Awards	Best Director	Amiya Pattanaik	Won	
2017	Showtime Awards, Belabhumi, Puri	Best Actress	Barsha Nayak	Won	
2017	Showtime Awards, Belabhumi, Puri	Best Director	Amiya Pattanaik	Won	
2017	Showtime Awards, Belabhumi, Puri	Best Film	Anupam Patnaik	Won	
2017	Showtime Awards, Belabhumi, Puri	Best Screenplay and Dialogues	Chinmay Das Pattnaik	Won	
2017	Banichitra Awards	Best Director (Critics)	Amiya Pattanaik	Won	
2017	Banichitra Awards	Best Actress (Critics)	Barsha Nayak	Won	
2017	Banichitra Awards	Best Film (Critics)	Anupam Patnaik	Won	
