= Hakim Babu =

- Directed by: Pranab Das
- Written by: Bijay Mishra (dialogues)
- Screenplay by: Pranab Das
- Based on: Hakim Babu by Bibhuti Patnaik
- Produced by: Amiya Patnaik
- Starring: Ajit Das; Jaya Swami; Bijaya Jena
- Cinematography: Rajan Kinagi
- Edited by: Mukhtar Ahmed
- Music by: Saroj Patnaik
- Production company: Pabitra Entertainment
- Release date: 6 June 1985
- Running time: 163 minutes
- Country: India
- Language: Odia

Hakim Babu is a 1985 Indian Odia-language drama film directed by Pranab Das and starring Ajit Das, Jaya Swami and Bijaya Jena. The film marks the second collaboration between Pranab and Ajit Das after Sesha Pratikhya (1979). The story is based on Bibhuti Patnaik's novel of the same name and talks about industrialization and displacement in an Odisha village.

The film was a box office success and won the National Film Award for Best Feature Film in Odia. Ajit Das became a household name after the release of this film.

== Plot ==
The film was based on the Juang tribe. The film follows Kanhu Majhi as he becomes a collector and helps the people.

== Cast ==
- Ajit Das as Kanhu Majhi / Hakim Babu
- Jaya Swami
- Bijaya Jena
- Bijay Mohanty
- Jayiram Samal
- Dukhiram Swain as Singhapua
- Asit Pati as Sighachhua

== Production ==
Bijaya Jena became a part of the film after Ajit Das approached her in Mumbai. He agreed to pay her since he was the executive producer. She plays a rich, educated girl, who is rude to her elders and her characters is introduced before the song "Mun Tuma Aina".

== Soundtrack ==
The music was composed by Saroj Patnaik.

Track listing
No.	Title	Singer(s)	Length
1.	"Hai Hai Hai"	Usha Mangeshkar	5:21
2.	"Oho Re Aha Aha"	Anuradha Paudwal	4:02
3.	"Kacha Kendu Jharna Amar"	Suresh Wadkar, Haimanti Shukla	5:16
4.	"Kaha Gori Re"	Shabbir Kumar, Anuradha Paudwal	3:49
5.	"Mu Tuma Maina"	Usha Mangeshkar	5:14
6.	"Rakhi Thibu Saiti Kari"	Anuradha Paudwal	4:13
Total length:			27:55

== Awards ==
National Film Award for Best Feature Film in Odia - Pranab Das, Amiya Patnaik

Odisha State Film Awards

- Best Actor - Ajit Das
- Best Actress - Jaya Swami
- Best Photography - Rajan Kinagi
- Art Director - Nikhil Baran Sengupta
