= Gloria Mohanty =

Indian actress

- Born: 27 June 1932; Cuttack, Bihar and Orissa Province, British India
- Died: 11 December 2014 (aged 82); Cuttack, Odisha, India
- Occupation: Actor
- Years active: 1949–2009
- Spouse: Kamala Prasad Mohanty
- Children: 4

Gloria Mohanty (27 June 1932 – 11 December 2014) was an Indian theatre, television and film actress who worked in the Odia film industry. She was honoured with the State's highest honour for contribution to Odia cinema – the Jayadeb Puraskar in 1994 and Odisha Sangeet Natak Akademi Award in 1992. Cultural organisation Srjan awarded her Guru Kelucharan Mohapatra Award for the year of 2011. and Life Time Achievement Award from Cultural organisation Ghungur in 2012.

== Early life ==
At a very young age, Mohanty got introduced to dance and music by her aunt and actress Anima Pedini. She learnt Odissi dance under Guru Kelucharan Mohapatra. At the National Music Association, Cuttack, she got trained in music. She was guided by famed singers as Balakrushna Dash and Bhubaneswar Mishra. Her interest and talent at a young age led to her long career.

Mohanty was a sportswoman and represented the state women's Volleyball team from 1957 to 1960.

== Career ==
Mohanty started her career as a singer at the All India Radio and continued to be a part of the organization for over 20 years. In 1944, she was introduced to theatre through the play 'Bhata' where she played the role of a lead actress. In 1949, she was offered a role on the Odiya movie Sri Jagannath. Her role as Lalita opposite Gopal Ghosh brought her fame and established her as a leading actress

During her career in theatre, she performed in over 100 plays in Odiya, Hindi, Bengali, Urdu and English and these plays were staged in various Indian cities. Mohanty also acted in Odia tele serials like Jibaku Debi Nahi, Thakura Ghara, Sara Akasha and Panata Kani.

== Awards ==
- Best Stage Actress Award by Prajatantra Prachar Samiti in 1952
- Odissa Sangeet Natak Akademi Award in 1992
- Jayadev Samman in 1992
- Gurukelucharan Mohapatra Award in 2011

== Filmography ==
Film/Play	Year	Role
Sri Jagannath	1950	Lalita
Kedar Gouri	1954	Gloria Rout
Maa	1959	
Taapoi	1978	
Tapasya	1980	
Sitarati	1981	
Ulka	1981	
Udaya Bhanu	1983	
Janani	1984	
Chhamana Athaguntha	1986	
Adi Mimansa	1991	
Shasughara Chalijibi	2006	

== Last years and death ==
Mohanty had a stroke and was undergoing treatment. She died on 11 December 2014. Her last rites were performed at the Satichoura Crematoium in Cuttack, Odisha.
