= Bijaya Jena =

Indian actress

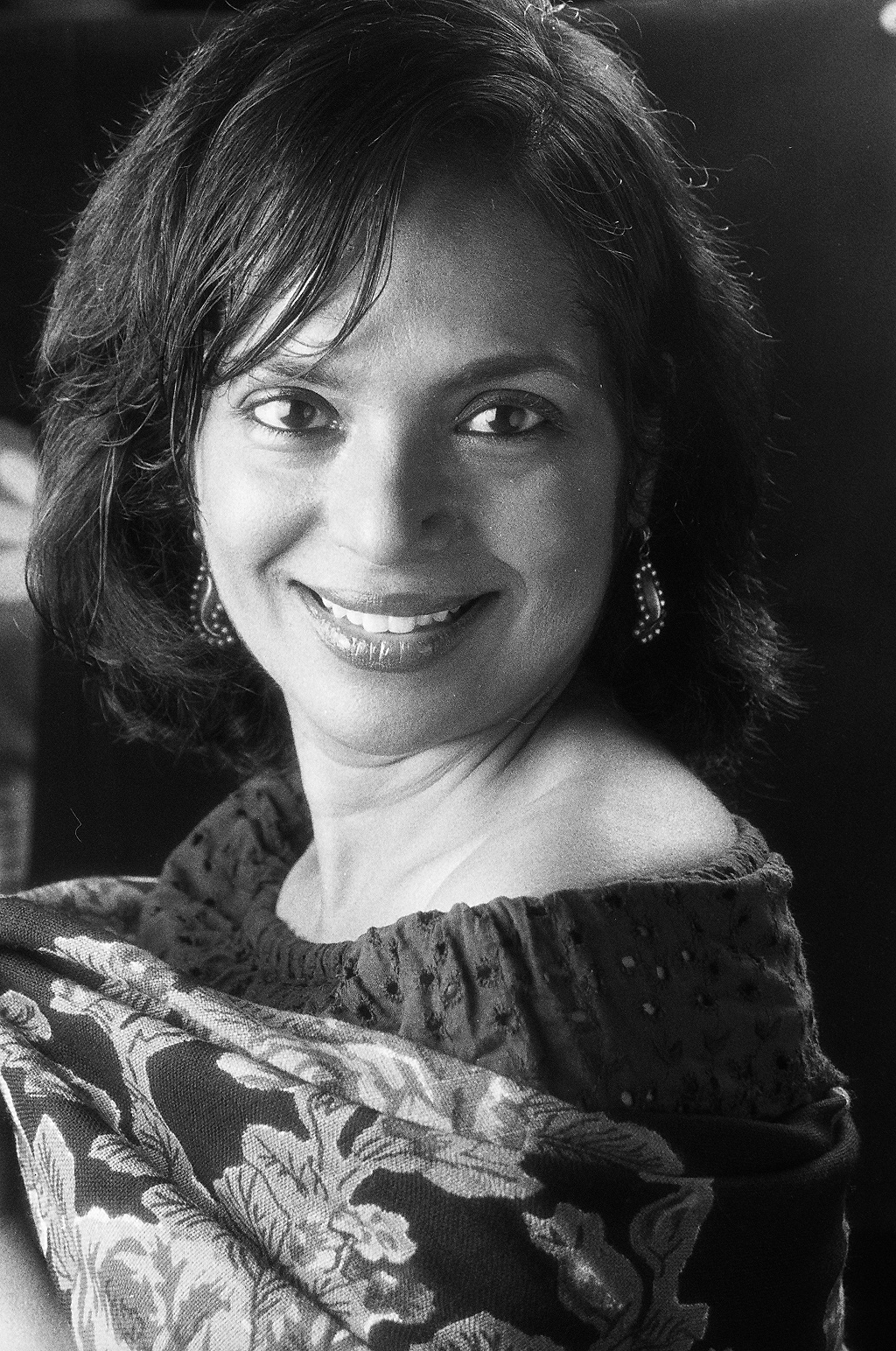
- Bijaya Jena (Dolly Jena)
- Born: 16 August; Cuttack, Odisha, India
- Occupations: Director, producer

Bijaya Jena (born 16 August), also known as Dolly Jena or Bijoya Jena, is an Indian actor, film director and producer. She won the Indian National Film Award (Best director) for the Odia language film Tara.

Jena played Laila in Razia Sultan and then later proceeded to act in some Odia films. After acting in several films, she went on to direct and write several scripts of her own. She served on the Governing Council of FTII from 1992 to 1995.

== Early life ==
Jena was born in Cuttack, Odisha. She is the youngest of three children. Her father late B. C. Jena was a Civil Engineer. In her early teens, Jena enrolled in the Film and Television Institute of India and received her Diploma of Film Acting.

Jena participated in an International Transpersonal Association Conference (a science and religion conference). She later attended a course in Erhard Seminars Training.

== Acting career ==
Jena performed in Hindi and Odia films, television serials like Ek Kahani, Vikram Betaal, Param Veer Chakra, Hira Nila, Aashar Akash and TV plays like Gogol's Inspector General and Mahesh Elkunchwar's Aks Aur Aina. She received the State Award for Best Actress for her performance in the Odia film Jaga Balia. Hindi films include K. A. Abbas's The Naxalites, Kamal Amrohi's Razia Sultan, Ketan Mehta's Holi. She appeared in Hakim Babu which received a National Award for Best Odia Film. Jena also appeared in Ismail Merchant's British film, The Deceivers, directed by Nicholas Meyer.

== Writing, directing and production career ==
In 1992, Jena made her directoral debut with the Odia language film, Tara. She co–wrote the script and produced the film and also played the title role. Tara was based on a short story by Bimal Dutt, who was the main scriptwriter. Tara was completed with a budget of approximately USD $20,000, which Jena borrowed from family members and national and state government agencies. The film received the 1992 National Award for Best Odia Film. The president of the jury, Adoor Gopalakrishnan, described Jena as a promising director. Tara screened at the 1992 Festival International du Cinema Au Feminin in Marseille, France, and at the 1992 Cairo International Film Festival.

Jena's second film, Abhaas (1997) is in the Hindi language. Jena acted, scripted, directed, and produced the film. The film's budget was approximately USD $60,000. The film's script advisor was István Gaál. Abhaas was screened at the 1997 Festival International du Film de la Rochelle, France; the 1997 Penang Film Festival, Malaysia and the 1997 Cairo International Film Festival. In 2013, Abhaas was telecast on BBC Channel 4, BBC as part of the "100 Years of Indian Cinema" celebration. It was also shown by the Mauritius Broadcasting Corporation in October 2014 and has been acquired by SBS Australia in 2025. It was recently screened at the Greek Film Archive in collaboration with Women in Film and Television Greece in 2026. In the same year, Bulgaria also screened it at the Sofia MENAR Film Festival.

In 2016, Jena plans to make a film Danapani ("The Survivor"). Jena wrote the script adapted from the Odia novel by late Gopinath Mohanty. The script was approved by the India National Film Development Corporation.

In 2022, following her stint as part of the international jury panel at Tallinn Black Nights Film Festival, Jena began working on her first English language short film, Winter Interlude with an international crew including the likes of Estonian actor, Ott Aardam and composer Gene Pritsker. It has gone on to participate in film festivals like the Bengaluru International Short Film Festival, Waterfront Indie Film Festival, Hyderabad International Short Film Festival, South Asian Short Film Festival, Cap Spartel International Film Festival, and International Film Festival of South Asia Toronto.

== Acting credits ==
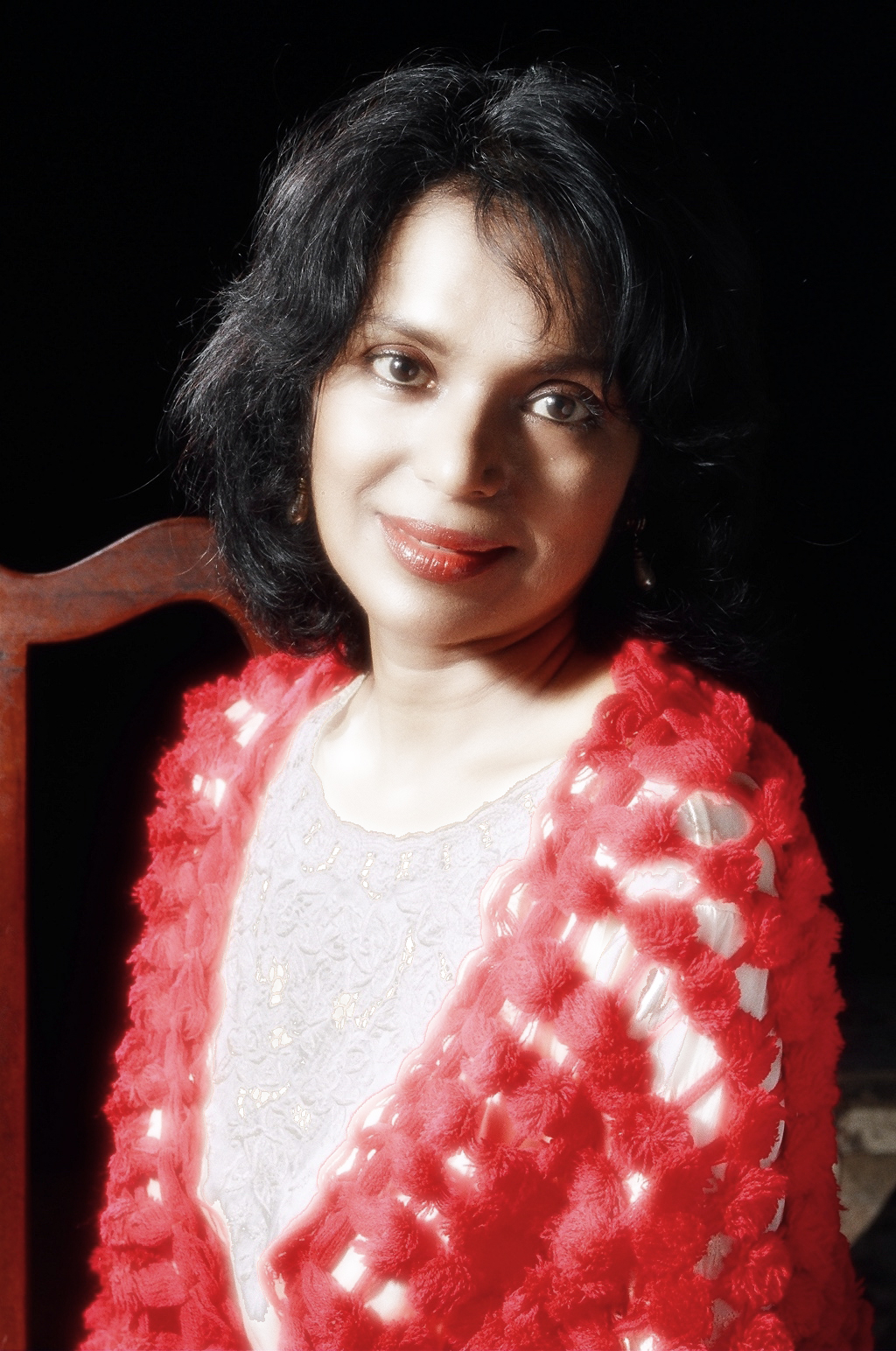
Bijaya Jena in 2005

- Abhaas (Prologue) (1997) (Hindi film)
- Tara (1992) (Odia film)
- Gunehgar Kaun (1991) (Hindi film)
- The Deceivers (1988) (English film)
- Jantar Mantar (1988) (TV Episodes)
- Param Veer Chakra (1988) (TV Episode: Albert Eka)
- Vikram Aur Betaal (1987) (TV Episode no. 10)
- Ek Kahani (1987) (TV episode: Odia story)
- Uparaant (1987) (Hindi film)
- Amma (1986) (Hindi film)
- Hakim Babu (1985) (Odia film)
- Holi (1984 film) (Hindi film)
- Heera Neela (1984) (Odia film)
- Jaga Balia (1984) (Odia film)
- Ashara Akash (1983) (Odia film)
- Razia Sultan (1983) (Hindi film)
- The Naxalites (1981) (Hindi film)

== Awards ==
- Odisha State Film Awards (Best Actress) for Jaga Balia, 1984
- Nominated for Best Actress for "Tara" in Women's Film Festival (Marseille, France, 1992)
- 39th National Film Awards 1992 (Best Regional Film in Odia) for Tara
- Nominated for Golden Pyramid for Hindi film "Abhaas" in Cairo International Film Festival, 1997 (Egypt)
- Lifetime Dedication Award by the 3rd Real Vision Odisha Film Fair Awards (2012)

== Jury member ==
- Member of the jury at the 40th National Film Awards (feature film category), India, 1993
- Member of the jury at Fajr International Film Festival, Iran, 2007
- Member of the jury at the 1st Kish International Film Festival, Iran, 2011
- Member of the jury at Roshd International Film Festival, Iran, 2012
- Member of the jury at Golden Apricot International Film Festival, Armenia, 2015
- Member of the jury at All Lights India International Film Festival, Kerala, India, 2015
- Member of the jury in the Indian Panorama's feature film section, International Film Festival of India, India, 2015
- Chairperson of the jury at Goa State Film Festival Awards, Goa, India, 2016
- Member of the jury in the Indian competition section, Bengaluru International Film Festival, Karnataka, India, 2017
- Jury Chairperson of the Heritage Short Films section, Guwahati International Film Festival, Assam, 2017
- Member of the selection committee for the Indian Oscar entry, India, 2017
- Member of the jury at Dhaka International Film Festival, Bangladesh, 2018
- Member of the jury at Aswan International Women's Film Festival, Egypt, 2018
- Member of the jury at the 1st Rain International Nature Film Festival, Kerala, 2019
- Member of the jury in International Competition, Kolkata International Film Festival, West Bengal, 2019
- Member of the jury in International Competition, 6th Herat International Women's Film Festival, Afghanistan, 2020
- Member of the jury in the Central Panel, 67th National Film Awards, India, 2021
- Member of the jury in International Competition, Rome Independent Film Festival, Italy, 2021
- Member of the jury at the Rain International Nature Film Festival, Kerala, 2022
- Member of the jury in International Competition, Tallinn Black Nights Film Festival, Estonia, 2022
- Member of the jury at the Rain International Nature Film Festival, Kerala 2023
- Member of jury in Indian Panorama in Bengaluru International Film Festival, Karnataka, 2024
- Member of the jury in International Competition at Fajr International Film Festival, Iran, 2025
