= Sisir Mishra =

Indian film director and screenwriter

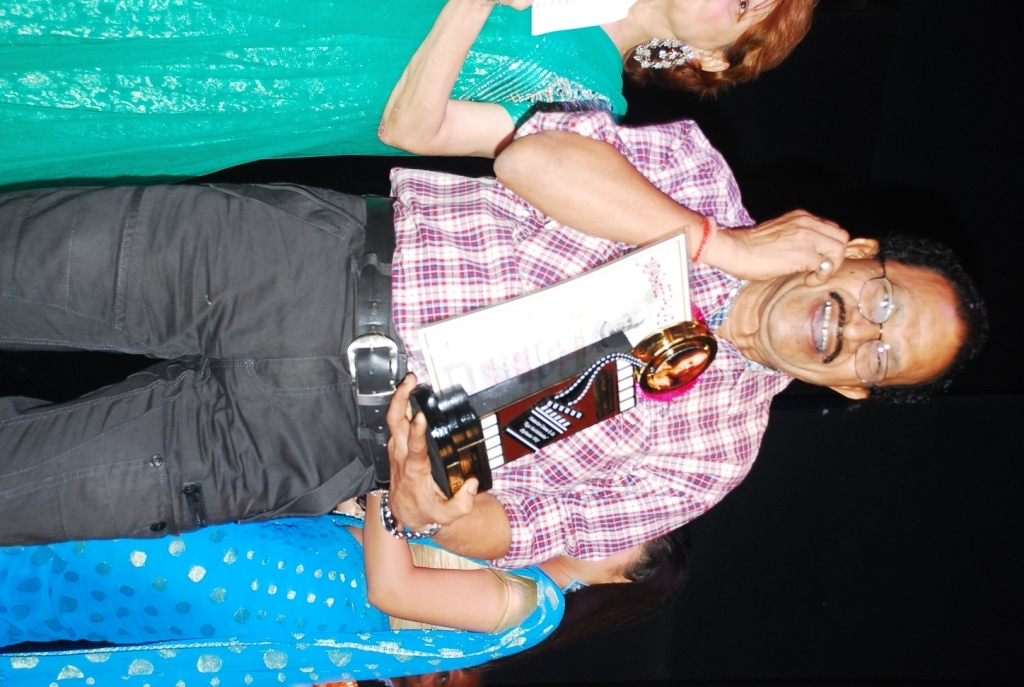
- Born: Odisha, India
- Education: Ravenshaw College
- Occupations: Film director; screenwriter
- Spouse: Kadambini Mishra
- Honours: Padma Shri

Sisir Mishra is an Indian film director and screenwriter best known for directing Hindi and Odia language films including Bheegi Palkein, Samay Ki Dhara, Billoo Baadshaah, TADA and Aseema.

In 2018 he was awarded the Padma Shri, India's fourth-highest civilian award.

== Biography ==
He was born in Bomkei, near Digapahandi in the Ganjam district of Odisha. His father Purushottam Mishra, was an engineer who worked for the British Raj. Mishra completed his B.Sc degree from Khallikote College, Brahmapur and an M.Sc. in Physics from Ravenshaw College, Cuttack.

In 1965, Mishra left his academic career as a physics lecturer, moved to Mumbai and started his film career as an assistant director under Mehboob Khan (director of Mother India) and Jyoti Swaroop (director of Padosan).

Mishra went on to direct many box office hit films in the Odia language such as Sindura Bindu, Suna Sansaara, Subarna Seeta, Samaya Bada Balawaan, Ei Ama Sansaara, Bastra Harana, Suna Bhauja, Sabata Maa and others. In addition, he directed several Hindi films.

== Filmography ==
- Bheegi Palkein (1982)
- Samay Ki Dhara
- Billoo Baadshaah
- TADA
- Aseema
- Sindura Bindu (1976)
- Suna Sansaara(1978)
- Subarna Seeta(1983)
- Samaya Bada Balawaan(1982)
- Ei Ama Sansaara(1986)
- Bastra Harana
- Suna Bhauja
- Sabata Maa

== Awards ==
Popularly known as the Dronacharya of Oriya Cinema, Sisir Mishra pioneered modern film making in Oriya cinema. He won many awards. Following are some of his prestigious awards:

- 2012 Oriya Cinema Gourav (Show Time 2012 Film Awards) Pride of Odisha, March 18, 2012
- 2012 Chalachitra Jagat Pratibha Samman – 2011, Jan 8, 2012
- 2006: Jayadeba Puraskar (Odisha Government), for Lifetime Achievement in Oriya Cinema.
- 2004: Nitai Palit Award (Most Prestigious Award given by Professionals of Oriya cinema)
- 2018: Padma Shri

== Family ==
Mishra is married to Kadambini Mishra, who has also acted as co-scriptwriter for a number of his films. He has two sons, Sagar and Sameer.
