= Kishori Devi =

Nepalese politician

Honourable Kishori Devi
- किशोरी देवी

Madhesh Provincial Assembly member
- Incumbent
- Assumed office 2022
- Preceded by: N/A
- Constituency: Party list

Personal details
- Party: CPN (Unified Socialist)
- Occupation: Politician

Kishori Devi (Nepali: किशोरी देवी) is a Nepalese politician and a member of Provincial Assembly of Madhesh Province from CPN (Unified Socialist). She was elected via 2022 Nepalese provincial elections from CPN (Unified Socialist) party list.
