= Sabyasachi Mohapatra =

Indian film director, writer, and producer

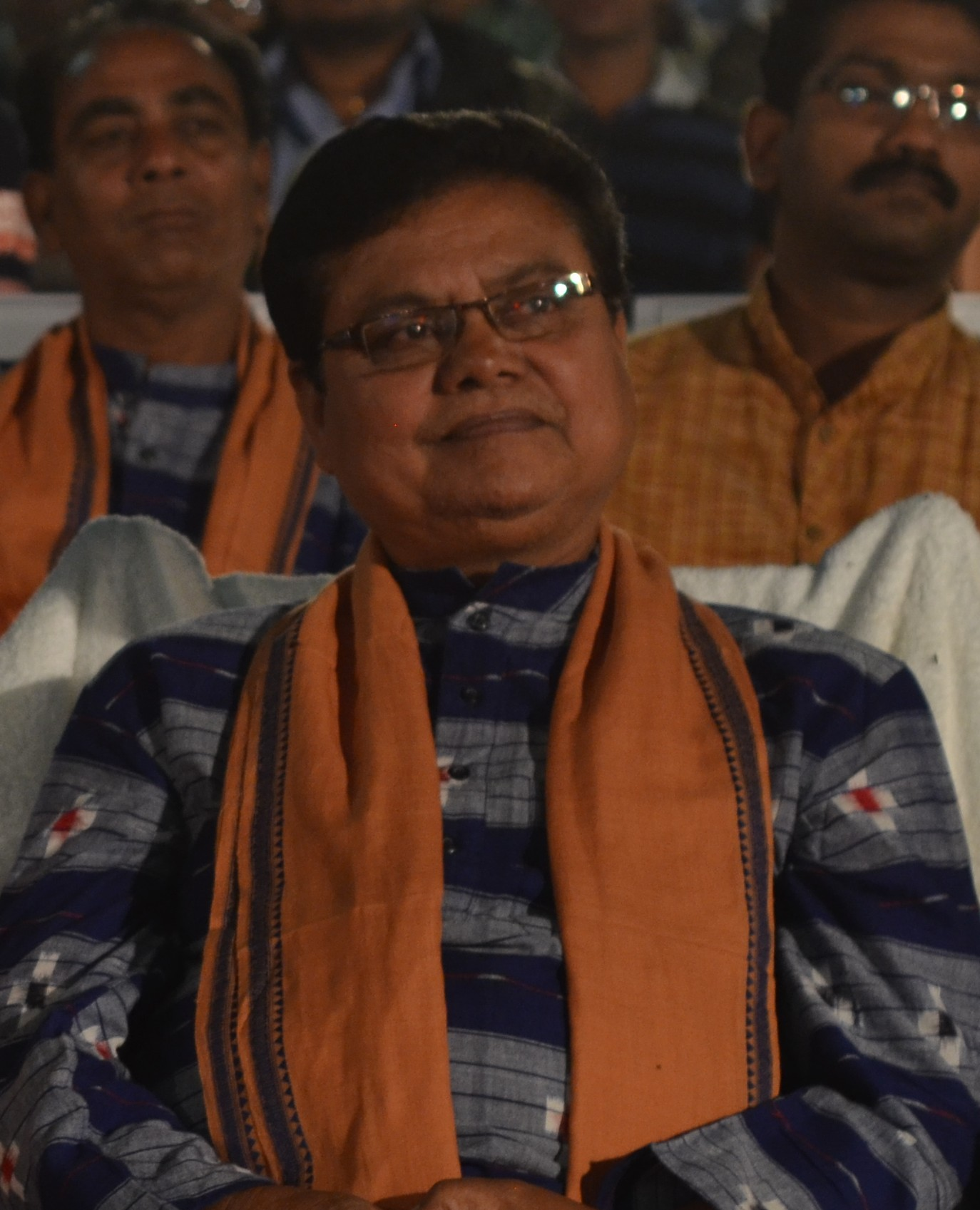
- Mohapatra during Odisha State Film Awards ceremony 2014, Utkal Mandap, Bhubaneswar
- Born: 27 August 1950 (age 75); Lehedi, Orissa, India
- Occupations: Director, Producer, Screenwriter
- Years active: 1974-now
- Children: Kumar C Dev Mohapatra (son) Madhubala Mohapatra Rajashree Mohapatra
- Parent(s): Kapileswar Prasad Mohapatra (father); Bishnupriya Mohapatra (mother)

Sabyasachi Mohapatra (born 27 August 1950 in Lehedi, India) is an Indian film director, writer, and producer in Odia cinema. He owns a production house named Mohapatra Movie Magic.

== Career ==
Mohapatra made his directorial debut in film Bhukha in Sambalpuri Language that won International Jury award at Gijon Film festival in Spain.

His movie Jai Jagannatha released in 2006, a mythological film, was a mega-budget released in 15 different Indian languages.

After 25 years, director Sabyasachi Mohapatra is back with Sala Budha in 2012. The film is based on a novel by renowned author Kapilesh Prasad Mohapatra (his father), the film was screened at the International Film Festival of in Goa, India in 2013 and the film won seven awards, including the best actor award, at the Odisha state film awards.

He directed another Sambalpuri language film Aadim Vichar released in 2014 and the film won 62nd National Film Awards in Best Feature Film in Odia and also won Best director and Best actor award at 26th Odisha State Film Awards.

In 2015, he worked on his next project 'Pahada Ra Luha' and which earned him back-to-back National Film Awards. The film won Best Feature Film in Odia at 63rd National Film Awards in 2015.

== Filmography ==
Year	Film	Director	Producer	Screenwriter	Language	Notes	Ref
1987	Sabu Mayare Baya	Yes		Yes	Odia	Debut Film as Director	
1989	Bhukha	Yes	Yes	Yes	Sambalpuri	This is the first Oriya film to get an International Jury Award at the Gijón International Film Festival	
1996	Jhili	Yes		Yes	Odia		
1998	Bou	Yes	Yes	Yes	Odia	Won 1998 Orissa State Film Awards in five Categories including Best Film	
2003	Bahudibe Mo Jaga Balia	Yes		Yes	Odia		
2007	Jai Jagannatha	Yes		Yes	Odia	First Odia film to be dubbed in 15 different Languages	
2013	Sala Budha	Yes		Yes	Sambalpuri	Won 7 Categories at 25th Odisha State Film Awards 2015 including Best Film	
2014	Aadim Vichar	Yes		Yes	Sambalpuri	Won 62nd National Film Awards for Best Feature Film in Odia	
2016	Pahada Ra Luha	Yes		Yes	Sambalpuri	Won 63rd National Film Awards for Best Feature Film in Odia	
2020	Sala Budhar Badla	Yes			Sambalpuri	Third movie in the Sala Budha movie series	
2025	Anantaa	Yes	Yes		Odia	based on novel Randi Pua Anantaa by Fakir Mohan Senapati	

== Awards ==
- Ganakabi Samman awarded by Ganakabi Baishnab Pani Jayanti Committee in 2017.
- International Jury award
- Odisha Living Legend Award
- Sambhabana Oriya cinema award
