= Tulasi Munda =

Indian activist and educator

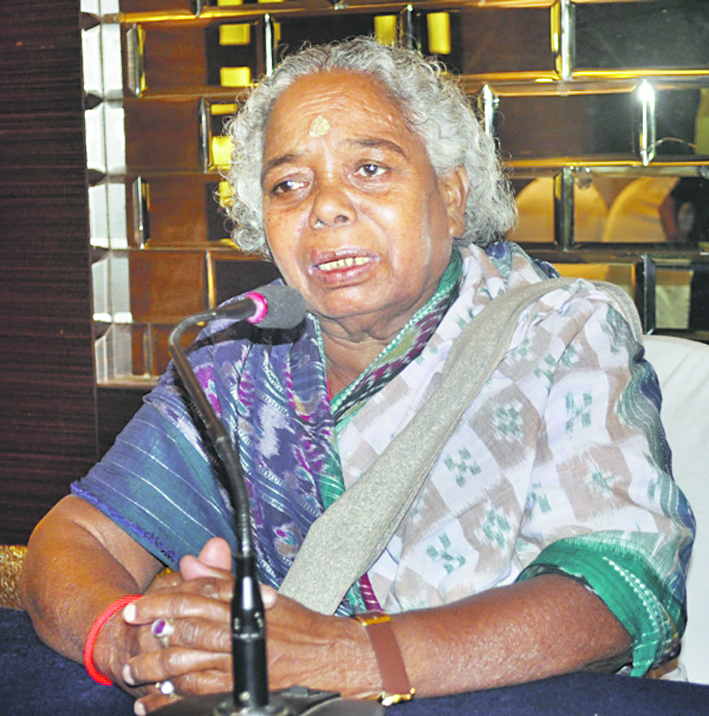
- Munda in 2011
- Born: 15 July 1947 (age 79); Kainshi, Keonjhar, present-day Odisha (erstwhile British India)
- Other name: Tulasi Apa
- Occupations: Educator, social activist
- Known for: Contribution to education among adivasis (indigenous populations)
- Awards: Padma Shri (2001)

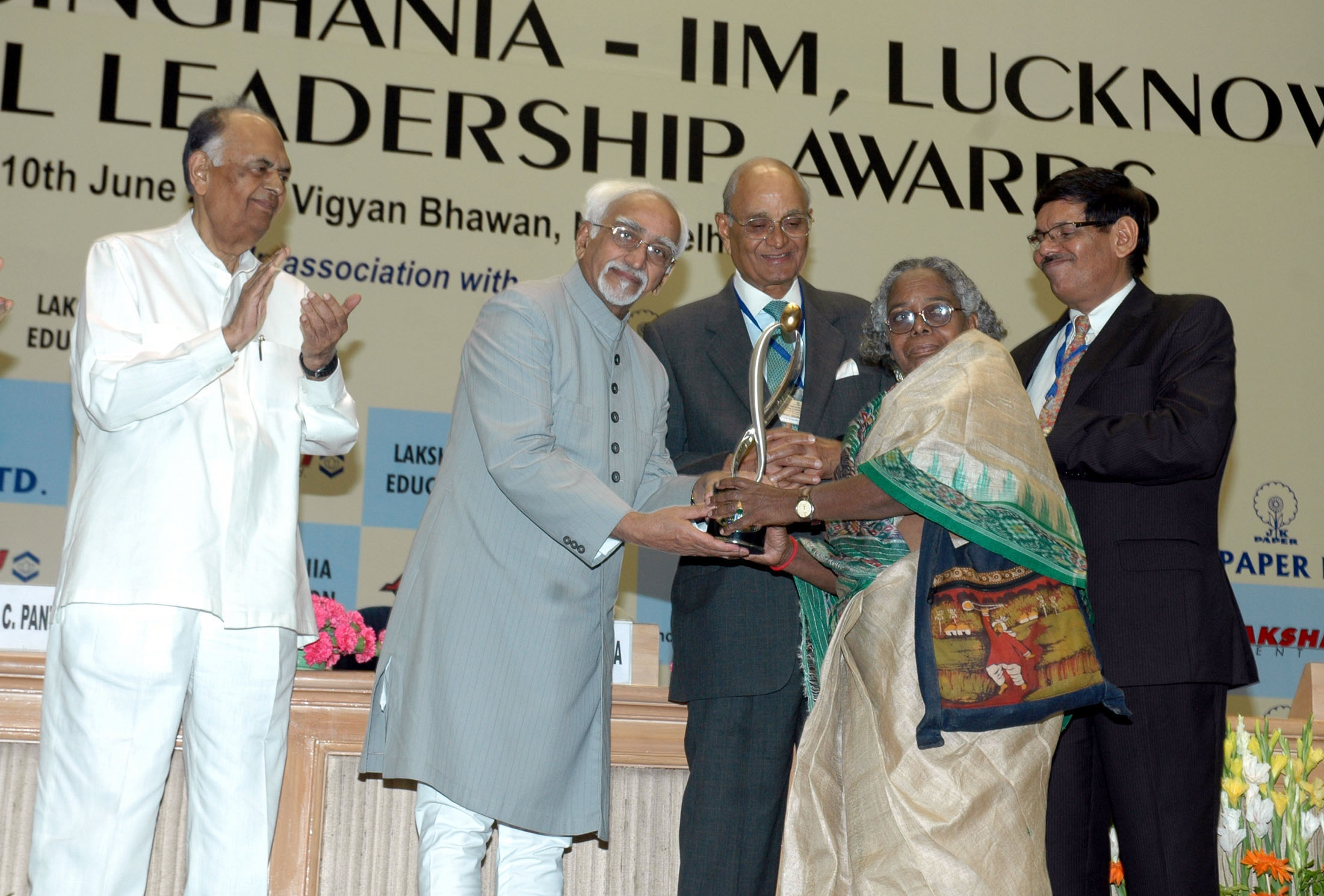
Tulasi Munda receiving Lakshmipat Singhania-IIM Lucknow National Leadership Award, 10 June 2009

Tulasi Munda (born 15 July 1947) is a social activist from the Indian state of Odisha. She was awarded the Padma Shri in 2001 by Government of India for her contribution to spreading literacy among the impoverished adivasi peoples of Odisha. Munda started an informal school in 1964 in Odisha's iron ore mining area to educate children from local adivasi populations, who would otherwise have ended up as child labour in the mines. She had been a child labourer in the mines of Keonjhar herself.

Munda is illiterate and has no formal education. She belongs to the Ho ethnic group of adivasis, the collective term in mainland South Asia for indigenous peoples.

She is popularly known as "Tulasi Apa", literally meaning "Sister Tulasi" in Odia.

== Early life ==
Munda was born on 15 July 1947 in Kainshi village located in the present-day Keonjhar district in Odisha. Keonjhar is one of the most economically underdeveloped districts in Odisha. As a child, she wished to study but the idea of educating girls and women was largely socially unacceptable at the time. Child labour, poverty and slavery prevented indigenous children from getting an education. When she was 12, she went to Serenda village to live with her sister. There she worked in the mines.

== Activism ==
In 1961, Munda met social reformers Ramadevi Choudhury, Nirmala Deshpande and Malati Choudhury who advocated for education for women. She joined their efforts happening in different parts of the country. Munda also met Acharya Vinoba Bhave when he visited Odisha in 1963 during the Bhoodan movement. Her social service training and the guidance of social reformers inspired her future efforts.

She returned to Serenda in 1964 and started an informal school for children in the veranda of her home. Later, she started the "Adivasi Vikas Samiti School". As of 2019, the school provides education up to the 10th standard for nearly 500 boy and girl students every year. The school has increased the level of education and standard of living in the area. Since 1964, she has educated more than 20,000 children and helped the government establish 17 schools for primary or secondary education.

== Awards ==
- Padma Shri, the fourth highest civilian award given by the Government of India, in 2001, for her contribution to the field of "social work".
- Kadambini Samman, 2008.
- Odisha Living Legend Award for Excellence in Social Service, 2011.
- Lakshmipat Singhania - IIM Lucknow National Leadership Award, in the category of Community Service and Social Upliftment (Leader), 2009.

== Biopic ==
Tulasi Apa, a biographic film based on her based on her life was released in 2015 at the Kolkata Film Festival, where it received critical acclaim. The film was also screened at the 4th edition of the Tehran Jasmine International Film Festival (TJIFF) on 30 October 2016.
