= List of Odia-language films =

This is a list of films produced in Cinema of Odisha in the Odia language.

== 1936–1959 ==
- List of Ollywood films of 1936
- List of Ollywood films of 1949
- List of Ollywood films of 1950
- List of Ollywood films of 1951
- List of Ollywood films of 1953
- List of Ollywood films of 1954
- List of Ollywood films of 1956
- List of Ollywood films of 1959

== 1960s ==
- List of Ollywood films of 1960
- List of Ollywood films of 1961
- List of Ollywood films of 1962
- List of Ollywood films of 1963
- List of Ollywood films of 1964
- List of Ollywood films of 1965
- List of Ollywood films of 1966
- List of Ollywood films of 1967
- List of Ollywood films of 1968
- List of Ollywood films of 1969

== 1970s ==
- List of Ollywood films of 1970
- List of Ollywood films of 1971
- List of Ollywood films of 1972
- List of Ollywood films of 1973
- List of Ollywood films of 1974
- List of Ollywood films of 1975
- List of Ollywood films of 1976
- List of Ollywood films of 1977
- List of Ollywood films of 1978
- List of Ollywood films of 1979

== 1980s ==
- List of Ollywood films of 1980
- List of Ollywood films of 1981
- List of Ollywood films of 1982
- List of Ollywood films of 1983
- List of Ollywood films of 1984
- List of Ollywood films of 1985
- List of Ollywood films of 1986
- List of Ollywood films of 1987
- List of Ollywood films of 1988
- List of Ollywood films of 1989

== 1990s ==
- List of Ollywood films of 1990
- List of Ollywood films of 1991
- List of Ollywood films of 1992
- List of Ollywood films of 1993
- List of Ollywood films of 1994
- List of Ollywood films of 1995
- List of Ollywood films of 1996
- List of Ollywood films of 1997
- List of Ollywood films of 1998
- List of Ollywood films of 1999

== 2000s ==
- List of Ollywood films of 2000
- List of Ollywood films of 2001
- List of Ollywood films of 2002
- List of Ollywood films of 2003
- List of Ollywood films of 2004
- List of Ollywood films of 2005
- List of Ollywood films of 2006
- List of Ollywood films of 2007
- List of Ollywood films of 2008
- List of Ollywood films of 2009

== 2010s ==
- List of Odia films of 2010
- List of Odia films of 2011
- List of Odia films of 2012
- List of Odia films of 2013
- List of Odia films of 2014
- List of Odia films of 2015
- List of Odia films of 2016
- List of Odia films of 2017
- List of Odia films of 2018
- List of Odia films of 2019

== 2020s ==
- List of Odia films of 2020
- List of Odia films of 2021
- List of Odia films of 2022
- List of Odia films of 2023
- List of Odia films of 2024
- List of Odia films of 2025
