= List of Odia films of the 1990s =

A list of films produced by the Ollywood film industry based in Bhubaneswar and Cuttack in the 1990s. Ollywood celebrated its 70 years of existence in 2012.

Title	Director	Cast	Genre	Notes
1990
Agnee Beena	Manmohan Mahapatra	Hemanta Das, Bijay Samal, Pushpa Panda		
Kandhei	Prashanta Nanda	Prashanta Nanda, Shriram Panda, Mahasweta Roy		
Ama Ghara	Ravi Kinnagi			
Hasa Luha Bhara Dunia	Pranaba Das	,		
Prem Bandhan	Gopal Krishna	Mihir Das		
Kalia Bharasa	Sidhartha			
Maa Mangala		Naina Das		
Chakadola Karuchi Leela	Para Patnaik	Uttam Mohanty, Aparajita Mohanty		
Maa Mate Shakti De	Samsan Lima	,		
Daiba Daudi	Hara Patnaik			
Paradeshi Chadhei	Ravi Kinnagi	Uttam Mohanty, Aarminta		
Thakura Achanti Chau Bahaku	Bijay Bhaskar			
Aee Sangharsa	Rajani Kant	Bijay Mohanty, Dipti Naval		
1991
Adi Mimansa	A. K. Bir	Mohan Gokhale, Neena Gupta, Lalatendu Ratha		A. K. Bir got best Cinematography award in National Film award 1991
Doora Diganta	Kumar Misra			
Kapala Likhana	Hara Patnaik			
Kotia Manish Gotiye Jaga	Bijaya Bhaskar	Bijay Mohanty		
Bhabantaran	Kumar Sahani	Kelucharan Mohapatra		
Bastra Haran	Sisir Misra	Sriram Panda, Mahasweta Roy		
Ki Heba Sua Posile	Basant Sahu	Siddhanta Mahapatra, Arura		
Loot Taraj	Prashanta Nanda	Prashanta Nanda,		
Para Jhia Ghara Bhangena				
Aam Ghara Aam Sansara		Bijay Mohanty		
To Binu Anya Gati Nahin	Mahmad Mahsin	Uttam Mohanty, Aparajita Mohanty		
1992
Badshah	Prasenjit Chatterjee			
Ghara Mora Swarga	Aruna Mohanty	Sriram Panda, Mahasweta Roy, Mihir Das, Bijay Mohanty		
Paradesi Chadhei	Rabi Kinnagi	Uttam Mohanty, Mihir Das, Angelaa Chriss		
Maa Jhara Saha	Kanhu Mohanty	,		
Hisaba kariba Kalia	Sumanta Dey			
Dadagiri	Rakesh Mohanty	Uttam Mohanty, Aparajita Mohanty		
Agni Sankat	Santunu Misra			
Anti Churi Tanti Kate	Basant Sahu			
Mukti Tirtha	Himanshu Das			
Maa	Prashanta Nanda	Shrikant, Ritu Das, Rakhi Guljar		
Naga Panchami	Bijay Bhaskar	Uttam Mohanty, Prasanjeet, Rutupurna Ghosh, Debashree Roy		
Panjur Bhitare Sari	Avtar Singh			
Preeti Ra Iti	Raghu Misra			
Sukha Sansara	Biresh Chatterji			
Tara	Bijaya Jena	Bijaya Jena, Sunil Chourasia, Ajit Das		National Award for Best Odia Film(92)
Udandi Sita	Avatar Singh			
Bhinna Samaya	Man Mohan Mahapatra			
1993
Indradhanura Chhai	Sushant Misra	Surya Mohanty, Sonia Mahapatra, Robin Das	Drama	Susanta Mishra won Grand Prix in the year 1995for the film.
Asha	Shantunu Misra	Asrumochan MohantyAparajita Mohanty		
Shardhanjali	Pankaja Pani	Siddhanta Mahapatra, Lekha Nanda		
Bhagya Hate Doro	Hara Patnaik	Uttam Mohanty, Bijay Mohanty, Rekha Jain		
Ghara Sansara	Prashant Nanda	Prasenjit Chatterjee, Satabdi Roy		
Aranya Rodan	Biplaba Roy Choudhary	Priyambda Roy, Sarat Pujari, Raicharan		
Pathara Khasuchi Bada Deulu	Raju Misra	Sirkant Gautam, Shrishtee		
Byabhichara	Raghu Misra	Bijay Mohanty, Nari		
1994
Akuha Katha	Tarun Majumdar	Uttam Mohanty, Mahashweta roy		
Lubeidak	P. L. Das	Hanu Dulari, Satya Mishra, Premalata Das		
Mahua	Haish Mohanty	Sriram Panda, Singdha Mohanty		
Bhai Hela Bhagari	Ravi Kinnagi	Sidhanta Mahapatra, Rachna Banerjee		
Gadhi Janile Ghara Sundara	Basant Sahu	Uttam Mohanty, Aparajita Mohanty,		
Mukti Mashal	Shantunu Misra	Mihir Das, Aparajita Mohanty		
Naga Jyoti	Ram Narayan	Uttam Mohanty, Satabdi Roy, Anushree Das		
Nirbachana	Biplab Roy Choudhary	Bhim Singh, Bidyut Prava Patnaik, Sangeeta Dutta		
Pacheri Uthila Majhi Duaru	Bijay Bhaskar	Uttam Mohanty, Anita Das		
Rakhile Siba Mariba Kie	Binoda Nanda	Upasana Singh, Uttam Mohanty		
Suna Bhauja	Sisir Misra	Aparajita Mohanty, Jairam Samal		
Lavanya Preeti	A K Bir	Tara Shankar Misra		Tara Shankar Misra got best child artist award in National Film award 1994
1995
Mo Bhai Jaga	P. V. Sarathi,	Nihar Samal, Puja Mishra		
Subhadra	Prabhakar	Siddhanta Mahapatra, Mihir Das, Rachna Banerji		
Kula Nandan	Himanshu Parija	Siddhanta Mahapatra, Rachna Banerji		
Mo Mana Khali Tumari Pain	Shantunu Misra	Siddhanta Mahapatra, Bijay Mohanty		
Suna Panjuri	Ravi Kinnagi	Siddhanta Mahapatra, Indira Krishnan		
Rana Bhumi	Pranab Das	Siddhanta Mahapatra, Roopa Gangooly		
Mani Nageswari	Bijay Bhaskar	Siddhanta Mahapatra,		
1996
Jhili	Sabyasachi Mahapatra	Soumen Pujari, Swati Ray		
Manara Murchana	Shantunu Misra	Swati Ray		
Jashoda	Hara Patnaik	Siddhanta Mahapatra, Rachana Banerjee		
Shunya Swaroopa	Himanshu Khatua	Ch. Bikash Das, Surya Mohanty Ch. Jaya prakash Das Aparajita Mohanty		The film won National Award in 1997. 5 State Film Awards including Best Feature Film, Best Director, Best Cinematography, Best Music, Best Art Direction, participated in Rotterdam International Film Festival(Netherlands) 1997, Goteberg International Film Festival 1997 (Sweden), Sochi International Film Festival (Russia), Cinemajove International Film Festival (Spain)...
Nila Masterani	Chakradhara Sahu	Minaketan, Priyanka		In the year 1997, Nila Masterani had received State Film awards, in five categories. Those are for Special jury, best editing, best sound recording, best story, and best actor.
Mokshya	Malati Roy, Gauri Shankar Das	Pushpa Panda		
Pua Moro Bhola Shankara	Hara Patnaik	Uttam Mohanty, Aparajita Mohanty, Siddhanta Mahapatra, Priyanka		
Sakal Tirtha	Sangrama Biswal	Uttam Mohanty, Aparajita Mohanty		
Sindura Nuhe Khela Ghara	Rabi Kinagi	Siddhanta Mahapatra, Rachana Banerjee		
Laxman Rekha	Mohamadd Mohsin	Siddhanta Mahapatra, Rachana Banerjee		
Sakhi Rakhiba Mo Shankha Sindura	Arun Mohanty	Siddhanta Mahapatra,		
Suna Pua	Bijay Bhaskar	Tapas Paul, Aparajita Mohanty		
Mo Kola To Jhulana	Himanshu Parija	Siddhanta Mahapatra'Rachana Banerjee		
Vasudha	Avatar Singh	Aparajita Mohanty, Mihir Das		
Suhaga Sindura	Hara Patnaik	Siddhanta Mahapatra, Rachana Banerjee		
1997
Shesha Drushti	A. K. Bir	Sarat Pujari, Narendra Mohanty, Neelam Mukherjee		National Award for Best Film in Oriya language
Sahara Jaluchi	Sudhansu Sahu	Siddhanta Mahapatra, Mihir Das, Mithun Chakraborty, Uttam Mohanty		
Ganga Jamuna	Hara Patnaik	Siddhanta Mahapatra, Rachana Banerjee, Mihir Das		
Asuchi Mo Kalia Raja	Surya Misra	Siddhanta Mahapatra Mohini Shilapi		
Ram Laxman	Sangam Biswal	Bijay Mohanty, Tandra Roy		
Savitree	Jitendra Mohapatra	Sritam Das		
Pua Mora Jagata Jita	Sanak Devata	Siddhanta MahapatraAnu Chowdhury, Bijay Mohanty		
Lakhe Siba Puji Paichi Pua	Mohamadd Mohsin	Siddhanta Mahapatra, Rachana Banerjee		
Nari Bi Pindhipare Rakta Sindura	Hara Patnaik	Siddhanta Mahapatra, Rachana Banerjee		
1998
Suna Palinki	Surya Misra	Siddhanta Mahapatra, Gayatri Jariwala, Rachana Banerjee, Sagar Misra		
Nandan	A. K. Bir	Soubhagya Chandan Satapathy		
Stree	Rabi Kinnagi	Ajit Das, Mihir Das, Archana Joglekar		
Eei Sangharsha	Arun Mohanty	Siddhanta Mahapatra, Deepti Naval		
Santana	Mohamadd Mohsin	Siddhanta Mahapatra, Rachana Banerjee		
1999
Biswaprakash	Susant Misra	Sanjeev Samal, Nandita Das	Social	Participated in Shanghai International Film Festival(1999) and Cairo International Film festival(1999).
Maa Goja Bayani	Basant Sahu	Anu Chowdhury, Priyambada Roy		
Krushna Kaberi	Prashant Nanda	Rubi Nanda, Mihir Das, Hara Patnaik		
Jai Sriram	Trupti Biswal	Antara Biswas, Siddhanta Mahapatra, Mihir Das		
Katha Kahiba Mo Matha Sindur	Arun Mohanty	Siddhanta Mahapatra, Aparajita Mohanty, Nikita		
Nari Akhire Nian	Sanjay Nayak	Siddhanta Mahapatra, Anu Chowdhury, Deepa Sahu, Mihir Das		
Pua Bhangi Dela Suna Sansara	Basant Sahu	Moumita Gupta, Siddhanta Mahapatra		
Ei Akhi Ama Sakhi	Arabinda Pandey	Sirkant Gautam, Sasmita Pradhan		
Paradesi Babu	Hara Patnaik	Siddhanta Mahapatra, Rachna Banerji, Sathi		
Tulasi	Pankaj Pani	Siddhanta Mahapatra, Aparajita Mohanty		
