= List of Odia films of 2007 =

This is a list of films produced by the Ollywood film industry based in Bhubaneshwar and Cuttack in 2007:

== A-Z ==
Title	Director	Cast	Genre	Notes
2007
Chaka Chaka Bhaurin	Subhendu Swain	Siddhanta Mahapatra, Mihir Das, Kajol Mishra		
Dhauli Express	Chitta Ranjan Tripathi	Siddhanta Mahapatra, Samaresh, Anu Choudhary, Kajal		
E Mana Manena	N. Padhi	Arindam, Mihir Das, Kajal, Barsha, Dushmant		
Jai Jagannatha	Sabyasachi Mahapatra	Sadhu Meher, Jyoti Misra, Sritam Das, Sarat Pujari		
Kathantara	Himanshu Khatua	Anu Choudhary, Bhaswati Basu, Rasesh Mohanty, Mamuni Mishra		Best Oriya Film-44th National Film Festival, India; 8 state film awards
Kalishankar	Prashanta Nanda, Basanta Sahu	Siddhanta Mahapatra, Anubhav Mohanty, Arindam roy, Anu Chowdhury, Ashish Vidyarthi		
Lakhmi Pratima	Mohammad Mohsin	Siddhanta Mahapatra, Rachana Banerjee, Sritam Das		
Lal Tuku Tuku Sadhaba Bahu	Sangram Biswal	Arindam Roy, Anu Chowdhury		
Mahanayak	Debu Patnaik	Anubhav Mohanty, Koel Mallick, Rahul Dev		Remake of Telugu movie Ranam
Mo Suna Pua	Jyotiprakash Das	Mahashweta Roy, Samaresh RoutrayJyoti Mishra		
Monika O My Darling	Nilamani Sahu	Rabi Misra, Mamuni Misra, Hari		
Mu Tate Love Karuchi	Ashok Pati	Siddhanta Mahapatra, Mihir Das, Arindam, Bijay Mohanty, Uttam Mohanty, Namrata Thapa, Mamuni Misra		
Nari Nuhen Tu Narayani	Himanshu Parija	Siddhanta Mahapatra, Diptirekha Panda, Rachana Banerjee		
Pagala Premi	Hara Patnaik	Sabyasachi Mishra, Arpita, Saroj Das, Debjani		Remake of Telugu movie Arya
Pheria Mo Suna Bhauni	Ranjita Mohanty	Mihir Das, Jina		
Puja Pain Phulatie	Gadadhar Puttty	Sarat Pujari, Adyasha Mohapatra, Naina Das		State Film Award(Best child artist)-Adyasha Mohapatra; Best Oriya film in 54th National film award
Samaya Hathare Dori	Amulya Das	Siddhanta Mahapatra, Anu choudhary, Mihir Das, Meghna Misra		
Rasika Nagar	Dilipa Panda	Siddhanta Mahapatra, Namrata Thapa		Remake of 2004 Tamil movie Perazhagan
To Bina Mo Kahani Adha	Sanjay Nayak	Anubhav Mohanty, Archita, Ajit Das, Anita Das, Rai Mohan, Debajani, Jai		
To Pain Nebi Mu Sahe Janama	Sanjay Nayak & Malay Misra	Archita Sahu		The Best Actress Award to Archita in 2007
Tumaku Paruni Ta Bhuli	Chakradhar Sahu	Manoj Misra, Sunil Kumar, Anu Chowdhury, Amelie Panda		
