= List of Odia films of 2010 =

This is a list of films produced by the Oriya film industry based in Bhubaneshwar and Cuttack in 2010:

== A-Z ==
Title	Director	Cast	Genre	Notes
2010
Aakhi Palakare Tu	Rabindra Pradhan	Sabyasachi Mishra, Babli, Mukesh Rishi, Harihara Mahapatra		
Aalo Mora Kandhei	Himanshu Parija	Akash Das Nayak, Siddhanta Mahapatra, Archita Sahu, Priya, Anita Das, Mihir Das		
Aama Bhitare Kichhi Achhi	Sushant Mani	Anubhav Mohanty, Shriya Jha, Gloria Mohanty, Ajit Das, Anita Das, Barsa Priyadarshini	Producer-Sarthak Music	
Ae Milana Juga Jugara	Ashok Kumar	Rajdeep, Elle, Pushpa Panda, Chandan Kar, Minaketan, Nupura Ghosh		
Anjali	Biswa Bhusan Mohapatra	Aditya, Sampurna Chakraborty, Deabasmitha, Raj		
Asibu Kebe Saji Mo Rani	Manaranjan Pal	Akash Das Nayak, Khushi Garvi, Raimohan, Mihir Das		
Bhul Bujhibani Mate	Kunal Patnaik	Debasis, Amelie Panda, Pintu Nanda, Aparajita Mohanty, Mihir Das, Ajit Das		
Dil Tate Deichi	Sanjay Nayak	Sabyasachi Misra, Priya, Mihir Das, Harihara Mahapatra		Remake of Tamil film Deepavali
Diwana	Ashok Pati	Barsa Priyadarshini, Anubhav Mohanty, Samaresh, Bijay Mohanty, Pintu Nanda, Mihir Das		Remake of 2008 Tamil movie Kadhalil Vizhunthen
Don	Sudhanshu Sahu	Siddhanta Mahapatra, Anubhav Mohanty, Aurosmitha, Bijay Mohanty, Uttam Mohanty, Anita Das		Remake of Telugu movie Don, starring NagarjunaAsst. Director : Tripati Kumar Sahu
Megha Sabari Re Asiba Pheri	Sanjay Nayak	Sabyasachi Misra, Priya, Minaketan, Bijay Mohanty, Kuna Tripathy, Akhila		Remake of Telugu film Magaadheera
Mu Kana Ete Kharap	Basant Sahu	Anubhav Mohanty, Arpita Mukherjee, Mihir Das, Bijay Mohanty, Minaketan, Satyaki Misra		Remake of 2008 Telugu movie Baladur, starring Ravi Teja and Anushka Shetty
Om Namaha Shivaya	Rabindra Pradhan	Bablu, Rali Nanda, Anita Das, Bijay Mohanty		
Pahili Raja	Tapas Sargharia	Siddhanta Mahapatra, Anu Chowdhury, Debasis, Mihir Das, Minaketan, Jairam Samala		
Prema Adhei Akhyara	Sudhakar Basanta	Babushaan Mohanty, Riya Dey, Mihir Das, Bijay Mohanty, Harihara Mahapatra, Samaresh		Remake of 2007 Telugu movie Adavari Matalaku Ardhalu Verule, starring Venktesh and Trisha
Sanju Aau Sanjana	Ashok Pati	Babushaan Mohanty, Parijaat, Mihir Das, Usasi Misra, Pintu Nanda, Samaresh, Uttam Mohanty		Remake of Telugu movie Parugu, starring Allu Arjun
Sasura Ghara Zindabad	Sanjay Nayak	Sabyasachi Misra, Megha Ghosh, Pushpa Panda, Bijay Mohanty, Hadu, Arabinda		
Subha Vivaha	Jyotiprakash Das	Akash Das Nayak, Barsa Priyadarshini, Pupinder Singh, Aparajita Mohanty, Jairam Samal, Tandra Roy		
Swayamsiddha	Sudhanshu Sahu	Siddhanta Mahapatra, Sunil Kumar, Yukta, Aparajita Mohanty, Anita Das, Pradyumna Lenka		Associate Director: Tripati Sahu
Tate Bhala Pauchi Boli	Prashant Kumar	Bobby Mishra, Koel Mukherjee, Aparajita Mohanty, Mihir Das, Jairam Samal, Kuna Tripathy		
To Akhire Mun	S.K. Muralidharan	Babushaan Mohanty, Sweety, Namrta Das, Uttam Mohanty, Aparajita MohantyHara Patnaik		Remake of Tamil film Maasilamani
Tora More Jodi Sundara	Debu Pattnaik	Sabyasachi Misra, Arpita Mukherjee, Archita Sahu, Bijay Mohanty, Mihir Das, Pintu Nanda		
Tu Tha Mu Jauchhu Rusi	Sreetam	Arindam, Koil		
Tu Thile Mo Dara Kahaku	Dilip Panda	Mahashweta Roy, Budhaditya, Rali Nanda, Barsa Priyadarshini, Bijay Mohanty, Raimohan		
