= List of Odia films of 1992 =

This is a list of films produced by the Ollywood film industry based in Bhubaneshwar and Cuttack in 1992:

== A-Z ==
Title	Director	Cast	Genre	Notes
1992
Agni Sankat	Santunu Misra			
Anti Churi Tanti Kate	Basant Sahu	Bijay Mohanty, Hara Patnaik, Dukhiram Swain, Jayiram Samal		
Aranya Rodan	Biplaba Roy Choudhary	Priyambda Roy, Sarat Pujari, Raicharan		
Badshah	Prasenjit Chatterjee			
Bhinna Samaya	Man Mohan Mahapatra			
Ghara Mora Swarga	Aruna Mohanty	Sriram Panda, Mahasweta Roy, Mihir Das, Bijay Mohanty		
Maa	Prashanta Nanda	Shrikant, Ritu Das, Rakhi Guljar		
Maa Jahara Saha	Kanhu Mohanty	Uttam Mohanty, Aparajita Mohanty, Mihir Das, Jayiram Samal, Dukhiram Swain		
Mukti Tirtha	Himanshu Das			
Naga Panchami	Bijay Bhaskar	Uttam Mohanty, Prasanjeet, Rutupurna Ghosh, Debashree Roy		
Panjur Bhitare Sari	Avtar Singh	Bijay Mohanty, Mihir Das, Tandra Ray, Aparajita Mohanty		Remake of Hindi film Choti Bohu
Preeti Ra Iti	Raghu Misra			
Sukha Sansara	Biresh Chatterji			
Tara	Bijaya Jena	Bijaya Jena, Sunil Chourasia, Anita Das		
Udandi Sita	Avatar Singh	Uttam Mohanty, Bijay Mohanty, Aparajita Mohanty		
