= List of Odia films of 1980 =

This is a list of films produced by the Ollywood film industry based in Bhubaneshwar and Cuttack in 1980:

== A-Z ==
Title	Director	Cast	Genre	Notes
1980
Agni Parikshya	Balal Sen	Sriram Panda, Mahashweta Roy		
Alibha Daga	Ramaraman Padhi	Suresh Mahapatra, Anita Das, Tandra Roy		
Anuraag	Nitai Palit	Ajit Das, Malvika Mohanty		
Anuradha	Shashidar	Raghu Misra, Jaya Swami		
Aparichita	Sadhu Meher	Sarat Pujari, Aparajita Mohanty		
Bata Abata	Brundaban Jena	Ajit Das, Bijaya Jena		
Danda Balunga	Mohammed Mohsin	Uttam Mohanty, Aparajita		
Jai Maa Mangala	Akshya Mohanty	Chakrapani, Roja Ramani		
Jhieenki Jhinka	Brundaban Jena	Ajit Das, Jaya Swami		
Maa O Mamata	Prashanta Nanda	Prashanta Nanda, Mahasweta Roy		
Maana Abhiman	Biswajeet Das	Uttam Mohanty, Jairam Samal		
Rama Balaram	A. Sanjeevi	Uttam Mohanty, Anita Das		
Ramayana	Gobind Tej	Uttam Mohanty, Subhra pati		
Seeta Labkush	Jagdish Chandra	Uttam Mohanty, Aparajita Mohanty,Chakrapani,Roja Ramani		
Tapasya	Nagen Roy	Ajit Das, Anita Das		
Trinatha Mela	Krushna Chandra Rath	Rabindra Kumar Rath, Subhra Pati		
