= List of Odia films of 1981 =

This is a list of films produced by the Ollywood film industry based in Bhubaneshwar and Cuttack in 1981:

== A-Z ==
Title	Director	Cast	Genre	Notes
1981
Akshi Tritiya	Babulal Doshi	Uttam Mohanty, Mahashweta Roy		
Arati	J.H. Satar	Uttam Mohanty, Tandra Roy, Anita Das		
Batashi Jhada	Ramesh Mohanty	Kasi Ratha, Jaya Swami		
Bilwa Mangala	J.H. Satar	Radha Panda		
Devajani	Byomokesh Tripathy	Uttam Mohanty, Sharabani Ray		
Hira Moti Manika	J. Adeni	Prashanta Nanda, Mahasweta Ray, Dhira Biswal		
Kachaghara	Byomkesh Tripathi	Bijayini Misra, Surya Misra		
Kie Jite Kie Hare	Nitai Palit			
Manasi	Malaya Mitra	Shriram Panda, Tripura Misra		
Nila Saila	Akshaya Mohanty (Kashyap)	Saudamini, Radha Panda		
Pooja	Prashanta Nanda	Prashanta Nanda, Mahasweta Roy		
Pujarini	J. Adeni	Niharika Sahu		
Sei Sura	Niranjan Dey	Mahashweta Roy		
Tike hasa Tike Luha	Sushila Mukherjee	Bijay Mohanty, Mahasweta Roy		
Ulka	Surjya Misra	, Gloriya Mohanty, Mahashweta Roy		
