= List of Odia films of 1978 =

This is a list of films produced by the Ollywood film industry based in Bhubaneshwar and Cuttack in 1978:

== A-Z ==
| Title | Director | Cast | Genre | Notes |
|---|---|---|---|---|
1978
| Balidan | Prashanta Nanda | Prashanta Nanda Mohammad Mohsin Sujata Mahasweta Roy | | |
| Gauri | Dhir Biswal | Prashanta Nanda, Ajit Das, Mahasweta Roy | | |
| Janmadata | K.H.D. Rao | Shriram Panda, Mahasweta Roy,Chakrapani | | |
| Jhilmil | K.H.D. Rao | Shriram Panda, Mahasweta Roy,Luna mohapatra | | |
| Kabi Samrat Upendra Bhanja | R.G.Gop | Sarat Pujari, Uttam Mohanty, Mahasweta Roy,Chakrapani,Roja Ramani | | |
| Kula Chandrama | K.H.D. Rao | Chakrapani, Anita Das | | |
| Parivar | K.H.D. Rao | Chakrapani, Niharika | | |
| Pati Patni | M.S.K. Reddy | Sarat Pujari, Uttam Mohanty, Roja Ramani | | |
| Pipasha | Devi Das | Ajit Das, Tandra Roy | | |
| Saakhi Gopinath | Ganesh Mahapatra | Pradeep, Mala Bose, Padma Khanna | | |
| Samarpana | Prafulla Rath/N. Gopal | Sarat Pujari, Tandra Roy | | |
| Sankha Mahuri | Akshya Mohanty | Shriram Panda, Uttam Mohanty, Mahasweta Roy | | |
| Sati Anusaya | A. Sanjeevi | Chakrapani, Narendra Mishra, Mahasweta Roy,Roja Ramani | | |
| Topoi | Sarat Pujari | Prashanta Nanda, Krushna Prava | | |
