= List of Odia films of 1982 =

This is a list of films produced by the Ollywood film industry based in Bhubaneshwar and Cuttack in 1982:

== A-Z ==
Title	Director	Cast	Genre	Notes
1982
Ashanta Graha	Sarat Pujari	Hemant Das, Mahasweta Roy		
Astaraga	Sarat Pujari	Sarat Pujari, Aparajita Mohanty		Debut film of Aparajita Mohanty
Baje Bainsi Nache Gunghura	Kelucharan Mohapatra	Sangeeta Das, Bibek Satpathy		
Basanti Apa	J. Adeni	Jaya B., Dawood, Dilip		
Hisab Nikas	Prashanta Nanda	Prashanta Nanda, Shriram Panda, Mahasweta Roy, Deepa Sahu		First Cinemascope film in Oriya
Jwain Pua	Dinen Gupta	Sharat Pujari, Uttam Mohanty, Mithu Mukharji, Jharana Das		
Mu tume O Se	Kumar Anand	Sriram Panda, Ajit Das, Sujata Anand		
Phoola Chandana	Mohammed Mohsin	Uttam Mohanty, Aparajita Mohanty, Ajit Das		
Samaya Bada Balawan	Sisir Misra	Uttam Mohanty, Shriram Panda, Mahasweta Roy, Bijay Mohanty, Roja Ramani		
Seeta Rati	Manmohan Mahapatra	Arun Nanda, Mahasweta Roy, Hemanta Das		
