= List of Odia films of 1997 =

This is a list of films produced by the Ollywood film industry based in Bhubaneshwar and Cuttack in 1997:

== A–Z ==
| Title | Director | Cast | Genre | Notes |
|---|---|---|---|---|
1997
| Asuchi Mo Kalia Raja | Surya Misra | Siddhanta Mahapatra, Mohini Shilapi | | |
| Bapa | Prashanta Nanda | Siddhanta Mahapatra, Mama Mishra | | |
| Ganga Jamuna | Hara Patnaik | Siddhanta Mahapatra, Rachana Banerjee, Mihir Das | | Remake of Bollywood chart buster, Chaalbaaz. |
| Lakhe Siba Puji Paichi Pua | Mohamadd Mohsin | Siddhanta Mahapatra, Rachana Banerjee | | |
| Nari Bi Pindhipare Rakta Sindura | Hara Patnaik | Siddhanta Mahapatra, Rachana Banerjee | | Remake of Hindi film Khoon Bhari Mang |
| Ram Laxman | Sangam Biswal | Bijay Mohanty, Tandra Roy | | |
| Savitree | Jitendra Mohapatra | Sritam Das, Bijay Mohanty, Mihir Das | | |
| Shesha Drushti | A. K. Bir | Sarat Pujari, Narendra Mohanty, Neelam Mukherjee | | National Award for Best Film in Oriya language |
