= List of Odia films of 2003 =

This is a list of films produced by the Ollywood film industry based in Bhubaneshwar and Cuttack in 2003:

== A-Z ==
Title	Director	Cast	Genre	Notes
2003
Ae Jugara Krushna Sudama ଏଇ ଯୁଗର କୃଷ୍ଣ ସୁଦାମା	Hara Patnaik	Uttam Mohanty, Mithun Chakraborty		Remake of Hindi movie Khudgarz
Aw Aaakare Aa ଅ 'ଆ'କାରେ ଆ	Subash Das	Dipti Panda, Adyasa Mahapatra		
ବାହୁଡ଼ିବେ ମୋ ଜଗା ବଳିଆ		Siddhanta Mahapatra, Pintu Nanda		Remake of Hindi movie Karan Arjun
ଯେ ପାଞ୍ଚେ ପର ମନ୍ଦ	Himanshu Parija	Siddhanta Mahapatra, Pinki Pradhan, Mihir Das		BOL RADHA BOL
Katha Deithili Maa Ku କଥା ଦେଇଥିଲି ମା'କୁ	Himanshu Parija	Siddhanta Mahapatra, Anu Chowdhury		
Maa Mangala ମା' ମଙ୍ଗଳା		Minaketan Das, Naina Das, Saroj Das		
Rakta Sindura	Hara Patnaik	Siddhanta Mahapatra		
Sarapancha Babu	Chakrapani	Siddhanta Mahapatra, Rachana Banerjee, Jairam Samal		
Sata Michha ସତ ମିଛ	Raju Misra	Sarat Pujari Sweta Mallik		
ସୁନା ଶଙ୍ଖାଳୀ	Ravi Kinnagi	Jeet, Mihir Das		Remake of Hindi movies Janwar and Jeet
Bidhata	Bishnu Datta	Siddhanta Mahapatra, Jairam Samal		
