= List of Odia films of 1994 =

This is a list of films produced by the Ollywood film industry based in Bhubaneshwar and Cuttack in 1994:

== A-Z ==
Title	Director	Cast	Genre	Notes
1994
Akuha Katha	Tarun Majumdar	Uttam Mohanty, Mahashweta Roy		
Bhai Hela Bhagari	Ravi Kinnagi	Siddhanta Mahapatra, Rachna Banerjee		
Gadhi Janile Ghara Sundara	Basant Sahu	Uttam Mohanty, Aparajita Mohanty,		
Lubeidak	P. L. Das	Hanu Dulari, Satya Mishra, Premalata Das		
Mahua	Haish Mohanty	Sriram Panda, Singdha Mohanty		
Mukti Mashal	Shantunu Misra	Mihir Das, Aparajita Mohanty		
Naga Jyoti	Ram Narayan	Uttam Mohanty, Satabdi Roy, Anushree Das		
Nirbachana	Biplab Roy Choudhary	Bhim Singh, Bidyut Prava Patnaik, Sangeeta Dutta		
Pacheri Uthila Majhi Duaru	Bijay Bhaskar	Uttam Mohanty, Anita Das		
Rakhile Siba Mariba Kie	Binoda Nanda	Upasana Singh, Uttam Mohanty		
Sagar Ganga	Raju Misra	Anoop Misra, Rachana Banerjee		
Suna Bhauja	Sisir Misra	Aparajita Mohanty, Jairam Samal		
