= List of Odia films of 1989 =

This is a list of films produced by the Ollywood film industry based in Bhubaneshwar and Cuttack in 1989:

== A-Z ==
Title	Director	Cast	Genre	Notes
1989
Akashra Aakhi	Pankaj Pani	Sriram Panda, Mihir Das, Ajaya Das,Jayee,		
Asuchi Mo Kalia Suna	Raju Misra	Shriram Panda		
Bhukha	Sabyasachi Mahapatra	Sarat Pujari, Swati Roy, Sadhu Meher	Drama based on Sambalpuri, a novel by Manglu Charan Biswal	First Sambalpuri language movie, Special Jury Award Best Feature Film at 28th Gijjon International Film Festival, Spain
Bidhira Bidhan	Mahamad Mohsin	Uttam Mohanty, Aparajita Mohanty, Bijay Mohanty		
Jaa Devi Sarbabhuteshu	Prashanta Nanda	Prashanta Nanda, Mahasweta Roy, Srikant, Charanraj		
Loot Taraj	Prashanta Nanda	Prashanta Nanda		
Mamata Ra Dori	Mahamad Mahsin	Uttam Mohanty, Aparajita Mohanty, Bijay Mohanty		
Naya Chakra	Prashanta Nanda	Prashanta Nanda,		
Panchu Pandav	Sisir Mohan Pati	Prashanta Nanda, Shriram Panda, Uttam Mohanty, Mahasweta Roy, Shrikant	Story of five friends from different places, who kidnap a girl for ransom, only to find that they are part of a conspiracy	
Pratisodha Aparadh Nuhen	Binoda Nanda			
Raja Rani				
Rajanigandha	Bijay Misra	Uttam Mohanty		
Sagar	Raju Misra			
Sasti	Brundaban Jena	Bijaya Jena		
Tathapi	Man Mohan Mahapatra			
Topaye sindura Dipata Shankha	J.H. Sattar	Tapas Paul, Debashree Roy, Uttam Mohanty, Aparajita		
