= List of Odia films of 1987 =

This is a list of films produced by the Ollywood film industry based in Bhubaneshwar and Cuttack in 1987:

== A-Z ==
Title	Director	Cast	Genre	Notes
1987
Anyaya Sahibi Nahin (1987)	Ashok Sharma	Sriram Panda, Uttam Mohanty, Shehnaz Kudia		
Badhu Nirupama	Jugala Devata	Shriram Panda		
Basanti Apa	S.K. Kalim			
Bhanga Silhat		Manjula Kanwar		Kanwar received Best Supporting Actress, 1987 National Film Awards
Bhuli Huena	Bijay Mohanty	Shriram Panda		
Chaka Akhi Sabu Dekhuchi	Raju Misra	Uttam Mohanty, ShreePrada		
Eai Ta Duniya	Mohammed Mohsin	Uttam Mohanty, Aparajita Mohanty		
Golam Giri	Prashanta Nanda	Prashanta Nanda, Uttam Mohanty, Mahasweta Roy		
Jaydeva	Shyamal Mukherjee			
Kasturi	J. H. Sattar			
Majhi Pahacha	Man Mohan Mahapatra			
Micha Maya Ra Sansar	Uday Shankar Pani	Shriram Panda, Tandra Roy		
Sabu Mayare Baya	Sabyasachi Mohapatra	Prashanta Nanda, Pruthiraj Nayak, Baishali		
Tunda Baida	Gobind Tej	Uttam Mohanty, Aparajita Mohanty, Ajit Das		
