= List of Odia films of 1986 =

Ollywood-produced films

This is a list of films produced by the Ollywood film industry based in Bhubaneshwar and Cuttack in 1986:

== A-Z ==
Title	Director	Cast	Genre	Notes
1986
Bagula Baguli	Prashanta Nanda	Prashanta Nanda, Mahasweta Roy, Srikant		
Chha Mana Atha Guntha	Parbati Ghosh	Bijay Mohanty, Parbati Ghosh, Sarat Pujari		
Ei Aama Sansara	Sisir Misra	Bijay Mohanty, Sriram Panda, Tandra Ray		
Jor Jar Mulak Tar	Raju Mishra	Uttam Mohanty, Sriram Panda, Aparajita Mohanty		
Kuhudi	Man Mohan Mahapatra			
Manika	R. Asrar			
Manisha	Jyoti Prakash	Bijay Mohanty, Aparajita Mohanty, Braja Das		
Paka Kambal Pot Chhota	Prashanta Nanda	Prashanta Nanda, Uttam Mohanty, Mahasweta Roy		
Sansara	Debi Prasad Das	Bijay Mohanty, Tandra Ray		
Trisandhya	Man Mohan Mahapatra			
