= List of Odia films of 2005 =

This is a list of films produced by the Ollywood film industry based in Bhubaneshwar and Cuttack in 2005:

== A-Z ==
Title	Director	Cast	Genre	Notes
2005
Agni Parikshya	Surya Misra	Siddhanta Mahapatra, Anu Chowdhury		
Arjun	Hara Patnaik	Anubhav Mohanty, Rameswari, Gargi Mohanty, Hara Patnaik		Remake of Telugu movie Nijam
Babu I Love You	Sanjay Nayak	Chandan Kar, Archita Sahu, Anu Chowdhury		The Best Actress Award to Archita in 2006
Bhagya Chakra	Basant Sahu	Anubhav Mohanty, Anu Chowdhury, Barsha Priyadarshini, Siddhanta Mahapatra		
Eithhi Swarga Eithhi Narka		Siddhanta Mahapatra, Jyoti Misra, Jairam Samal		
I Love You	Hara Patnaik	Anubhav Mohanty, Namrata Thapa		Best actor award Anubhav Mohanty; Remake of Telugu super hit movie Nuvvu Vastavani
Jai Sriram	Trupti Biswal	Antara Biswas, boby mishra, Mihir Das		
Jiwan Mrityu	Raju Misra	Amelie Panda, Mihir Das, Sunil Kumar, Lipsa Satpathy		
Nayaka Nuhain Khala Nayaka	Ratan Adikari	Anubhav Mohanty, Rachana Banerjee		
O My Love	Sanjay Nayak	Rajdip, Archita Sahu, Hari		The Best Newcomer Award to Archita in 2005
Om Shanti Om	Prashanta Nanda	Siddhanta Mahapatra, Uttam Mohanty, Lipi		
Prathama Prema	Hara Patnaik	Anubhav Mohanty, Sugena Choudhry, Meghna Misra		
Priya Mo Priya	Gudia Mohapatra	Anubhav Mohanty, Namrata Thapa, Bijay Mohanty		Remake of Hindi movie Raja Hindustani
Topae Sindura Di Topa Luha	Sanjay Nayak	Siddhanta Mahapatra, Anubhav Mohanty, Anu Chowdhury, Barsa Priyadarshini		Three state film awards in 2005-2006
Tate Mo Rana	Sanjay Nayak	Siddhanta Mahapatra Barsa Priyadarshini, Mihir Das		
Tu Mo Akhira Tara	Sanjay Nayak	Siddhanta Mahapatra, Barsa Priyadarshini, Kuna Tripathy		
