= List of Odia films of 1990 =

This is a list of films produced by the Ollywood film industry based in Bhubaneshwar and Cuttack in 1990:

== A-Z ==
Title	Director	Cast	Genre	Notes
1990
Aee Sangharsa	Rajani Kant	Bijay Mohanty, Deepti Naval	Odia	
Agnee Beena	Manmohan Mahapatra	Hemanta Das, Bijay Samal, Pushpa Panda	Odia	
Ama Ghara	Ravi Kinnagi			
Andha Diganta	Manmohan Mahapatra	Arun Nanda, Jaya Swami, Manimala Devi		
Chakadola Karuchi Leela	Para Patnaik	Uttam Mohanty, Aparajita Mohanty		
Daiba Daudi	Hara Patnaik	Uttam Mohanty, Rekha Jain, Ellora Patnaik	Odia	
Hasa Luha Bhara Dunia	Pranaba Das			
Hisaba kariba Kalia	Sumanta Dey	Debu Bose, Debu Bramha, Mihir Das		
Kalia Bharasa	Sidhartha			
Kandhei	Prashanta Nanda	Prashanta Nanda, Shriram Panda, Mahasweta Roy		
Maa Mate Shakti De	Samsan Lima			
Maa O Mamata		Sadashiv Amrapurkar, Anu Choudhury, Mihir Das		
Paradeshi Chadhei	Ravi Kinnagi	Uttam Mohanty, Aarminta		
Thakura Achanti Chau Bahaku	Bijay Bhaskar			
