= List of Odia films of 1979 =

This is a list of films produced by the Ollywood film industry based in Bhubaneshwar and Cuttack in 1979:

== A-Z ==
Title	Director	Cast	Genre	Notes
1979
Anuraga	Nitai Palit	Arun Misra, Biren Mohanty, Malavika Roy		
Chinha Achinha	Kumar Anand	Uttam Mohanty, Mahasweta Roy, Sujata		
Nijhum Rati Ra Saathi	Biswajit Das	Uttam Mohanty, Mahasweta Roy		
Mathua Vijay	A. Sanjeevi	Shrikant, Anita Das, Rupalekha		
Nila Madhab	J. P. Bhagat	Pratihari, Mamata		
Samar Salim Saimon	Sailaja Nanda	Sujata, Anita Das		
Sautuni	Akshya Mohanty	Bijay Mohanty, Tandra Roy, Anita Das		
Sri Jagannath	Bijay Bhaskar	Chakrapani, Meenushree, Jharana Das		
SriKrushna Raas Leela	Sona Mukherjee	Rabindra, Tapati, Priti		
