= List of Odia films of 1993 =

This is a list of films produced by the Ollywood film industry based in Bhubaneshwar and Cuttack in 1993:

== A-Z ==
Title	Director	Cast	Genre	Notes
1993
Asha	Shantunu Misra	Asrumochan Mohanty, Aparajita Mohanty		
Bhagya Hate Doro	Hara Patnaik	Uttam Mohanty, Bijay Mohanty, Rekha Jain		
Byabhichara	Raghu Misra	Bijay Mohanty, Nari		
Dadagiri	Rakesh Mohanty	Debu Bose, Debu Bramha, Mihir Das		
Ghara Sansara	Prashant Nanda	Prasenjit Chatterjee, Satabdi Roy		
Indradhanura Chhai	Sushant Misra	Surya Mohanty, Sonia Mahapatra, Robin Das	Drama	Mishra won the Grand Prix in 1995.
Lavanya Preeti	A. K. Bir	Tara Shankar Misra		Misra won the best child artist award in National Film Awards, 1994.
Pathara Khasuchi Bada Deulu	Raju Misra	Sirkant Gautam, Shrishtee		
Shardhanjali	Pankaja Pani	Siddhanta Mahapatra, Lekha Nanda		
