= List of Odia films of 2006 =

This is a list of films produced by the Ollywood film industry based in Bhubaneshwar and Cuttack in 2006:

== A-Z ==
| Title | Director | Cast | Genre | Notes |
|---|---|---|---|---|
2006
| De Maa Shakti De | Sanjay Nayak | Archita Sahu, Siddhanta Mahapatra, Jairam Samal | | |
| Hasila Sansara Bhangila Kie | Sanjay Nayak | Siddhanta Mahapatra, Anu Chowdhury'Jairam Samal | | |
| I Love My India | Sangam Biswal | Budhaditya, Namrata Thapa | | Loosely based on Hindi movie Kaho Naa... Pyaar Hai, starring Hrithik Roshan |
| Prema Rutu Aslilare | Sanjay Nayak | Arindam Roy, Namrata Thapa | | |
| Priya Mo Asiba Pheri | Surya Misra | Rajdeep, Pintu Nanda, Meghna Misra | | |
| Rakate Lekhichi Naa | Himanshu Parija | Siddhanta Mahapatra, Ayesha Jhulka, Jairam Samal | | Loosely based on the Hindi movie Tere Naam |
| Rakhi Bandhili Mo Rakhiba Mana | Sanjay Nayak | Siddhanta Mahapatra, Anu Chowdhury | | |
| Shasu Ghara Chalijibi | Basanta Sahu | Siddhanta Mahapatra, Anu Chowdhury, Mihir Das, Muna Khan, Aparajita Mohanty | | Nine awards Golden Jubilee Awards,Chitrapuri |
| Thank You Bhagban | Hara Patnaik | Anubhav Mohanty, Barsha Priyadarshini, Hara Patnaik | | Remake of Judwaa and Kishen Kanhaiya |
| Tu Eka Am Saha Bharasa | Shakti Baral | Siddhanta Mahapatra, Jyoti Misra, Jairam Samal | | |
| Tu Mo Manara Mita | Harnath Chakarbarty | Sabyasachi Misra | | |
