= List of Odia films of 2002 =

This is a list of films produced by the Ollywood film industry based in Bhubaneshwar and Cuttack in 2002:

== A-Z ==
Title	Director	Cast	Genre	Notes
2002
Dharma Sahile Hela	Mohmadd Mohsin	Siddhanta Mahapatra, Rachana Banerjee		
Dharini	Susant Mishra	Kirti Kulhari, Rachna Shah	Drama	
Ghare Sindura Dhare Luha	Gobind Tej	Siddhanta Mahapatra Anu Chowdhury		
Gopare Badhuchu Kala Kanhei	Asit Pati	Siddhanta Mahapatra, Mihir Das		
Maa kande puate pain	Asit Pati	Siddhanta Mahapatra, Jairam Samal		
Maa O Mamata		Anu Chowdhury, Mihir Das		
Mana Rahigala Tumari Thare	Sanjay Nayak	Siddhanta Mahapatra, Anu Chowdhury, Jyoti Misra		
Muhurta	Man Mohan Mahapatra			
Pua Mora Jagata Jita	Sanak Devata	Siddhanta Mahapatra Anu Chowdhury, Bijay Mohanty		
Rahichi Rahibi Tohri Pain	Sanjay Nayak	Siddhanta Mahapatra		Best music director Pravanshu Samantaray and Malay Mishra
Samay Chaka Re Sansaar Ratha	Jitendra Mohapatra	Bijay Mohanty, Mihir Das, Aparajita Mohanty, Siddhanta Mahapatra		
Sei Jhiati	Sanjay Pathak	Siddhanta Mahapatra, Rachana Banerjee		
Sindura Nuhein Khela Ghara	Rabi Kinagi	Siddhanta Mahapatra, Rachana Banerjee		
Wrong Number	Bobby Islam	Jyoti Misra, Pradyumna Lenka, Pintu Nanda		
Jiddi		Siddhanta Mahapatra, Bijay Mohanty		
