= List of Odia films of 2000 =

This is a list of films produced by the Ollywood film industry based in Bhubaneshwar and Cuttack in 2000:

== A-Z ==
Title	Director	Cast	Genre	Notes
2000
Ama Ghar Ama Sansar	Mohmadd Mohsin	Prajukta Kulkarni, Bijay Mohanty		
Babu Parsuram	Jyoti Prakash	Bijay Mohanty, Mihir Das, Sritam Das, Rekha Rao		
Bou	Sabyasachi Mohapatra	Bijay Mohanty, Maheswata Roy, Siddhanta Mahapatra, Jyoti Misra, Usasi Misra		
Cooli	Swapan Saha	Mithun Chakraborty, Abhishek Chattopadhyay	Romance	
Hari Bhai Harena	Raju Mishra	Sunil Kumar, Anu Chowdhury		
Kandhei Akhire Luha	Ravi Kinagi	Siddhanta Mahapatra, Rachana Banerjee		
Kashia Kapila	Jitendra Mohapatra	Bijay Mohanty, Ashrumochan Mohanty		
Laxmi Pratima	Mohmadd Mohsin	Siddhanta Mahapatra, Rachana Banerjee		
Pritsodha Apradha Nuhe	Binod Nanda	Uttam Mohanty, Bijay Mohanty		
Raja	Snehasis Chakraborty	Rachana Banerjee, Mithun Chakraborty		
