= List of Odia films of 2001 =

This is a list of films produced by the Ollywood film industry based in Bhubaneshwar and Cuttack in 2001:

== A-Z ==
Title	Director	Cast	Genre	Notes
2001
Baaja(Hindi)	A. K. Bir	Ram Awana, Saroj Bhagwar, Chitra Pandey		A.K. Bir got best Children Film award in National Film Award 2003
Baaji	Ashok Pati	Siddhanta Mahapatra, Anu Chowdhury		
Call Waiting		Abhaya Kumar, Leslie Tripathy		
Dharma Debata	Bijay Bhaskar	Siddhanta Mahapatra, Bijay Mohanty, Mihir Das		
Katha Rahithiba Kal Kalku	Asit Pati	Siddhanta Mahapatra		
Magunira Sagada	Prafulla Mohanty	Ashru Mochan Mohanty, Jaya Seal	Social	National Award for Best Oriya Film (2002)
Mo Kola To Jhulana	Himansu Parijaa	Siddhanta Mahapatra, Rachana Banerjee, Bijay Mohanty, Hara Patnaik		
Pari Mahal	Bikash Das	Siddhanta Mahapatra, Maiphus Aparajita Mohanty		
