= List of Odia films of 1996 =

This is a list of films produced by the Ollywood film industry based in Bhubaneshwar and Cuttack in 1996:

== A-Z ==
Title	Director	Cast	Genre	Notes
1996
Jashoda	Hara Patnaik	Siddhanta Mahapatra, Rachana Banerjee		
Jhili	Sabyasachi Mahapatra	Soumen Pujari, Swati Ray		
Laxman Rekha	Mohamadd Mohsin	Siddhanta Mahapatra, Rachana Banerjee		
Manara Murchana	Shantunu Misra	Swati Ray		
Mo Kola To Jhulana	Himanshu Parija	Siddhanta Mahapatra, Rachana Banerjee		
Mokshya	Malati Roy, Gauri Shankar Das	Pushpa Panda		
Nila Masterani	Chakradhara Sahu	Minaketan, Priyanka		In 1997, Nila Masterani received State Film awards in five categories: for Special jury, best editing, best sound recording, best story, and best actor.
Pua Mora Bhola Sankara	Hara Patnaik	Uttam Mohanty, Aparajita Mohanty, Siddhanta Mahapatra, Priyanka		
Sakal Tirtha	Sangrama Biswal	Uttam Mohanty, Aparajita Mohanty		
Sakhi Rakhiba Mo Shankha Sindura	Arun Mohanty	Siddhanta Mahapatra		
Shunya Swaroopa	Himansu Sekhar Khatua	Ch. Bikash Das, Surya Mohanty Ch. Jaya prakash Das Aparajita Mohanty		The film won a National Award in 1997. It also won five State Film Awards, including Best Feature Film, Best Director, Best Cinematography, Best Music, Best Art Direction. It participated in the Rotterdam International Film Festival 1997 (Netherlands), Goteberg International Film Festival 1997 (Sweden), Sochi International Film Festival (Russia), and Cinemajove International Film Festival (Spain).
Suhaga Sindura	Hara Patnaik	Siddhanta Mahapatra, Rachana Banerjee		Remake of Hindi film Hum Aapke Dil Mein Rehete Hai
Suna Pua	Bijay Bhaskar	Tapas Paul, Aparajita Mohanty		
Vasudha	Avatar Singh	Aparajita Mohanty, Mihir Das		
