= List of Odia films of 1976 =

This is a list of films produced by the Ollywood film industry based in Bhubaneshwar and Cuttack in 1976:

== A-Z ==
Title	Director	Cast	Genre	Notes
1976
Amar Prem	Palash Bannerjee, Gopal Ghosh	Hemanta Das, Suresh Mahapatra, Banaja Mohanty	Drama	
Bali Ghara	Abhiyatrik	Sadhu Meher, Prashanta Nanda, Preeti		
Gapa Hele Bi Sata	Nageen Roy	Harish, Banaja Mohanty		First Oriya color movie
Hira Moti Manika	J. Adeni	Prashanta Nanda, Mahasweta Roy, Dhira Biswal		
Krishna Sudama	Nitai Palit	Gobinda Tej, Tripura Misra, Anita Das		
Shesha Shrabana	Prashanta Nanda	Prashanta Nanda, Mahasweta Roy, Hemanta Das		
Sindura Bindu	Sisir Misra	Shriram Panda, Prashanta Nanda, Tripura Misra	Romance	
