= List of Odia films of 2021 =

This is a list of Odia films that are released in 2021.

List of Odia films produced in the Ollywood in India that are released in the year 2021.

== Films ==
#	Title	Director	Cast	Release date	Ref
1	Paapa	Ashok Pati	Elina Samantray, Ankit Kumar, Pinky Pradhan, Ashrumochan Mohanty	10 January	
2	Romeo Raja	Rakesh Samal	Amlan Das, Tamanna Vyas, Harihara Mahapatra	22 January	
3	Srikshetra	Tapas Saragharia	Sidhant Mohapatra, Sambeet Acharya, Tamanna Vyas, Braja Singh	24 January	
4	Tu Bhari Beautiful	Sanjay Nayak	Jyoti Ranjan Nayak, Lipsa Mishra, Archita Mohanty, Kuna Tripathy, Puspa Panda	31 January	
5	Super Boy	K. Anish	Jyoti Ranjan Nayak, Tamanna Vyas, Subhasish Sharma, Pintu Nanda	12 February	
6	Roll No.-27 Sujata Senapati	Ashok Pati	Archita Sahoo, Mihir Das, Choudhury Jayprakash Das, Jiban Panda, Pritiraj Satapathy	21 February	
7	Bisarjana	Ramakrushna Padhi	Shradha Panigrahi, Subhasish Sharma, Lorens Behera	7 March	
8	Tandav	Pruthwiraj Patnaik	Debasish Pati, Anisha Sharma, Mihir Das, Manoj Mishra	11 March	
9	Chumki My Darling	Sudhanshu Mohan Sahoo	Sameet Acharya, Mahasweta Ray, Pradyumna Lenka, Puspa Panda, Rabi Mishra, Saroj Das	14 March	
10	Tume Mo Sankha Tume Mo Sindura	Ranjit Barik	Abhishek Rath, Ankita Das, Mahima Das, Mihir Das, Shakti Baral	1 April	
11	Jungle	T. Ganesh	Suaj, Ahana Baral, Ilu Banarjee, Rabi Mishra	9 April	
12	Oye Geetar	Appu Kanungo	Aman, Ahana Baral, Debu Pattnaik, Jiban Panda	14 April	
13	Sinthiru Sindura Alapa Dura	Ranjit Barik	Prabhas Sarangi, Rumi, Priyanka, Lucky, Asit Pati	21 April	
14	72 Hours - Life or Death		Manoj Mishra, Anu Choudhury, Mihir Das	25 April	
15	Indrajal	Peenu Nayak	Sambit Acharya, Debjani, Hara Rath, Tapi Mishra, Satwaki Mishra, Pradyumna Lenka	2 May	
16	Kokoli: Fish out of water	Snehasish Das	Gargi Mohanty, Linkan Pattnaik, Dharitri Khandual, Bhaswati Basu, Dipanwit Dashmohapatra	12 June	
17	Ea Bi Gote Love Story	Mrutyunjaya Sahu	Raj Rajesh Panda, Divya Mohanty, Rakesh Deo, Deepika Tripathy, Ameli Panda, Pintu Nanda	20 June	
18	Pihu	Chinmaya Mishra	Sidhanta Mohapatra, Anu Choudhury, Manoj Mishra	20 June	
19	Rati Sari Sari Jauchi	Anupam Patnaik	Raj Rajesh Panda, Riya Dey, Sukanta Rath, Raimohan Parida, Jiban Panda	15 August	
20	Sahid Raghu Sardar	Rajeev Mohanty	Debasish Patra, Kavya Keeran, Rudra Panigrahi, Jeena Samal, Lipsa Mishra	16 August	
21	Maa ra Mamata	Himanshu Parija	Sritam Das, Anu Choudhury, Sukanta Rath, Pradyuman Lenka	22 August	
22	Tu Mora Sathire 2	Raja Dash	Sailendra Samantaray, Divya Mohanty, Kuna Tripathy, Bunty R. Samal	29 August	
23	To Pain Pheribi Basudha Chiri	Sanjaya Nayak	Chandan Kar, Namrata Singh Deo, Sritam Das, Premanjan Parida, Biju Badajena, Saroj Das, Dushmant Panda	29 August	
24	Paro Hates Devdas	Ashok Pati	Babi Mishra, Priya Choudhury, Manaswini Pati, Srijit Mohapatra	29 August	
25	Chakshubandhan	Rajendra Mahanta	Bhoomika Dash, Raj Rajesh, Ishani Sengupta, Rishi	10 September	
26	Premikaya Namah	Sudhakar Vasant	Pradipa Kumar Sahu, Tanushree, Sayal, Pintu Nanda, Tribhuban Panda	12 September	
27	Rangila Bohu	Ashwini Garnayak	Debasish Patra, Lipsa Mishra, Ushasi Mishra, Choudhury Jayprakash Das	12 September	
28	Mane Mane Mana Khojuthila	Narasingh Parhi	Omkar Acharya, Namrata Singh Deo, Mihir Das, Priyanka Sahu, Ashrumohan Mohanty	8 October	
29	Ardha Satya	Bharadwaj Panda	Hara Rath, Shradha Panigrahi, RJ Guddi, Krishna Sourav, Shailen Routray, Rabindranath Mishra, Barsa Samal	8 October	
30	Sastharu Nasta	Murali Krishna	Ardhendu Sahu, Tamanna Vyas, Mahasweta Ray, Ilu Banarjee, Ratan Meher, Sujit Paikray, Rakhi Dash	10 October	
31	Arundhati	Ramesh Rout	Rajveer, Elina Samantaray, Sanjay Bhol, Babi Mishra, Pradhyuman Lenka	13 October	
32	Mana Mo Neigalu re	Sanjay Nayak	Jyoti Ranjan Nayak, Bhoomika Dash, Kuna Tripathy, Pushpa Panda, Biju Badajena	14 October	
33	Gaan ra naan Galuapura	Jitendra Mohapatra	Papu Pom Pom, Manisha Dhar Mohapatra, Sujit Paikray, Mihir Das, Kuna Tripathy	15 October	
34	Hello Ravan	Ramesh Rout	Papu Pom Pom, Arabinda Sarangi, Pratibha Panda	15 October	
35	Durgatinasini 2	Ashwini Tripathy	Archita Sahoo, Samaresh Routray, Smita Mohanty, Pushpa Panda, Pintu Nanda	17 October	
36	Luchei De Mote Chhati Bhitare	Sanjay Nayak	Chandan Kar, Tamanna Vyas, Biranchi Narayan Nayak, Chakradhar Jena	17 October	
37	Chala Tike Prema Kariba	Saroj Kant	Devraj, Chinmayee Priyadarsini, Lipsa Mishra, Salil Mitra, Pupindar Singh	22 October	
38	Bapa ICU re Achhanti	Tapas Sargharia	Jagjit Pal, Mitali Sargharia, Pradyumna Lenka, Satwaki Mishra, Ratan Meher, Ushasi Mishra	31 October	
39	Lali Haba Kahara	Ashok Pati	Sambeet Acharya, Suryamayee Mohapatra, Babi Mishra, Pintu Nanda, Rabi Mishra	31 October	
40	2 Chocolate	Sushanta Mani	Lohitaksha Pattnaik, Swapna Priyadarsini, Neetu Singh, Chittaranjan Tripathy, Linkan Pattnaik	5 November	
41	Mr. Romeo	Ashwni Garnayak	Deepak Barik, Lipika Senapati, Pritiraj Satapathy, Pintu Nanada, Pradyumna Lenka, Harihar Mahapatra	7 November	
42	Bijayeeni	Sudhakar Vasant	Barsa Priyadarsini, Debasish Patra, Trupati Sinha	13 November	
43	Cuttack weds Sambalpur	Bapi Devid	Sambeet Acharya, Susmita Pradhan, Kuna Tripathy, Pintu Nanda	19 November	
44	Chorani	Mryutyunjay Sahu	Jagjit Pal, Sheetal Patra, Raimohan Parida, Pintu Nanda, Rakshi Dash	28 November	
45	Bhoka	Rajiv Mohanty	Ankit Kumar, Kavya Keeran, Kuna Tripathy, Pushpa Panda, Pratibha Panda	11 December	
46	Biswas	Chinmaya Das Pattnaik	Shahil Mishra, Sujay Mohanty, Arun Mohanty, Sagarika Das, Darshan Bhanjadeo, Arpita Das, Resli Patra	15 December	
47	Pratyaghat	Sanjay Ghosh	Ankit Kumar, Prakruti Mishra, Chinmaya Mishra, Biju Badajena	18 December	
48	Ardhangini	Bobby Islam	Debasish Patra, Monalisa Patra, Lipsa Mishra	19 December	
49	Pal Pal Tate Chahen	Sudhakar Vasant	Deepak Barik, Prachi Choudhury, Manasi Pal, Pintu Nanda, Pradyumna Lenka, Saroj Das	26 December	
50	Akhi Bujidele Tu	S.K. Muralidhar	Pupindar Singh, Deepika Tripathy, Jyotirmayee Bal, Samaresh Routray, Manoj Mishra, George Tiadi, Rabi Mishra	31 December	
51	Herogiri	Ashwini Garnayak	Akash Dasnayak, Megha Ghosh, Samaresh Routray, Pintu Nanda, Snigdha Mohanty, Salil Mitra, Minaketan, Debu Bose, Puspa Panda, Prakruti Mishra, Bidusmita, Guddu	31 December	
