= List of Odia films of 1975 =

This is a list of films produced in 1975 by the Ollywood film industry based in Bhubaneshwar and Cuttack.

== A-Z ==
Title	Director	Cast	Genre	Notes
1975
Jajabara	Trimurty	Shriram Panda, Banaja Mohanty, Hemanta Das		
Mamata	Byomokesh Tripathy	Prashanta Nanda, Sujata, Suresh		
Samaya	Ghanashyam Mahapatra	Prashanta Nanda, Tripura Misra, Shriram Panda		
