= List of Odia films of 1995 =

This is a list of films produced by the Ollywood film industry based in Bhubaneshwar and Cuttack in 1995:

== A-Z ==
Title	Director	Cast	Genre	Notes
1995
Kula Nandan	Himanshu Parija	Siddhanta Mahapatra, Meghana Mishra		
Mani Nageswari	Bijay Bhaskar	Siddhanta Mahapatra		
Mo Bhai Jaga	Rajani Kanta Samantaray	Nihar Samal, Puja Mishra		
Mo Mana Khali Tumari Pain	Shantunu Misra	Siddhanta Mahapatra, Bijay Mohanty		
Rakata Kahiba Kie Kahara	Mohamadd Mohsin	Siddhanta Mahapatra, Bijay Mohanty		
Rana Bhumi	Pranab Das	Siddhanta Mahapatra, Roopa Gangooly		
Subhadra	Prabhakar	Siddhanta Mahapatra, Mihir Das, Rachna Banerji		
Suna Panjuri	Ravi Kinnagi	Siddhanta Mahapatra, Indira Krishnan		
