= List of Odia films of 2004 =

This is a list of films produced by the Ollywood film industry based in Bhubaneshwar and Cuttack in 2004:

== A-Z ==
Title	Director	Cast	Genre	Notes
2004
Agnee	Swapna Shah	Prasonjeet, Rachana Banerjee		
Barsa My Darling	Hara Patnaik	Anubhav Mohanty, Ankita Banerjee, Hara Patnaik		Remake of Telugu movie Varsham
Join Ra Chauka Ku Sasurara Chhaka	Baby Islam	Hari		
Kotire Gotiye		Siddhanta Mahapatra		
Rakhile Jadi Se Mariba Kiye	Ritesh Nayak	Anu Chowdhury, Deepak Parida, Sadashiv Amrapurkar		
Saathire	Hara Patnaik	Anubhav Mohanty, Sritam Das, Madhumita Basu, Hara Patnaik		
