= List of Odia films of 1973 =

A list of films produced by the Ollywood film industry based in Bhubaneshwar and Cuttack in 1973:

== A-Z ==
Title	Director	Cast	Genre	Notes	Source	CBFC
1973
Ghara Sansara	Byomokesh Tripathy, Gopal Ghosh	Sarat Pujari, Prashanta Nanda, Sujata				U
Ghara Bahuda	Sona Mukherjee	Sujit, Sujata, Babi				U
Kanakalata	Ghanashyam Mahapatra	Harish, Sujata				U
