= List of Odia films of 1972 =

A list of films produced by the Ollywood film industry based in Bhubaneshwar and Cuttack in 1972:

== A-Z ==
Title	Director	Cast	Genre	Notes	Source	CBFC
1972
Dharitri	Nitai Palit	Shriram Panda, Prashanta Nanda, Dhir Biswal, Sandhya		won 2nd Odisha state film awards for Best film and best director		U
