= List of Odia films of 1974 =

This is a list of films produced by the Ollywood film industry based in Bhubaneshwar and Cuttack in 1974:

== A-Z ==
| Title | Director | Cast | Genre | Notes |
|---|---|---|---|---|
1974
| Mana Akasha | Nitai Palit | Shriram Panda, Tripura Misra, Shanti Swaroop | | |
