= List of Odia films of 1966 =

This is a list of films produced by the Ollywood film industry based in Bhubaneshwar and Cuttack in 1966:

== A-Z ==
Title	Director	Cast	Genre	Notes
1966
Matira Manisha	Mrinal Sen	Prashanta Nanda, Sarat Pujari, Sujata Anand, Bhanumati Devi		Based on Kalindi Charan Panigrahi's novel; National Award, Silver Lotus for Best Oriya Film
