= List of Odia films of 1967 =

Following is a list of films produced in 1967 by the Ollywood film industry based in Bhubaneshwar and Cuttack, India.

== A-Z ==
Title	Director	Cast	Genre	Notes
1967
Arundhati	Prafulla Sengupta	Sarat Pujari, Minati		
Bhai Bhauja	Sarathi	Babi, Manimala		

== See also ==
- 1967 in film
- 1967 in India
