= Rakta Golapa =

1977 Indian Odia-language film

- Poster
- Directed by: Bhimeswar Rao
- Written by: Bijay Kumar Nanda
- Produced by: Bibhuti Mishra; Sashanka Sekhar Mishra
- Starring: Suresh Misra; Banaja Mohanty; Sriram Panda; Radha Panda; Ramesh Panigrahi
- Cinematography: Benjamin
- Edited by: J. Narashima Rao
- Music by: Dhananjay Satpathy
- Production company: Banani Films
- Distributed by: Udaya Shashi Pictures
- Release date: 9 November 1977
- Running time: 166 min
- Country: India
- Language: Odia

Rakta Golapa is an Odia romantic tragedy released on 9 November 1977, starring Suresh Misra, Banaja Mohanty, Sriram Panda, Radha Panda and Ramesh Panigrahi.

== Synopsis ==
Sharat and Mira meet at college and fall deeply in love. Sharat's family is against their love, and force Sharat into an arranged marriage with Sneha, who is in love with Ajay. On seeing the marriage, Mira tries to commit suicide and vanishes from the scene. Sharat can't bear the thought of Mira's fate and goes mad. He tries to avoid his wife Sneha and grows to hate her. In the meantime, Sneha becomes pregnant. Everybody doubts Sneha about the father of the child. Ajay comes to the fore to clear the confusion. At last Sharat and Mira unite.

== Cast ==
- Suresh Mishra... Sharat
- Banaja Mohanty... Mira
- Sriram Panda... Ajay
- Vatchla... Sneha
- Radha Panda
- Nityananda Das
- Kunjananda
- Braja
- Ramesh Panigrahi
- Shanti Lata Das
- Halam... Dancer

== Soundtrack ==
The music for the film was composed by Dhananjay Satpathy. It was his debut as music composer and singer.

Song	Lyrics	Singer(s)
"Mamata Ra Madhumati Sarami Latika"	Narashingh Mohapatra	Akshaya Mohanty, S. Janaki
"Mana Rasia Re E Mora Mana Chhuin Ja Re"	Narashingh Mohapatra	Pranab Patnaik, Dhananjaya Satapathy, H.P.Geeta
"Manara Manisha Jadi"	Narashingh Mohapatra	S. Janaki
"Hi Darling! Akhire Akhire Dele Tu"	Gokulananda Parida	Akshaya Mohanty, Ramola
"Bholare Bhola"	Gokulananda Parida	Dhananjaya Satapathy

== Box office ==
Despite renowned actors, a good story and melodic music, the film was a box office flop. The reason being that the film was released in smaller towns and not in major cinemas.
