= List of Odia films of 1968 =

This is a list of films produced by the Ollywood film industry based in Bhubaneshwar and Cuttack in 1968:

== A-Z ==
Title	Director	Cast	Genre	Notes
1968
Kie Kahara	Nitai Palit	Sarat Pujari, Leela		
Stree	Sidharth	Gaur Ghosh, Sadhana		
