= Maharaja Krushna Chandra High School =

Maharaja Krushn Chandra High School, Baripada

Location
- Baripada, Odisha, India
- Coordinates: 21.937762°N 86.728422°E

Information
- Established: 1889 (137 years ago)
- Grades: Class 6th to 10th

Maharaja Krushna Chandra High School, Baripada, locally better known as MKC High School, is a high school in Baripada, Odisha. The high school was established in 1889. It is one of the oldest government schools in Odisha.

== Notable ==
- Uttam Mohanty, an actor in Odia language films
- Bijay Mohanty, an actor in Odia language films
- Jogesh Pati, an Indian-American theoretical physicist at the University of Maryland, USA
- Raghunath Murmu, an Indian Santali writer and educator. He developed the Ol Chiki script for Santali language.

== See also ==
- Board of Secondary Education, Odisha
