= Mr. Funtoosh =

Mr Funtoosh
- Movie poster
- Directed by: Raj Mukherjee
- Produced by: Pankaj Agarwal
- Starring: Prasenjit; Rachana Banerjee
- Music by: Shubhau
- Release date: 2 October 2008
- Country: India
- Language: Bengali

Mr Funtoosh is a 2008 Bengali-language action comedy film directed by Raj Mukherjee. It stars Prosenjit Chatterjee in dual roles alongside Rachana Banerjee in lead roles.

== Plot ==
Palash (Prasenjit), is an engineer who returns to his bustee home and slum-mates, who lose no time in jumping and jiving with baltis and jharu to welcome their guru back. Schoolteacher Rachana Banerjee bursts on the scene as the right match for Palash. But just when the lovey-dovey couple begins cavorting around trees, the bad guys surface. A vile landshark (Hara Pattanaik) tricks Palash into a real-estate project, only to gun him down soon after. For those who love Prosenjit as a deadly combo of action hero and comic man, enters Mr Fantoosh (Also Prasenjit) in Jackie Chan mode, spinning karate chops and one-liners that go: "Aami maari ekdin, byatha thakey teensho poyshotti din!” Ha-ha and dhishum-dhishum go hand in hand for Mr Fantoosh of the spiky hair and body-hugging ganjees. Newcomers Malabika (as Palash's sister) and Angshuman (as the villain's son)

== Cast ==
- Prasenjit in a dual role as Palash & Funtoosh
- Rachana Banerjee
- Malabika
- Angshuman
- Hara Pattanaik
