= List of Odia films of 1969 =

This is a list of films produced by the Ollywood film industry based in Bhubaneshwar and Cuttack in 1969:

== A-Z ==
Title	Director	Cast	Genre	Notes
1969
Bandhan	Nitai Palit	Prashanta Nanda, Geetanjali		
