= List of Odia films of 1949 =

This is a list of films produced by the Odia film industry based in Cuttack in 1949:

== A-Z ==
| Title | Director | Cast | Genre | Notes |
|---|---|---|---|---|
1949
| Lalita | Kalyan Gupta | Lokanath, Uma | Romance | It was the first Oriya post-Independence film, and the second Oriya film. |
