= List of Odia films of 1954 =

This is a list of films produced by the Ollywood film industry based in Cuttack in 1954:

== A-Z ==
Title	Director	Cast	Genre	Notes
1954
କେଦାରଗୌରୀ Kedar Gouri	Nitai Palit	Beena, Kishori Devi, Gaura Ghosh		
