= List of Odia films of 1956 =

This is a list of films produced by the Ollywood film industry based in Cuttack in 1956:

== A-Z ==
Title	Director	Cast	Genre	Notes
1956
ଭାଇ ଭାଇ; Bhai Bhai	Nitai Palit	Beena, Hemanta Das, Lila Dulali		
