= List of Odia films of 1936 =

This is a list of films produced by the Odia film industry based in Cuttack in 1936:

== A-Z ==
Title	Director	Cast	Genre	Notes
1936
Sita Bibaha	Mohan Sundar Deb Goswami	Makhanlal Bannerjee, Mohan Sunder Deb Goswami, Krushnachandra Singh	Mythological	First Oriya film
