= Debjani =

Debjani may refer to the following people:

Given name

- Debjani Chatterjee (born 1952), Indian-born British poet and writer
- Debjani Ghosh (born 1988), Bangladeshi born environmental engineer

Surname

- Ismael Debjani (born 1990), Belgian middle-distance runner
