= List of Odia films of 1964 =

This is a list of films produced by the Ollywood film industry based in Bhubaneshwar and Cuttack in 1964:

== A-Z ==
Title	Director	Cast	Genre	Notes
1964
Amada Bata (The Untrodden Road)	Amar Ganguly	Umakant, Jharana Das		
Sadhana	Prabhat Mukherjee	Sharat Pujari, Meenati		
