= List of Odia films of 1953 =

This is a list of films produced by the Ollywood film industry based in Cuttack in 1953:

== A-Z ==
Title	Director	Cast	Genre	Notes
1953
ଆମରି ଗାଁ ଝୁଅ; Amari Gaan Jhua	Binaya Banarjee	Gaur Ghosh, Chapala, Gopal Banarjee	Drama	
