= Samaya (film) =

Samay
- Directed by: Ganesh Mahapatra
- Produced by: Ganaesh Mahapatra
- Starring: Shriram Panda; Prashanta Nanda; Tripura Misra; Dhir Biswal; George Tiadi
- Music by: Hariprasad Chaurasia; Bhubaneswar Mishra (as Bhuban-Hari)
- Release date: 1975
- Country: India
- Language: Odia

Samay is a 1975 Indian Odia film directed by Ganesh Mahapatra. The movie stars Shriram Panda, Prashanta Nanda, Tripura Misra, Dhir Biswal and George Tiadi in the leading roles. For the first time in the history of Odia film, some parts of this film are in colour.

== Plot ==
A newly-wed Odia couple's life is disrupted when the husband is overcome with amnesia. The wife gets sympathy from a doctor friend, but the relationship is misunderstood and ridiculed by others, including the doctor's Bombay-born wife who gets involved with another good-for-nothing Bombayite.
