= Manasi (film) =

- Directed by: Malay Mitra
- Written by: Bimal Sadhu
- Screenplay by: Malay Mitra
- Produced by: Jayant Kumar
- Starring: Sriram Panda; Tripura Misra; Saudamini Misra; Swarup Naik; Samuel Sahul
- Cinematography: Ashu Dutt
- Music by: Prafulla Kar
- Production company: Abhiyatrik Productions
- Release date: 27 November 1981
- Running time: 148 min
- Country: India
- Language: Odia

Manasi is a 1981 romantic comedy Oriya film directed by Malay Mitra.

== Plot ==
Akash (Sriram Panda) is the son of industrialist Surendra Das and looks after his father's business. He and Prashant (Swarup Naik), who is an engineer by profession are close friends. One day Akash's family visit Seema's (Saudamini Misra) family at a function held by Seema's father. Seema mistaken Akash as a driver and Prashant as Akash. Seema's friend Surekha falls in love with Prashant alias Akash. Eventually Seema falls in love with Akash alias the driver. Situation becomes tense, when Akash's family want the marriage of Akash with Seema. At last the confusion is resolved and Seema finds out the identity of the driver and pseudo Akash is Prashant.

== Cast ==
- Sriram Panda....Akash
- Saudamini Misra... Seema
- Tripura Misra .... Surekha
- Swarup Naik ..... Prashant
- Samuel Sahu ..... Surendra Das
- Geeta Rao.... Akash's mother
- Radha Panda ...Banchanidhi
- Shyamalendu Bhatacharjee... Servant
- Drulabh Singh ... Seema's father

== Soundtrack ==
Track	Song	Singer(s)	Composer	lyric
1	Kie Se Priya Kahin Prema	Debasis Mahapatra	Prafulla Kar	Gokulananda Panda
2	Hey Bhagate Arey Mun Geeta Gaibi Tikie	Prafulla Kar	Prafulla Kar	Prafulla Kar
