= List of Odia films of 1961 =

This is a list of films produced by the Ollywood film industry based in Cuttack in 1961:

== A-Z ==
Title	Director	Cast	Genre	Notes
1961
ପରିଣାମ; Parinama	Biswanath Nayak	Pramod Panigrahi, Gitisudha	Social	
