= List of Odia films of 1951 =

This is a list of films produced by the Ollywood film industry based in Cuttack in 1951:

== A-Z ==
| Title | Director | Cast | Genre | Notes |
|---|---|---|---|---|
1951
| Rolls – 28 | Kalyan Gupta | Bimala Debi, Kishori Debi, Giridhari | | Fourth Oriya film in release and the first Oriya film with an English name. |
