= List of Odia films of 2020 =

This is a list of Odia films that are released in 2020.

List of Odia films produced in the Ollywood in India that are released in the year 2020.

== Films ==
#	Title	Director	Cast	Release date	Ref
1	Mun Paradeshi Chadhei	K. Murali Krishna	Ardhendu Sahu, Anubha Sourya, Mihir Das, Puspa Panda	10 January	
2	Babu Bhaijan	Tapas Saragharia	Arindam Roy, Shivani Sangita, Babi Mishra, Samaresh Routray	12 January	
3	Queen	Mrutyunjay Sahoo	Varsha Priyadarshini, Jayjit Das, Lipsa Mishra, Harihar Mohapatra	15 January	
4	Sala Budhar Badla	Sabyasachi Mohapatra	Atal Bihari Panda, Chandan Singh, Lochan Bag	17 January	
5	Adrushyam	Rajendra Mahanta	Shanu, Ankita, Chitta Ranjan Tripathy, Samaresh Routray, Lipsa Mishra	31 January	
6	Dahara Toka	Debu Patnaik, Sritam Das	Lipsa Mishra, Babi Mishra, Pradyumna Lenka, Priyanka Patnaik	9 February	
7	Golmaal	Ashwini Garnayak	Sidhant Mohapatra, Anisha Sharma, Chitta Tripathy, Babi Mishra	8 March	
8	Anu Didi Not Out	Tapas Saragharia	Anu Choudhury, Aman, Tanushree, Bijayini	8 March	
9	Moosha Mora Rajanikant	Sanjay Nayak	Lipika Senapati, Karan, Abhijit, Ashrumochan Mohanty, Biju Badajena	14 June	
10	Mu Tume Lockdown	Dwipayan Majumdar	Deepika Tripathy, Biswabhushan Panda	14 June	
11	Paika Bidroha	NIschay Rout	Samaresh Routray, Manoj Mishra, Shakti Baral, Priya Mishra	14 August	
12	Pheria	Mihir Ranjan Acharya	Pritiraj Shatapathy, Jina Samal, Debidutta Pradhan, Jayanta Santara	15 August	
13	Anguru na Milile Khata	Ashwini Garnayak	Debasish Patra, Ankita Mohanty, Pupindar Singh, Pintu Nanda	30 August	
14	Mo Mummy Papanka Bahaghara	Rajesh Mohanty	Sai Yashobanta, Cookies Swain, Ananta Mishra	6 September	
15	Lucky Ra Lock Down Love Story	Ashok Pati	Sabyasachi Mishra, Tamanna Vyas, Babi Mishra, Papu Pom Pom	18 October	
16	Prema Na Pagalapana	Ashwini Garnayak	Akash Dasnayak, Lipsa Mishra, Kuna Tripathy, Raimohan	18 October	
17	Durgatinashini	Raja Dash	Archita Sahu, Jiban Panda, Partya Sarathi Ray	15 November	
18	Charitra	Shishir Kumar Sahu, Pinaki Singh	Gargi Mohanty, Ananya Mishra, Hara Rath, Partha Sarathi Ray, Dwipanwit Dash Mohapatra	25 December	
19	Love You Priya	Vivek Kumar	Soham Singh, Mahima Das, Puspa Panda, Pritiraj Satapathy	27 December	
20	Tike Love Tike Twist	S.K. Muralidhran	Sambit Acharya, Punam Mishra, Mihir Das, Samaresh Routray	27 December	
21	Tu Mora Sathire	Raja D.	Sailendra Samantaray, Dibya Mohanty, Ashrumochan Mohanty, Trupti Sinha	27 December	
