= List of Odia films of 1971 =

A list of films produced by the Ollywood film industry based in Bhubaneshwar and Cuttack in 1971:

== A-Z ==
Title	Director	Cast	Genre	Notes	Source	CBFC
1971
Sansaar	Gour Ghose, Parbati Ghose	Gour Ghose, Chapala / Parbati Ghose		Parbati Ghose was the first female filmmaker of Odisha		U
