= List of Odia films of 1970 =

This is a list of films produced by the Ollywood film industry based in Bhubaneshwar and Cuttack in 1970:

== A-Z ==
Title	Director	Cast	Genre	Notes	Source	CBFC
1970
Adina Megha	Amit Mitra	Prashanta Nanda, Jharana Das, Sandhya				U
