= Lubeidak =

- Directed by: Ashok Mishra; Padmalochan Das
- Written by: Ashok Mishra
- Produced by: Sushanta Kumar Adhikari
- Cinematography: Niranjan Dasa
- Music by: Satya Narayan Adhikari
- Production company: Lopamudra Productions
- Release date: 1994
- Running time: 95 minutes
- Country: India
- Language: Oriya/Desiya

Lubeidak (English: The Necklace) is a 1994 Oriya/Desiya drama film, written and directed by Ashok Mishra and produced by Sushanta Kumar Adhikari under the banner of Lopamudra Productions of Jeypore as the first of its kind covering the Bonda people.

== Plot ==
The film is the story of Sania, the Bondo boy who won a national award in archery and inspired the producer and author of this project.

Lubeidak in the Bondo language means necklace. The Bondo tribe is considered one of the most primitive tribes of India, and, with its variety of sociocultural and anthropological appeal, has been depicted in this film. Mainstream civilized society has its own misnomers on the primitive tribe: the most prevalent one is that they are very wild and against the utsiders—anyone who doesn't belong to their race. But they call themselves remo, meaning human being. They have inbuilt capabilities which need to be channeled.

== Cast ==
- Premalata Das
- Hanu Dulari
- Naba Panda
- Rabi Panda
- Satya Mishra
- Rajendra Hanu Dulari
- Sujata Achary
- Manju Santra
- Gupteswar Panigrahi
- Raja
- Kamakshi Nayak
- Ramesh Panigrahi
- Nabakishore Bhatra
- Prabhudan Bhatra
- Rajat Kumar Biswsi
- Siba Prasad Nag
- Damburu
- Gobardhan Panda
- Dilip Kumar Samantray
- Abdul Kader
- Gopalkrishna Samantray
- Rabiprasad Patra
- Aji

== Recognition ==
This film won five awards in various categories at the 1994 Kerala State Film Awards. Padmalochan Das and Ashok Mishra won for best director; Sushanta Kumar Adhikari won the Mohan Das Goswami Award for best producer of a feature film; and Niranjan Das won for best cinematography. The other two film awards won were for best sound recording and best art direction.
