= Rajdeep =

Rajdeep is a name. People with the name include:

- Rajdeep Sardesai
- Rajdeep Roy
- Rajdeep Gupta
- Rajdeep Chatterjee
- Rajdeep Naik
- Rajdeep Goala
- Rajdeep Grewal
- Rajdeep Dasgupta
- Rajdeep Darbar
- Rajdeep Phogat
- Abhiraj Rajdeep Singh
