= Ajit Das =

Indian actor (1949–2020)

- Born: 20 January 1949; Karanjia, Odisha, India
- Died: 13 September 2020 (aged 71); Bhubaneswar, Odisha, India
- Occupations: Actor, director, playwright
- Years active: 1976–2020
- Spouse: Maya Das

Ajit Das (20 January 1949 – 13 September 2020) was an Indian actor, director and playwright. He started acting in Ollywood with the Odia film Sindura Bindu. He received the moniker Hakim Babu from the film of the same name.

== Biography ==
He was born on 20 January 1949, in Karanjia, Mayurbhanj district, Odisha. Ajit has been involved in drama since he was a child. His grandfather Sudhir Chandra Das was a playwright and he had a play troupe in Mayurbhanj. While there, he became interested in acting.

== Career ==
Das started working in the world of Ollywood through the film Sindura Bindu, set in the 16th century. He played the villain in the film, which was directed by Dhir Bishwal. Since then, he has acted in many Odia films as a hero and character actor. In addition to feature films, Ajit has also acted in Doordarshan and Manch Natak.

== Death ==
Das died on 13 September 2020, from COVID-19-related issues during the pandemic in India.

== Partial filmography ==
- Sindura Bindu (1976)
- Punar Milana (1977)
- Sesha Pratikhya (1979)
- Megha Mukti
- Devajani
- Bata Abata
- Ashara Akasha
- Hakim Babu (1985)
