= Sriram Panda =

Indian actor

- Born: 1954 (age 71–72); Nabarangpur, Odisha
- Other name: Swami Nitya Chaitanya
- Occupations: Actor; director; screenplay writer; yoga preacher
- Years active: 1972–1994
- Spouse: Tripura Misra (1976 - present)

Sriram Panda (Odia: ଶ୍ରୀରାମ ପଣ୍ଡା, born c. 1954) is an Indian actor, director and a screenplay writer of Ollywood industry, hailing from the Nabarangpur district, Odisha, India. He is widely known for his natural acting, gentle dialogue delivery and his discipline. Also he is formally known for his dashing look considering him as a replica of the first Indian superstar Rajesh Khanna among the Ollywood industry.

== Career ==
Sriram Panda first role was in Dhir Biswal's Dharitri, directed by Nitai Palit, in 1972. Panda was a favorite of audiences in the 1970s and 1980s.

In 1975 he starred in the lead role of Jajabara directed by Trimurti which was a huge hit and is still regarded as one of the classic films to be ever made in Odia film industry. A coloured version of Jajabara was later released which garnered high popularity among the masses. In 1976 he starred in six films, four of which were commercially successful.

He wrote, directed, and produced the movie Kurukshetra in 1988. Tripura Panda is also listed as a producer for the film.

In 1992, Panda left Ollywood and joined the Bihar School of Yoga. He took the name Swami Nitya Chaitanya.

== Filmography ==
Year	Film	Supporting actor/actress	Director/producer	Notes	Ref.
1972	Dharitri	Prashanta Nanda, Dhir Biswal	Nitai Palit / Dhir Biswal		
1975	Jajabara	Banaja Mohanty, Jairam Samal, Hemanta Das shyamalendu	Trimurty		
1976	Rakta Golapa	Banaja Mohanty			
1976	Naga Phasa	Prashanta Nanda, Malvika Roy, Bijay Mohanty, Jairam Samal	Basant Nayak		
1976	Samaya	Prashanta Nanda, Tripura Misra	Ganesh Mahapatra Nela Mohapatra	First technicolor movie in Odia	
1976	Sindura Bindu	Prashanta Nanda, Tripura Misra, Dhir Biswal, Sujata Ananda	Sisir Misra		
1976	Manasi	Tripura Misra, Saudamini Misra	Malay Mitra		
1976	Priyatama	Mahasweta Roy	Biswajeet Das		
1976	Jhilmil	Mahasweta Roy	K.H.D. Rao		
1976	Janmadata	Mahasweta Roy	K.H.D. Rao		
1979	Subarna Sita	Tripura Misra	Sisir Misra		
1981	Samay Bada Balawan	Bijay Mohanty, Uttam Mohanty, Mahasweta Roy, Roja Ramani	Sisir Misra		
1982	Hisab Nikas	Prashanta Nanda, Mahasweta Roy, Deepa Sahu	Prashanta Nanda	First Cinemascope movie in Odia	
1982	Dekh Khabar Rakh Nazar	Uttam Mohanty, Sujata	Kumar Anand	He played a negative role in this movie	
1982	Swapna Sagar	Prashanta Nanda, Mahasweta Roy, Anita Das	Prashanta Nanda	First 70mm movie in Odia	
1982	Jaga Balia	Prashanta Nanda, Mahasweta Roy, Bijaya Jena	Prashanta Nanda		
1982	Sankha Sindur	Uttam Mohanty, Aparajita Mohanty	Bijoy Bhaskar		
1982	Mu Tume O Se	Sujata Anand	Kumar Anand		
1983	Dora	Prashanta Nanda, Mahasweta Roy	Prashanta Nanda		
1983	Kaberi	Mahasweta Roy	Govind Tej		
1983	Gruha Lakshmi	Mahasweta Roy	C.S.R. Rao		
1984	Eai Aama Sansar	Tandra Roy	Sisir Misra		
1984	Sapan Banik	Dipti Nath	P.D.Shenoy		
1984	Hira Nila	Prashanta Nanda, Bijaya Jena	Prashanta Nanda		
1985	Badhu Nirupama	Aparajita Mohanty, Uttam Mohanty, Radha Panda	Jugal Devta		
1985	Manini	Rameswari	K.S. Sethumadhavan		
1986	Jor Jar Mulak Tar	Baisali Parida	Raju Misra		
1987	Bhuli Huena	Rameswari	Bijay Mohanty		
1987	Anyaya Sahibi Nahin	Uttam Mohanty, Sehnaaz	Ashok Sharma		
1987	Micha Mayara Sansar		Udaya Sankar Pani		
1987	Sankha Mahuri	Mahasweta Roy	Akshya Mohanty/R.G. Gope		
1987	Suna Sansar	Babi, Niharika	Sisir Misra		
1987	Akashara Aakhi		Pankaj Pani		
1989	Asuchi Mo Kalia Suna		Raju Misra		
1989	Mamata Ra Dori	Aparajita Mohanty	Mahamad Mohsin		
1989	Puja	Prashanta Nanda, Mahasweta Roy	Prashanta Nanda		
1989	Loot Taraz	Ranjit, Pratibha Sahu	Prashanta Nanda		
1990	Nyaya Anyaya	Uttam Mohanty	Jayanta	He played a double role	
1990	Hisab Kariba Kalia		Sumant Dey		
1991	To Binu Anya Gati Nahi		Mahamad Mohsin		
1991	Kandhei	Prashanta Nanda, Mahasweta Roy	Prashanta Nanda		
1992	Ghara Mora Swarga	Tandra Ray, Mihir Das, Bijay Mohanty	Jayanta		
1994	Mahua	Snigdha Mohanty	Harish Mohanty	His last movie, released in 1994	
