= Jayiram Samal =

Odia actor

Jairam Samal (Jayee)
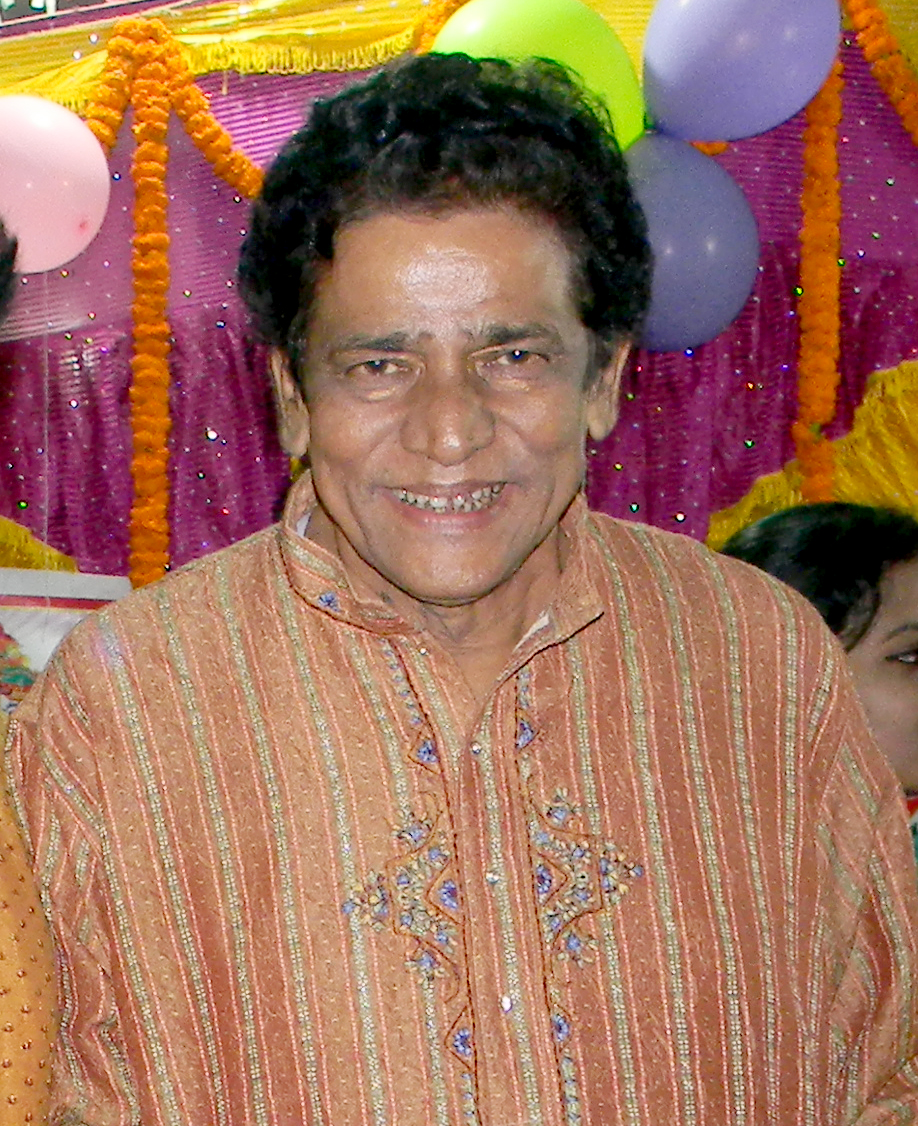
- Born: 1948 (age 77–78); Mahanga, Orissa, India
- Occupations: Actor, Model
- Years active: 1975-present

Jayiram Samal^{[Note]} (born 1948), also known as Jayee, is an India actor known for his comic roles in Odia cinema (Ollywood). He is accredited in over 300 works, including films, television serials, and plays. He started his career in the 1970s as a comic actor. He was known for his trademark laugh. He has also appeared in negative roles in some films.

In 2008, Samal was presented with a Lifetime Achievement award at the 40th Banichitra Awards presented by the Banichitra film magazine along with singer Raghunath Panigrahi.

== Filmography ==
- 2013 Om Sai Tujhe Salaam
- 2002 Sindura Nuhein Khela Ghara
- 1997 Sabitree
- 1996 Jeevan Saathi
- 1994 Gadhi Janile Ghara Sundar
- 1992 Anti Churi Tanti Kate
- 1988 Thili Jhia Heli Bohu
- 1987 Jor Jaar Mulak Taar
- 1987 Tunda Baaida
- 1985 Hakim Babu
- 1985 Jaga Hatare Pagha
- 1984 Jaaiphula
- 1984 Jaga Balia
- 1984 Janani
- 1984 Pratidhwani
- 1983 Jheeati Sita Pari
- 1983 Kaberi
- 1983 Swapna Sagara
- 1982 Basanti Apa
- 1982 Mu O Se Tume
- 1981 Arati
- 1981 Bilwa Mangala
- 1981 Maana Abhiman
- 1980 Danda Balunga
- 1979 Sautuni
- 1978 Balidan
- 1978 Janmadata
- 1978 Pati Patni
- 1977 Naga Phasa
- 1977 Ae Nuhen Kahani
- 1976 Krishna Sudama
- 1975 Jajabara

== Notes ==
^{^[Note]}Also credited as Jairam or Jayaram.
