= Tandra Ray =

Indian actress

- Occupations: Actress, Model
- Years active: 1977–present
- Spouse: Bijay Mohanty (m. 1978–2020)

Tandra Ray is an Indian actress in the Odia film industry. She worked in Odia-language films during the 1980s and 1990s. She is married to Bijay Mohanty. Her first film was Chilika Teerey opposite Bijay Mohanty.

== Filmography ==
Year	Films	Notes
2013	Haata Dhari Chaaluthaa	
2013	Daha Balunga	
2010	Sasura Ghara Zindabad	
2010	Dil Tate Deichi	
2010	Subha Vivaha	
2009	Love Dot Com	
2007	Lal Tuku Tuku Sadhaba Bahu	
2007	Mahanayak	
2007	Mu Tate Love Karuchi	
2005	I Love You	
2001	Dharma Debata	
2000	Babu Parsuram	
1999	Jai Sriram	
1998	Sahara Jaluchi	
1997	Raghu Arakhita	
1997	Ram Laxman	
1996	Vasudha	
1994	Bhai Hela Bhagari	
1994	Sakhi Rahila Ae Singha Duara	
1993	Bhagya Hate Dori	
1993	Mo Bhai Jaga	
1992	Ghara Mora Swarga	
1992	Panjuri Bhitare Sari	
1991	Aama Ghara Aama Sansara	
1991	Kotia Manish Gotiye Jaga	
1990	Ama Ghara	
1990	Maa Mate Shakti De	
1989	Mamata Ra Dori	
1989	Sagar	
1989	Topaye Sindura Dipata Shankha	
1988	Papa Punya	
1988	Pua Mora Kala Thakura	
1987	Micha Mayara Sansar	
1986	Ei Aama Sansar	
1986	Manika	
1986	Sansara	
1985	Mamata Mage Mula	
1985	Nala Damayanti	
1985	Palataka	
1985	Para Jhia Ghara Bhangena	
1985	Sata Kebe Luchi Rahena	
1982	Basanti Apa	
1981	Arati	
1980	Alibha Daga	
1980	Ram Balram	
1979	Sautuni	
1978	Samarpana	
1978	Pipasha	
1978	Pati Patni	
1977	Chilika Teerey	
