= Hara Patnaik =

Film Director

Hara Pattanaik
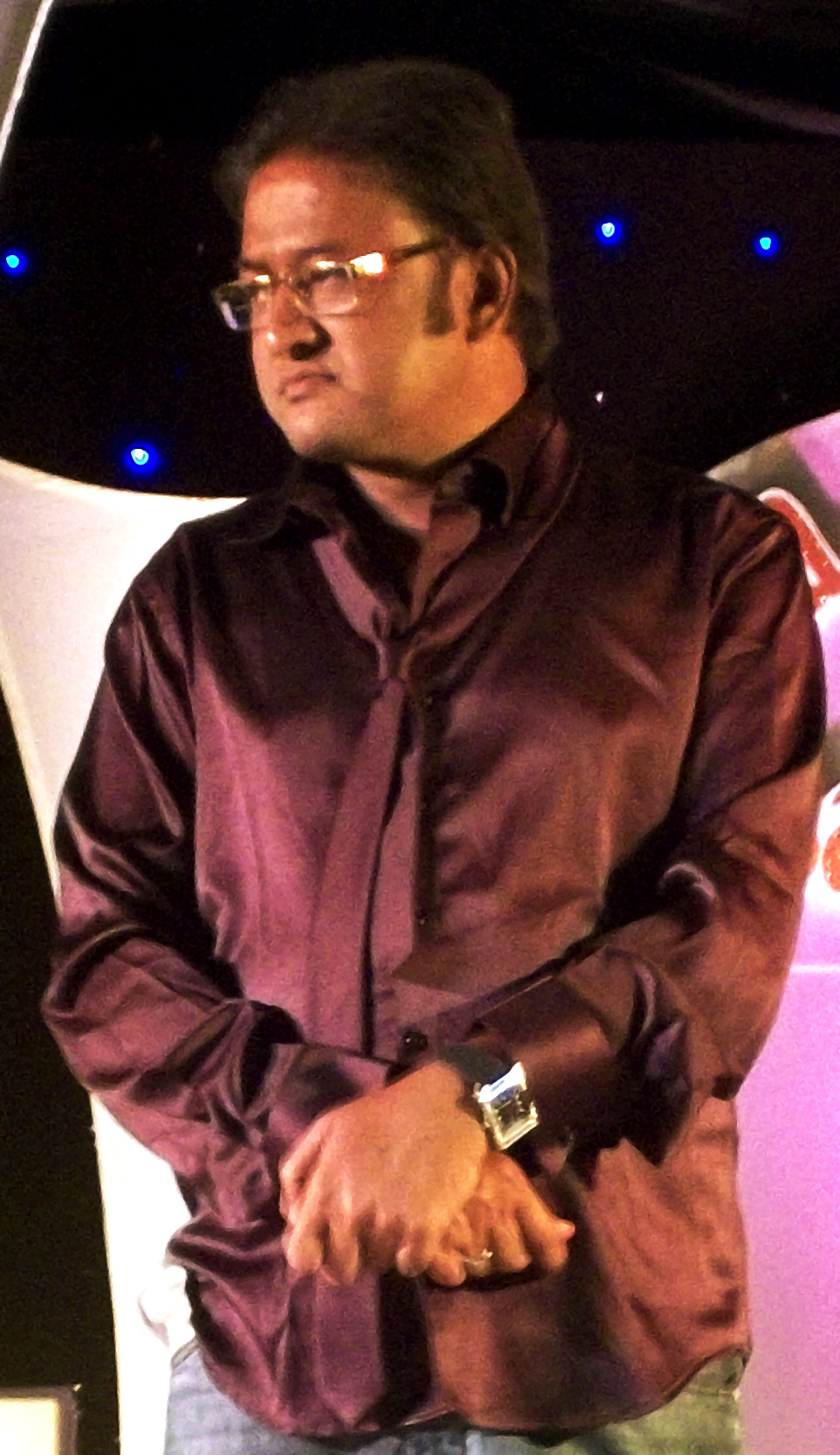
- Hara Pattanaik
- Born: 12 October 1958; Cuttack, India
- Died: 13 January 2015 (aged 56); Bhubaneswar, Odisha, India
- Other name: Hari Patnaik
- Occupations: Actor, director, screenplay writer, singer
- Years active: 1977–2013
- Spouse: Jharana Pattanaik

Hara Pattanaik (12 October 1958 – 13 January 2015), also known as Hari Patnaik, was an Indian actor, director and screenplay writer known for his works in Odia cinema. He has acted over 60 Odia-language movies and directed about 19 others. Pattanaik was instrumental in introducing other actors including Anubhav Mohanty, Sabyasachi Mishra and Babushaan. He died of cancer on 13 January 2015.

== Awards and accreditation ==
During his 20 years tenure, he got several state-level awards and accreditation from media and Oriya cine public at large.

== Filmography ==
As Actor

1. Jivan Sangram (1984) (his first movie as actor)
2. Sahari Bagha (1985)
3. Jor Jaar Mulak Tar (1986)
4. Suna Chadhei (1987)
5. Chaka Aakhi Sabu Dekhuchi (1987)
6. Jahaku Rakhibe Ananta (1988)
7. Asuchi Mo Kalia Suna (1989)
8. Daiba Daudi (1990)
9. Kapala Likhana (1991)
10. Ghara Mora Swarga (1992)
11. Panjuri Bhitare Sari (1992)
12. Anti Churi Tanti Kate (1992)
13. Baadshah (1992)
14. Rakhile Siba Mariba Kie (1994)
15. Suna Panjuri (1995)
16. Suhaga Sindura (1996)
17. Ram Laxman (1997)
18. Nari Bi Pindhipare Rakta Sindura (1997)
19. Ganga Jamuna (1997)
20. Stree (1998)
21. Sahara Jaluchi (1998)
22. Aie Sangharsha (1998)
23. Paradesi Babu (1999)
24. Katha Kahiba Mo Matha Sindoor (1999)
25. Kalki Abatar (1999)
26. Kala Chakra (1999)
27. Mo Kola To Jhulana (2001)
28. Dharma Debata (2001)
29. Sindura Nuhein Khela Ghara (2002)
30. Je Panche Para Manda (2003)
31. Saathire (2004)
32. Barsa My Darling (2004)
33. Mastan (2004)
34. Arjun (2005)
35. Agni Parikshya (2005)
36. Thank You Bhagban (2006)
37. Tulkalam (2007)
38. Pagala Premi (2007)
39. Chaati Chiri Dele Tu.. (2008)
40. Mr. Funtoosh (2008)
41. Kurukshetra (2009)
42. To Akhire Mun (2010)
43. Omm Sai Ram (2012)

As Director

1. Daiba Daudi (1990)
2. Kapala Likhana (1991)
3. Bhagya Hate Dori (1993)
4. Yashoda (1996)
5. Suhaga Sindura (1996)
6. Pua Mora Bhola Sankara (1996)
7. Nari Bi Pindhipare Rakta Sindura (1997)
8. Ganga Jamuna (1997)
9. Paradesi Babu (1999)
10. Kalki Abatar (1999)
11. Ae Jugara Krushna Sudama (2003)
12. Saathire (2004)
13. Barsa My Darling (2004)
14. I Love You (2004)
15. Arjun (2005)
16. Thank You Bhagban (2006)
17. Pagala Premi (2007)
18. Pagal Premi (2007) (Bengali)
19. Romeo – The Lover Boy (2009)
20. Omm Sai Ram (2012)
