= Sarat Pujari =

Indian actor

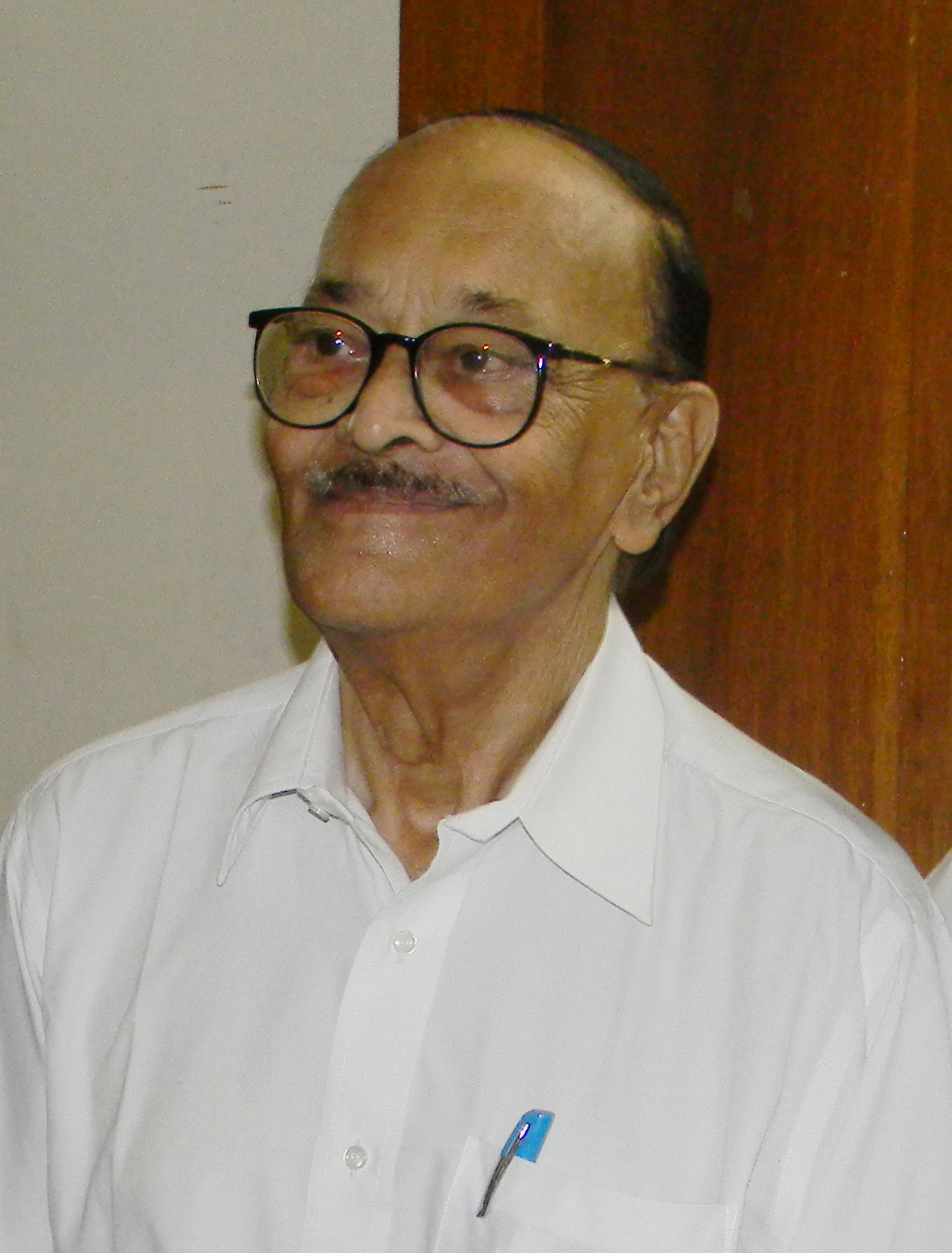
- Pujari in October 2012
- Born: 8 August 1934; Nayagarh, Orissa, British India
- Died: 12 May 2014 (aged 79); Bhubaneswar, Odisha, India
- Education: Post graduation in Economics, Diploma in Paintings
- Occupations: Actor, Director, Producer
- Years active: 1963–2012
- Children: Two Daughters And Two Sons

Sarat Pujari (8 August 1934 – 12 May 2014) was an Indian actor, director and producer in Odia film industry (Ollywood). He was originally from Jhaduapada, Sambalpur.

== Early life and background ==
Sarat Pujari was born on 8 August 1934 at Khandapada, Nayagarh district, Odisha. His early education was completed in many schools all over Odisha. He completed his post graduation in Economics and Diploma in Paintings in Allahabad University in 1956.

== Career ==
After completing his education, he started his career as a block designer and publicity agent. In 1959, he joined as a lecturer in economics in Panchayat College, Bargarh which he quit in 1966. Then, he joined Tapang Light Foundry, Nayagarh as a Works Manager. For so many years he worked as the Principal of Larambha College, Larambha.

=== Film career ===
He started his career as an actor in the sixties. He left service and became a freelance film actor from September 1966 to September 1968 to learn the technique of film-making. After that, he was principal at the young age of 34 in Larambha College, Bargarh. Pujari was nominated by the State Govt. of Odisha as member of the Orissa Sangeeta Natak Academy, Member of the Board of Director of Film Development Corporation of Odisha, Cuttack. He retired as a principal of Sangeet Nataka college, Bhubaneswar.

Pujari became very interested in drama and other performing arts during his time as a student. At that time the Oriya film industry was not as developed as it is today, producing no more than one film each year. At that time he was offered a role in film Laxmi puja. At one point Pujari was the star of the Oriya film industry. He has acted in about 40 films, as well as some television serials. He has also directed a few Oriya films, including Tapoi and Ashanta Graha.

The Government of Odisha conferred upon him the "Jayadev Award of 1985" for his significant contribution to Oriya Film Industry. He was also honored with first Hemant Das Kala Samman Award, Kadambini Samman Awards for 2010 & Guru Kelucharan Mohapatra Award for the year 2007. Now he occasionally acts in films and television soap operas. He also played a negative role in the International award-winning movie called Bhukha in (1989).

== Personal life and death ==
On 12 May 2014, he suffered a cardiac arrest at around 12:30 AM and died at his house in Bhubaneshwar. He is survived by his wife, two daughters and two sons. His son Soumen Pujari is also an actor.

== Filmography ==
- Jiban Sathi (1963) – Sarat
- Matira Manisha (1966) – Baraju
- Kaa (1966)
- Arundhati (1967) – Manoj
- Tapoi (1978) – Director
- Ashanta Graha (1982) SARAT – Director
- Astaraga (1982) – Director
- Andha Diganta (1988)
- Bhukha (1989)
- Drusti (1990)
- Aranya Rodan (1992)
- Aranyaka – Raja Saheb
- Shesha Drushti (1997) – Kedar Babu

== Awards ==
- Orissa Cine Artist Association Award (2012)
- Hemanta Das Kala Samman, 2011
