= Mahasweta Ray =

Indian Odia actress

Mahashweta Ray
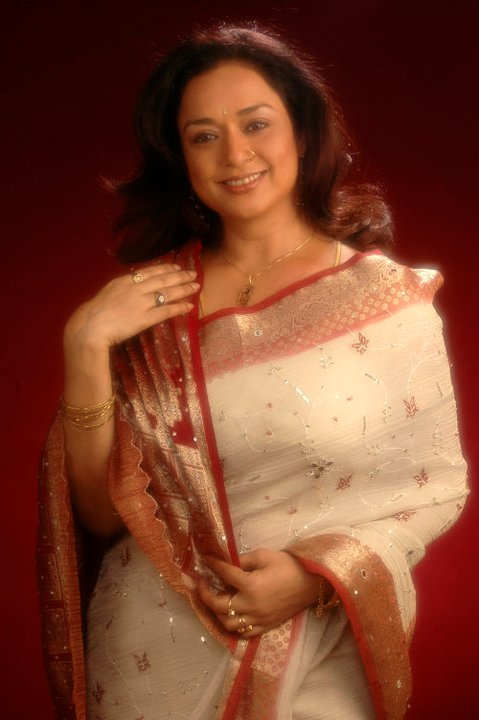
- Born: 2 July 1962 (age 64); Puri, Orissa, India
- Occupations: Actress; Politician
- Years active: 1975–present
- Political party: Bharatiya Janata Party (2018–present)
- Spouse: Sirish Routray
- Parent: Rajkishore Ray
- Relatives: Aparajita Mohanty (cousin); Uttam Mohanty (cousin in law); Babushan Mohanty (nephew); Buddhaditya Mohanty (nephew)

Mahasweta Ray is an Indian actress, television personality and politician who is known for her work in Odia films and soap operas. Her numerous accolades include record 8 Odisha State Film Awards.

== Biography ==
She was born to Indian writer Rajkishore Ray. She has a sister named Malavika Ray. Aparajita Mohanty is her cousin sister. In the initial years she had had limited exposure to cinema before she started a career in film. She worked on a majority of the films by Sisir Mishra, including many box office successes. She is married to Sirish Routray and together the couple has a son named Rishi Routray.

She began her career while she was in her teens with the film titled Jhumka. In 1978, she made her Bollywood film debut through the film Priyatama.

Bengali films she worked on include Aranyer Adhikar (1998), Katha Chhilo (1994), Sajani Go Sajani (1991), Sujan Sakhi (1995) and Nyayachakra (1991). She won state awards for acting in Kaberi (1983), Pooja (1981), and Gouri (1979).

She is actively associated with the Oriya film industry, doing some character roles and some tele-serials.

== Political career ==
In February 2018, Ray joined the Bharatiya Janata Party.

== Filmography ==
- Chumki My Darling (2021)
- Jaga Hatare Pagha (2015)
- Lekhu Lekhu Lekhi Deli (2014)
- Hata Dhari Chalutha (2013)
- Mu Eka Tumara (2013)
- Superstar (2013)
- Target (2012)
- Raja Jhia Sathe Heigala Bhaba (2011)
- Kemiti a Bandhan (2010)
- Tu Thile Mo Dara Kahaku (2007)
- Mo Suna Pua (2003)
- Sabata Maa (2000)
- Bou (1998)
- Gopa Re Badhhuchhi Kala Kanhei (1995)
- Chamatkar (Sony TV) (1994)
- Kula Nandan (1994)
- Kothachilo (1994)(Bengali)
- Akuha Katha (1994)
- Suna Bhauja (1993)
- Bhagya Hate Doro (1992)
- Agni Sanket (1992)
- Ghara Mora Swarga (1992)
- Mukti Tirtha (1992)
- Kandhei (1990)
- Jaa Devi Sarva Bhuteshu (1990)
- Nyayachakra(1990) (Bengali)
- Panchu Pandav (1989)
- Golamgiri (1987)
- Bagula Baguli (1987)
- Paka Kambal Pot Chhata (1986)
- Gruhalakshmi (1985)
- Samay Bada Balwan (1982)
- Dora (1984)
- Hira Nila (1984)
- Jaga Balia (1984)
- Kaberi (1983)
- Kalyani (1983)
- Swapna Sagara (1983)
- Ashanta Graha (1982)
- Hisab Nikas (1982)
- Akshi Trutiya (1981)
- Pooja (1981)
- Seeta Raati (1981)
- Sei Sura (1981)
- Tike Hasa Tike Luha (1981)
- Baata Abaata (1980)
- Sajani Go Sajani (Bengali)
- Jai Maa Mangala (1980)
- Maa-o-Mamata (1980)
- Gauri (1979)
- Nijhum Rati Ra Saathi (1979)
- Sindura Bindu (1976)
- Janmadata (1978)
- Jhilimil (1978)
- Kabi Samrat Upendra Bhanja (1978)
- Priyatama (1978)
- Sankha Mahuri (1978)
- Sati Anasuya (1978)
- Pranam Kharedhu (22 SEP 1978)
- Ae Nuhen Kahani (1977)
- Hira Moti Manika (1976)
- Shesha Shrabana (1976)
- Jhumuka (1975)

== See also ==
- Prashanta Nanda
- National Film Awards
