= Sidhant Mohapatra =

Indian Odia film actor, politician (born 1966)

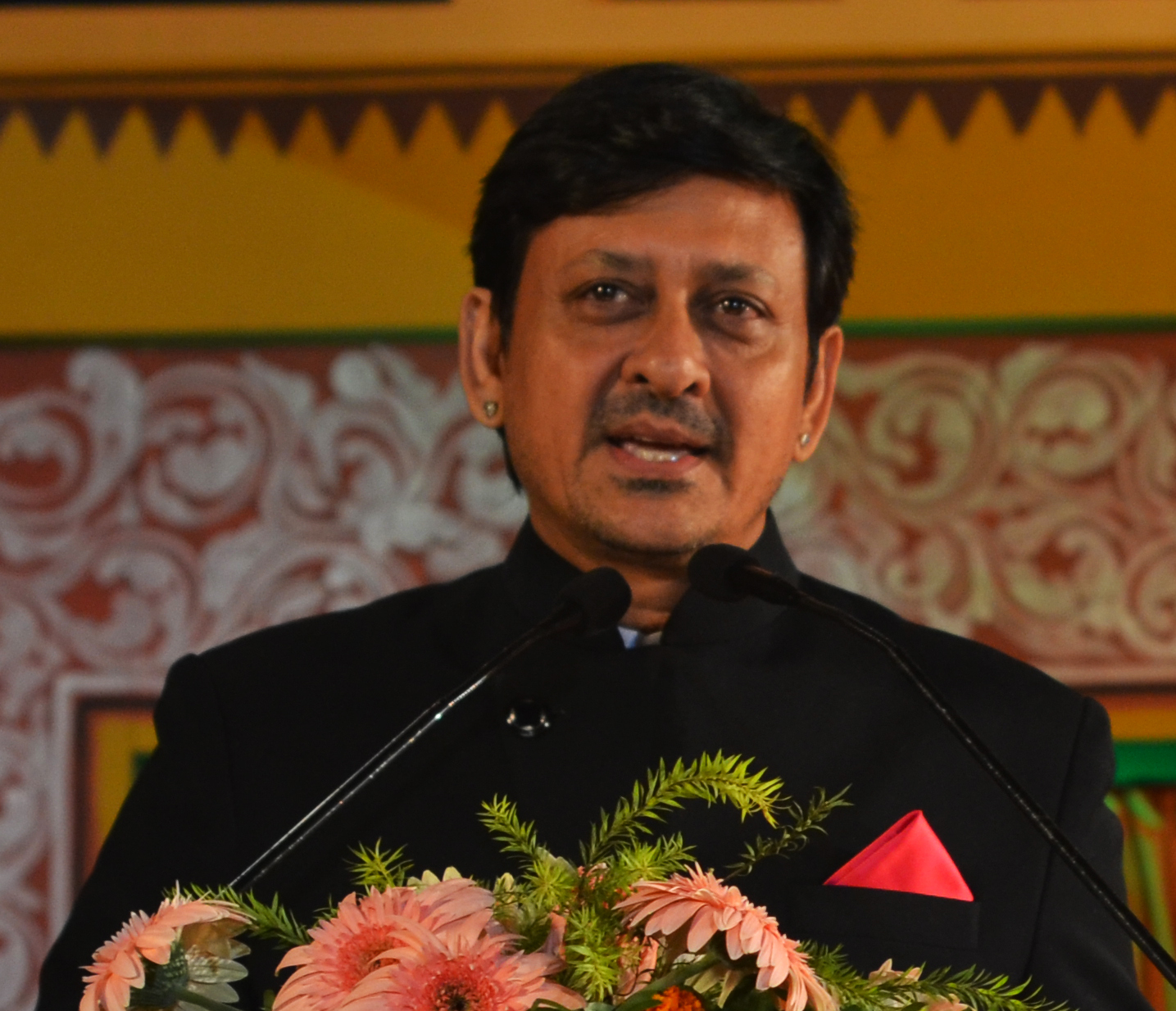
- Mohapatra speaking at the Odisha State Film Awards 2014

Member of Odisha Legislative Assembly
- Incumbent
- Assumed office 4 June 2024
- Constituency: Digpahandi

Member of Parliament, Lok Sabha
- In office 2009–2019
- Preceded by: Chandra Sekhar Sahu
- Succeeded by: Chandra Sekhar Sahu
- Constituency: Berhampur

Personal details
- Born: Gyana Ranjan Mohapatra; 4 May 1966 (age 60) Brahmapur, Odisha, India
- Party: Bharatiya Janata Party (2024–present)
- Other political affiliations: Biju Janata Dal (2009–2024)
- Spouses: Rachna Banerjee (m. 1994; div. 2004) Sanjeeta Mishra (m. 2012)
- Education: Dharanidhar University (B.Com); Institute of Marketing and Management, New Delhi (PGDM)
- Occupation: Actor; politician
- Nickname: Munna

Sidhant Mohapatra (born as Gyana Ranjan Mohapatra on 4 May 1966), popularly known as Munna Bhai, is an Indian actor and politician primarily working in Odia cinema. He has acted in over 300 films, with 280 of them in lead roles.

Mohapatra has won numerous awards, including seven consecutive Odisha State Film Awards from 2000 to 2006, a record for any actor. He has also won five Filmfare Awards East and two National Film Awards, for Kotiye Re Gotiye (2000) and Swayamsiddha (2010). In addition to his acting career, Mohapatra has produced and distributed 120 films through his production company, Omm Divya Vision Home Motion Picture, which he founded in 1992. He has been featured in Forbes India's Celebrity 100 list, based on his income.

== Early and personal life ==
Mohapatra was born as Gyana Ranjan Mohapatra in Brahmapur, Odisha to Kanak and Manmohan Mohapatra. He completed his early education at St. Vincent's Convent School, Brahmapur and his higher secondary and graduation in commerce from Dharanidhar Autonomous College, Keonjhar. Mohapatra completed his PGDM from Institute of Marketing and Management in New Delhi in 1989.

== Career ==
=== Acting ===
His debut film Sradhanjali was made in 1992.

=== Politics ===
He joined Biju Janata Dal in 2009 and successfully contested Berhampur constituency in the 2009 15th Lok Sabha election. Mohapatra was reelected in the 2014 general election by a margin of nearly 100,000 votes. However, he did not contest the constituency for a third term.

== Filmography ==
Films
Year	Film	Role	Ref.
1992	Sradhanjali	Bijaya Das	
1993	Pathara Khasuchi Bada Deulu	Muna	
1993	Mo Kanhu Re		
1993	Bhai Hela Bhagari	Rajesh	
1993	Lakhye Siva Puji Paichhi Pua	Vicky	
1994	Rana Bhumi	Surya Pradhan	
1994	Sakhi Rakhiba Mo Shankha Sindura	Saroj	
1994	Kala Manika	Partha	
1994	Rakhile Siba Mariba Kie	Abhijeet	
1994	Maa O Mamata	Muna	
1994	Sakhi Rahila ae Singhaduara	Rabi	
1995	Subhadra	Ajay Das	
1995	Suna Panjuri	Ajay	
1995	Mani Nageswari	Rajesh	
1995	Kula Nandan	Subhankar Choudhury	
1995	Sei Jhiati	Rajesh Mahaptra	
1996	Pua Mora Bhola Sankara	Kumar Rai	
1996	Yashoda	Sangram	
1996	Suhaga Sindura	Rajesh Choudhury / Raju	
1996	Laxmana Rekha	Nilambar Sahu	
1997	Bapa		
1997	Nari Bi Pindhipare Rakta Sindura	Rabi	
1997	Danab	Radesh	
1997	Asuchi Mo Kalia Raja		
1997	Suna Sansar	Raju	
1997	Ganga Jamuna	Raju	
1998	Soubhagyabati	Akash Choudhury	
1998	Bou	Deepak	
1998	Santana	Jitu Mahapatra	
1998	Sahara Jaluchi	Priyabrata Das	
1998	Aie Sangharsha		
1998	Dharma Nikiti	Aijay Patnaik / Raja	
1998	Kala Chakra		
1999	To Aakhi Mo Aaina	Amar Choudhury	
1999	Kalki Avatar	Rabi	
1999	Sarpanch Babu	Arjun Paikrai	
1999	Kie Pochhiba Maa Aakhi Ra Luha	Rajendra Das	
1999	Rakata chinhichhi Nijara Kia	Ajay	
1999	Sasu Hathakadi Bhauja Bedi	Bikas	
1999	Rakhi Bhijigala Akhi Luha re	Ajay	
1999	Pua Bhangi Dela Suna Sansara	Raja	
1999	Paradesi Babu	Raju	
1999	Krishna Kaberi	Nata	
1999	Kotikare Gotiye		
1999	Katha Kahiba Mo Matha Sindur		
1999	Baazi	Sahsank Das / Himanshu Choudhury	
1999	Ei Akhi Ama Sakhi		
1999	Suna Harini	Amar Choudhury	
2000	Maa Pari Kie Heba	Rajesh Das	
2000	Sindura Nuhe Khela Ghara	Raj Kishor Das	
2001	Dharma Debata	Chandra Prakash	
2001	Mo Kola To Jhulana	Sanjay Mahapatra	
2002	Samaya Chaka re Sansar Ratha	Amit Rautrai	
2002	Samaya Kheluchi Chaka Bhaunri		
2002	Annadata (Bengali)		
2002	Rahichhi Rahibi Tori Paen		
2002	Mana Rahigala Tumari Thare	Nanda Nandan Mahapatra	
2002	Maa Kande aji Puate Pain		
2002	Dharma Sahile Hela	Dipankar	
2002	Pua Mora Jagata Jita	Kanha Choudhury	
2003	Matrushakti	Satya	
2003	Aeithi Swarga Aeithi Narka	Ajay	
2003	Nari Akhire Nian		
2003	Vidhata	Akash Das	
2003	Rakata Kahiba Kie Kahara	Rahul / Raja	
2003	Sata Miccha		
2003	Sakala Tirtha To Charane		
2003	Je Panche Para Manda	Chintu	
2003	Bahudibe Mo Jaga Balia	Balaram / Hari	
2003	Pari Mahal		
2004	Katha Deithili Maa Ku	Ajay Patnaik	
2004	Rakhle Jadi Se Mariba Kie		
2004	Kandhei Akhire Luha	Abinash	
2005	Tate Mo Rana	Badal	
2005	Tu Mo Akhira Tara	Raju	
2005	Om Shanti Om	Abhimanyu Das	
2005	Topae Sindura Di Topa Luha	Raju	
2005	Dharma Ra Heba Jay	Ajaya Swain	
2005	Mo Mana Khali Tori Pain	Shakti	
2005	Babu I Love You	Jaganath	
2005	Agni Parikshya	Raja	
2006	Prema Rutu Asilare		
2006	Tu Eka Aama Saha Bharasa	Manoj	
2006	Shaashu Ghara Chaalijibi	Rakesh Rai	
2006	Rakhi Bandhili Mo Rakhiba Mana	Sameer	
2006	Rakate Lekhichi Naa	Ajay Mahapatra	
2006	De Maa Shakti De	Raju	
2006	Ziddi	Arjun	
2007	Rasika Nagar	Prem Kumar	
2007	Samaya Hatare Dori		
2007	Kalishankar		
2007	Nari Nuhen Tu Narayani	Partha Dash	
2007	To Pai nebi mu sahe janama		
2007	Dhauli Express		
2007	Chaka Chaka Bhaunri		
2008	Chhati Chiri Dele Tu		
2008	Bhagya Chakra	Raju	
2008	Nei ja re megha mote	Ajay	
2008	Bande Utkala Janani	Arun Sadangi	
2009	Mukhyamantri	Sekhar Das / Banku	
2009	Aseema: Beyond Boundaries	Choudhary Lalikant Patnayak	
2009	Tulsi (Bhojpuri)		
2009	Sindura	Krushna Samantrai	
2009	Suna Chadei Mo Rupa Chadei	Bijay	
2010	Swayamsiddha		
2010	Don		
2011	143 - I Love You	Ajay	
2011	Mote Bohu Kari Nei Ja		
2011	Eka Ekaa- Vision & Meandering Reflections	Omm	
2012	Eka Ekaa- Vision & Meandering Reflections 2	Raju	
2013	Mo Duniya Tu Hi Tu		
2013	Prema Sabuthu Balabaan	Major Karan Panda / Kalia	
2013	Hari Om Hari	Hari	
2013	Mu Raja Tu Rani	ACP Arya Kumar	
2013	Gaddbadd	Vicky	
2014	Akhire Akhire	Shiva	
2014	Golapi Golapi	Love Guru Prem	
2014	Sangam	Kabir Chadhury	
2014	Pagala Karichu Tu	Bagha	
2014	Ganja Ladhei	Bira Pratap Singh	
2015	Kie Daba Takkar	Bhavani Paikrai	
2015	Raghupati Raghaba Rajaram	Raghupati	
2015	Kehi nuhe Kahara		
2016	GodFather-True Story Of A Man		
2017	Bajrangi		
2019	Chhabirani -The Untold Story		
2019	This Is Maya Re Baya		
2021	Tandav	Narrator	
2022	Premam	Babu Venkatesh Rao	
2022	Pratikshya	Doctor	
2023	Toro Moro katti		
2023	Bapa Superman	Bharat Jena	
2023	Guddu Gangster	Gangster	
2023	Katak- Sesha Ru Aarambha		
2025	Shri Jagannath Nka Nabakalebara	Bisar Mohanty	

== Awards ==
List of Sidhant Mohapatra awards
Year	Award	Category	Film	Result	Ref.
1998	Odisha State Film Awards	Best Actor in Support role	Bou	Won	
2000	Odisha State Film Awards	Best Actor	Sindura Nuhe Khela Ghara	Won	
2001	Odisha State Film Awards	Best Actor	Mo Kola To Jhulana	Won	
2002	Odisha State Film Awards	Best Actor	Pua Mora Jagatjita	Won	
2003	Odisha State Film Awards	Best Actor	Aethi Swarga Aithi Narka	Won	
2004	Odisha State Film Awards	Best Actor	Om Santi Om	Won	
2005	Odisha State Film Awards	Best Actor	Shaashu Ghara Chaalijibi	Won	
2007	Filmfare Awards East	Best Actor And Best actor in Negative Role	Tu Mo Akhira Tara and Dhauli Express	Won	
2009	Filmfare Awards East	Best Oriya Actor	Kalishankar	Won	
2010	National Award	Best Actor	Swayamsiddha	Won	
2010	Filmfare Awards East	Best Actor	Pahili Raja	Won	
2011	Odisha State Film Awards	Best Actor	Eka Eka	Won	
2012	Filmfare Awards East	Best Actor	Cuttack The Silver City	Won	
