= Bijay Mohanty =

Indian actor (1950–2020)

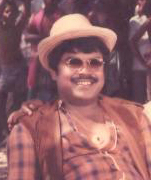
- Mohanty in the set of Sahari Bagha (1985)
- Born: 8 April 1950; Pandiri, Kendrapada, Odisha, India
- Died: 20 July 2020 (aged 70); Bhubaneswar, Odisha, India
- Education: National School of Drama
- Occupations: Actor; Politician
- Years active: 1977–2020
- Political party: Indian National Congress (2014–2018)
- Spouse: Tandra Ray
- Children: 1

Bijay Mohanty (8 April 1950 – 20 July 2020) was an Indian actor and politician who worked primarily in Odia Cinema. He starred in the film Chilika Teerey, which was honored a National Film Award.

== Personal life ==
Mohanty was born in 1950 in an aristocratic Karan family at Pandiri, Kendrapara and brought up in Baripada, Mayurbhanj, Odisha. He started acting during his school days while studying at M.K.C High School. After his graduation with BA, he joined the National School of Drama. He passed successfully from the NSD with classmates like Naseeruddin Shah, Raj Babbar, and Om Puri etc. He acted in the theatres and stayed in Delhi up to 1975. After returning to Odisha, he devoted himself to directing plays.

Bijay was married to Tandra Ray, an actress in the Odia film industry. The couple acted in a number of films opposite each other. They have one daughter.

== Career ==
In 1977, Mohanty started upon his career in the Oriya film industry with the film Chilika Teerey which won the National Award for that year. Initially, he opted mostly for negative roles. Naga Phasa, Samay Bada Balaban, Danda Balunga, Dora, Sahari Bagha, Chaka Bhaunri, and Chaka Akhi Sabu Dekhuchi are some of his most notable films as this type of character. He acted in almost every manner of roles available to him; ranging from hero, villain, and comedian to character roles etc. In every field he left his incomparable mark. Mohanty's other notable films include; Arati (1981), Jaga Hatare Pagha (1985),Mamata Mage Mula (1985), Aei Aama Sansara (1986), Aama Ghara Aama Sansara (1991), Ki Heba Sua Posile, Bhisma Pratigya (1993), Bhai Hela Bhagari (1994), Suna Panjuri (1995), Jeeban Sathi (1996), Laxman Rekha, Rakhi Bhijigala Akhi Luhare and I Love My India.

He also directed the movie Bhuli Huena (1987).

He joined the Drama department of the Utkal Sangeet Mahavidyalaya in 1977 and retired as a professor from the institute in recent years.

Jugechha, a drama troupe that he formed in his native place of Baripada was a well-known troupe and staged plays in different parts of Odisha as well as throughout the country.

Some of his television serials aired on Doordarshan include; Asara Aloka, Sri Jagannath, Subhadra, Sara Akasa, Samaya Chaka, Sakalara Apekhya Re, Nadekhile Loka Dekhe, Mahayagyan and Bidhatara Khela.

== Political career ==
Mohanty joined Indian National Congress on 27 February 2014. He stood for election to become a member of Parliament from Bhubaneswar Lok Sabha seat in 2014 Indian general elections and was defeated. In 2018, he resigned from Congress citing that he was not actively involved in politics after the 2014 general elections.

== Death ==
Mohanty died in Care Hospital at the age of 70 on 20 July 2020 evening in Bhubaneswar. After his condition deteriorated in the evening, he was rushed to Care Hospitals. He, however, died while undergoing treatment.

== Awards and honours ==
- Chilika teeray - National Film Awards (1978) - Certificate of merit for best Odia film.
- Jayadev Award - 2014 (Odisha State Film Awards).
- He was honoured with National Award for his contribution to art and literature.
- Won the Odisha State Film Awards six times for Arati (1981), Mamata Mage Mula (1985), Ei Aam Sansara (1986), Aam Ghara Aam Sansara (1991), Bhisma Pratingya (1993) and Bhai Hela Bhagari (1994).
- Orissa Cine Critics Award in 1987 for "Best Actor of the Decade".

== Filmography ==
- Naga Phasa (1977)
- Suna Sansar (1978)
- Chilika Teerey (1977)
- Pipasa (1978)
- Samarpana (1978)
- Pati Patni (1978)
- Sautuni (1979)
- Kie Jite Kie Hare (1981)
- Arati (1981)
- Tike Hasa Tike Luha (1981)
- Samaya Bada Balaban (1982)
- Astarag (1982)
- Ram Rahim (1983)
- Swapna Sagara (1983)
- Danda Balunga (1984)
- Dora (1984)
- Jeevan Sangram (1984)
- Janani (1984)
- Kaberi (1984)
- Jai Phula (1984)
- Para Jhia Ghara Bhangena (1985)
- Jaga Hatare Pagha (1985)
- Pooja Phula (1985)
- Sankha Sindura (1985)
- Hakim Babu (1985)
- Sahari Bagha (1985)
- Mamata Mage Mula (1985)
- Sata Kebe Luchi Rahena (1985)
- Ei Aama Sansar (1985)
- Chaka Bhaunri (1985)
- Sanskar (1986)
- Manika (1986)
- Chha Mana Atha Guntha (1986)
- Bhuli Huena (1987)
- Eai Ta Dunia (1987)
- Tunda Baida (1987)
- Basanti Apa (1987)
- Thili Jhia Heli Bohu (1987)
- Suna Chadhei (1987)
- Kasturi (1987)
- Bada Bhauja (1988)
- Pua Moro Kala Thakura (1988)
- Jahaku Rakhibe Ananta (1988)
- Michha Maya Sansar (1989)
- Sagar (1989)
- Mamata Ra Dori (1989)
- Chaka Aakhi Sabu Dekhuchi (1989)
- Pratisodha Aparadh Nuhen (1989)
- Sasti (1989)
- Asuchi Mo Kalia Suna (1989)
- Bidhira Bidhan (1989)
- Maa Mate Shakti De (1990)
- Daiba Daudi (1990)
- Hasa Luha Bhara Diniya (1990)
- Chakadola Karuchi Leela (1990)
- Ei Sangharsh (1990)
- Thakura Achanti Chau Bahaku (1990)
- Bastra Harana (1990)
- Ama Ghara Ama Sansara (1990)
- Vidhata (Telugu Film) (1991) as Sarvarayudu
- Kotia Manish Gotiye Jaga (1991)
- Ki Heba Sua Posile (1991)
- Ghara Mora Swarga (1992)
- Panjuri Bhitare Sari (1992)
- Naga Panchami (1992)
- Bhisma Pratigyan (1992)
- Anti Churi Tanti Kate (1992)
- Pathara Khasuchi Bada Deulu (1993)
- Bhagya Hate Dori (1993)
- Bhai Hela Bhagari (1994)
- Gopare Badhuchi Kala Kanhei (1994)
- Lakshe Shiva Puji Paichi Pua (1994)
- Pacheri Uthila Majhi Duaru (1994)
- Suna Panjuri (1995)
- Sakhi Rakhiba Mo Shankha Sindura (1996)
- Vasudha (1996)
- Laxman Rekha (1996)
- Sasu Hathakadi Bhauja Bedi (1997)
- Rakhi Bhijigala Aakhi Luha Re (1997)
- Katha Rahigala Kala Kala Ku (1997)
- Kie Kahara (1997)
- Jibana sathi (1997)
- Savitri (1997)
- Ram Laxman (1997)
- Laxmi Pratima (1998)
- Babu Parashuram (1998)
- Bou (1998)
- Mana Rahigala Tumarithare (1999)
- Kie Pochhiba Maa Akhira Luha (1999)
- Janmadata (1999)
- Rakata Chinhichhi Nijara Kie (1999)
- Sahara Jaluchi (2000)
- Kasia Kapila (2000)
- Maha Sangram (2000)
- Samaya Chakare Sansara Ratha (2000)
- Mo Mana Khali Tori Pain (1995)
- Kula Nandan (1995)
- Sakhi Rahila Ae Singha Duara (1994)
- Pua Mora Jagata Jita (1997)
- To Akhi Mo Aina (1999)
- Mo Kola To Jhulana (2001)
- Dharma Debata (2001)
- Baazi (2001)
- Rahichi Rahibi Tori Paain (2002)
- Maa Mangala (2002)
- Maa Kande Aaji Puate Pain (2002)
- Dharma Sahile Hela (2002)
- Sindura Nuhein Khela Ghara (2002)
- Ziddi (2003)
- Sabata Maa (2003)
- Katha Deithili Maa Ku (2003)
- Je Panche Para Manda (2003)
- Tu Mo Akhira Tara (2005)
- Premi No. 1 (2005)
- Prema Rutu Aslilare (2005)
- I Love You (2005)
- Dharma Ra Heba Jay (2005)
- Babu I Love You (2005)
- Agni Pariksha (2005)
- Priya Mo Priya (2005)
- Tate Mo Rana (2005)
- Tu Mo Manara Mita (2006)
- Rakate Lekhichi Naa (2006)
- I Love My India (2006)
- Nari Nuhen Tu Narayani (2007)
- Nari Akhire Nian (2007)
- Mu Tate Love Karuchi (2007)
- Mo Suna Pua (2007)
- Mahanayak (2007)
- To Pain Nebi Mu Sahe Janama (2007)
- Chaka Chaka Bhaunri (2007)
- Kali Sankar (2007)
- Lal Tuku Tuku Sadhaba Bahu (2007)
- Kalinga Putra (2008)
- Mate Ta Love Helare (2008)
- Satya Meba Jayate (2008)
- Dream Girl (2009)
- Shatru Sanghar (2009)
- Mukhyamantri (2009)
- Romeo: The Lover Boy (2009)
- Love Dot Com (2009)
- Tu Thile Mo Dara Kahaku (2010)
- Don (2010)
- Mu Kana Ete Kharap (2010)
- Dil Tate Deichi (2010)
- Prema Adhei Akhyara (2010)
- Megha Sabari Re Asiba Pheri (2010)
- Om Namaha Shivaya (2010)
- Chhatire Lekhichi Tori Naa (2011)
- Hata Dhari Chaluthaa (2013)
- Daha Balunga (2013)
- Mita Basichi Mu Bhuta Sathire (2013)
- Selfish Dil (2019)
- Golmaal Love (2019)
