= Uttam Mohanty =

Indian actor (1958–2025)

- Born: 29 April 1955; Baripada, Odisha, India
- Died: 27 February 2025 (aged 69); New Delhi, India
- Other name: Kunia
- Education: M.K.C. High School; Maharaja Purna Chandra College, Baripada
- Occupation: Actor
- Years active: 1977–2025
- Spouse: Aparajita Mohanty (m. 1987)
- Children: Babushaan Mohanty

Uttam Mohanty (29 April 1955 – 27 February 2025) was an Indian film and television actor who had to his credit more than 135 Odia films and acted in 30 Bengali films and in a Hindi film Naya Zaher.

== Early life ==
Mohanty was born and brought up in Baripada in a Karan family. His grandfather settled in Baripada 150 years ago. He completed his early education from M.K.C. High School. As a child he was very naughty which brought fresh complaints from outside. After matriculation he joined Maharaja Purnachandra College, Baripada for his intermediate and bachelor's in science. During his college days he was inclined more towards acting. He always tried to play the lead part in dramas. He was equally passionate to sports like badminton and table tennis. After completing graduation, he went to Ludhiana for chartered accountancy. Thereafter he stayed with his elder brother, the late Arun Ku. Mohanty, in Kolkata for some time, enrolled in a chartered accountancy course there. He was closely associated with Baripada.

== Career ==
Knowing that a film named Abhiman was being made in Baripada, he returned home with a hope of trying his luck in films. Though there were many contenders for the lead role, the director Sadhu Meher had a special interest in his capability and looks. He was selected. Co-actress Rita Chand was also debuting in that film. On the day of shooting he turned up to the set well-dressed with best possible suits available. Sadhu told him to take the make-up of a poor man. He was sent again to come back with old and dirty clothes and without make-up. The 1977 film was a box office hit.

Uttam now opted seriously to be an actor, and slowly stabilised his position in the Odia film industry. While staying in Kolkata he got an offer from director Dhir Biswal for his upcoming film titled Gouri. Later that role was given to Prasanta Nanda. The next film he did was "Pati Patni" opposite Mahasweta Ray. Then a streak of films like "Nijhum ratira sathi", "Chinha Achhinha", "Ramayana", Tapasya, Ram Balram happened. By the time he was established as a romantic star.Uttam Mohanty was especially adored for his effortless naturalism in front of the camera and a distinctively urbane charisma that broke free from the prototypical Odia screen hero of the past. He went on to form successful screen pairs with many leading ladies like Rita Chand, Sujata Ananda, Tandra Roy, Mahasweta Ray, Deepa Sahu, Subhra Pati, Aparajeeta, Baisali, Sangeeta Das and even Rachana Benerjee and other non-Odia actress. Often hailed as the one-man industry, Uttam Mohanty dominated Odia cinema for three decades. The 1980s were the pinnacle of his career. Many Ollywood films of the 1980s had Uttam Mohanty in them, and he dominated the Odia film industry. He excelled in various roles: Romantic, Village Lad, Character. Abhiman, Danda Balunga, Bhakta Salabega are even remembered today for his stupendous acting. He also worked in around 30 Bengali films and one Hindi film - Naya Jahar, opposite Satabdi Roy.

In the early eighties he played in almost 20 movies opposite leading actress Mahasweta Ray (Rasmi Ray). Though they fell in love and decided to marry, the love did not last long, and the pair separated. "Palatak" (1985) was their last film. Again the pair was hit in 1988 by Prashanta Nanda in the film of "Ja Devi Sarbavutesu". Later both came in lot of films in nineties. Over fifty of his films are opposite Aparajita Mohanty, his wife. They first appeared together in Astaraga (1982), and married on 17 May 1987 in Municipality Guest House, Bhubaneswar. Other heroines who have acted opposite him include Anita, Sujata, Tandra, Deepa, Baisali, Subhra Pati, and Rachana Bannerje.

After 1995 he got more character roles due to his age. In films like "Jashoda", "Subhadra", Kalamanika he did character roles. In the later period of his career he also took television roles. Serials like 'Je Pakhi Ude Jete Dura', 'Sara Akash', Panatakani and 'Uttaradayi' are most popular. His role as Bikhu bhai in Sara Akash is memorable. His Hindi serials include Palash and Bengali serial bideshini Bohu. His has also contributed to music albums and Bhajaans.

Uttam Mohanty has been at a prominent actor for nearly two decades, appearing in the Odia film industry throughout the 80's and 90's. His rural fan base led him to do many films which had rustic story lines. Some critics and fellow actors have been stated publicly that during the early nineties, when the Odia film industry was under heavy financial stress, it was Uttam Mohanty's efforts and charm which helped them avert the crisis. He is in demand among off-mainstream filmmakers as well. He has won many Odia filmfare awards and prizes as a best actor. A number of societies and institutes have honored him as a living legend of Ollywood cinema.

== Personal life and death ==
Mohanty later lived in Bhubaneswar. He latterly worked for Odia tele-serials and films, and was interested in the area of politics. He and Aparajita Mohanty had a son named Babushan Mohanty who has established himself as a leading Ollywood name.

Mohanty died in New Delhi on 27 February 2025, at the age of 66.

== Awards and accreditation ==
- Odisha Living Legend Award 2012
- Orissa State Film Award for Best Actor for Phula Chandana, Jhiati Sita Pari, Danda Balunga, Suna Chadhei
- Orissa State Film Award for Best Supporting Actor for To Binu Anyagati Nahin
- Jayadeb Puraskar in 1999
- Awards from Citic Association, Chitrapuri, Banichitra, Chalachitra Jagata
- 5th FITFAT Biscope Award, 2008

== Filmography ==
- 1977 – Abhimaan
- 1978 – Kabi Samrat Upendra Bhanja
- 1978 – Pati Patni
- 1978 – Sankha Mahuri
- 1978 – Sarapancha Babu
- 1984 – Danda Balunga
- 1980 – Ramayan
- 1979 – Chinha Achinha
- 1979 – Nijhum Ratira Sathi
- 1980 – Ram Balaram
- 1981 – Akshay Trutiya
- 1981 – Arati
- 1981 – Debajani
- 1982 – Astaraga
- 1982 – Dekh Khabar Rakh Najar
- 1982 – Jwain Pua
- 1983 – Abhilasha
- 1983 – Jhiati Sita Pari
- 1983 – Ram Rahim
- 1984 – Jai Phula
- 1984 – Janani
- 1985 – Chaka Bhaunri
- 1985 – Jaga Hatare Pagha
- 1985 – Mamata Mage Mula
- 1985 – Palatak
- 1985 – Puja Phula
- 1985 – Samay Bada Balaban
- 1985 – Sankha Sindura
- 1986 – Sahari Bagha
- 1986 - Sata kebe Luchi rahena
- 1986 – School Master
- 1986 – Aei Ama Sansara
- 1986 – Jor Jar Mulak Tar
- 1986 – Paka Kambal Pot Chhata
- 1987 – Badhu Nirupama
- 1987 – Chaka Akhi Sabu Dekhuchi
- 1987 – Aei Ta Duniya
- 1987 – Golamgiri
- 1987 – Anyaya Sahibi Nahi
- 1987 – Michha Mayara Sansara
- 1982 – Phula Chandan
- 1987 – Suna Chadhei
- 1987 – Tunda Baida
- 1988 – Thili Jhia Heli Bohu
- 1988 – Jahaku Rakhibe Ananta
- 1988 – Bada Bhauja
- 1988 – Kanyadana
- 1988 – Papa Punya
- 1988 – Pua Mora Kala Thakura
- 1988 – Chaka Dola Karuchi Lila
- 1989 – Daiba Daudi
- 1989 – Hasa Luha Bhara Duniya
- 1989 – Rajanigandha
- 1989 – Nyaya Anyaya
- 1989 – Paradeshi Chadhei
- 1989 – Thakura Achhanti Chau Bahaku
- 1990 – Topae Sindura Di Topa Luha
- 1990 – Sasti
- 1990 – Ja Devi Sarba Bhuteshu
- 1990 – Gopare Badhuchi Kala Kanhei
- 1990 – Raja Rani
- 1990 – Kandhei
- 1990 – Panchu Pandav
- 1990 – Nua Bhauja
- 1990 – Bidhira Bidhan
- 1991 – Naya Zaher (Hindi)
- 1991 - Aama Ghara Aama Sansara
- 1991 – Mukti Tirtha
- 1991 – Bastra Haran
- 1991 – Akuha Katha
- 1991 – Kapala Likhan
- 1991 – To Binu Anya Gati Nahi
- 1992 – Badshah
- 1992 – Bhisma Pratigyan
- 1992 – Maa
- 1992 – Naga Panchami
- 1992 – Sukha Sansara
- 1993 – Sukher Swarga (Bangali movie)
- 1993 – Bhagya Hate Dori
- 1993 – Dadagiri
- 1994 – Akuha Katha
- 1994 – Naga Jyoti
- 1994 – Pacheri Uthila Majhi Duaru
- 1995 – Rakata Kahiba Kie Kahara
- 1996 – Pua Mora Bhola Shankar
- 1996 – Sakala Tirtha To Charane
- 1997 – Lakhe Siba Puji Paichi Pua
- 1997 – Nari Bi Pindhi Pare Rakta Sindura
- 1997 – Raghu Arakhita
- 1998 – Rupa Gaanra Suna Kania
- 1998 – Sahara Jaluchi
- 1999 – Kala Chakra
- 1999 – Maa Pari Kie Haba
- 2001 – Baazi
- 2001 – Mo Kola To Jhulana
- 2002 – Dharma Sahile Hela
- 2002 – Samaya Kheluchi Chaka Bhaunri
- 2002 – Sei Jhiati
- 2005 – Agni Parikshya
- 2005 – Om Shanti Om
- 2005 – Bazi
- 2007 – Ae Jugara Krushna Sudama
- 2007 – Mu Tate Love Karuchi
- 2007 – Tumaku Paruni Ta Bhuli
- 2009 – Romeo – The Lover Boy
- 2009 – Ailare Odia Pua
- 2009 – Tu Mori Pain
- 2009 – Pagala Karichi Paunji Tora
- 2013 - Badhu Nuhen Mu Bandhu
- 2015 - Manzoor (Short Movie)
- 2015 - Shabnam(Bangladeshi movie)
- 2017 - Dil ka Raja
- 2017 - Apobad (Bengali movie)
- 2018 - Shakti
- 2022 – Bidyarana

=== Serials ===
- Katha Kahuthile Saribani
- Panatakani
- Sara akasha
- Uttardai
