= List of Odia films of the 1960s =

A list of films produced by the Ollywood film industry based in Bhubaneswar and Cuttack in the 1960s:

Title	Director	Cast	Genre	Notes
1960
Sri Lokenath	Prafulla Sengupta	Akshya Mohanty, Urvashi	Mythological	first Oriya film which got National Film Awards
Nua Bau	Prabhat Mukherjee	Prashanta Nanda,Dhira Biswal	Social	Prashanta Nanda won National Film Award for Best Actor
1961
Parinam	Biswanath Nayak	Pramod Panigrahi, Gitisudha	Social	
1962
Dashyu Ratnakar	Prabhat Mukherjee	Sharat Pujari, Shanti, Prashanta Nanda	Mythological	
Jayadeb	Byomakesh Tripathy	Byomakesh Tripathy, Shefali	Historical	
Nua Bou	Prabhat Mukherjee	Sharat Pujari, Leela	Social	
Laxmi	Sharada Nayak	Gaur Ghosh, Chandana, Babi, Dayanidhi Das	Mythological	
1963
Manik Jodi	Prabhat Mukherjee	Akshya Mohanty, Sukhalata, Babi	social	
Suryamukhi	Praful Sengupta	Soumendra, Meenati		
Naari	Trilochan	Ashok, Aneema		
Shri Shri Patitapaban	Sukumar Ganguli	Shyam, Laxmipriya		
Jeevan Sathi	Prabhat Mukherjee	Sarat Pujari, Meenati		
Sadhana	Prabhat Mukherjee	Sharat Pujari, Meenati		
Jayadeba	Shiba Bhattacharya	,		
1964
Amada Bata	Amar Ganguly	Umakant, Jharana Das		
manika Jodi	Prabhat Mukherjee	Sarat Pujari		
1965
Naba Janma	Sachin Mukherjee	Sarat Pujari, Jharana Das		
Abhinetri	Amar Ganguly	Umakant, Jharana Das		
Malajanha	Nitai Palit	Akshya Mohanty, Jharana Das		
Jeevan Sathi	Prabhat Mukherjee	Prashanta Nanda, Meenati		
Bhagya	Amar Ganguly	Gaura Ghosh		
1966
Kaa	Sidharth	Gaur Ghosh, Chandana		
Matira Manisha	Mrinal Sen	Prashanta Nanda, Sarat Pujari, sujata Anand,Bhanumati Devi	Based on Kalindi Charan Panigrahi's Novel	National Award Silver lotus For Best Oriya Film.
1967
Bhai Bhauja	Sarathi	Babi, Manimala		
Arundhati	Prafulla Sengupta	Sarat Pujari, Minati		
1968
Kie Kahara	Nitai Palit	Sarat Pujari, Leela		
Stree	Sidharth	Gaur Ghosh, Sadhana		
1969
Bandhana	Nitai Palit	Prashanta Nanda, Geetanjali		
Adina Megha	Amit Mitra	Prashanta Nanda, Jharana Das, Sandhya		
