= List of Odia films of the 1950s =

A list of films produced by the Ollywood film industry based in Bhubaneswar in the 1950s:

Title	Director	Cast	Genre	Notes
1950
Saptasajya	Kalyan Gupta	Byomakesh Tripathy, aneema		
Sri Jagannath	Chita Ranjan Mitra	Gopal Chandra Ghosh, Gloriya Mohanty		
1951
Roles to Eight (aka Rolls – 28)	Kalyan Gupta	Ratikanta & Kamala		Fourth Oriya film in release and The first Oriya film with an English name.
1953
Amari Gann Jhia	Binaya Banarjee	Gaur Ghosh, Chapala, Gopal Banarjee		
1954
Kedar Gouri	Manaranjan Das	Gaur Ghosh, Beena		
1956
Bhai Bhai	Nitai Palit	Gaur Ghosh, Chapala, Beena		
1959
Maa	Nitai Palit	Gaur Ghosh, Chandana		
Shree Shree Mahalaxmi Puja	Biswanath Nayak	Sharat Pujari, shefali		
