= List of Odia films of 1963 =

This is a list of films produced by the Ollywood film industry based in Cuttack in 1963:

== A-Z ==
Title	Director	Cast	Genre	Notes
1963
Jeevan Sathi	Prabhat Mukherjee	Sarat Pujari, Meenati		
Manik Jodi	Prabhat Mukherjee	Akshya Mohanty, Sukhalata, Babi	social	
Naari	Trilochan	Ashok, Aneema		
Shri Shri Patitapaban	Sukumar Ganguli	Shyam, Laxmipriya		
Suryamukhi	Praful Sengupta	Soumendra, Meenati		
