= Shantanu Mohapatra =

Indian musician, singer, and composer (1936–2020)

- Born: 1936; Baripada, Mayurbhanj district, Odisha
- Died: 30 December 2020 (aged 83–84) Bhubaneswar, Odisha
- Occupations: musician, singer and composer
- Instrument: Vocalist

Shantanu Mohapatra (1936–2020) was an Indian musician, singer and composer. He sang in Odia, Hindi and Bengali languages. He also directed music for Odia, Bengali, Hindi and Telugu films. He composed music for more than 1,600 songs.

== Early life ==
Shantanu Mohapatra was born on 6 January 1936, in Baripada, Mayurbhanj district in Odisha. From the age of five, he learned music from Guru Banchhanidhi Panda. He began performing on stage at the age of eight. In 1956, he graduated from IIT Kharagpur with a degree in Applied Geology and Geophysics. While studying at IIT, he became involved with the Indian People's Theatre Association (IPTA) and mastered the art of group music. He learned music direction from Salil Chowdhury. In June 1956, he joined the Department of Mines & Geology, Government of Odisha and retired from there as a director. He worked as a geophysicist in Odisha Mining Corporation till retirement in 1994.

== Music career ==
Santanu Mahapatra made his debut as an Odia movie music composer in 1963 with the film Surjyamukhi. He composed music for 50 odd movies, features, telefilms, documentaries and especially art movies. He has also been credited as the first Odia music director to work in films in five different languages include Odia, Hindi, Bengali, Assamese and Telugu. His filmography include Surjyamukhi(1963), 'Arundhati(1967), Chilika Teerey(1977), Bagh Bahadur(1989) etc.

Mohapatra had composed the first modern Odia ballad 'Konark Gatha' with lyricist Gurukrushna Goswami and it was sung by Akshaya Mohanty. He has done more than 1,900 compositions, including 53 feature and telefilms films, 10 Jatras, 60 dramas by AIR (Cuttack) and 10 dance dramas to his credit.

== Honors and awards ==
- Lalit Kala Akademi Award – 2004
- Odisha Film Critics Award, 1995
- Mother Teresa Millennium Award, 2005

== Death ==
He died of pneumonia on 30 December 2020, at the age of 84.
