= Raghav Raj Bhatt =

Kathak dancer and sketch artist

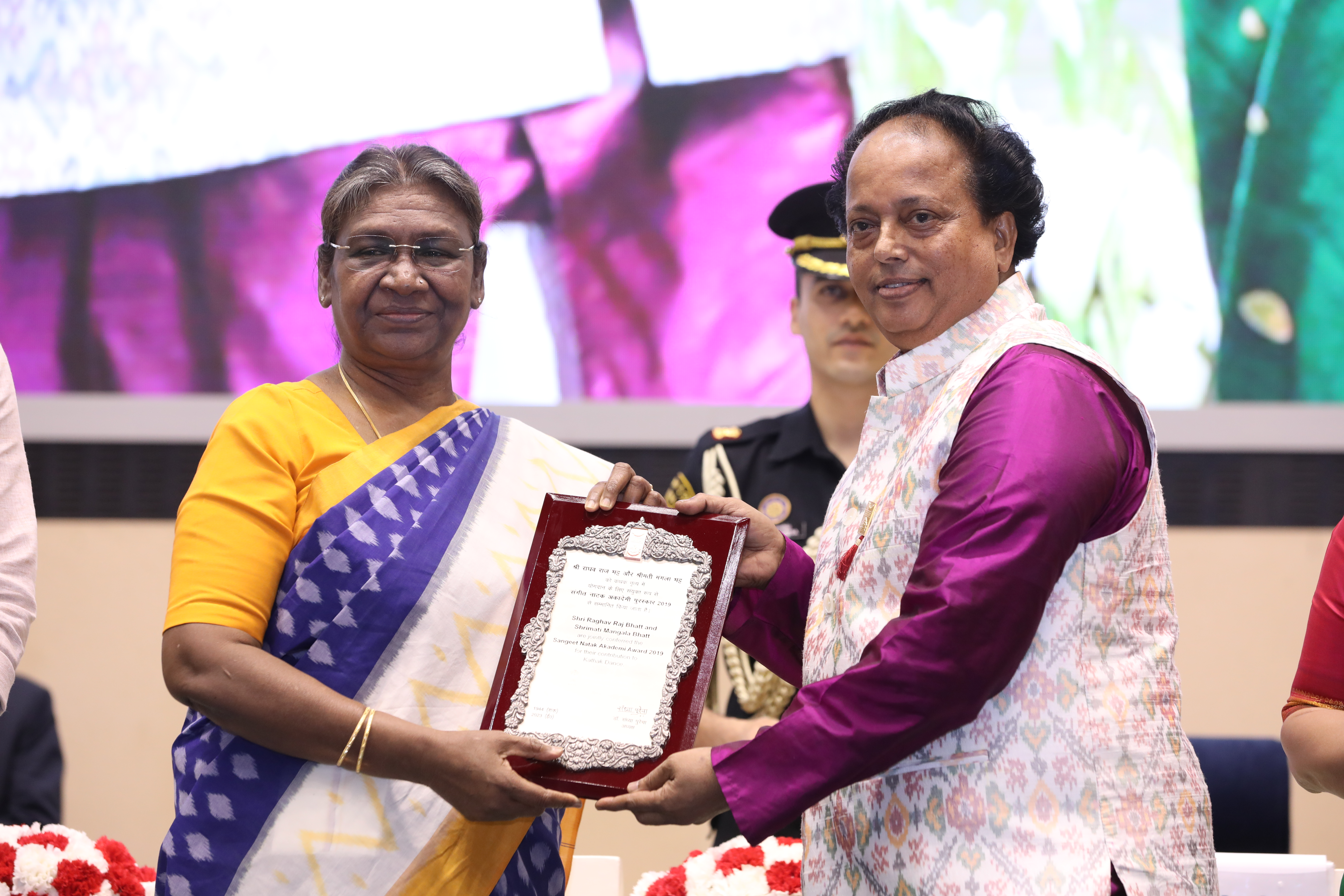
Raghav Raj Bhatt receiving the Sangeet Natak Akademi Award from Hon'ble President of India Smt Droupadi Murmu for his contributions to the field of classical dance (2019) - Kathak

Raghav Raj Bhatt is a Kathak dancer, sketch artist and folk and tribal arts expert. He is the prime disciple of Padma Vibhushan Pt Birju Maharaj Ji. His solo, duet and group productions have been staged at numerous prestigious festivals in India and abroad.

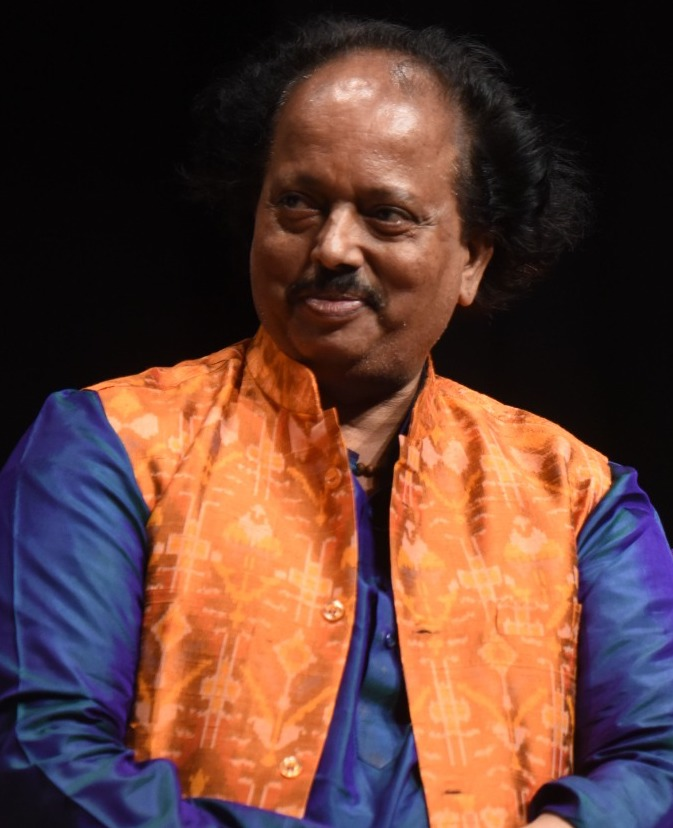
Raghav Raj Bhatt

== Early life ==
Raghav was born in Hyderabad to Dr Gopal Raj Bhatt, a folk and tribal art revivalist and Vijaya, a home maker.

== Personal life ==
Raghav was married to Kathak danseuse, choreographer Mangala Bhatt, who was the senior disciple of Pt Durga Lal Ji. They performed together and continued to take their passion for arts forward through their learning centre - Aakruti Kathak Kendra. They lived in Hyderabad, India.

== Career ==
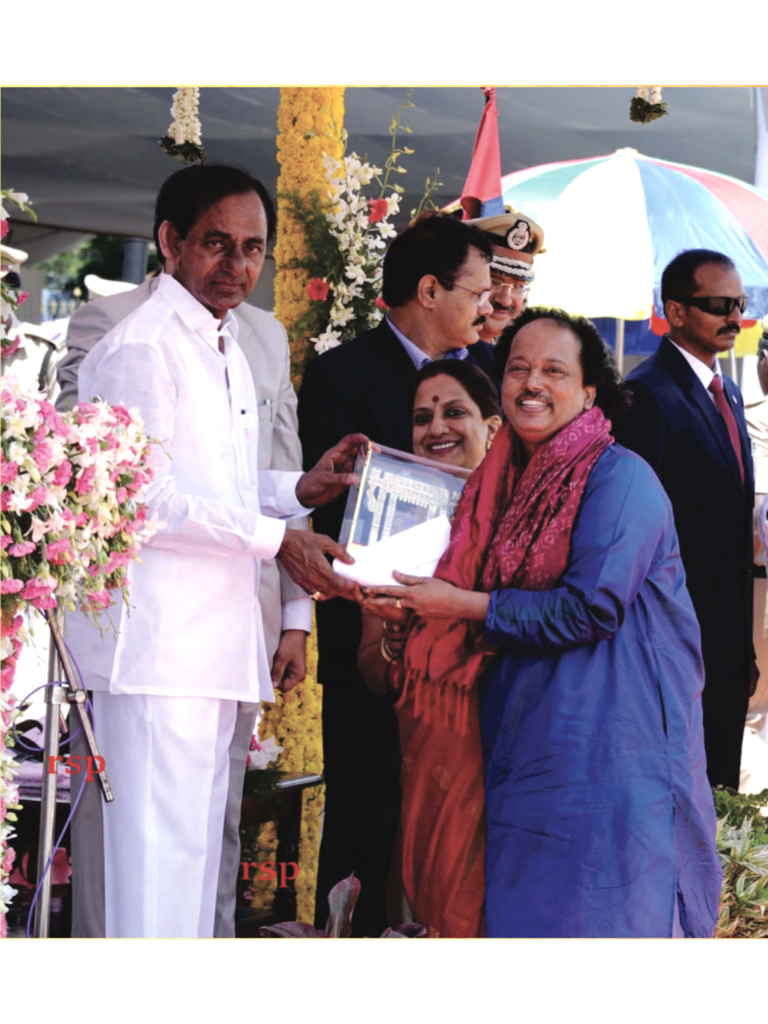
Mangala & Raghav Raj Bhatt receiving the State Award from K Chandrasekhar Rao

Raghav was selected on a national scholarship to learn from Padma Vibhushan Pt Birju Maharaj Ji. Encouraged by his father, he moved to Delhi to train at Kathak Kendra under the aegis of Maharaj Ji. After completing his Visharad in Kathak, Raghav excelled as a dancer, performing in almost all of his major dance drama and classical productions in India and abroad.

Taking inspiration from his father, Raghav also is closely involved with folk & tribal arts projects. His efforts have been recognised by numerous institutions and government bodies such as Sangeet Natak Akademi, Centre for Cultural Resources and Training, Indian Council for Cultural Relations, Ministry of Culture, Department of Language & Culture, Govt of Telangana, etc.

Mangala Bhatt & Raghav Raj Bhatt have received numerous honours for their contribution to classical dance, art and culture. They were conferred the State Award by Chief Minister K Chrandrasekhar Rao and more recently they also received the 13th Guru Deba Prasad Award.

As of 2023, Raghav Raj Bhatt is the Principal of the ST Govt College of Music and Dance.

Mangala & Raghav Raj Bhatt have been conferred with the prestigious Central Sangeet Natak Akademi Award for their lifetime contribution to the field of Kathak.

== Books ==
Ang Kavya by Pt Birju Maharaj - credited for his sketches.

== See also ==
- Pt Birju Maharaj Ji
- Pt Durga Lal Ji
- Kathak
- List of Kathak Exponents
- Mangala Bhatt
- Sangeet Natak Akademi
