= Chha Mana Atha Guntha =

1986 Odia film directed by Parbati Ghose

- Directed by: Parbati Ghose
- Written by: Parbati Ghose
- Story by: Fakir Mohan Senapati
- Based on: Six Acres and a Third by Fakir Mohan Senapati
- Produced by: Parbati Ghose
- Starring: Parbati Ghose; Bijay Mohanty; Sarat Pujari
- Edited by: Tapas Mukhopadhyay
- Music by: Prafulla Kar
- Release date: 30 November 1986
- Country: India
- Language: Odia language

Chha Mana Atha Guntha is a 1986 Indian Odia language feature film directed and produced by Parbati Ghose.Bijay Mohanty and Parbati Ghose played lead roles in the film and Sarat Pujari in a negative role. The movie is based on the novel Six Acres and a Third by Fakir Mohan Senapati.

== Cast ==
- Parbati Ghose as Saria
- Bijay Mohanty as Bhagia
- Sarat Pujari as Ram Chandra Mangaraj
- Gloria Mohanty
- Asim Basu
- Sidhant mohapatra

== Plot ==
Ram Chandra Mangaraj, a landlord (Sarat Pujari) eyes on a highly fertile land of a married couple (wife Saria and Husband Bhagia) and plots conspiracy to snatch the land. The husband (Bijay Mohanty) becomes mad after losing the land. Their cow is also taken. The wife Saria (Parbati Ghose) was beaten to death by the landlord. The landlord suffers badly, hears the echoes of the woman in several emotions, who lost her husband, land and everything. The voice of the lady always heard by the landlord was - "Give me my 6 acres and 3rd, Give me my the cow". The landlord dies of his bad Karma.

== Development ==
After finishing film Sansaar in 1971, she announced with her husband her next project will be a movie based on Fakir Mohan Senapati's epic novel Chha Mana Atha Guntha. But somehow the project got delayed due to uncertain reason. However, after over a decade she was able to work on that project in 1986 she made her directorial debut, was produced and acted at the same time.

== Reception ==
=== Critical response ===
The film was Parbati's first directorial debut, based on Fakir Mohan Senapati's epic novel Chha Mana Atha Guntha, produced and acted in the film. Her work and the film was received critical acclaim.
