= Chapala =

Chapala may refer to:

- Chapala, Jalisco, a town in the Mexican state of Jalisco, on the northern shore of Lake Chapala
- Lake Chapala, the largest freshwater lake in Mexico, in the states of Jalisco and Michoacán
- Chapala, a 1899 painting by Félix Bernardelli
- Cyclone Chapala, a powerful tropical cyclone occurring in the Arabian Sea during the 2015 season

== Persons with the given name ==
- Chapala Nayak, Indian actress, played in Sri Jagannath

== See also ==
- Cha'palaa (also known as Chachi or Cayapa), a language
- Chapala Chennigaraya, a 1990 Indian film
