= List of Odia films of 1950 =

This is a list of films produced by the Ollywood film industry based in Cuttack in 1950:

== A-Z ==
Title	Director	Cast	Genre	Notes
1950
Saptasajya	Kalyan Gupta	Giridhari, Pankaja Nanda, Ratikanta Nayaka		
Sri Jagannath	Chitta Ranjana Mitra	Gopal Chandra Ghosh, Gloria Mahanty, Kartik Ghosh	Devotional	
