= Manimala Devi =

Indian Odia film actress (1931–2016)

- Born: 19 June 1931; Balibishi, Cuttack
- Died: 16 June 2016 (aged 84); Bhubaneswar
- Years active: 1960–1990
- Known for: Actress
- Children: Shankar Ghosh

Manimala Devi (19 June 1931 – 16 June 2016) was an Indian Odia film actress. Devi was born in the Bilibasi village of Cuttack, and stepped into the film world at the age of nine. She never went to school. In 1945 she started to act in the Annapurna theatre of Cuttack.

The films in which Devi acted, including her first film, Shri Lokanath, received national awards. Audiences especially enjoyed the performances she shared with Samuel Sahoo.

== Dramas ==
- Chandaluni
- Janaki
- Chasha Jhia
- Kala Pahada
- Mukti Konark
- Shree Jayadev

== Films ==
- Andha Diganta, 1990
- Kichi Smruti Kichi Anubhuti, 1989
- Nishiddha Swapna, 1988
- Klanta Aparanha, 1985
- Maya Miriga, 1984
- Niraba Jhada, 1984
- Kie Kahara, 1967
- Bhai Bhauja, 1967
- Kaa, 1966
- Malajanha, 1965
- Abhinetri, 1965
- Jeevansathi, 1963
- Lakshmi, 1962
- Shree Lokanath, 1960

== Awards ==
- Kabisamrat Upendra Bhanja Award : 2008
- Jayadev Award: 2000
- Guru Kelucharana Mohapatra Award: 1999
- Odisha Sangeeta Nataka Academy Award : 1987 (Lifelong achievement Award))‌

== More Data ==
- Manimala Devi at IMDb
