= Biswaprakash =

- Directed by: Susant Misra
- Written by: Susant Misra
- Produced by: National Film Development Corporation of India
- Starring: Sanjeev Samal; Nandita Das; Christina Ranck; Carman Cordwell
- Cinematography: Jugal Debata
- Edited by: Susant Misra
- Music by: Vikash Das
- Distributed by: National Film Development Corporation of India
- Release date: 1999
- Running time: 148 minutes
- Country: India
- Language: Odia

Biswaprakash (aka The Young Rebel) is a 1999 Indian Oriya film directed by Susant Misra. This multi-layered plot with complex characters has been young and acclaimed filmmaker Susant Mishra’s favourite format on celluloid, like his earlier acclaimed film Indradhanura Chhai, which claimed the Grand Prix prize at the Sochi International Film Festival in Russia and was screened at the coveted Cannes Film Festival. Biswaprakash, besides claiming a berth in the Indian Panorama in the last IFFI, has also been screened in Cairo, Singapore and Shanghai international film festivals. The film has further fetched the National Film Award as the best film in regional category.

== Plot ==
Biswaprakash, a young man in his early twenties is a rebel revolting constantly against the obscure traditional oriental lifestyle of his family rooted deeply in the medieval socio-religious mores. A misfit for the consumerist culture of a society where the value system is changing at a faster pace, he is alienated from his family and friends. While so many questions relating to society, sex and morality intrigue him, Anjali, an independent, liberated and down-to-earth young woman enters his life. She strives to convert their mansion-like house into a holiday home besides looking after her paralysed mother, all alone. The friendship between Biswa and Anjali flourish amidst severe twists and turns till a policeman intervenes and breaks up the relationship.

A disheartened Biswa turns to religious rituals in despair with the belief to redeem himself of the misery. And then, one day, another woman enters his life this time June, a young lady traveller from abroad. Biswa befriends June and in her, he finds a new hope of escaping the claustrophobia. But a time comes when June deserts him for a new destination leaving Biswa utterly lonely and trapped in a situation of no return.

== Cast ==
- Sanjeev Samal as Biswaprakash
- Nandita Das as Anjali
- Christina Ranck
- Carman Cordwell
- Binyaka
- Anu Chowdhury

== Awards and participation ==
- Shanghai International Film Festival, 1999
- Cairo International Film Festival, 1999
- Rotterdam Film Festival, 2001 (won Critics Choice award.
- International Film Festival of India, 2000 (Indian Panorama section)
- National Film Awards 2000 (Silver Lotus for Best Oriya Film)

== Music ==
Jugal Debata has arranged music for this film.

== Shooting location ==
This movie was shot in Puri, in the state of Orissa, India. That city is also famous for Lord Jagannath Temple. The production team found a very famous old palatial building, in the heart of the city, which was a perfect match with the story line. The owner of that building is the famous Kaviraj Purna Chandra Rath.
