= Rebati =

Short story

Rebati (ରେବତୀ)
- Author: Fakir Mohan Senapati
- Language: Odia language
- Genre: Short story
- Published: 1898
- Publication place: India

Rebati (Odia: ରେବତୀ) is a short story by Fakir Mohan Senapati, published in 1898. It is considered first ever short story published in Odia language.

== Theme ==
Rebati is the story of a young girl who desire's for education in the backdrop of a conservative Odia society in a backward village, which is hit by a Cholera epidemic. The story itself also opens a third dimension when it deals with a very well bonded relation between Rebati and a school teacher. By displaying a forbidden desire for learning, Rebati, the female protagonist of the story, seems to invite misfortune for herself and her community. Over time "Rebati" has become an icon and her story an allegory for female education and emancipation. However the story itself does not advocate for or against these ideas. It is a story about helplessness before fate.

== Role of "Rebati" in the development of Odia literature ==
The story is celebrated as an example of Fakirmohan’s reformist zeal. The story marks the beginning of a new crop of women writers in Odia language such as Sarala Devi, Kuntala Kumari Sabat, Kokila Devi etc. It has influenced the short story writers of Odisha at a later period. In the early 1980s, Jagadish Mohanty, wrote a story based on the protagonist character "Rebati". and it made a new tradition. Since then hundreds of stories were written on women’s agony, where "Rebati" represents women’s fate in the changing scenario of the time. Asit Kumar Mohanty later published all the stories, along with both Fakir Mohan and Jagadish’s "Rebati" in two of his collections under the same title.

== See also ==
- Six Acres and a Third
