= Mangala Bhatt =

Indian dancer (1963–2025)

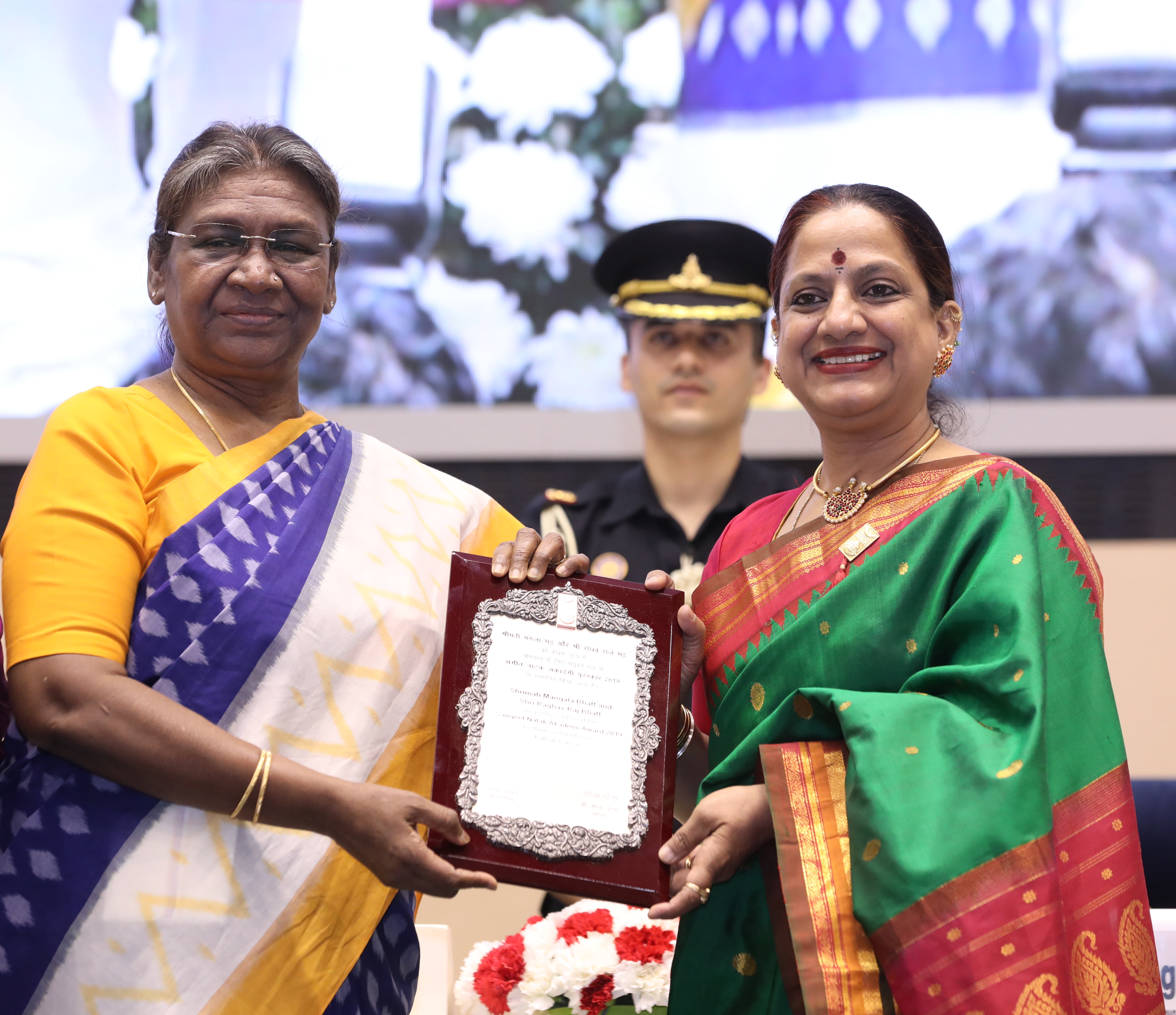
Mangala Bhatt receiving the Sangeet Natak Akademi Award from President of India Droupadi Murmu for her contributions to the field of classical dance (2019) - Kathak

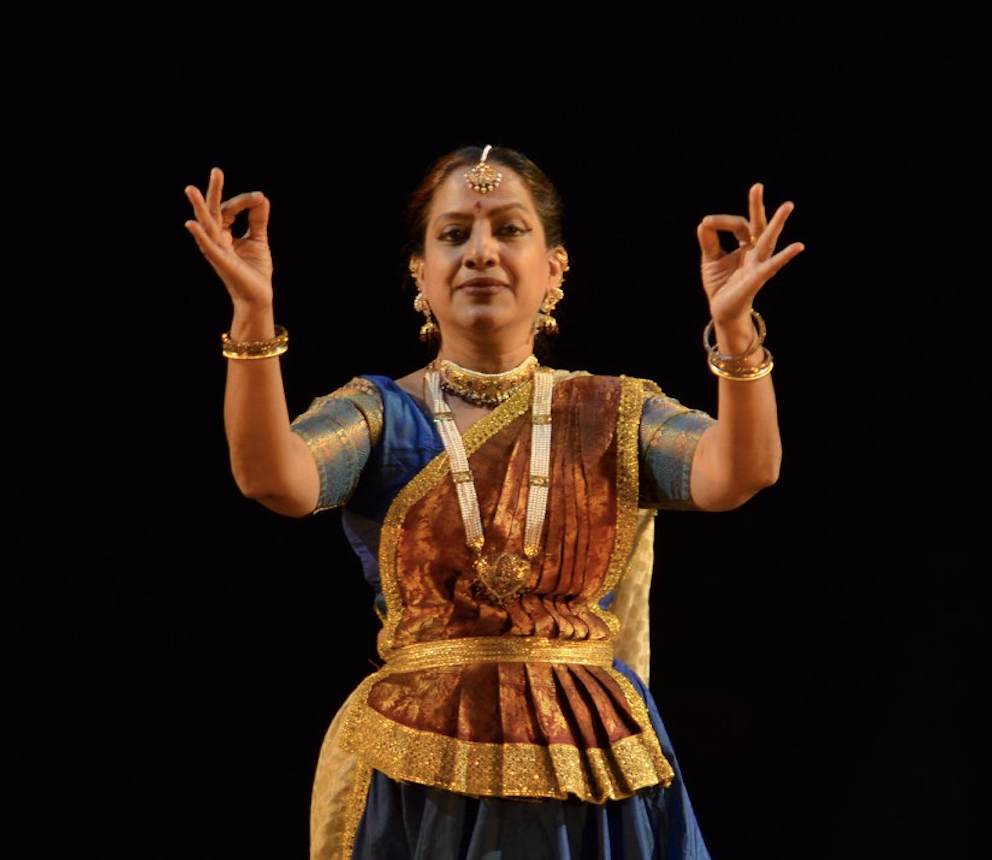
Mangala Bhatt

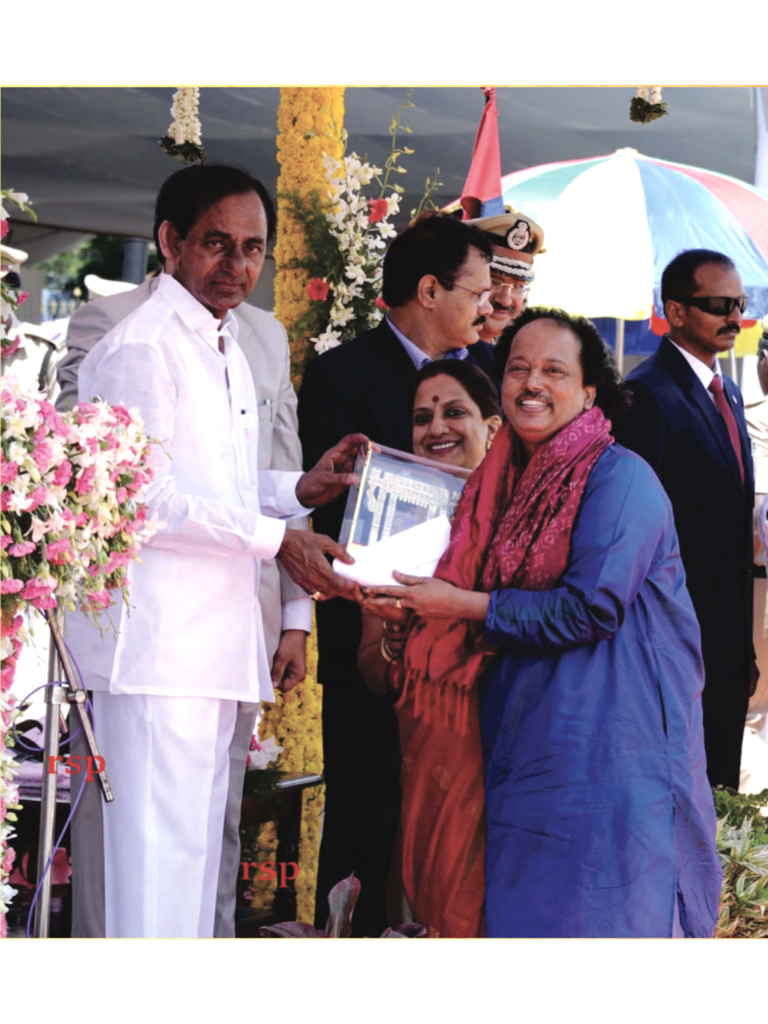
Mangala & Raghav Raj Bhatt receiving the State Award from K Chandrasekhar Rao

Mangala Bhatt (1963 – 16 June 2025) was an Indian Kathak dance exponent. She was the senior disciple of Kathak maestro Pt. Durga Lal of Jaipur Gharana. She performed at many festivals in India. She was also the founding director of Aakruti Kathak Kendra.

== Early life ==
Bhatt was born in Kolhapur, Maharashtra in 1963, and received her initial education in Kolhapur. She applied to the prestigious Kathak Kendra institute in New Delhi, India and got through on a national scholarship.

== Career ==
At Kathak Kendra, New Delhi, Bhatt initially trained under late Shri Kundanlal Gangani and later under the Kathak maestro Durga Lal. Her work took her to major productions choreographed by Durga Lal and Birju Maharaj. Rohini Bhate also guided her. She was particularly known to combine Kathak with other distinct art forms such as jazz drums, flamenco, qawwali, ghazals, performance poetry, kalaripayatu, modern dance, ballet, painting among others.

== Personal life and death ==
Mangala Bhatt was married to Kathak dancer and artist Raghav Raj Bhatt, whom she met while training at Kathak Kendra. Raghav Raj Bhatt was a prime disciple of Padma Bhushan Pt Birju Maharaj Ji. After their marriage, Bhatt moved to Hyderabad, India to continue her work in Kathak. The dance duo was synonymous with Kathak. They brought together the confluence of two distinct styles of Kathak, representing Jaipur Gharana and Lucknow Gharana.

Bhatt died on 16 June 2025, at the age of 62.

== Works ==
In 1990, Bhatt along with her husband started Aakruti Kathak Kendra in Hyderabad, to take forward their mission of promoting, popularising and propagating classical Kathak dance. Numerous students engage with Kathak through a range of activities such as weekly dance classes, workshops, lecture-demonstrations as well as research into the interfacing of Kathak with other Indian and Western art forms.

Bhatt along with her husband received many state, national and international accolades and awards for her enormous contribution in the field of arts and culture, and was also conferred the prestigious Telangana State Award by Chief Minister K Chandrasekhar Rao. Bhatt was an empanelled artist of Indian Council for Cultural Relations (ICCR), Doordarshan and was associated with Sangeet Bharti, Kathak Kendra and ICCR for national and international projects. She was also proactively a part of initiatives by organisations such as SPICMACAY, Heal a Child, Rotaract and others, which integrate art and culture into the upliftment of the society. She regularly featured in guest lectures at schools, institutions and bodies like the Centre for Cultural Resources and Training (CCRT). Besides this, Bhatt also was the director and curator and host of Antarang, a music and dance festival held in Hyderabad every year.

Bhatt and Raghav Raj Bhatt were conferred with the prestigious Central Sangeet Natak Akademi Award for their lifetime contribution to the field of Kathak.

== See also ==
- Pt Durga Lal Ji
- Pt Birju Maharaj Ji
- Kathak
- Raghav Raj Bhatt
- List of Kathak Exponents

== Sources ==
- https://timesofindia.indiatimes.com/entertainment/telugu/movies/news/love-legacy-kathak-raghav-mangala-bhatts-love-song-in-hyderabad/articleshow/108498551.cms
- SNA Award https://www.thehindu.com/news/cities/chennai/chen-arts/chen-dance/the-sangeet-natak-akademi-award-is-a-shot-in-the-arm-for-raghav-and-mangala-bhatt-from-hyderabad/article66237978.ece
