= Kanhu Charan Mohanty =

Indian Odia language novelist

- Born: 11 August 1906; Nagabali, Sankhatras, Cuttack, British India
- Died: 6 April 1994 (aged 87)
- Education: Ravenshaw College
- Occupation: Novelist
- Writing career
- Language: Odia
- Notable awards: Sahitya Akademi Award (1958); Sahitya Akademi fellowship (1994)

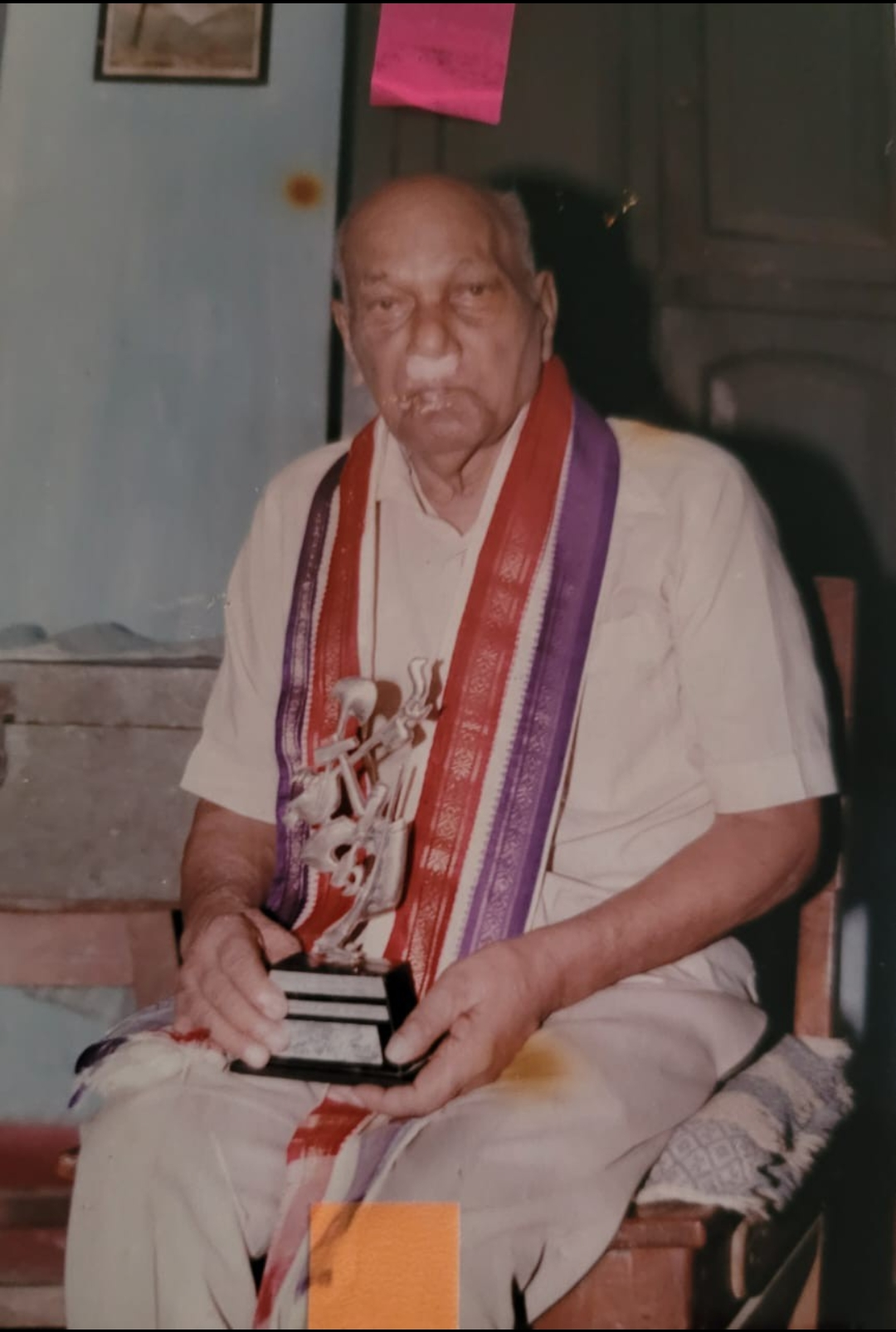
Kanhu Charan Mohanty with the Sahitya Akademi Award received in 1958

Kanhu Charan Mohanty (11 August 1906 – 6 April 1994) was an Indian Odia language novelist who wrote fifty-six novels in a career spanning over six decades from 1930 to 1985. He is considered "one of the most popular and celebrated novelists of Odisa". Mohanty was awarded the Sahitya Akademi Award in 1958 for his novel, Kaa, published in 1956, and was one of the fellows of the Sahitya Akademi. Mohanty died on 6 April 1994 at the age of 87.

== Personal life ==
Kanhu Charan Mohanty was born on 11 August 1906 in Nagabali village of Cuttack, India, to a Karan family. He is an elder brother of Gopinath Mohanty (1914–91) who was also a Jnanpith Award-winning (1974) Odia novelist. He completed his schooling at Cuttack and joined an engineering college which he was forced to leave due to financial difficulties. Later, he completed his graduation from Ravenshaw College (now Ravenshaw University) in 1929. Mohanty joined as a clerk in Government Service and retired as a Senior Administrative Officer in 1964. Mohanty died on 6 April 1994 at the age of 87.

== Literary works ==
Mohanty wrote his first novel Utshabe Byasane during 1923–24. However, the novel was never published and its manuscript could not be traced later. His novels first published in 1930, Arana and Patalaka. His 1932 published novel Nishpatti is considered the first Oriya novel to depict the events of a marriage between a child and a widow. He published two novels in 1944, Bhala Paibara Sesha Katha and Tunda Baida. Bhala Paibara Sesha Katha portrays the untouchability in the Indian society and Tunda Baida depicts the relation between a widow and her younger brother-in-law and rumors spread about them by villagers. While Haa Anna (1935) was set against the backdrop of Orissa famine of 1866, his 1946 published novel Shasti (Punishment) depicts famine's aftermath and pestilence during the years 1866 and 1870. Both the novels portrayed the romantic love stories with social and economical inequality. His Sahitya Akademi Award-winning novel Kaa (Impersonation, 1956) deals with the subject of female infertility and maternal death. In Kshana Kshanake Ana (The World Changes Every Moment, 1975) Mohanty narrates the story of step-mothers and domestic violence. He published fifty-six novels in a career spanning over six decades from 1930 to 1985 with Jaksha (1985) being his last published novel.

== Legacy ==
Mohanty is considered "one of the most popular and celebrated novelists of Odisha". He is known for depicting social realism and most of his work involved problems associated with plight of woman, caste and economic exploitation. It was noted that he, being an upper caste writer, portrayed lower caste characters in his writings. His novels are set around coastal Odisha. Scholar Sisir Kumar Das appreciated Mohanty's authentic illustration of regions compared to actual geographical location but noted that the author has tendency to create an Utopian world while representing the human life. Shasti (1946) is considered "one of the best progressive writings in Oriya" and "one of the earliest novels to use psychoanalysis to reveal different moods and emotions of its characters". Mohanty's work, in terms of its theme and writing style, is noted to be on the similar lines of another Odia novelist Fakir Mohan Senapati (1843–1918) with more critical social and cultural evaluation but lacking sense of humour and satire of Senapati. He said to have been influenced by The Woodlanders (1887) by Thomas Hardy for Shasti and by Pavilion of Women (1946) by Pearl S. Buck for Kaa (Impersonation, 1956).

In 2006, The Government of Odisha decided to republish three Odia novels, Kaa by Mohanty, Matira Manisha (1931) by Kalindi Charan Panigrahi, and Mamu (1913) by Fakir Mohan Senapati to increase the popularity of Odia language among the youth. In January 2007, the Sahitya Akademi and Sarala Sahitya Sansad organised a two-day national seminar, "Kanhu Charan and the Rise of Indian Novel", to commemorate Mohanty's birth centenary. Odia novelist and a pioneer member of Sarala Sahitya Sansad, Pravakar Swain, noted that "[Mohanty's] books had a social commitment and sympathy for the insulted and the injured".

== Artistic depiction of novels ==
Some of Mohanty's novels were later made into films. 1965 Odia film Abhinetri (The Actress) is based on his 1947 published novel by the same name and marked first occurrence of Dual role, played by Jharna Das, in Odia cinema. Another novel Kaa (1956) was later made into a film Kaa (1965). The film was awarded the Certificate of Merit for the Best Feature Film in Odia at 14th National Film Awards. Tunda Baida (Gossip, 1944) was also made into a film in 1987 by the same name.

== Awards ==
Mohanty won several awards for his literary work. He won the Sahitya Akademi Award in 1958 for Kaa, the Jeevan Rang Prize in 1970, and the Neela Saila Award in 1992. On 4 February 1994, the Sahitya Akademi, India's National Academy of Letters, selected him as its fellow, the highest honour conferred by the Akademi; however, Mohanty died on 6 April 1994 before the honour could formally be conferred upon him.

== Bibliography ==
Mohanty published the following works under his name:

1920–40

1. Utsabe Byasane (1923) (Unpublished)
2. Arana (1930)
3. Patalaka (1930)
4. Baliraja (1932)
5. Nishpatti (1932)
6. Swapnana Satya (1933)
7. Duniara Dau (1934)
8. Haa Anna (1935)
9. Tathastu (1936)
10. Parichaya (1936)
11. Olatapalata (1937)
12. Parakiya (1938)
13. Udandi (1939)

1941–60

1. Adekha Hata (1943)
2. Pratiksha (1943)
3. Bhala Paibara Sesha Katha (1944)
4. Tunda Baida (1944)
5. Eparisepari (1945)
6. Shasti (1946)
7. Banagahanara Jale (1947)
8. Antaraya (1947)
9. Abhinetri (1947)
10. Bhuli Huena (1948)
11. Jhanja (1950)
12. Milanara Chhanda (1951)
13. Sarbari (1952)
14. Pari (1954)
15. Kaa (1956)
16. Bajrabahu (1959)

1961–80

1. Dheudheuka (1962)
2. Bagabaguli (1964)
3. Itihasa (1967)
4. Swapna (1968)
5. Chhutileghata (1968)
6. Jarangara Tale (1969)
7. Mana Jane Papa (1969)
8. Manamanthana (1970)
9. Ati Gopaniya (1970)
10. Angana (1971)
11. Mamatara Maya (1971)
12. Kahibaku Laja (1973)
13. Nirbisanka (1973)
14. Aji Nuhen Aau Dine (1973)
15. Kshana Kshanake Ana (1975)
16. Maya Bartta (1978)
17. Satya Bati (1980)
18. Kshanika (1980)
19. Apa (1980)
20. Namati Tara Champa (1980)

1981–85

1. Taraka (1981)
2. Tapasi (1982)
3. Lalatalikhana (1983)
4. Melani Maguni (1983)
5. Pabani (1984)
6. Jaksha (1985)
