= Geetanjali Sharma =

Indian Folk exponent and a Kathak dancer (born 1984)

- Born: 3 September 1984 (age 41); Mathura, Uttar Pradesh India
- Genres: Indian Classical Dance
- Occupations: Kathak Dancer, Krishna Raslila, Choreographer, Teacher, Promoter, Organizer
- Years active: 1998
- Website: geetanjalisharma.in

Geetanjali Sharma (born 3 September 1984) is an Indian Folk exponent and a Kathak dancer. She is the disciple of Uma Dogra, the senior disciple of Pt. Durga Lal who was the Kathak maestro from Jaipur Gharana. She has been performing dance in India and abroad for more than 24 years.

She is the recipient of National Youth Award (2010), Ustad Bismillah Khan Yuva Puraskar of Sangeet Natak Academy (2011), Yash Bharti Award, the highest award of Government of Uttar Pradesh (2015) and several many other regional and national level awards.

== Early life ==
Geetanjali was born to Nirmal Acharya and Dr P R Sharma in Mathura, Uttar Pradesh on 3 September 1984. She had her primary education from Saraswati Vidhya Mandir at Govardhan. No one from her family had artistic background. She did not get much guidance and support from the family. In the beginning stage of her career she started performing at school level without any formal training. Her first abroad performance was in Singapore. Later on, she performed in China, Mexico, London, America and many other countries.

== Career ==
Geetanjali Sharma started her dancing career at the very tender age. She herself established as a Brij Folk dancer by performing at local and regional level. In 1997, she established an academy named GIFT "Geetanjali International Folk Tang" for promoting Brij Folk and traditional arts. In 2008, she started learning Kathak under the guidance of Rajendra Gangani at Kathak Kendra, New Delhi and later she joined Uma Dogra in 2010. She completed her Prabhakar Degree from Prayag Sangeet Samiti, Allahabad. She is the first trained Kathak artist from Mathura, Uttar Pradesh.

She plays the role of Radha in her performances. she has been preserving the heritage of Mathura, the birthplace of Lord Krishna and Vrindavan, the place where Lord Krishna spent his childhood. Her performances of Rasa lila constitute of Mayur Nritya, Lath mar Holi, Flowers Holi of Barsana and Charukala, a special form of dance from Braj region of Uttar Pradesh.

She has given Kathak performances with senior artist like Bollywood Actress Hema Malini, Folk singer Malini Awasthi, Santoor player Pandit Shivkumar Sharma and many other renowned artists.

In the first week of November 2016, she was featured on the cover page of Indian weekly magazine Panchjanya. In December 2016, she received Brij Ratna Award, the highest award of Brij region of Uttar Pradesh.

On 18 December 2017, Geetanjali was announced as Brand Ambassador of Mathura-Vrindavan for Swachch Bharat Abhiyan, a campaign run by Government of India.

== Cultural Performances ==
=== National ===
- Khajuraho Dance Festival, Taj Mahotsav, Ganga Mahotsav, Pt. Durgalal Mahotsav,
- Raindrop Festival and many other festivals along with her Guru Uma Dogra.
- Kannauj Mahotsav in Uttar Pradesh.
- Cultural Performance in G20 Summit

=== International ===
- Cultural performance in Dubai Expo 2020
- Festival Of India Cultural Show in Fiji
