= Abhimanyu Lal =

Dancer and choreographer

- Known for: Kathak dance and choreography
- Parent(s): Geetanjali Lal, Pandit Devi Lal
- Relatives: Pandit Durga Lal
- Website: http://kathakresonance.com/

Abhimanyu Lal is an Indian classical Kathak dancer, choreographer and percussionist. He is the son and disciple of celebrated Kathak exponent Guru Geetanjali Lal.

== Early life and education ==
Abhimanyu Lal started formal training in Kathak, under his mother Guru Geetanjali Lal, in his teens. He was initially keen on becoming a singer, but once he started practising Kathak there was no looking back.

His interest in music also led him to take formal training in western drumming from the YMCA in New Delhi.

== Career ==
Abhimanyu is an ‘A’ grade artist of Delhi Doordarshan and is also an empanelled artist of ICCR (Indian Council for Cultural Relations).

He has been performing in major dance festivals, all over the world, in Vienna, Graz, Singapore, Croatia, Oslo, Netherlands, Canada, Egypt, Switzerland, Fiji Islands, Mauritius, Reunion island, Seychelles, South Africa, Bulgaria etc. He has performed at many prestigious events such as 64th Indian Republic Day celebration in Dubai 2013, London Olympics 2012, Birmingham International Dance Festival, IncredibleIndia@60 in New York, India festival in Russia.

He is currently working as a 'Varishtha Kathak Prashikshak'(senior instructor) at Kathak Kendra, New Delhi, training the next generation of artists.

== Performance style ==
Abhimanyu Lal is considered a master of footwork and is known to employ all the three major aspects of performance – Nritta (pure dance), Nritya (footwork and abhinaya) and Naatya (abhinaya). Often improvising during the course of the performance, he also finds ways to involve the audience, requesting the audience to clap and keep time with the footwork sequence.

As he doubles as a dancer and drummer, he gets many interesting reactions from audiences, often playing Kathak's rhythmic patterns on the drums. While he enjoys playing drum for traditional Kathak dance compositions and choreographies of his mother Guru Geetanjali Lal, he has also experimented with contemporary dance numbers, doing jugalbandi with African drummers.

== Awards and honors ==
- Shri Krishana Gana Sabha Endownment Award
- Nritya Jayantika Award
