= Nirmala Mishra =

Indian playback singer (1938–2022)

- Born: 21 October 1938; Majilpur, Bengal Presidency, British India
- Died: 31 July 2022 (aged 83); Chetla, Kolkata, West Bengal, India
- Occupation: Playback singer
- Spouse: Pradip Dasgupta
- Children: Subhojit Dasgupta (Son)
- Parents: Mohinimohan Mishra; Bhabani Devi

Nirmala Mishra (21 October 1938 – 31 July 2022) was an Indian singer of predominantly Bengali and Odia film songs. She also sang popular Assamese songs, most notably "Ki Naam di Matin". She was a recipient of the Sangeet Sudhakar Balakrushna Das Award as an honour for her lifetime contribution to Odia music.

== Early life and family ==
Mishra was born in Majilpur, as the daughter of Pandit Mohinimohana Mishra and Bhabani Devi on the eve of Durga Saptami. Later for her father's job, her family settled down in Chetla of Kolkata. There was a musical environment in her family. Father Pandit Mohinimohan Mishra and elder brother Murarimohan Mishra, both were famous singers. Her family title was Bandopadhyay (Banerjee). Later her family was awarded the title of 'Mishra'. Her father was also awarded the titles of 'Pandit', 'Sangitratna', and 'Sangitnayak' on behalf of 'Kashi Sangit Samaj'.

== Career ==
Music director Balakrushna Das gave her a chance to sing a song in 1960 for the first time in the Odia movie Shri Lokanath. Some of the hit Odia movies in which she has sung are: Stree, Kaa, Malajanha, Abhinetree, Anutap, Kie Kaahaara, Amadaa Baata, and Adina Megha.

== Honours and awards ==
- Balakrushna Das Award
