= Maa (1959 film) =

- Directed by: Nitai Palit
- Produced by: Gour Prasad Ghose, Parbati Ghose
- Starring: Chandana; Gour Prasad Ghose; Laxmipriya Mahapatra
- Release date: 1959
- Country: India
- Language: Odia

Maa is a 1959 Indian Oriya film directed by Nitai Palit.

== Cast ==
- Gour Prasad Ghose
- Chandana
- Laxmipriya Mahapatra

== Music ==
Song	Singer(s)	Composer	lyrics
"Bedana Saagara Tire Udaasi Mun Bainshi Sura"	Pranab Patnaik	Bhubaneshwar Mishra	Gurukrushna Goswami
"Agana Tora Dakuchi Mate"	Akshaya Mohanty	Bhubaneshwar Mishra	Gurukrushna Goswami
"Dhire Dhire Chale Raai Bana Raha Chanhi"			
"To Naa Re Pindhili Sadhi"			
