= Kaa (1965 film) =

- Directed by: Siddharth (Gour Prasad Ghose, Parbati Ghose, & Ram Chandra Thakur)
- Written by: Kanhu Charan Mohanty
- Produced by: Parbati Ghose
- Starring: Gour Prasad Ghose; Parbati Ghose; Geetarani; Manimala Devi
- Cinematography: Deoji Bhai; Bijoy De
- Music by: Bhubaneswar Mishra
- Production company: Sarathi Films
- Release date: 5 August 1966
- Running time: 165 min
- Country: India
- Language: Odia
- Budget: INR 1,12,500

Kaa is a 1965 Odia film directed by Siddhartha, which is a pseudonym for Gour Prasad Ghose, Parbati Ghose, & Ram Chandra Thakur. The film is based on Kanhu Charan Mohanty's award-winning literary masterpiece in the same name. The Film glorifies the story of a barren woman, who induced her husband to marry another woman for the sake of the birth of a child.

== Synopsis ==
Nandika (Parbati Ghose) and Sunanda (Gour Ghose) are happily married and live with mother-in-law Abhaya (Manimala Devi) and sister-in law Kuni in their ancestral rural home. After seven years of marriage, Nadika is still childless. Abhaya always worries about a successor to her family. Friends and relatives always blame and offend Nandika for her barrenness. So Nandika decides to make a sacrifice and convinces Sunanda to marry a girl again for the sake of a child. With lot of pressure from his mother and wife, Sunanda does marry Lalita (Geetarani). Lalita compels Sunanda to take her to his home in the city and starts living there. Over time, destiny takes a turn and it is Nandika that gets pregnant. Lalita becomes envious fearing Sunanda may not return to her. However, it so happens, Nandika dies after giving birth to a child. Lalita repents and adopts Nandika's child as her own child.

== Cast ==
- Gour Prasad Ghose - Sunanda
- Parbati Ghose - Nandika
- Geetarani - Lalita
- Manimala Devi - Abhaya
- Byomokesh Tripathy
- Krushna Chandra Pandey
- Niranjan Satpathy
- Mayadhar Raut
- Kumud Patnaik
- Gokulananda Parida
- Babaji Nayak
- Kunjanada Sahu

== Soundtrack ==
The music for the film is composed by Bhubanseswar Misra.

Song	Lyrics	Singer(s)
"Adina Bauda Adina Kuhudi"	Narsingha Mohapatro, SP Naik, & Debdas Chhotray	Akshaya Mohanty
"Libhi Libhi Jae Aakhi Luha"	Debdas Chotrai	Sandhya Mukherjee
"Tume Janana Janana Mun Janena"	Debdas Chotrai	Nirmala Mishra, Pranab Patnaik
"Maunabati Mauna Kiaan Lagai Dei Manare"	Narsingha Mohapatro, SP Naik, & Debdas Chhotray	Akshaya Mohanty
"Madhura E Chanda Raati Hase Taara"	Debdas Chotrai	Nirmala Mishra
"Chora Chora Chahanire"	Debdas Chotrai	Raghunath Panigrahi

== Trivia ==
The film's director, music composer and heroine have pseudonym names.

Role	Pseudonym	Real name
Director	Siddharth	(Ram Chandra Thakur, Gour Prasad Ghose & Parbati Ghose)
Music composer	Srikumar	Bhubneswar Misra
Actress	Chandana	Parbati Ghosh

== Box office ==
The film was made on a budget of INR 1,12,500.00. The film got a huge response and was a box office hit.

== Awards ==
- National Film Awards1966
  - President's Silver medal for Best Odia film.
