= Arundhati (1967 film) =

1967 film by Prafulla Sengupta

- Poster
- Directed by: Prafulla Sengupta
- Produced by: Dhiren Patnaik
- Starring: Braja; Minati Mishra; Sarat Pujari
- Cinematography: Bishu Chakravarty
- Edited by: Sukumar Sengupta
- Music by: Shantanu Mahapatra
- Production company: Kanakprabha Productions
- Release date: 1967
- Country: India
- Language: Odia

Arundhati is a 1967 Indian Oriya film directed by Prafulla Sengupta.

== Synopsis ==
Arundhati and Manoj are lovers and part of an Odissi dance troupe. Manoj desperately loves Arundhati. One day, while the troupe is performing in front of a packed audience, one Biswajeet claims Arundhati to be his wife Madhumati. Actually Madhumati died in a train accident, but Biswajeet still believes that Madhumati is still alive. In suspicion, Manoj leaves Arundhati and disappears. Arundhati tries to convince Biswajeet that she is not Madhmati and she has a deep love interest with Manoj. Later Biswajeet finds Madhumati and Arundhati are twin sisters and Madhumati actually died in an accident. Biswajeet left the troupe to search for Manoj. Biswajeet finds Manoj in a small railway station and persuades Manoj to reunite with Arundhati.

== Cast ==
- Sarat Pujari as Manoj
- Braja as Biswajeet
- Minati Mishra as Arundhati/Madhumati

== Music ==
The music of the film was composed by Shantunu Mahapatra. The tracks from the film include:

Track	Singer	Lyricist
"Mayuri Go Tuma Aakashe Mun"	Mohammad Rafi	Jibanananda Pani
"Tumaku Parunita Bhuli"	Mohammad Rafi	Jibanananda Pani
"Ei Chhota Katha Tie Bhulana"	Pranab Patnaik, Usha Mangeshkar	Gurukrushna Goswami
"Aaji Mun Shrabani Luhara Harini Jeun Rajani"	Lata Mangeshkar	Jibanananda Pani
"Abhimanini"		
"Shyama Gale"		
"Dekhiba Para"		

== Awards & Participation ==
- National Film Award for Best Feature Film in Oriya(1967) - President's medal for best Odia film Odia
