= Dharini =

- Directed by: Susant Misra
- Written by: Susant Misra; Ashima Chiber; R.N. Trivedi
- Starring: Kirti Kulhari; Rachna Shah; Avni Vasa; Jyoti Dogra; Richa Nayyar
- Cinematography: Jugal Debata
- Edited by: Ravi Patnaik
- Music by: Sujeet Chaubey; Akshaya Mohanty
- Release date: 2002
- Country: India
- Language: Odia

Dharini (aka Whispers of Change) is a 2002 India Oriya film directed by Susant Misra.

== Plot ==
Four women in a middle-class traditional household fight for dignity in their own ways. Sarala contracts a sexually transmitted disease from her wayward husband and is unable to bear children. She is distraught but helpless. Kamala takes a step towards change in the traditional male dominated family when she is asked to go for a repeated abortion. She defies her husband and leaves the house. Shweta, the widow considered a burden on the family too is encouraged to seek an honourable life. Nandini is already socially active and liberal minded aspiring for a free life away from home.

== Cast ==
- Kirti Kulhari
- Rachna Shah
- Avni Vasa
- Jyoti Dogra
- Richa Nayyar
- Subrat Dutta
