= Minati Mishra =

Indian classical dancer and actress (1929–2020)

- Born: Minati Das; 1929; Cuttack, Bihar and Orissa Province, British India
- Died: 6 January 2020 (aged 90–91); Switzerland
- Occupation: Classical dancer
- Years active: 1956–1990
- Spouse: Nityananda Mishra
- Children: One son
- Parent: Basanta Kumar Das
- Awards: Padma Shri; Sangeet Natak Akademi Award; Odisha Sangeet Natak Akademy

Minati Mishra (1929 – 6 January 2020) was an Indian classical dancer and actress, known for her expertise in the Indian classical dance form of Odissi. She was reported in 2011 to be the oldest-living Odissi performer. The Government of India honored Mishra in 2012, with the fourth-highest civilian award of Padma Shri.

== Early life ==
Minati Mishra, née Minati Das, was born in 1929 in Cuttack, now in the Indian state of Odisha, to Basanta Kumar Das, a local school headmaster, as the youngest of his three children. She started to learn dance and music at an early age, theme-based dance under the tutelage of Ajit Ghosh and Banabihari Maity and Odissi from Kabichandra Kalicharan Patnayak, an Odissi dancer. In 1950, Minati Mishra started learning under Kelucharan Mahapatra, the well-known Odissi guru.

In 1954, Minati Mishra joined Kalakshetra of Rukmini Devi Arundale, on a scholarship from the Government of Odisha, and learned Bharatanatyam for one year under Kutty Sarada and Peria Sarada. The next year, she joined the Indian Institute of Free Arts for training under Pandanallur Chokkalingam Pillai and Meenakshisundaram Pillai. She debuted in 1956, the first of several performances she rendered, during the next three years, at a number of major cities in India. In 1959, she was invited to Switzerland by the International Photographic Association, and performed in Zurich, Lucerne, Geneva and Winterthur. Three years later, she was awarded a doctoral degree in Indology from the Philipp University of Marburg, Germany for a thesis on Natyashastra. In 1963, she was invited for a performance at the Berlin Film Festival. She was noted for her expressive (Bhava) and dramatization (Abhinaya) skills.

== Acting career ==
Mishra acted in five Odia films. Her debut film Suryamukhi was released in 1963, followed by Jeevan Sathi, Sadhana, and Arundhati. All four received the National Film Award for Best Feature Film in Odia. She also acted in a 1963 Bengali film, Nirjana Saikate in which she has performed an Odissi dance number choreographed by Kelucharan Mahapatra. Apart from her film career she was also an A Grade artist at the All India Radio and was a recipient of Sangeet Prabhakar title for Hindustani vocal music.

Mishra was the principal of the Utkal Sangeet Mohavidyalaya, Bhubaneswar from 1964 till 1989. During her tenure there, the institution regularised its curriculum, academically formalised Odissi dance and music training, introduced theatrical aspects into the syllabus and established examination guidelines, all of which are reported to have helped in the revival of Odissi. The stint at the institution also gave her opportunity to work alongside the first-generation gurus of Odissi such as Pankaj Charan Das and Deba Prasad Das.

== Retirement ==
Soon after the death of her husband, Nityananda Mishra, who was an engineer, in 1980, Mishra retired from dance performances and formally retired in 1990. She settled in Switzerland and devoted her time to dance festivals, lecture tours and workshops in Switzerland, Canada and India.

She died on 6 January 2020 in Switzerland.

== Filmography ==
Her films include:

Year	Film	Language	Director
1963	Suryamukhi	Odia	Prafulla Sengupta
1963	Jeevan Sathi	Odia	Prabhat Mukherjee
1963	Nirjan Saikate	Bengali	Tapan Sinha
1964	Sadhana	Odia	Prabhat Mukherjee
1967	Arundhati	Odia	Prafulla Sengupta
1967	Bhai Bhauja	Odia	Sarathi

== Awards and recognitions ==
Mishra was a recipient of the 1975 Orissa Sangeet Natak Akademi Award. She also received the Kalinga Shastriya Sangeet Parishad Award and in 2000, she received the Sangeet Natak Akademi Award. In 2012, the Government of India awarded her the Padma Shri, the fourth-highest civilian award of India.
