= Geetanjali Lal =

Indian classical dancer and choreographer (born 1948)

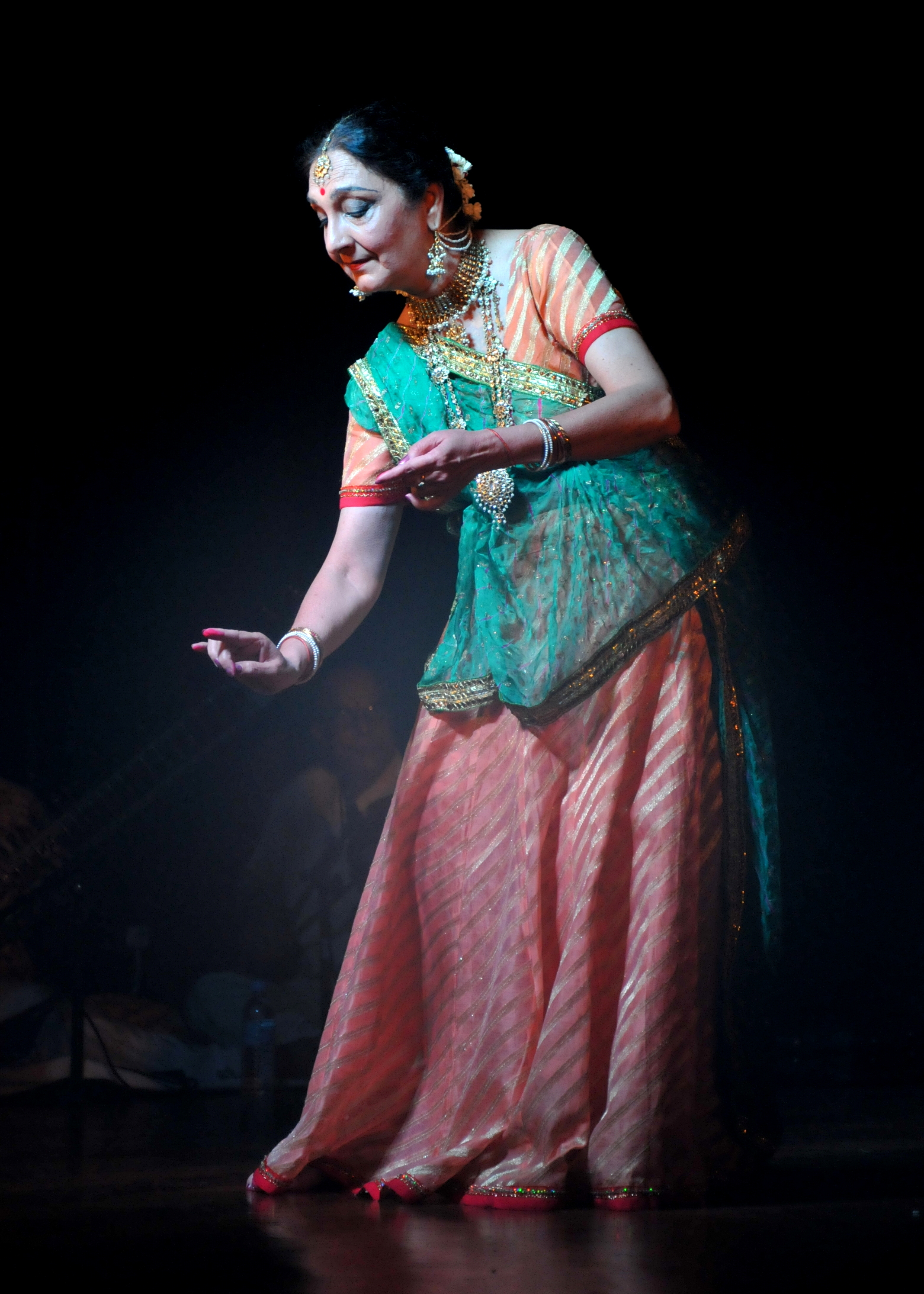
- Born: Geetanjali Desai; 5 November 1948 (age 77); Baroda, Gujarat, India
- Occupations: Artistic Director, Devi-Durga Kathak Sansthan
- Known for: Kathak dance and choreography
- Spouse: Pandit Dev Lal
- Children: Abhimanyu Lal
- Website: http://kathakresonance.com/

Geetanjali Lal (born Geetanjali Desai; 5 Nov 1948) is an Indian Kathak dancer and choreographer.

== Early life and education ==
Geetanjali Lal received formal training in Hindustani Classical music from her father, Rajnikant Desai – vocalist & professor of music and the disciple of Aftab-e-Mosiqui Ustad Faiyaz Khan of Agra Gharana. She began formal training in Kathak dance at an early age of 6, under the distinguished Kathak danseuse Roshan Kumari.

Geetanjali Lal continued with her formal training in Kathak dance under stalwarts – Pandit Gopi Krishna, Shri Mohan Rao Kallianpurkar and Pandit Devi Lal of Jaipur Gharana.

== Career ==
She held the post of Chief of Repertory and Director of Kathak Kendra from 2009-2012. She is a top grade artist of Doordarshan and Indian Council for Cultural Relations, New Delhi.

Geetanjali is well known for her abhinaya and other features of the Jaipur gharana, like laykaari, intricate rhythmic patterns in her footwork. Geetanjali Lal had, ringing out the year 2001, surprised the audience with her imaginative choreography drawing on the tragic earthquake in Kutch, the attack on the twin towers of the World Trade Centre in New York, and the popular TV quiz show ‘Kaun Banega Crorepati' starring Amitabh Bachchan.

Geetanjali also acted in Kashmiri feature film – Shayar-e-Kashmir Mahjoor (1972) by Prabhat Mukherjee – in the lead role, alongside actors Balraj Sahani, Parikshit Sahni, Pran.

== Personal life ==
She was married to Pandit Dev Lal of Jaipur Gharana.

Famous Kathak dancers Abhimanyu Lal (her son), Vidha Lal and Avenav Mukherjee are her disciples.

== Awards and honors ==
- Sangeet Natak Akademi Award by Sangeet Natak Akademi in 2007

Also, she has been awarded the title of “Nritya Sharada”, "Natya Kala Shree”, “Bharat Gaurav”, “Kala Shiromani” "Indira Gandhi Priyadarshini award" and “Kalpana chawala award, "Jjijabai Women Achivers Award", "Acharya Kala Vipanchee"
