= Asim Basu =

Indian actor and artist (1935–2017)

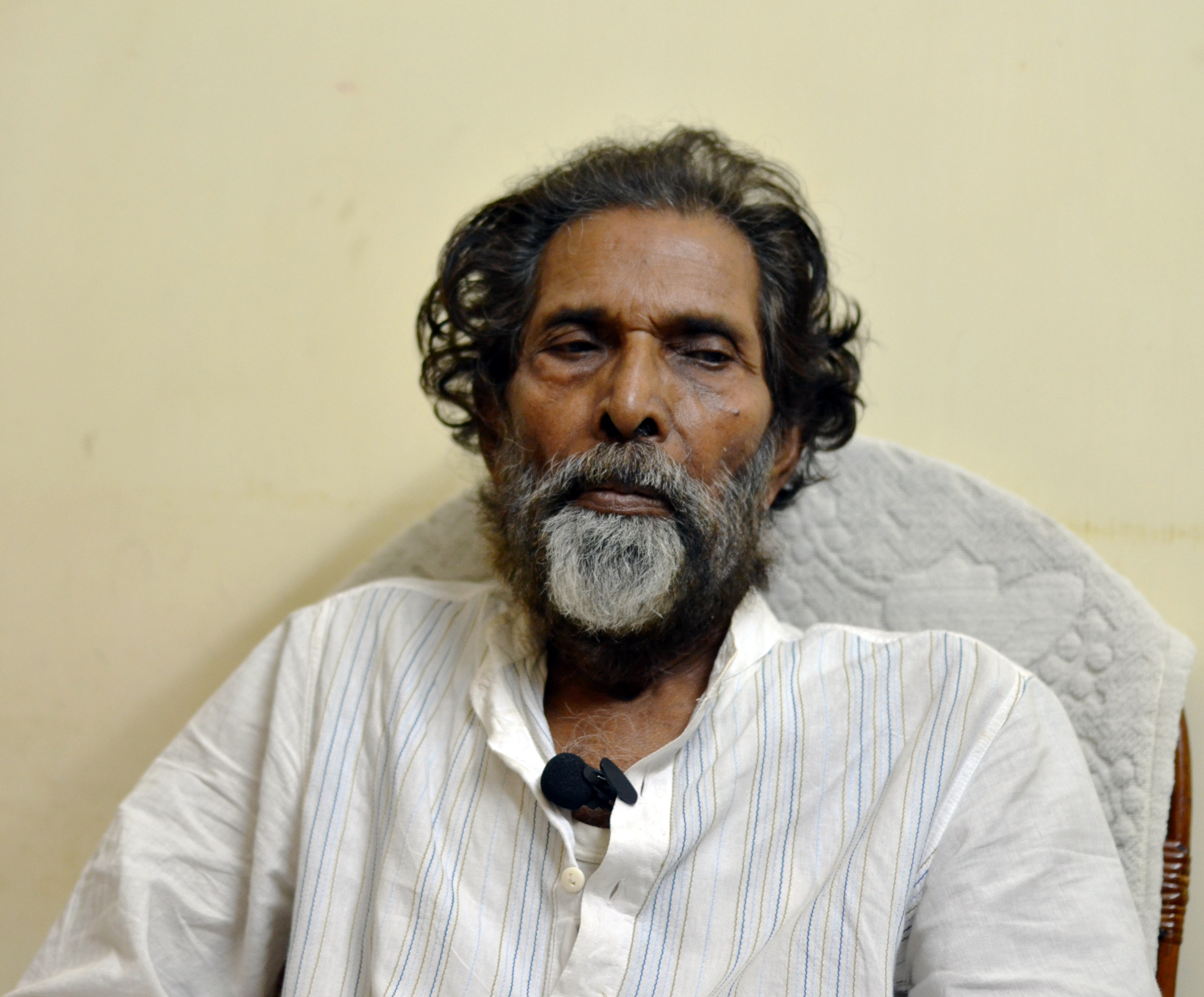
- Asim Basu in Bhubaneswar
- Born: 30 November 1935; Kakhada, Bhogarai, Balasore, Orissa, British India
- Died: 1 February 2017 (aged 81); Bhubaneswar, Odisha, India
- Occupations: Production designer Art director, Theater director, freelance columnist
- Years active: 1940-2017
- Asim Basu's voice Recorded December 2014

Footage from an interview with Asim Basu.

Asim Basu was an Indian theatre artiste and director, actor, art director, painter and playwright. Basu was known for his set design work in Ollywood movies and designing Odia book covers and movie posters.

== Early life ==
He was born in 1935, to Motilal Basu and Bijanbala Basu in Kakhada village, Bhogarai, Balasore district. When Basu was in Kolkata during his college days, he chanced to work with actor Utpal Dutt in Minerva Theatre, Kolkata and his talents flourished in acting, direction and stage designing there. He came back to Odisha and formed a theatre group “Rupakar”.

== Career ==
Basu made his debut in play as a director with Bijay Mishra's 'Duiti Surya Dagdha Phula Ku Nei'. He directed around 200 plays. He has worked as a stage designer for over 500 plays and was the art director for several Odia films. He was an art-director in films like Chha Mana Atha Guntha, Indradhanura Chhai and Shodh (Hindi). He also made his appearances in many Tele films and films like Chha Mana Atha Guntha, Jaga Balia and Dadagiri.

== Death ==
A fund was raised by state government’s Culture department and Khordha district administration for his treatment. Basu died from lung infection on 1 February 2017 in Bhubaneswar, Odisha at the age of 81.

== Filmography ==
Year	Film	Director	Actor	Cinematographer	Art director	Source
1986	Chha Mana Atha Guntha		Yes		Yes	
1990	Maa Mate Shakti De				Yes	
1993	Indradhanura Chhai				Yes	
1993	Dadagiri			Yes		
2001	Hemanter Pakhi			Yes		
2010	...And Once Again			Yes		

== In popular culture ==
- 'Asim Basu Memorial Award' presented by Nandanik, a Theatre group based in Koraput, Odisha was given to encourage the young theatre artist.

== Awards ==
- Basu was awarded the state Sangeet Natak Akademi Award in 1998.
- He was awarded with Parampara Samman in 2012.
