= Dashyu Ratnakar =

- Directed by: Prabhat Mukherjee
- Produced by: Krushna Chandra Tripathy Sharma
- Starring: Prashant Nanda, Sarat Pujari, Shanti
- Music by: Balakrishna Das
- Release date: 1962
- Country: India
- Language: Odia

Dashyu Ratnakar (1962) is an Ollywood /Oriya film directed by Prabhat Mukherjee.

== Synopsis ==
Dasyu Ratnakar kills travelers for the support and maintenance of his family. When suggested by Narad Muni to enquire his family members i.e. his father, mother, wife and children if they would receive some portions of his vice which he had done for their maintenance, Ratnakar is astonished by their replies. They all replied that it is his (Ratnakar's) duty to maintain his family. They are not responsible for the method by which Ratnakar earns money. At that reply, Ratnakar was deeply shocked, promised to shun all his vices and achieved sage-hood through deep penance.

== Cast ==
- Prashant Nanda
- Sarat Pujari
- Shanti
