= Susant Misra =

Indian film director

Susant Misra is an Oriya film director whose films have been screened and feted at many international film festivals.

== Early life ==
Born in Cuttack, Orissa, he is a postgraduate diploma-holder in screenplay writing and direction from the FTII, Pune.

== Career ==
While he was studying at FTII his diploma film Nischal Badal was screened at the competitive section of Oberhausen Film Festival in Germany. After completing his diploma, in 1993 he directed his first feature film Indradhanur Chaai that won him the Grand Prix at the Sochi International Film Festival in Russia and was official selection in Un Certain Regard at the Cannes International Film Festival in 1995. Biswaprakash was his second film that was also screened at several international festivals and won Silver Lotus for Best Oriya Film in the National Film Awards in 2000. Dharini is his third feature film that was made both in Hindi and Odia. He also made three documentaries, Dhenkanal – A Multifaceted Paradise, Samarpanam on the eminent Bharat Natyam dancer Malavika Sarukkai and Pearls of Wisdom on Oriya Literature for the Children’s Film Society, India.

== Filmography ==
- Nischal Badal (1989)
- Indradhanur Chaai (1993)
- Dhenkanal – A Multifaceted Paradise(1995)
- Samarpanam (1997)
- Biswaprakash (1999)
- Dharini (2002)
- Pearls of Wisdom (2003)
- Joseph – Born in Grace (2019)
