= Uma Dogra =

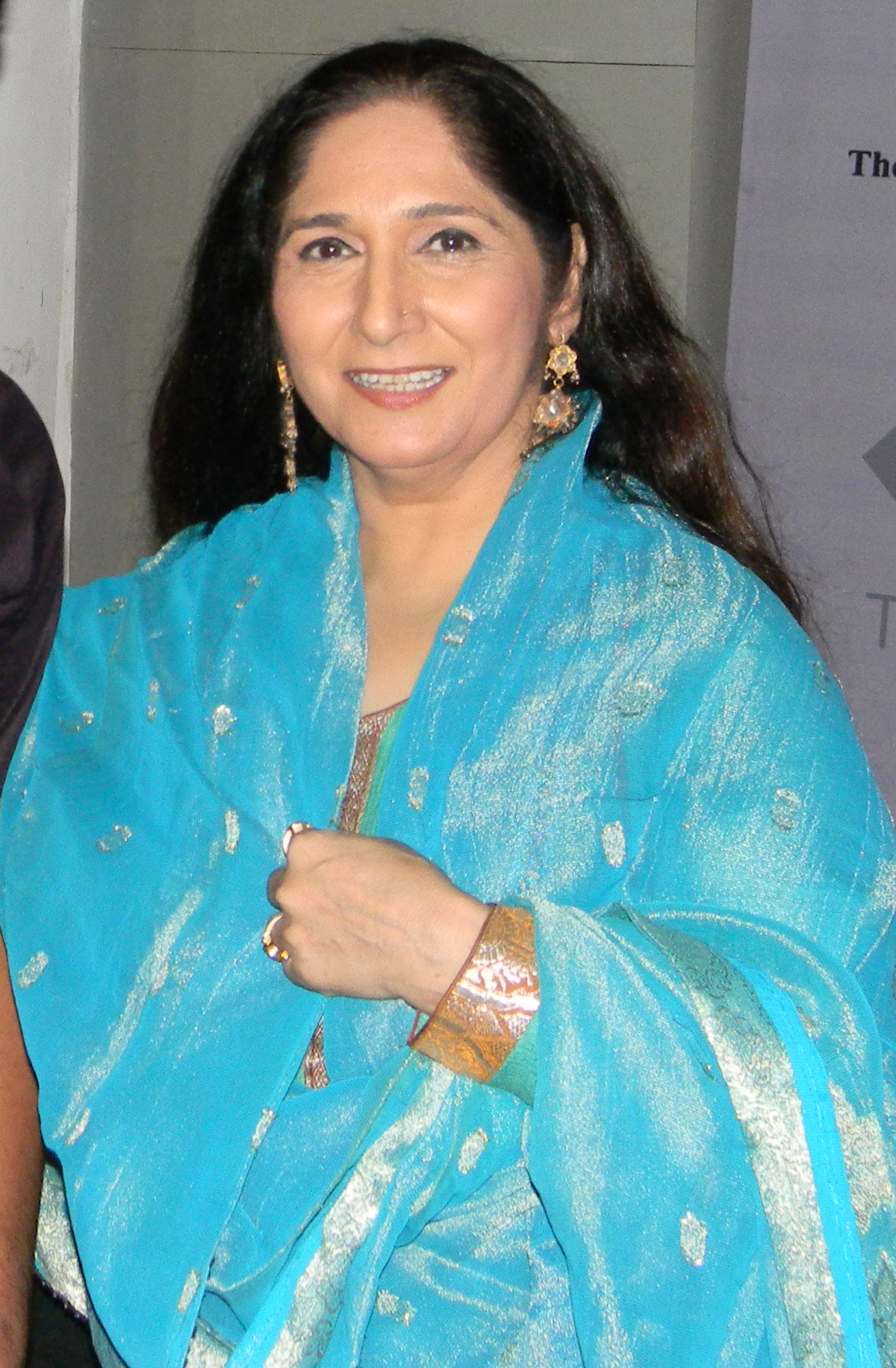

Background information
- Born: 23 April 1957 (age 69); New Delhi, India
- Genre: Indian Classical Dance
- Occupations: Kathak Dancer, Teacher, Choreographer, Promoter, Organizer
- Years active: 1972
- Website: umadogra.com

Uma Dogra (born 23 April 1957) is an Indian exponent of Kathak, an Indian Classical Dance form. She is the senior most disciple of Pt. Durga Lal, the Kathak Maestro from Jaipur Gharana. She is a Kathak soloist, a choreographer and a teacher. She has been performing in India and abroad for more than 40 years.

== Early life ==
She was born to Motiram and Shakuntala Sharma in Malviya Nagar in New Delhi. Uma began to dance at the age of 7 . She initially trained under Guru Bansilal and then Reba Vidyarthi at Kathak Kendra National Institute of Kathak Dance New Delhi. Later she joined Jaipur Gharana, Pt. Durga Lal. She was trained in Hindustani Classical Vocal under her father Pt. Motiram Sharma who was a sitar player and a disciple of Pt. Ravi Shankar.

== Career ==
Uma Dogra is a ganda bandh shagird of Pt. Durga Lal. She learned Kathak under Reba Vidyarthi and Pt. Birju Maharaj from 1969 to 1972. From 1972 to 1984 she learned Kathak under guru Pt. Durga Lal and danced in productions SBKK, Ramleela, Surdaas, Shah-ne-Mughal. She moved to Bombay in 1984 and worked with Hema Malini in Nritya Bharati, Nupur serial and Ballet Meera. She worked with Asha Parekh in serial Jhankaar.

Uma Dogra established the Sam Ved Society for Performing Arts in 1990 to promote Indian performing arts. Under its banner, for the last 25 years she has been organizing two festivals in Mumbai's cultural calendar. The first one, the Pt. Durga Lal Festival, takes place in the first half of the year. It has seen the who's who from the field of music, dance and theater perform. In the year 2020, the Festival completed 30 years. The second, the Raindrops Festival of Indian Classical Dance is held in July with the aim to give a platform to the upcoming soloists. She has participated in many other festivals such as Khajuraho Dance Festival, Margazhi festival. She conducts classes in Kathak at the Uma Dogra School of Kathak in Mumbai. She has trained several students, including Kathak soloist Tina Tambe, Bollywood actress Sonam Kapoor, and television actress Rachana Parulkar.

When the dancers goes on stage, they are not portraying Hinduism or Islam, this thing or that thing. It's an expression of your own life, your own thinking and your own wisdom.

— Uma Dogra

She has won several local, regional and national awards, including Sangeet Natak Akademi Award in 2014.

On 18 May 2016, Uma performed with Indian Folk exponent Geetanjali Sharma in a monthlong cultural festival Ujjain Simhastha.

== Personal life ==
Uma Dogra is married to National Award-winning Director Chitrartha Singh. They have one daughter, Suhani Singh writer & journalist in India Today and a son Manas Singh an actor turned sports presenter. Uma is settled in Mumbai, where she had a dispute with the society for alleged illegal use of her house for commercial purpose without society's permission. "The neighbours are disturbed because of the noise and have given us written complaints," said the society chairman.

== Books ==
She has written a book "In Praise of Kathak" about her journey as a dancer and the techniques of Kathak. This book was released by Member of Parliament Hema Malini on 30 January 2015 at Samved's Rajat Jayanti Mahotsav.

== Discography ==
Nirvana Through Dance – A film which was produced to celebrate the life and achievements of Uma's Guru Pt. Durga Lal.

== School of Kathak ==
Uma Dogra's School of Kathak is run by Uma Dogra in Mumbai. Its activities include classroom teaching, workshops, master classes, performances, seminars and festivals.
