= Shayar-e-Kashmir Mahjoor =

- Directed by: Prabhat Mukherjee
- Starring: parikshat sahni (Mahjoor), Balraj Sahni ( Mahjoor's Father), Pran Kishore, Mohammad Yousuf Qureshi (Judge),
- Music by: Prem Dhawan
- Release date: 1972
- Running time: 2 hours 33 min
- Country: India
- Language: Hindi

Shayar-e-Kashmir Mahjoor (Hindi: शेर-ए-कश्मीर महजूर, Urdu: شاعرِ کشمیر مہجور) is a 1972 Bollywood biographical drama film directed by Prabhat Mukherjee. The film stars Balraj Sahni, Parikshat Sahni, Pran Kishore and Mohammad Yousuf Qureshi, famous Kathak dancer Geetanjali Desai.

The film is a biography of Kashmiri poet Ghulam Ahmed Mahjoor.
