= Indradhanura Chhai =

1993 Odia film directed by Susant Mishra

- Directed by: Susant Misra
- Written by: Susant Misra
- Produced by: Orissa Film Development Corporation& Jugala Debata
- Starring: Robin Das; Surya Mohanty; Soniya Mohapatra; Bijainee Misra
- Cinematography: Jugala Debata
- Edited by: Chakradhar Sahu
- Music by: Vikash Das
- Distributed by: Visual Link Pvt. Ltd.
- Release date: 1993
- Running time: 110 minutes
- Country: India
- Language: Odia

Indradhanura Chhai is a 1993 Indian Oriya film directed by Susant Misra. This film reflects the traditional structures of social and family life of a small town in India are growing strongly affected by the progressive urbanization of the country. Three generations of women see their perception of human nature to evolve, as their personal relationships. In their loneliness, they face problems of tradition, culture, religion and manage gender relations. Gradual urbanization and its consequences affect the traditional, social and family structures in a growing small town in India. The story explores the multidimensional conflicts of three women of different generations, their changing perceptions about human nature and personal relationships. Their lonely moments are highlighted in the context of the inexorable flow of time amidst issues of tradition, culture, religion and man-woman relationships.

== Synopsis ==
The film looks at the lives of three women living in Bhubaneshwar. Vijaya's husband died a few days after their wedding and she is trying to cope with her feelings for a kind, local teacher. Her friend, Sonia, is caught between modernity and traditional notions of female virtue while Aunt Nila has difficulty in facing up to getting old.

== Cast ==
- Robin Das as Pratap
- Vijayani Mishra as Vijaya
- Sonia Mohapatra as Sonia
- Surya Mohanty as Sales Representative
- Deba Das as Deb
- Muktabala Rautray as Widow
- Anjana Chowdhury

== Crew ==
- Susant Misra - Director
- Susant Misra - Story & Screenplay
- Jugala Debata - Producer
- Chakradhar Sahu - Editor
- Devdas Chhotray - Dialogue
- Jugala Debata - Director of Photography
- Vikash Das - Music
- Asim Basu - Art Director
- Himanshu Shekhar Khatur - Sound

== Music ==
Vikash Das has arranged music for this film.

== Review ==
Susant Mishra's Indradhanura Chhai (Shadows of the Rainbow ) shows how urbanization and the consequent rise of modern consumerism have affected the traditional social and family structures in Bhubaneswar. Against the backdrop of this changing cityscape, Indradhanura Chhai explores the multidimensional conflicts of its characters, their changing perceptions about human nature and personal relationships. With hypnotic visual rhythms, Susant Mishra shows the lives of three women living in the modernizing town of Bhubaneswar, its skyline dominated by magnificent temple architecture.

== Awards & participation ==
- Sochi International Film Festival, Russia (1995) -Grand Prix for the Best Feature Film
- National Film Awards, India (1994) -Special Jury award
- Cannes Film Festival, (1995) - Official Selection in Un Certain Regard
- Orissa State Film Awards, (1994) - Best Direction, Best Dialogues & Screenplay, Best Supporting Actress and Special Jury Award
- Cairo International Film Festival
- Rotterdam International Film Festival
- Moscow International Film Festival
- International Film Festival for Nouveau Cinema, Montreal
- Festival at Institute Lumiere, Paris
- Screened as the Closing Film of the Indomania "100 Years of Indian Cinema" Celebration in Paris
- 1st Bhubaneswar Film Festival
