= Manik Jodi =

- Directed by: Prabhat Mukherjee
- Written by: Bhanja Kishor Patnaik
- Produced by: Dhira Biswal
- Music by: Balakrishna Das
- Release date: 1963
- Country: India
- Language: Odia

Manik Jodi (1963) is an Oriya film directed by Prabhat Mukherjee

== Cast ==
- Urabashi Joshi
- Akshaya Mohanty Kashyap
- Sukhalata Mohanty
- Mayadhara Raut
- Sahu Samuel

Jatin Das Ananta Mohapatra Gita Dutta

== Lyrics ==
- Pramod Panigrahi
