= Kokila Devi =

Kokila Devi (1896-1936) was an Indian writer in Odia language, known for her work titled Bilasini, based on widow remarriage.

== Works ==
- Devi, Kokila; Mohanty, Sachidananda (2000). "Bilasini". Indian Literature. 44 (2 (196)): 19–22. ISSN 0019-5804. (translated from Odia)

== See also ==
- List of Odia writers
