= Six Acres and a Third =

19th-century Oriya-language novel

Chha Maana Atha Guntha
- The front page of the novel (original version)
- Author: Fakir Mohan Senapati
- Translator: Rabi Shankar Mishra, Satya P. Mohanty, Jatindra K. Nayak, and Paul St-Pierre
- Language: Odia language
- Genre: Allegory
- Publication date: 1897-1899
- Publication place: India

Chha Maana Atha Guntha (Odia: ଛ ମାଣ ଆଠ ଗୁଣ୍ଠ, transl. Six Acres and a Third) is a 19th-century Indian novel in the Odia language by Fakir Mohan Senapati (1843–1918), published in an English language translation by the University of California Press. Written long before Russia's October Revolution, it is the first Indian novel to deal with the exploitation of landless peasants by a feudal Lord in British India. Its author is known as the "Father of Modern Odia Literature".

== Overview ==
Fakir Mohan Senapati's novel Chha Mana Atha Guntha, or Six Acres and a Third is set in colonial Indian society during the early decades of the 19th century. It tells a tale of wealth and greed, of property and theft. On one level it is the story of an evil landlord, Ramachandra Mangaraj, who exploits poor peasants and uses the new legal system to appropriate the property of others. But this is merely one of the themes of the novel; as the text unfolds, it reveals several layers of meaning and implication. Toward the end of Mangaraj's story, he is punished by the law and we hear how the "Judge Sahib" ordered that his landed estate, his "zamindari," be taken away. It is sold to a lawyer, who — as rumor in the village has it — "will come with ten palanquins followed by five horses and two hundred foot-soldiers" to take possession of Mangaraj's large estate. The ordinary villagers react to this news by reminding one another of an old saying: "O horse, what difference does it make to you if you are stolen by a thief? You do not get much to eat here; you will not get much to eat there. No matter who becomes the next master, we will remain his slaves. We must look after our own interests." Fakir Mohan Senapati's novel is written from the perspective of the horse, the ordinary villager, and the foot-soldier — in other words, the labouring poor of the world. Although it contains a critique of British colonial rule, the novel offers a powerful indictment of many other forms of social and political authority as well. What makes Six Acres unusual is that its critical vision is embodied in its narrative style or mode, in the complex way the novel is narrated and organized as a literary text. Senapati's novel (the Oriya original was serialized in 1897-1899 and published as a book in 1902) is justly seen as representing the apex of the tradition of literary realism in 19th century Indian literature. But its realism is complex and sophisticated, not simply mimetic; the novel seeks to analyze and explain social reality instead of merely holding up a mirror to it.

The linguistic innovations of Six Acres and a Third, Senapati's first novel, need to be appreciated in this wider context. These innovations changed Oriya literature forever, and inaugurated the age of modern Oriya prose, but they are based in a vision of social equality and cultural self-determination. Senapati was no romantic nationalist, and his conception of language was based on his progressive social vision. In his prose works, he sought to popularize an egalitarian literary medium that was sensitive enough to draw on the rich idioms of ordinary Oriyas, the language of the paddy fields and the village markets. If he saw the imposition of other languages like Persian, English, or Bengali on Oriyas as a form of linguistic colonialism, it is because he considered the interests of Oriyas — much like the interests of any linguistic community — to be tied to democratic cultural and social access to power.

== Comparative study with the other 19th century Indian novels ==
An international conference entitled "The Literary View from Below", held in Delhi (January 3–5, 2007), was organised by the DCRC, Delhi University, "Fakir Mohan Senapati" Project, USA and the South Asian Program of Cornell University. It brought the three perspectives to bear on Fakir Mohan Senapati's Oriya novel Six Acres and a Third. The two panel discussions that flanked the conference addressed the central question of language in Indian literature. Senapati's novel, panelists such as Namwar Singh, Harish Trivedi, Manoranjan Mohanty, G. K. Das and Chaman Lal (Delhi), Amiya Dev (Kolkata), V. Narayan Rao and Satya P. Mohanty (U.S.) argued, was a play on languages. While Namwar Singh resisted the Bakhtinian implications of this thesis, all agreed that the novel could be read as a cautionary account of the process whereby a rich heteroglossia was giving way to an impoverished monolingualism, designated by the nationalist shift to the concept of the mother tongue.

To Rao, the novel along with Gurujada's Telugu play Kanyasulkam, a new English rendering of which is due out shortly from Indiana University Press, was crucial to a quest for an alternative modernity, premised not on reform, as in Bankim and Tagore, but on a playful parody of all forms of domination. Satya P. Mohanty reiterated the theme during the closing panel. He further outlined the epistemic dimensions of the parody and satire employed in Senapati's novel by showing how they irradiated the view from below.

The four sessions of the conference demonstrated the triad of rubrics guiding the deliberations. Under the interpretative rubric Ananta Giri of the Madras Institute of Development Studies, Sachidnanda Mohanty of the University of Hyderabad and Diptiranjan Pattanaik of Utkal University read the decolonising agenda of the novel in terms as different as "transformative critique", "narrative irony" and a form of non-engagement best described as "upanishadic." The same interpretative lens focused on gender elicited sharply polarised views on Senapati's construction of woman. Bidyut Mohanty and Savita Singh dwelt on Senapati's breaking of the feminine mystique through the projection of the stronger woman. Pragati Mahapatra, however, saw signs of a new patriarchy in Senapati's holding on to the angel-witch polarity. If a central issue in translation studies is local cultural adaptation, then Senapati's novel justly exemplifies this. It not only travels across languages; it also freely mistranslates in an effort to localise. G.J.V. Prasad of JNU traced this pervasive practice as far back as the ancient Tamil text, Tolkapiyam, where it exists under the name, "mori-preyarti". The name catches the spirit if not the letter of translation as the word is understood today. It refers to "Tamilakam", the "infusion of the Tamil spirit into a deserving text", something that serves as an analogue for Senapati's "oriyanising". Sudish Pachauri of Delhi University ably showed that this quality carried across by reading from Nawalpuri's 1959 Hindi translation of the novel.

== See also ==
- Oriya literature
- Rebati
