= Stree (1968 film) =

- Audio artwork
- Directed by: Siddhartha (Gour Prasad Ghose, Parbati Ghose, & Ram Chandra Thakur)
- Written by: Shrabani (Parbati Ghose)
- Produced by: Parbati Ghose
- Starring: Gour Prasad Ghose; Parbati Ghose; Leela Dulali
- Cinematography: Shanti Dutt
- Edited by: Ramesh Joshi
- Music by: Bhubaneswar Misra
- Release date: 17 May 1968
- Running time: 158 min
- Country: India
- Language: Odia
- Budget: INR 1,87,000

Stree is a 1968 Odia film directed by "Siddhartha", which is a pseudonym for Gour Prasad Ghose, Parbati Ghose, and Ram Chandra Thakur.

== Synopsis ==
One day Anuaradha and her brother, a medical doctor, find a young man, Debabrata, unconsciousness in the tides by the sea shore and bring him home. With treatment by her brother and her care, Debabrata gets well. Anuradha and Debabrata fall in love. Her brother, Prasanna, gets them married and sees off the couple to Debarata's home. Upo arriving Anuradha discovers Debabrata is actually a widower and has a son. She feels betrayed but as a devoted loving wife overcomes the feeling and gets along with all of Debabrata's family members in the big house. Gradually she gets close to Debrabrata too and takes care of his son as her own. Debabrata's sister Bhanu can't accept Anuradha and creates misunderstanding between wife and husband. At last biased Debabrata leaves the house with his son leaving his wife Anuradha behind. But Anuradha doesn't lose hope. With her determination, sacrifice and devotion, they reunite in the end.

== Cast ==
- Gour Prasad Ghose - Debabrata
- Parbati Ghose - Anuradha
- Jadunath Das Mahapatra
- Anima Pedini - Mother
- Leela Dulali - Bhanu
- Dinabandhu Das
- Shyamalendu Bhatacharjee
- Sujata Anand
- Sekhar Bose
- Gokulananda Parida
- Kunjanada Sahu
- Swarup Nayak

== Soundtrack ==
The music for the film is composed by Bhubanseswar Misra.

Song	Lyrics	Singer(s)
"Sanja Sakale Tuma Chhabi Khoje"	Narayan Prasad Singh	Nirmala Mishra
"Jhumi Jhumi Aase Aakhi"	Narayan Prasad Singh	Sujata Mukherjee, Akshaya Mohanty
"Mo Aakhira Kete Katha Mo Manara Nirabata"	Sarada Naik	Sandhya Mukherjee,
"Tuma Bina Ei Raati Bhala Lagen"	Narayan Prasad Singh	Nirmala Mishra, Pranab Patnaik
"Tume Jyadi Saathi Mora Nia Mote Bhulai"	Narayan Prasad Singh	Nirmala Mishra
"Kali Juga Krushna Muhin Tu Mo Heroine"	Swaroop Naik	Akshaya Mohanty
"Biti Jae Re"		
"Ganga Je Deshe"		

== Trivia ==
The film's director, music composer and heroine have pseudonym names.

Role	Pseudonym	Real name
Director	Siddharth	(Ram Chandra Thakur, Gour Prasad Ghose & Parbati Ghose)
Music composer	Srikumar	Bhubneswar Misra
Actress	Chandana	Parbati Ghose

== Box office ==
The film was made on a budget of INR 1,87,000.00. The film was declared as a box office hit.

== Awards ==
- National Film Awards 1968
  - President's silver medal for Best Odia film.
