= Amari Gaan Jhua =

- Directed by: Binaya Banarjee
- Release date: 1953
- Country: India
- Language: Odia

Amari Gaan Jhua (1953) is an Ollywood / Oriya film directed by Binaya Banarjee.

== Cast ==
- Gopal Banarjee
- Parbati Ghose
- Durlabh
- Gaura Ghosh
- Chapala Nayak
- Bhanumati Devi

== Soundtrack ==
1. "Pahili Ashadha Ra Ashanta Badala Tu Re"
