= Bhai Bhai (1956 Odia film) =

- Directed by: Nitai Palit
- Written by: Santanu Kumar Das
- Produced by: Gour Prasad Ghose
- Starring: Gour Prasad Ghose; Parbati Ghose; Samuel Sahu; Gopal Banerjee; Hemant Das
- Cinematography: Denen Gupta
- Edited by: Biswanath Nayak
- Music by: Balakrishna Das; Bhubaneswar Misra
- Production company: Dalit Jatisangha Chitram
- Release date: 21 June 1956
- Running time: 151 minutes
- Country: India
- Language: Odia

Bhai Bhai is a 1956 Oriya film produced by Gour Prasad Ghose and directed by Nitai Palit. The film was inspired by a book, Bhai Bhai, written by Santanu Kumar Das. It was produced under the banner of Dalit Jatisangha Chitram, and received financial assistance from the Government of Orissa, India. It portrays the problems of untouchability and the caste system prevailing at that time in rural India.

The film starred Parbati Ghose, the first female filmmaker from Odisha

== Plot ==
In a village there are two sections of people leaving nearby. The upper cast people belongs to the Pradhans and the lower caste belongs to the Bauris. The Pradhan community are influential and landlords. The Bauri community are cultivation labourers, they work in the lands of the Pradhans. Bauris are treated as untouchable. Suduria is head of the village and is of upper caste. He is broad-minded and does not believe in untouchability. He has a soft corner for one Nidhi, who belongs to the Bauri caste. Nidhi calls Suduria affectionately as brother. Bana, who is from the Pradhan community, does not accept the daring of one of lower community to maintain a relationship with one of the upper caste. He calls a meeting in the village and asks for punishment to Nidhi for maintaining a relationship with one of the upper caste. The village people decide to punish Nidhi for his crime and bar him from working on the land and taking water from the pond. Though Suduria is against the decision, he remains silent against the voice of the Pradhan community. The lower caste Bauri community feels harassed by the decision and decides not to work in the field of the Pradhan community. Without labourers, the cultivation work has got stopped and the land becomes barren. At last, the Pradhan community realises their fault and accepts the relationship of Suduria and Nidhi.

== Cast ==
- Gour Prasad Ghose
- Gopal Banarjee
- Parbati Ghose (Chapala Nayak)
- Sahu Samuel
- Beena Palit
- Hemanta Das
- Lila Dulali

== Soundtrack ==
1. "Kehi Ki Dekhichha Palli Ma Ra Hasa Ra"
2. "Rama Je Laikhana Ho Gale Mruga Mari"
