= Parbati Ghose =

Oriya actor, director, producer

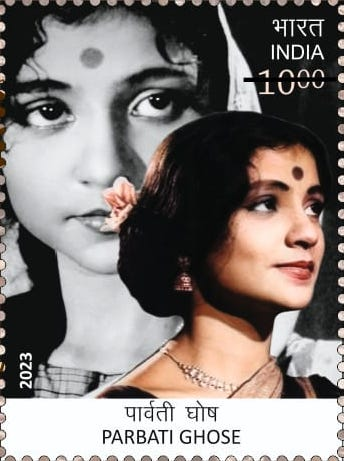
- Ghose on a 2023 stamp of India
- Born: Chapala Nayak; 28 March 1942; Cuttack district, British India
- Died: 12 February 2018 (aged 75); Bhubaneswar, Odisha, India
- Education: Sanat Nalini Girls High School, Cuttack
- Occupations: Actress; film director; Film producer
- Years active: 1949–2012
- Known for: First female filmmaker of Odisha
- Notable work: Lakshmi (1962 film); Kaa (1965 film); Stree (1968 film)
- Spouse: Gour Prasad Ghose

Parbati Ghose (born Chapala Nayak; 28 March 1942 – 12 February 2018) was an Indian actress, film director and film producer. Ghose was the first female filmmaker from the state of Odisha.

== Early life ==
Ghose, who was one of eight siblings, was born as Chapala Nayak on 28 March 1933 in Manasinghpatana, Cuttack district, British India. Her father, Basudev Naik, managed the Manmohan Press, a prominent book publisher. Ghose attended Sanat Nalini Girls High School. She also trained as a dancer under Kelucharan Mohapatra, Dayal Sharma, and Suresh Routray.

== Career ==
Ghose began her career as a child voice actor on All India Radio before transitioning to on-screen film roles. She made her film debut as child artist of character Nila Madhav in 1949 film, Shri Jagannath. Her big break came in the 1953 film Amari Gaan Jhua (Our Village Girl), where she was cast as the female lead actress. Amari Gaan Jhua, which explored the controversial practice of child marriage, won her positive reviews.

In 1956, Ghose appeared as the lead actress in the successful Odia language film, Bhai Bhai, alongside her future husband, Gour Prasad Ghose, who was also the producer. Bhai Bhai, which showcased her prowess as a lead actress, greatly increased her profile in the Indian film industry. It also led to her interest in film directing and production. Thereafter Ghose appeared in Maa in 1959, also produced by Gour Prasad Ghose.

Parbati Ghose and her husband produced, co-directed and acted in Lakshmi (1962), Kaa (1965), Stree (1968). These three films won them three national film awards for their work as directors and producers. A few years later, she produced and directed Chha Mana Atha Guntha in 1986. She had worked in Hindi and Bengali language Telefilms like 'Prashna' and 'Sopan'. She also appeared in Sansaar in 1971.

Her last film as a director and producer was Salabega in 1998.

== Filmography ==
- Shri Jagannath (1949) (child artist)
- Amari Gaan Jhua (1953)
- Bhai Bhai (1956)
- Maa (1959) (produced)
- Lakshmi (1962) (produced, co-directed and acted)
- Kaa (1965) (produced, co-directed and acted)
- Stree (1968) (produced, co-directed and acted)
- Sansara (1971)
- Chha Mana Atha Guntha (1986) (produced and directed)
- Salabega (1998) (produced and directed)
- Prashna (telefilm)
- Sopan (telefilm)

== Personal life ==
In 1959, she married Gourprasad Ghose and adopted the name Parbati Ghose, given to her by her new in-laws.

== Death ==
Ghose died on 12 February 2018, at the age of 84 in Bhubaneswar. The state government of Odisha held a state funeral in her honor. Naveen Patnaik, the Chief Minister of Orissa, paid tribute to Parbati Ghose and her contributions to the local and national film industry, noting that "She was an actor, director and producer at the same time. In early days of Odia cinema, she single-handedly uplifted it to a new level. She is considered as a symbol of women's empowerment when an idea like empowerment was unheard of. Her departure is a great loss to our industry and the world of silver screen. She will always be remembered for her contribution to Odia cinema."
