= Durga Lal =

Pandit Durga Lal
- Born: 1948
- Died: 21 January 1990 (aged 41–42)
- Occupation: Kathak dancer
- Children: 2

Pandit Durga Lal (1948 - 21 January 1990) was a renowned Kathak dancer of the Jaipur Gharana. He was born in Mahendragarh, Rajasthan. He is known for playing the main role in the 1989 dance drama Ghanashyam, the featured music composed by Pandit Ravi Shankar and was produced by Birmingham Opera Company. He received the Sangeet Natak Akademi Award in 1984.

Lal was a disciple of Sunder Prasadji. Along with being a Kathak dancer he was also a singer and would play Pakhvaj. He taught Kathak at the National Institute of Kathak Dance (Kathak Kendra), New Delhi. Lal's brother Pandit Devi Lal was also a renowned Kathak dancer. Devi Lal's wife Geetanjali Lal is also a Sangeet Natak Akademi Award winner (2007). Both brothers died at an early age.

After Durga Lal's death his children and other art fraternity members organised the annual Pandit Durga Lal Memorial Festival. In 2021, the festival was in its 31st season.

Pandit Durgalal's disciples include renowned dancers Uma Dogra, Jayant Kastuar and Mangala Bhatt amongst others. Nighat Chaodhry is Pandit Lal's notable student in Pakistan.

In memory of Lal, Dogra had arranged the "Pandit Durga Lal Samaroh" for more than 15 years as of 2005. She also made the documentary Nirvana Through Dance on him. Mangala Bhatt through her dance school Aakruti Kathak Kendra curates and organises "Antarang" every year in memory of Pt.Durga Lal Ji.

== Early life ==
Pandit Durgalal was born in 1948 in Mahendragarh, Rajasthan. He took his formal training in kathak from Pandit Sunder Prasad. He was the brother-in-law of a famous kathak dancer, Geetanjali Lal. He has two children, elder daughter Nupur and younger son Mohit. Nupur is a Kathak performer and vocalist and Mohit is a percussionist.

== Awards ==
- Padma Shri Award
- Sangeet Natak Akademi Award
