= Sri Jagannath (film) =

1950 Indian Odia-language film

Shri Jagannatha
- Directed by: Chitta Ranjan Mitra
- Produced by: Roopa Bharati
- Starring: Gopal Chandra Ghosh; Gloria Rout; Chapala Nayak; Rama Chandra Mania
- Distributed by: Roopa Bharati
- Release date: 1950
- Country: India
- Language: Odia

Shri Jagannatha is a 1950 Indian Oriya film directed by Chitta Ranjan Mitra.

== Story ==
The story is about Jagannath's existence at Nila Parvata in the form of Nilamadhav.

== Cast ==
- Gopal Chandra Ghosh... Bidyapati
- Gloria Rout... Lalita
- Chapala Nayak... Nila
- Rama Chandra Mania... Bishwabasu

== Credits ==
- Director: Chitta Ranjan Mitra
- Producer: Roopa Bharati
- Writers: Ashwini Kumar Ghosh
- Screenplay: Gopal Chhotray
- Music: Ranajit Rai & Balakrishna Dash
- Lyrics: Surendra Kumar Das, Krushna Prasad Basu, Nikunja Kishor Das

== Songs ==
- "Nila Sindhu Tire Nila Achala"
- "Ho, Aja Bane Mausuma"
- "Piyasi-re Nira Khoje Khira Debi Muhin"
- "Katha-tie Kahun"
