= Suryamukhi =

1963 Odia film

Suryamukhi(1963)
- Directed by: Prafulla Sengupta
- Written by: Gurukrushna Goswami; Saumendra Misra
- Produced by: Saumendra Misra
- Starring: Saumendra Misra; Minati Mishra; Sukhalata Mohanty; Dhira Biswal
- Cinematography: Kanai Dey
- Edited by: Sukumar Sengupta
- Music by: Shantanu Mahapatra
- Production company: Uday Pictures
- Release date: 2 October 1963
- Country: India
- Language: Odia

Suryamukhi is a 1963 Oriya film directed by Prafulla Sengupta.

== Plot ==
Raju lives with his brother Mohan and mother in a remote village. Gita and Raju love each other. As Raju is a brilliant student, he goes to Cuttack for higher education. There, he meets Usha, his classmate. Usha is inspired by the honesty, simplicity and intellect of Raju and falls in love with him. But Usha's father Rai Bahadur, a wealthy person in the town, doesn't accept his daughter's love interest with a poor village boy. Rai Bahadur insults Raju and threatens him to leave Usha's life. In desperation, Raju leaves Cuttack and ventures into an unknown journey. In the meanwhile, Raju's widowed mother sends Loknath and Mohan to search the whereabouts of Raju. Loknath meets Rai Bahadur, who happens to be his old friend, but can't trace out Raju. Lokanath pursues Rai Bahadur a proposal of Mohan's marriage with Usha. Rai Bahadur agrees. Mohan and Usha's marriage takes place.

Raju eventually finds a job in a factory and one day loses his eyes in an accident. By knowing this, his mother gets terrible blow and passes away. Raju is admitted into a hospital and becomes fully cured. Raju returns home and surprisingly finds his girlfriend Usha is now his sister-in-law. Later, Usha convinces Raju to face the reality and asks him to marry Gita. At last, Raju agrees to marry Gita, with a happy ending.

== Cast ==
- Saumendra Misra as Raju
- Minati Mishra as Usha
- Sukhalata Mohanty as Gita
- Dhira Biswal as Lokanath
- Ananta Mahapatra as Debasis
- Laxmipriya Mahapatra as Odishi dancer
- Sahu Samuel as Mohan
- Bimal Choudhury as Rai Bahadur
- Lakshmi as Raju's mother

== Soundtrack ==
The music for the film is composed by Shantunu Mahapatra.

Song	Lyrics	Singer(s)
"Antara Kande Bahare Hase Sei Mora Parichaya"	Gurukrushna Goswami	Pranab Patnaik
"Duniare Samayara Naee Bahi Jaere"	Gurukrushna Goswami	Manna Dey
"Sei Chuna Chuna Tara Phula Aaji"	Gurukrushna Goswami	Lata Mangeshkar
"Sei Nila Pari Deshe Janhi Chandarama Hase"	Gurukrushna Goswami	Sikandar Alam, Nirmla Mishra
"Niladri Bihari Hari"		

== Box office ==
The film was appreciated by the masses and was a success.

== Awards ==
- 10th National Film Awards 1962
- National Film Award for Best Feature Film in Oriya
