= Centre for Cultural Resources and Training =

Autonomous organisation under Government of India

The Centre for Cultural Resources and Training (CCRT) is autonomous organisation under Ministry of Culture of Government of India. Established in May 1979, to support cultural education, with its inception it took over the Scheme-Propagation of Culture among College and School students, which was being implemented by Delhi University since 1970, where a Research and Production Cell was functioning for this purpose.

== Overview ==
The CCRT also

- organises activities such as school tours to museums, monuments and craft centres
- collects teaching resources including photographs, audio recordings, films and software
- publishes materials to promote understanding of Indian art and culture
- has a "Cultural Talent Search Scholarship Scheme" for children aged 10–14, to help them develop their abilities in cultural fields especially rarer forms of art
- presents annual "CCRT Teachers' Awards"
