= Lakshmi (1962 film) =

- Directed by: SP Naik under the technical supervision of Binoy Banerjee
- Produced by: Gour Ghose & Parbati Ghose
- Starring: Chandana Banerjee, Gaura Ghosh and Sahu Samuel
- Music by: Balakrishna Das
- Release date: 1962
- Country: India
- Language: Odia

Lakshmi (1962) is an Ollywood / Oriya film directed by SP Naik, under the technical supervision of Binoy Banerjee

== Cast ==
- Gour Prasad Ghose
- Parbati Ghose
- Dayanidhi Das

== Awards ==
National Film Awards

- 1962: Certificate of Merit for Second Best Feature Film in Oriya
