= Bhai Bhauja =

- Directed by: Sarathi
- Starring: Sarat Pujari; Pira Misra; Samuel Sahul; Minati Mishra; Manimala
- Distributed by: Rupanjali
- Release date: 1967
- Country: India
- Language: Odia

Bhai Bhauja is a 1967 Indian Oriya film directed by Sarathi, based on a story of Rama Chandra Misra. It depicts the story of a farmer and the cruel landlord (Sahukar).

== Synopsis ==
Manu Pradhani is a farmer, and lives with his wife Dukhi and brother Bhaiga. Manu and Bhaiga work hard to sustain their family. Manu mortgaged his land to the Landlord (Sahukar). Every year they repay the loan with grain with a hope to release their land from Sahukar in a few years. in the meanwhile, Sahukar's son kills his father by the assistance of local goons and succeed to prove in the court that Manu killed his father. The court sentences innocent Manu to ten years imprisonment. Dukhi and his brother-in-law struggle hard to survive. Dukhi forgets everything to raise his son Prakash. After ten years, while returning from jail, Manu believes a rumor that his wife and his brother Bhaiga have developed an illicit relationship. In frustration, Manu remains in the city and works as a servant in a judge's house. In the meantime, Praksh and the Judge's daughter Sabitri fall in love with each other. But Bhaiga doesn't approve of the relationship. To settle the crises, Manu returns to the village without his knowledge that Prakash is his son. When he meets Dukhi and Bhaiga, all of his suspicions are cleared and everybody approves of the marriage of Prakash and Sabitri.

== Cast ==
- Sarat Pujari – Prakash
- Rama Chandra Pratihari – Manu
- Samuel Sahu – Bhaiga
- Manimala – Dukhi
- Minati Mishra – Sabitri
