= Saptasajya (1950 film) =

1950 film

- Directed by: Kalyan Gupta
- Produced by: Ratikant Nayak
- Music by: Udaya Nath Sahu
- Release date: 1950
- Country: India
- Language: Odia

Saptasajya (transl. Seven beds) is a 1950 Ollywood/Oriya film directed by Kalyan Gupta.

== Cast ==
- Giridhari
- Pankaj Nanda
- Ratikant Nayak
- Anima Pedini
- Kishori Rajendra
- Kamala Sen
- Byomkesh Tripathi
- Bhagaban Mohanty
- Tunia

== Soundtrack ==
1. "Rangi Dhana Kie Luti Neichi Lo Bata Re"
