= Naari (film) =

- Directed by: Narendra Kumar Mitra & B. Trilochan
- Produced by: Narendra Kumar Mitra
- Music by: Kali Charan Pattanayak
- Release date: 1963
- Running time: 122 min
- Country: India
- Language: Odia

Naari is an Oriya film directed by Narendra Kumar Mitra and B. Trilochan and released on 25 January 1963. Film won National Film Award for Best Feature Film in Odia.

== Plot ==
Jayanta is in love with Manashi and prepares to marry her. But before the wedding, he loses his sight. Then Manashi breaks off the engagement, leaving Jayantha disappointed.

During the treatment, Jayant is noticed by the kind nurse Malati. Trying to help him, she tries to return Manashi to him, but fails. She then pretends to be Manashi herself. And even donates one of his eyes to him.

Having regained his sight, Jayanta first tries to find Manashi. However, after learning the truth from the servant, he goes to Malati to save her from suicide at the last moment.

== Cast ==
- Aneema
- Ashok
- Durlabh
