= Fakir Mohan Senapati =

Indian Odia author

Utkala Byasa Kabi Fakir Mohan Senapati
- ଫକୀର ମୋହନ ସେନାପତି
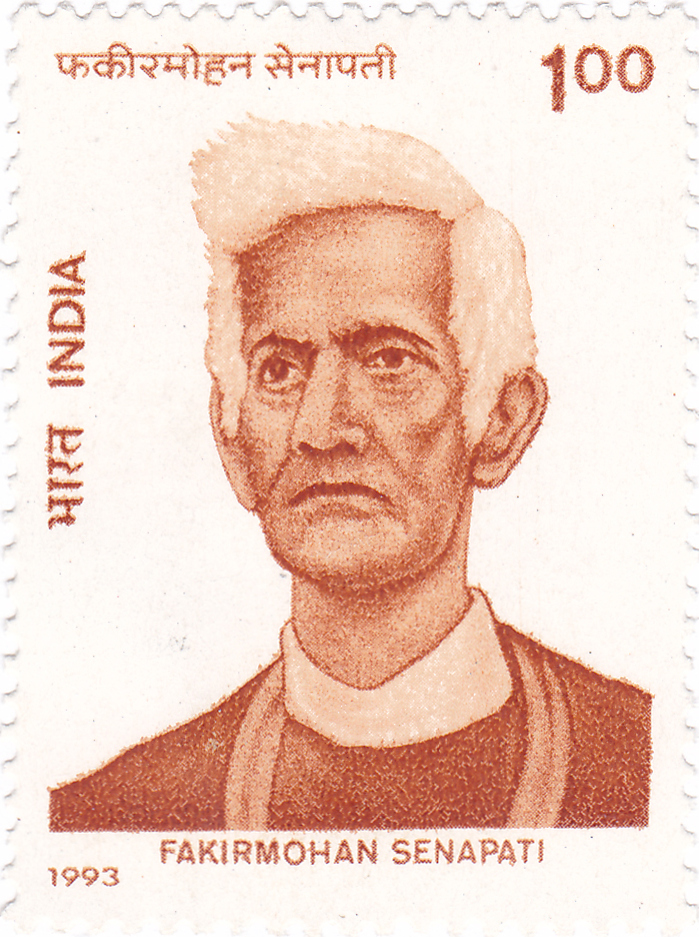
- Senapati on a 1993 stamp of India
- Born: 13 January 1843; Mallikashpur, Balasore, Bengal Presidency, British India (present-day Odisha, India)
- Died: 14 June 1918 (aged 75); Balasore, Bihar and Orissa Province, British India
- Occupations: Novelist, short story writer, poet, philosopher and social reformer
- Writing career
- Notable works: Rebati; Six Acres and a Third; Utkala Bhramanam; Aatma Jibana Charita

Signature
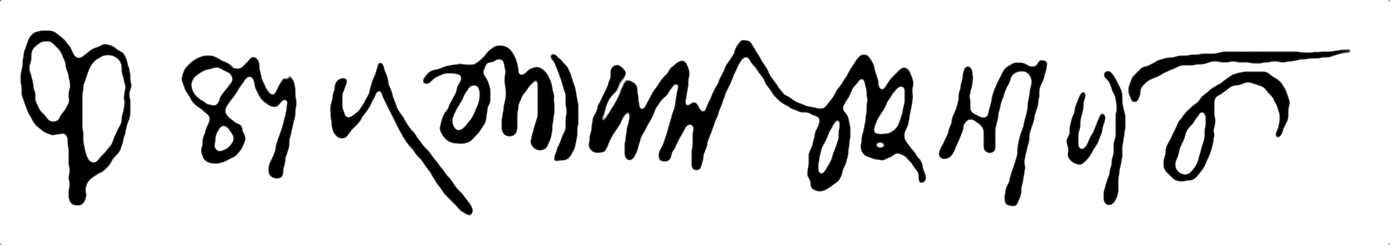

Fakir Mohan Senapati (13 January 1843 – 14 June 1918), often referred to as Utkala Byasa Kabi (Odisha's Vyasa), was an Indian writer, poet, philosopher and social reformer. He played a leading role in establishing the distinct identity of Odia, a language mainly spoken in the Indian state of Odisha. Senapati is regarded as the father of Odia nationalism and modern Odia literature.

== Early life and background ==
Born to Lakhmana Charana Senapati and Tulasi Devi Senapati in a middle class Khandayat family. When he was one and half year old his father died. After fourteen months his mother also died. Since childhood he was taken care of by his grandmother.

Senapati's uncle was jealous of young Fakir Mohan and did not allow his education. His weak health also contributed to him being a late learner. He paid towards his educational expenses by working as a child labourer.

Senapati dedicated his life to the progress of Odia language in the later 19th and early 20th century. He is called the father of Odia fiction. At his native place, school, colleges and universities are constructed in his memory like Fakir Mohan College and Fakir Mohan University.

== Work ==
=== Novels ===
Mayadhar Mansingh had described Senapati as the Thomas Hardy of Odisha. Though he translated from Sanskrit, wrote poetry, and attempted many forms of literature, he is now known primarily as the father of modern Odia prose fiction. His four novels, written between 1897 and 1915, reflect the socio-cultural conditions of Odisha during the eighteenth and the nineteenth centuries. While the three novels, Chha maana Atha Guntha, Mamu and Prayaschita explore the realities of social life in its multiple dimensions, 'Lachhama' is a historical romance dealing with the anarchical conditions of Odisha in the wake of Maratha invasions during the eighteenth century. Chha Maana Atha Guntha is the first Indian novel to deal with the exploitations of landless peasants by the feudal Lord. It was written much before the October revolution of Russia or much before the emerging of Marxist ideas in India. Fakir Mohan is also the writer of the first autobiography in Odia, "Atma Jeebana Charita" .

=== Short stories ===
His "Rebati" (1898) is widely recognized as the first Odia short story. It is the story of a young innocent girl whose desire for education is placed in the context of a conservative society in a backward Odisha village, which is hit by the killer epidemic cholera. His other stories are "Patent Medicine", "Daka Munshi", "Adharma Bitta" etc. His short stories are complied in books "galpa swalpa-1 and 2".

=== Poem ===
He wrote a long poem, Utkala Bhramanam, that first appeared in 1892. Literally meaning Tour of Odisha, this poem, in reality, is not a travelogue but a commentary on the state of affairs in the Odisha of that time, written in a satirical manner.

== Family ==
Senapati married Leelavati Devi in 1856 when he was aged thirteen. She died when he was 29 leaving behind a daughter. In summer 1871, he married Krushna Kumari Dei, who died in 1894 leaving behind a son and a daughter.

== See also ==
- List of Indian writers
- List of Indian poets
- Odia literature
- Odia language
