= Gurukrushna Goswami =

Indian lyricist

Gurukrushna Goswami (7 November 1934 – 6 May 2018) was an Indian Odia lyricist. He had made contribution in form of numerous songs' lyrics belonging to various styles. His career spanned over five decades. Additionally, he is credited with script writing and music direction.
