= Prabhat Mukherjee =

Indian film director, actor and writer

- Born: 1917; Calcutta, Bengal Presidency, British Raj
- Died: 1997 (aged 79–80); Calcutta, West Bengal, India
- Other name: P Mukherjee
- Occupations: Film director, actor
- Spouse: Arundhati Devi (m. 1940; div. 1955)
- Children: 1

Prabhat Mukherjee (1917–1997) was an Indian film director, actor and writer. He is known for his work in Bengali, Assamese, Odia and Hindi-language films.

== Career ==
Mukherjee's career began with All India Radio. He started acting in Bengali films in 1950. The first film directed by him was Maa (1956), in Bengali language. In 1959 he worked with the actor Uttam Kumar in a film called Bicharak, which won the National Film Award for Best Feature Film in Bengali. Mukherjee directed three more films by 1960. The Assamese film Puberun, directed by Mukerjee was released in 1959. The film was screened at the 1960 Berlin Film Festival. He also wrote the script for the film. From 1972 to 1984, Mukherjee made at least five Odia films. One of these is Ratnakar (1982), which was the first film of Odia actor and director Prashant Nanda. His other Odia films include Nuabou(1962), Jeevan Sathi(1963) -a film with Geeta Rao, Minati Mishra, Sarat Pujari and Manimala Devi-, and Sadhana(1964). In 1972 Mukherjee directed his first Hindi-language film Shayar-e-Kashmir Mahjoor, which was a biopic on Ghulam Ahmad (1885–1952), the famous national poet of Kashmir and produced by Government of Jammu and Kashmir. Balraj Sahni played the title role. After that Mukherjee directed two more Hindi films before coming back to Bengali films. He introduced Mallika Sarabhai into films.

== Personal life ==
Mukherjee married to Arundhati Devi (Guha Thakurta), who was an actress in Bengali film. She acted in Mukherjee's directorial debut Maa. Mukherjee had also co-starred with Arundhati in Bengali film Shorashi (1954) directed by Pashupati Chetrjee. However his married life did not last. Arundhati met director Tapan Sinha at the Berlin Film Film Festival in 1957 and later Arundhati Devi and Sinha got married.

Mukherjee divorced twice. Later, he visited Dwarka Mai and the home of Shirdi Sai Baba’s tomb. He spent the remainder of his life studying the teachings of Shirdi Sai Baba, the Indian saint.
