= 24th Kolkata International Film Festival =

2018 Indian film festival

- Opening film: Antony Firingee
- Location: Kolkata
- Founded: 1995
- Festival date: 10 Nov 2018 – 17 Nov 2018
- Language: International
- 25th

The 24th Kolkata International Film Festival took place from 10 Nov 2018 – 17 Nov 2018. Celebrating 100 Years of Bengali cinema, Around 171 films and 150 short and documentary films from 70 countries was screened at the festival.

== Inauguration ==
24th Edition of Kolkata International Film Festival was inaugurated at Netaji Indoor Stadium by West Bengal CM Mamata Banerjee.

Apart from the entire Bengali film industry, Bollywood stalwart Amitabh Bachchan, who has been a regular in the inaugural function of KIFF for the last few years, was also invited this year, along with Shahrukh Khan. Along with them, other nationally famed film personas like Jaya Bachchan, Wahida Rehman, Nandita Das, Mahesh Bhatt were also present.

== Themes & Highlights ==
The highlight of the festival this year was 100 years of Bengali cinema – fourteen restored Bengali classics and a few contemporary regional language films was screened at Nandan and Rabindra Sadan. The special focus of KIFF this year was on Australia and Tunisia films. Selected contemporary and iconic Australian and Tunisian movies was also screened, along with three retrospective series with films by Majid Majidi, Phillip Noyce and Bimal Roy. Änother category "Unheard India" was showcase eight lesser-known Indian language films from across the country – Sinjar (Jasari), Saakibaayi (Banjaara), Kittath Preeti, Boldu, Navleri, Death Certificate (Bengali), Nabon (Khasi) and Nana A Tale Of Us.

‘Antony Firingee’ starred by Uttam Kumar was chosen as the inaugural movie of the festival . A special theatre play named ‘Hirala Bioscope’ was staged on 13 November. It is based on Hiralal Sen, who is considered to be one of the country's first filmmakers.

== Official Selections ==
=== Competition Categories ===
==== Asian Select (NETPAC Award) ====
Title	Director	Notes
Manta Ray	Phuttiphong Aroonpheng	
Amra And The Second Marriage	Mahmoud Sabbagh	
Abraham	Konarak Mukherjee	
The Sweet Requiem	Ritu Sarin, Tenzing Sonam	NETPAC Award for Best Film
Saga Of A Nobody	Soumendu Bhattacherya	
House of My Fathers	Suba Sivakumaran	

==== International Competition: Innovation in Moving Images ====
Title	Original Title	Director	Country	Notes
Unicorn	Unicornio	Eduardo Nunes		
Judgement Day	Yomeddine	Abu Bakr Shawky	Egypt	Golden Royal Bengal Tiger for Best Director
She	Olu	SHAJI N KARUN	India	
Endless	-	Maryam Zahirimehr	Iran	
The He Without Him	Runanubandha	Amartya Bhattacharyya	India	
A Timeline	Tarikh	Churni Ganguly	India	Jury Special Mention
Black Mexicans	La Negrada	Jorge Perez Solano		
Sibel		Guillaume Giovanetti, Cagla Zencirci		
The Third Wife		Ash Mayfair		Golden Royal Bengal Tiger Award for Best Film
Persons of Interest		RALSTON GONZALES JOVER		
Genesis	Genezis	Arpad Bogdan		
I Do Not Care If We Go Down In History As Barbarians		Radu Jude		
Strangers Of Patience	STRANNIKI TERPENIYA	Vladimir Alenikov		
The Widowed Witch		CAI Chengjie		
FORNACIS		Aurelia Mengin		

==== Competition on Indian Language's Films ====
Title	Director	Notes
Sun Goes Around The Earth	Arijit Biswas	Best Director
Pixelia	Ratheesh Ravindran	
Half Songs	Sriram Raja	
Certain Lives In Twilight	Praveen Sukumaran	
Kedara	Indraadip Dasgupta	Special Mention Jury
Vartak Nagar	Atul Taishete	
Nirmal Enroute	Rishi Deshpande	
Obyakto	Arjun Dutta	
KANTHAN THE LOVER OF COLOUR	SHAREEF EASA	
Widow of Silence	Praveen Morchhale	Hiralal Sen Memorial Award' for Best Film
Mishing	Bobby Sarma Baruah	
In a Land far away	Joshy Mathew	
Hiralal	Arun Roy	

==== Competition on Indian Documentary Films ====
Title	Director	Notes
SAY CHEESE	Ishani K. Dutta	Best Documentary
TIDES OF LIFE	Suhel Banerjee	
MELTING ICE	Devanshi asher	
SWORD OF LIBERTY	Shiny Jacob Benjamin	
PONY TALE	Alexander Leo Pou	
LADLI	Suipta Kundu	
MEMOIRS OF SAIRA & SALIM	Eshwarya Grover	
AN ORIGINAL CLOUD IN THE MOUNTAINS	Jill Mistry	
PROTULBABU	Debasish Ghoshal	
THE MONKS WHO WON A GRAMMY	Aparna Sanyal	
THE JUNGLE MAN LOIYA	Farha Khatun	
JIBANPUR STATION	Ravi R	

=== Non-Competition Categories ===
==== 100 Years of Bengali Cinema ====
Title	Director	Notes
UDAYER PATHE	Bimal Roy	
MUKTI	Pramathesh Barua	
UTTAR FALGUNI	Asit Sen	
CHOKH	Utpalendu Chakrabarty	
STREER PATRA	Purnendu Pattrea	
SAPTAPDI	Ajoy Kar	
PADMA NADIR MAJHI	Goutam Ghose	
KONI	Saroj Dey	
KABULIWALA	Tapan Sinha	
GANGA	Rajen Tarafdar	
GANADEBATA	Tarun Majumdar	
UNISHE APRIL	Rituparno Ghosh	
ALIBABA	Madhu Bose	

==== Bengali Panorama ====
Title	Director	Notes
Asukhwala - The Pain Hawker	Palash Dey	
Watchmaker	Anindya Banerjee	
Iye - The Others	Debesh Chatterjee	
Bisorgo	Arunava Khasnobis	
Andarkahini	Arnab K Middya	

==== Cinema International ====
Title	Director	Country	Notes
At war	Stephane Brize	France	
Birds Of Passage	Cristina Gallego, Ciro Guerra	Colombia	
The River	Emir Baigazin	Kazakhstan	
Border	Ali Abbasi	Sweden	
Working Woman	Michal Aviad	Israel	
Black Hole	Diego Araujo	Ecuador	
Like Cat And Dog	Janusz Kondratiuk	Poland	
A Land Imagined	Siew Hua Yeo	Singapore	
The Man who killed Don Quixote	Terry Gilliam	United Kingdom	
Knife+Heart	Yann Gonzalez	France	
Cobain (film)	Nanouk Leopold	Netherlands	
The Reports on Sarah and Saleem	Muayad Alayan	Palestine	
Retablo	Alvaro Delgado Aparicio	Peru	
Rafiki	Wanuri Kahiu	Kenya	
Lemonade	Ioana Uricaru		
The Snatch Thief	Agustin Toscano	Argentina	
The Happy Prince	Rupert Everett	United Kingdom	
Les Salopes, or the Naturally Wanton Pleasure of Skin	Renee Beaulieu	Canada	
White Chamber	Paul Raschid	United Kingdom	
Homeland	Anindya Chatterjee	India	
Touch Me Not	Adina Pintilie	Romania	
Animal	Armando Bo	Argentina	
Sew the Winter to My Skin	Jahmil X.T. Qubeka	South Africa	
Girls Of The Sun	Eva Husson	France	
Jumpman	Ivan I. Tverdovsky		
Breath Of Life	David Roux	United States	
Ballon	Michael Herbig	Germany	
Treat Me Like Fire	Marie Monge	France	
Sunset	Laszlo Nemes	Hungary	
Trote	Xacio Bano	Spain	
A Twelve-year Night	Alvaro Brechner	Uruguay	
Savage	Vincent Mariette		
Capernaum	Nadine Labaki	Lebanon	
QUIEN TE CANTARA	Carlos Vermut		
Daughter Of Mine	Laura Bispuri	Italy	
STRIPPED	YARON SHANI		
GENIZAS	Juan Sebastian Jacome		

==== Documentary Films ====
Title	Director	Notes
LAASYAM	Vinod Mankara	
Shuhaib The Immortal Fighter Of Kannur Killing Field	pt chacko	
Kali	Subrata Sen	
CAL-KATA KOL-CUTTA	Hannah Mitchell, Alan De Oliveira	
LADAKH CHALE RICKSHAWALA	Indrani Chakraborty	
IN HIS INNER VOICE : KULDIP NAYAR	Meera Dewan	
THE SLAVE GENESIS	Aneez K M	
WB KHADI & VI BOARD A SUSTAINABLE JOURNEY	Susanta Biswas	
CHASING DREAMS	Vaishali Kendale	
FINDING PRAYERS	Nilay Samiran Nandi	
ATASI	Putul Mahmood	
THE LAST KNELL	KAKALI CHAKRABARTY	
AN ENGINEERED DREAM	HEMANT KUMAR GABA	
GULDAR	Kumar Shivam	
NURSERY OF HOCKEY-SIMDEGA	Nikhil Sharda	
SMART CITY BLUES	Debarun Dutta	
THE MAN WHO PLAYED WITH LIGHTS	SHOUNAK MAJUMDAR	
INCLUSIVE EYES	Devender Dahima	
DUSK WITH DUST	Aashish Katiyan	
IN THUNDER LIGHTNING AND RAIN	Rajesh James	
ECHO FROM THE PUKPUI SKIES	Joshy Joseph	
GODDESS IN THE MOSQUE	Priyashanker Ghosh	
CHANDUA - A UNIQUE HERITAGE	KRISHNA BASU	
MOTHERS WITH IRON HEARTS	Sanjiban Nath	
AN ICONIC GENIUS	Sougata Bhattacharyya	
The Granite Clad Neva	Igor Gankin	
ABARTAN	Santanu Halder	
05.05.2015	Arthur Yakubov	
IN THE MEMORY OF THE MASTER	Jyotirmay Deb	
BANARAS PINK	PEARL SANDHU	
A JOURNEY OF PASSION	Bijaya Kumar Nishanka	
The Island	Adam Weingrod	
The King	Aleksander Krzystyniak	
Eastern Memories	Niklas Kullstrom, Martti Kaartinen	
Myth	Leonid Kanter and Ivan Yasniy	
Tale Of A Fair	Ujjal Paul	
RANGABHOOMI BHALOBASHI	SANTANU SAHA	
The Mountain Of Law	Surya Shankar Dash	
BHAURAO DATAR - A CURTAIN CALL	Bharat Yashwant Kanhere	
Scorched	Akshay Gouri	
TOMARI MATIR KONNYA	Sekhar Das	
DREAMS ON WHEELS	VEDIKA KRUTI	
AND THEY MADE CLASSICS	Ratnottama Sengupta	
NEMAI GHOSH - A RAY OF LIGHT	Anirban Mitra, Tirtha Dasgupta	

==== Children's Screening ====
Title	Director	Notes
Adventures Kids	N.M.Joshi	
The Great Indian Road Movie	Sohan Lal	
Maassab	Aditya Om	
Supa Modo	Likarion Wainaina	

==== Contemporary Australian Cinema ====
Title	Director	Notes
Peter Rabbit	Will Gluck	
1 Percent	Stephen McCallum	
Swinging Safari	Stephan Elliott	
Mary Magdalene	Garth Davis	
Jirga	Benjamin Gilmour	
Breath	Simon Baker	
Dancing The Invisible	Axel Grigor	
Ali's Wedding	Jeffrey Walker	

==== Iconic Australian Cinema ====
Title	Director	Notes
THE STORY OF THE KELLY GANG	Charles Tait	
THE SENTIMENTAL BLOKE	Raymond Longford	
THE DRESSMAKER	Jocelyn Moorhouse	
BLESSED	Ana Kokkinos	
CLAY	Giorgio Mangiamele	
FORTY THOUSAND HORSEMEN	Charles Chauvel	
MALCOLM	Nadia Tass	
PICNIC AT HANGING ROCK	Peter Weir	
PRISCILLA QUEEN OF THE DESERT	Stephan Elliott	
ROMPER STOMPER	Geoffrey Wright	
TEN CANOES	Rolf de Heer	

==== Great Master: Bimal Roy ====
Title	Director	Notes
PEHLA AADMI	Bimal Roy	
MAA	Bimal Roy	
YAHUDI	Bimal Roy	
DO BIGHA ZAMIN	Bimal Roy	
SUJATA	Bimal Roy	

==== Homage: Supriya Devi ====
Title	Director	Notes
MEGHE DHAKA TARA	Ritwik Ghatak	

==== Centenary Tribute: Ernst Ingmar Bergman ====
Title	Yann Gonzalez	Notes
Winter Light	Ingmar Bergman	
Wild Strawberries	Ingmar Bergman	
Through A Glass Darkly	Ingmar Bergman	
The Seventh Seal	Ingmar Bergman	
Persona	Ingmar Bergman	
Fanny And Alexander	Ingmar Bergman	
Cries And Whispers	Ingmar Bergman	
Bergman Island	Marie Nyrerod	
