= List of Odia films of 2026 =

This is a list of Odia films produced in Ollywood in India that are scheduled to be released in 2026.

Background shading indicates that a film is currently showing in theatres worldwide.

== January–March ==
Opening		Title	Director	Cast	Production company	Ref.
J A N U A R Y	30	Paree: An Unsolved Mystery	Tripati Kumar Sahu	Jyoti Ranjan Nayak, Anuradha Panigrahi, Sritam Das and Pradyumna Lenka	Ommsanti Entertainment, Babu Bhai Production	
F E B R U A R Y	13	Bara Badhu	Biswaranjan Pradhan	Sailendra Samantaray, Sivani Sangita	Useful Garbage Creations, Country Boyz Studios	
F E B R U A R Y	13	Rakta Golapa	Peenaki Singh,Sisir Kumar Sahu	Elina Samantaray, Choudhury Jayprakash Das	Aesthetic film,Siddharth Music	
F E B R U A R Y	27	Chakranta	Pinu Nayak	Subhasis Sharma, Bhoomika Dash, Harihara Mohapatra, Subham Padhi	Lakheswar Production	
F E B R U A R Y	27	ChaariKaandha	Biswanath Rath	Shakti Baral, Sushil Mishra, Satabdi Suryasnata, Gourrab Mohanty	Ritupriya Productions	
M A R C H	6	Kanda Mastre	Biswajit Panda	Bibhu Prasad, Lipsa Mishra, Pruthwiraj Nayak, Dharitri Khandual, Swetashree Padhy	Biswajit Itishree Cinema, Lipsa Mishra Production	

== April–June ==
Opening		Title	Director	Cast	Production company	Ref.
A P R I L	3	Aafaa	Pritiraj Satapathy	Kuna Tripathy, Pritiraj Satapathy, Nainaa Dash	Pritiraj Satapathy and Naina Dash Tiwari	
A P R I L	14	Murabi	Sisir Kumar Sahu	Kuna Tripathy, Choudhury Jay Prakash Das, BM Baisali	Mentis Films	
A P R I L	17	Bindusagar	Abhishek Swain	Prakruti Mishra, Dipanwit Dashmohapatra, Sonalli Sharmisstha, Robin Das	Platoon One Films	
A P R I L	24	Kangula: Maa Kali Ra Danda Nacha	Aswin Tripathy	Sambeet Acharya, Suryamayee Mohapatra, Abhishek Giri	Satyanarayan Productions	
M A Y	1	Mantra Muugdha	Anupam Patnaik	Sanoj Kumar, Bhoomika Dash, Sarthak Bharadwaj	Amiya Patnaik Production	
M A Y	8	Ishq Traffic	Rohanjeet Dash	Prem Kumar, Papu Pom Pom, Manaswini Pati	Green Chillies Entertainment	
M A Y	8	Memshab	Biswabhusan Mohapatra	Priyadarshini Choudhury, Sambhav Mansingh, Chittaranjan Tripathy	Dhun Musical, Cinemascope Solutions, Om Graphics Entertainment	
J U N E	12	Chhaki Suna	Manas Padhiary	Anubhav Mohanty, Sheetal Patra, Divya Disha Mohanty, Sukumar Tudu, Sambhabana Mohanty	Amara Studios, 29 Two Nine Films, SM Entertainments	
J U N E	12	Shikar	Mrutyunjaya Sahoo	Amlan Das, Elina Samantray	Sidharth Tv	
J U N E	12	Diary	Susant Mani	Ardhendu, Jasmine Rath	Amara Muzik Odia	

== July–September ==
Opening	Title	Director	Cast	Production company	Ref.

== October–December ==
Opening	Title	Director	Cast	Production company	Ref.
