= List of Odia films of 2024 =

This is a list of Odia films produced in Ollywood in India that were released in 2024.

== Films ==
Opening		Title	Director	Studio	Cast	Ref
J A N U A R Y	1	Kemiti Bhulibi Mun	Himanshu Parija	Sidharth Music	Deepak Barik, Poonam Mishra, Divyadisha Mohanty, Pradyumna Lenka, Prithviraj Nayak	
J A N U A R Y	5	Samaya Kahiba Kie Kahara	Braja Singh	Ananya Entertainment	Amlan Das, Trupti Mirambika, Omm, Sonam, Braja Singh, Bijayene Mishra, Rabi Mishra, Jayiram Samal	
J A N U A R Y	11	Dear Purusha	Jiit Chakraborty	Jhilik Motion Pictures	Sidhant Mohapatra, Mahasweta Ray, Jhilik Bhattacharjee, Samaresh Routray, Devasis Patra, Bobby Mishra, Choudhury Jayaprakash Das	
J A N U A R Y	18	Dasama	Raja Dash	D Films Cine Production, Sradhanjali Entertainment	Sailendra Samantray, Nilakhi Patra, Suman Pattnaik, Akash Hota, Armaan Mohanty, Xonty	
J A N U A R Y	19	Ei Ama Prema Kahani	Rabindra Pradhan	Sun Music, Uday Sethi Films	Abhisekh Rath, Chulbuli Choudhary, Sritam Das, Mihir Das, Ashrumochan Mohanty, Shakti Baral	
J A N U A R Y	19	Khara - The Heat	Jugal Sahu	PB Films	Jagadananda Churia, Srikara Mishra, Gadadhar Barik, Sushila Nair, Ashok Behera, Lalit Pujahri, Sabhya Deep	
J A N U A R Y	20	Yogini	Biyot Projna Tripathy			
J A N U A R Y	26	Love Tuition	Ashok Pati	Sidharth Music	Bhoomika Dash, Raj Rajesh, Boby Mishra, Rabi Mishra, Udit Guru, Jeeban Panda	
F E B R U A R Y	9	Kemiti E Samparka	Himanshu Parija	Jay Jagannath Natajyostna Production House	Aakash Dasnayak, Elina Samatray, Lipsa Mishra, Usashi Mishra	
M A R C H	7	Boss	Tripati Sahu	RR Events Cine Production	Varsha Priyadarshini, Raj Rajesh, Harihar Mohapatra, Arabinda Sadangi, Bijayinee Mishra,	
M A R C H	8	Operation 12/17	Sudhanshu Mohan Sahoo	Sai Lumbini Productions	Shreyan Nayak, Bhoomika Dash, Choudhary Jayaprakash Das, Amar Kumar Mohapatra	
M A R C H	8	Trikanya	Anupam Patnaik	Amiya Patnaik Films	Sradhanjali Panigrahi, Partha Sarathi Ray, Nishant Majithia, Manoj Mishra, Aman Sharma, Nivvy, Sijan Mahapatra, Barsha Patnaik, Sukant Rath	
M A R C H	22	Jajabara 2.0	Abhishek Swain	Aao Nxt	Devesh Ranjan, BM Baisali, Prasanjeet Mohapatra, Sonali Sharmisstha Mohanty, Choudhury Bikash Das	
J U N E	7	Tike Tike Achihna Tu	Tapas Sargharia	Amara Studios, DK Movies	Swaraj Barik, Bhoomika Dash, Shubham Nayak, Krishna Kar	
J U N E	12	Pabar	Ashok Pati	Babushaan Films	Babushaan Mohanty, Elina Samantray, Choudhary Jayprakash Das, Rabi Mishra, Krishna Kar, Aparajita Mohanty, Papu Pom Pom, Bobby Mishra	
J U N E	14	Chandrabanshi	Yash Varman Panda, Sunil Sahoo	Anasmish Productions	Sidhant Mohapatra, Aakash Dasnayak, Sritam Das, Daitari Panda, Poonam Mishra, Lipsa Mishra	
J U N E	14	Kuhudi	Ajay Padhi	Camera Queen Production	Anubhav Mohanty, Supriya Nayak, Prakruti Mishra, Dipanwit Dashmohapatra, Sukumar Tudu, Kuna Tripathy	
S E P T E M B E R	6	I Love You 2	Sudhanshu Mohan Sahoo	Basant Naik Entertainment	Aditya Patnaik, Apsara Rani, Sunil Kumar, Bobby Mishra, Choudhury Jayaparakash Das, Santu Nije	
S E P T E M B E R	27	Atithi – The Unwanted Guest	Ajaya Padhi	Reels N Reels Studio	Manoj Mishra, Sukant Rath, Anu Choudhury, Chinmay Mishra, Abhishek Giri, Dipanwit Dashmohapatra, Divya Disha Mohanty	
O C T O B E R	9	Villain – Life of a Gangster	K. Murali Krishna	Adilaxmi Entertainment	Ardhendu Sundar Sahu, Tamanna Vyas, Bobby Mishra, Samaresh Routray, Hara Rath, Krishna Kar, Braja Singh	
O C T O B E R	9	Karma	Anupam Patnaik	Amiya Patnaik Productions	Anubhav Mohanty, Suryamayee Mohapatra, Divya Disha Mohanty, Sanoj Kumar, Manmay Dey, Choudhury Jayprakash Das, Nishant Majithia, Udit Guru	
O C T O B E R	9	Khoka Bhai Tama Pain: A Song Epic	Girish Mohanty	Kuhu Cine Flicks, Bhadra Motion Studio	Swaraj Barik, Lucky Manisha, Upasana Mohanty, Saroj Parida, Ankita Dash, Sukant Rath, Shweta Acharya, Jeeban Panda, Shakti Baral, Tapas Sargharia	
D E C E M B E R	20	Oxygen	Pinu Nayak	OdiaOne, S3 Movies, Aarpee Films	Sambeet Acharya, Tamanna Vyas, Bobby Mishra, Babu Pradhan	
D E C E M B E R	20	Parab	Chinmay Das	JP Motion Pictures	Sidhant Mohapatra, Anu Choudhury, Dipanwit Dashmohapatra, Suryamayee Mohapatra, Choudhury Jayaprakash Das, Pranab Prasanna Ratha	

== See also ==
- List of Odia films
- List of Odia films of 2023
- List of Odia films of 2025
