= Negra =

Negra may refer to:

- The feminine form of 'negro'
- Negra, term for a quarter note
- Leila Negra (1930–2025), Afro-German singer and actress
- Negra Li (born 1979), Brazilian singer, actress and dancer

== See also ==
- La Negra (disambiguation)
- Negra Muerta (disambiguation)
- Negro (disambiguation)
- Negraș
