= Forbidden Womanhood =

2022 Iranian drama film directed by Maryam Zahirimehr

Forbidden Womanhood is a 2022 Iranian drama film written and directed by Maryam Zahirimehr. The film is based on the societal pressures faced by women due to ignorance about the mental wellbeing of women while also questioning the male dominance, which has silenced the women from revealing their emotional trauma. The film was premiered at the 30th Arizona International Film Festival and opened to generally positive reviews from critics, praising the direction and screenplay. In January 2023, it was also screened in the Asian Film Competition category at the 21st Dhaka International Film Festival.

== Synopsis ==
Mahi, a 12-year-old girl, had endured emotional and physical changes after attaining puberty and she ended up getting engaged in a love triangle. She made the acquittance of two male friends at her village, falling in love with both of them. She eventually thinks that she is pregnant, but in reality it is not to be the case. She completely misunderstood the body changes which she underwent and realised she must be pregnant instead of acknowledging that puberty is the main reason for it. Mahi confides in her friend, told that she might have become pregnant after mingling with two boys in the village and the news about her pregnancy rumours spread like a wildfire at her village where she lives.

It also unfolds quite unceremoniously for Mahi as her mother too jumps in the bandwagon and reveals the truth about the former's sex. Ever since her childhood pregnancy became an open secret, she has been put under immense pressure after being accused of bringing shame and disrepute to her family members as well as the village where she lives. Mahi braces herself for emotional trauma due to the threat of violence, punishment, isolation, ignorance by family and village, and abuse which she had to cope up and deal during her innocent childhood.

== Cast ==
- Shiva Sinaee as Mahi

== Accolades ==
It was awarded the Best Foreign Feature at the 2022 Arizona International Film Festival.
