= Antony Firingee (film) =

- Directed by: Sunil Bannerjee
- Written by: Sunil Bannerjee
- Screenplay by: Sunil Bannerjee (Dialogues)
- Based on: Hensman Anthony life
- Produced by: Bhola Nath Roy
- Starring: Uttam Kumar; Tanuja
- Cinematography: Bijoy Ghosh
- Edited by: Ardhendu Chatterjee
- Music by: Anil Bagchi; Recording - Adhir Bagchi
- Production company: B.N Production
- Release date: 6 October 1967
- Running time: 157 min.
- Country: India
- Language: Bengali

Antony Firingee is a 1967 Indian Bengali-language biographical musical drama film written and directed by Sunil Bannerjee. Produced by Bholanath Roy under the banner of B. N. Roy Productions, it stars Uttam Kumar and Tanuja on the lead. It is a biopic based on the life of Anthony Firingee (Hensman Anthony), a Bengali language folk poet of Portuguese origin. Antony Firingee was a Portuguese-Indian who became a famous Bengali poet musician and fell in love with Nirupoma. She agreed to marry him after revealing her tragic history. But his fame was not enough to overcome their ostracisation and tragedy struck again.

This musical drama is purely based on the life of a Portuguese named Hensman Anthony. Anthony (Uttam Kumar) came to India and made Bengal his home. The Bengali folk songs and traditional music changed his life forever. Such was the effect that he even looked Bengal as his motherland. He even married a Hindu widow Nirupama (Tanuja). But he could not protect himself against the dirty orthodoxy beliefs that used to plague the land in that period. His wife was burnt to death because Antony was planning for a Durga Puja which was termed blasphemy by the then Brahmins. However, in real life, despite the odds of the society, Anthony and his wife lived happily and died natural deaths. That is the only difference the 1967 film had.

After the film's release, the poet name became "famous". The film was noted for its music, sung by Manna Dey and Sandhya Mukhopadhyay, composed by Anil Bagchi & lyrics by Gouri Prasanna Majumdar and others. The film become an all-time blockbuster and the highest grossing Bengali film in 1967.

== Plot ==
Hensman Anthony, commonly known as Antony Firingee became a Bengali language poet in the early part of the 19th century. The story revolves around his love for a courtesan Shakila, who he later marries and faces social ostracization.

== Cast ==
- Uttam Kumar as Anthony Firingee
- Tanuja as Nirupoma
- Lolita Chatterjee as Marina (as Lalita Chattopadhyay)
- Bhanu Bandopadhyay as Haripada
- Jahor Roy as Ananda Babu
- Asit Baran as Bhola Moira
- Haridhan Mukherjee as Thakurdas Singha (as Haridhan Mukhopadhyay)
- Haradhan Bannerjee as Kelly Antony (as Haradhan Bandyopadhyay)
- Kamal Majumdar as Ram Basu
- Mani Srimani as Gorakshanath
- Chhaya Devi as Antony's mother
- Ruma Guha Thakurta as Jogweswari
- Soma Chowdhury as Amina
- Kajal Gupta as Durga
- Jiben Bose

== Soundtrack ==
Anthony Firingi

Soundtrack album by Anil Bagchi
- Released: 1967
- Recorded: 1966
- Studio: B.N Production
- Genre: Feature film soundtrack
- Length: 0:32:31
- Label: Sa Re Ga Ma
- Producer: B.N Productions Pvt Ltd

Anil Bagchi is the music director of the film, while Aloknath Dey is the assistant music director. Many of the songs were critically and commercially successful. Lyricist Gouri Prasanna Majumdar, Pranab Roy, Bholanath Nayak, Thakurdas Singha. Playback singers are Manna Dey, Sandhya Mukherjee, Adhir Bagchi, Alok Bagchi, Tarun Bandyopadhyay, Shyamal Chakraborty, Chhaya Dey, Ruma Guha Thakurta, Malabika Kanan, Salil Mitra, Manabendra Mukherjee, Chitto Mukhopadhyay, Swapna Roy.

=== Selected track list ===
#	Title	Singer(s)
1	"Aami Jamini Tumi Soshi He"	Manna Dey
2	"Ghiri Ghiri Aai"	Sandhya Mukherjee
3	"Ami Je Jalsaghare"	Sandhya Mukherjee
4	"Aami Je Jalsaghare"	Manna Dey
5	"Champa Chameli Golaperi"	Manna Dey, Sandhya Mukherjee
6	"Tunhu Mamo Monopran Hey"	Sandhya Mukherjee
7	"Maa Tui Aamay Daya Korbi"	Manna Dey
8	"Keu Ba Karchhen Barristeri"	Manna Dey, Adhir Bagchi
9	"Satya Bate Ami Jetete"	Manna Dey, Adhir Bagchi
10	"Shuno He Antony"	Manna Dey, Alok Bagchi

== Production ==
Anthony Firingi was based on the real life of Portuguese-Bengali folk poet Hensman Anthony. Written and directed by Sunil Bandyopadhyay. The film shooting was held in Midnapore district at that time, where the film. set was made. The Durga Dalan of Raibari of Jara dynasty, the Zamindar Palace and the Natmandir (Eshtablished by Ram Gopal Ray) in front of it was showing in the film that is photographed. Uttamkumar himself acted here. The film also was shot in the location of Chanrakona, Jara Palace and also in Anthony Kalibari. The film also shot the scene of the famous folk poet's fight between Anthony and Vela Moira which occurred in the 19th century.

Tanuja acted in this film as Nirupa with Uttam Kumar. This is her second Bengali film and also the second film where Uttam and Tanuja worked together, working before in the 1963 blockbuster film Deya Neya. Here Manna Dey playback for Uttam Kumar in all the songs because that time there is ego clash and brawl between Uttam and Hemanta Kumar. Hemanta who sang for Uttam most of the time and their pair is most popular in Bengali cinema. After the film Manna Dey song most songs for Uttam.

== Reception ==
The film is considered as one of the best film ever made of a real life incident. Uttam Kumar gave the new life to this character and the poet name became famous after this film. Hindustan Standard kept this film on Top five iconic of Uttam Kumar. The film is also remembered for its outstanding music and Uttam Manna Dey combination. They worked before in the blockbuster film Sankhyabela in 1966. But this film gave their pair a breakthrough.

The film released at 1967 Durga Puja occasion in West Bengal and became an all-time blockbuster hit. It ran over 100 days in theater. It also became the highest grossing Bengali film in 1967

In 24th edition of Kolkata International Film Festivals (KIFF) Antony Firingee was shown on the opening theme.

== Spin off ==
Anthony Firingee character was again including in a film in 2014 named as Jatishwaar. Which is showing the re born of Hensman Anthony. The film was made by National Award winner director Srijit Mukherjee. Starring Prosenjit Chatterjee in double role as Hensman Anthony and Kushal Hazra. The film successful and wide praised by critics and also won four National Award of 2014.

== Awards ==
National Film Award

- 1968 : Uttam Kumar won the National Film Award for Best Actor at the 15th National Film Award (1968) for his performances in Anthony Firingee and Chiriyakhana.

Bengal Film Journalists' Association Award

- 1968 : Bengal Film Journalists' Association - Best Male Playback Singer - Manna Dey
- 1968 : Bengal Film Journalists' Association - Best Lyricist Award - Gouri Prasanna Majumder
