= Adieu Godard =

Indian 2017 independent feature film

- Directed by: Amartya Bhattacharyya
- Written by: Amartya Bhattacharyya
- Produced by: Swastik Choudhury
- Starring: Choudhury Bikas Das; Dipanwit Dashmohapatra; Sudhasri Madhusmita; Swastik Choudhury; Ch Jayaprakash Das; Shankar Basu Mallick; Abhishek Giri; Swetapadma Satpathy; Sumit Panda; Sandip Bal; Sridhar Martha; Dr. Banikanta Mishra
- Cinematography: Amartya Bhattacharyya
- Edited by: Amartya Bhattacharyya
- Music by: Kisaloy Roy
- Production company: Swastik Arthouse Les Films de la Haute-Vallée FilmStop Entertainment
- Distributed by: Platoon Distribution
- Release dates: April 2021 (Moscow Film Festival); 2 September 2022
- Running time: 83 minutes
- Country: India
- Language: Odia

Adieu Godard (stylized as adieu GODARD) is a 2021 Odia language independent drama film written and directed by Amartya Bhattacharyya. The film world premiered at the 43rd Moscow International Film Festival 2021. In India, the film got officially selected at festivals like IFFK (Kerala), KIFF (Kolkata), BIFFes (Bengaluru),PIFF (Pune) etc. Adieu Godard also won Best Film Award in the Indian Languages competition at the 27th Kolkata International Film Festival 2022 and the 'Third Best Indian Cinema Award' at the 13th Bengaluru International Film Festival 2022.

The film is produced under the banner of Odisha-based production company Swastik Arthouse, in association with Kolkata-based FilmStop Entertainment and the French company Les Films de la Haute-Vallée.

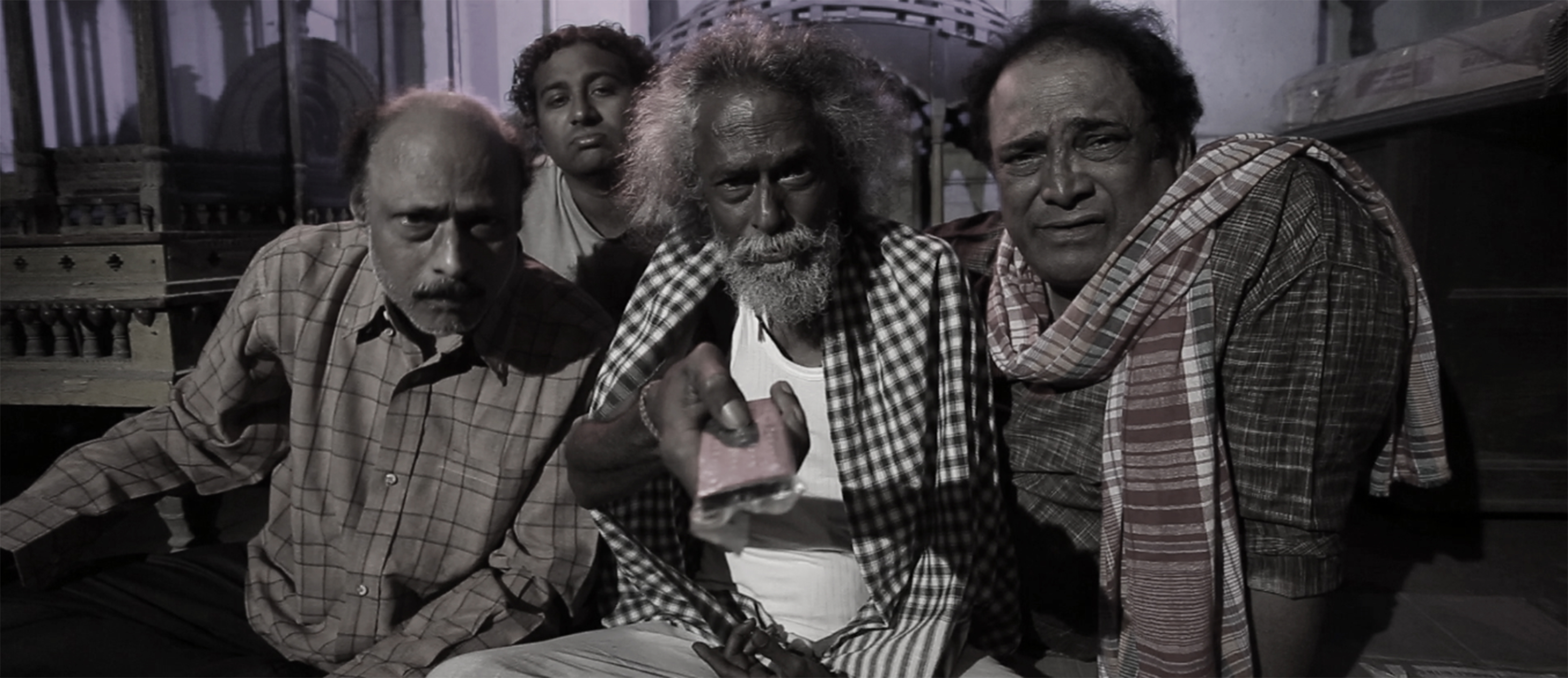
A still from 'Adieu GODARD'

== Plot ==
In a rural Indian village, an elderly man who watches pornography with friends mistakenly gets a film by the French filmmaker Jean-Luc Godard. Fascinated, he becomes obsessed and plans a village film festival showing Godard's work.

== Cast ==
- Choudhury Bikash Das as Ananda
- Sudharsri Madhusmita as Shilpa
- Dipanwit Dashmohapatra as Joe
- Swastik Choudhury as Jatin
- Choudhury Jayaprakash Das as Harideb
- Shankar Basu Mallick as Jaga
- Abhishek Giri as Pablo
- Dr. Banikanta Mishra as Dr.Tripathy
- Swetapadma Satpathy as Ananda's Wife
- Sumit Panda as Tutu

== Release ==
Adieu Godard' was released in theaters of India on September 2, 2022. The film was released in India by Platoon distribution, while renowned star of Odia cinema, Anu Choudhury, presented it. The film ran in theaters for four weeks in Odisha, and apart from Bhubaneswar, Cuttack, Rourkela, the film was also released in Kolkata, New Delhi and Bangalore with a special show at Jaipur and Mumbai. While the film was running in theaters in India, Jean-Luc Godard committed assisted suicide on September 13, 2022.

The film was greeted with a lot of enthusiasm from notable film personalities like Anurag Kashyup and Taran Adarsh. Apart from India, the film was also digitally released in the US and Canada through the US based distributor - Film Movement.

== Critical reception ==
The film was screened at various film festivals in India and abroad. Adieu Godard featured in the list of top 10 films to look out for at the Moscow Film Festival.

Devika Girish of The New York Times wrote that "This limp satire about an Indian villager’s encounter with the movies of Jean-Luc Godard rehashes regressive stereotypes and squanders a potent premise".

== Film festival screenings ==
Year	Festival	Place	Awards
2021	43rd Moscow International Film Festival	Moscow, Russia	
2021	26th Split Film Festival	Split, Croatia	
2021	Mosaic International South Asian Film Festival	Ontario, Canada	
2021	San José International Film Awards	San José, Costa Rica	
2022	26th International Film Festival of Kerala	Trivandrum, India	
2022	27th Kolkata International Film Festival	Kolkata, India	Best Film award- Indian Languages Competition
2022	24th UK Asian Film Festival	London, UK	Dare to Dream-Theme award 2022
2022	Cardiff International Film Festival	Wales, UK	Best Feature Film award
2022	Hawai‘i International Film Festival	Honolulu, USA	
2022	39. Französische Filmtage Tübingen - Stuttgart	Tübingen - Stuttgart, Germany	
2022	10th Asian Film Festival of Barcelona	Barcelona, Spain	
2022	20th Pune International Film Festival	Pune, India	
2022	13th Bengaluru International Film Festival	Bengaluru, India	Third Best Indian Cinema award
2022	19th Indian Film Festival of Stuttgart	Stuttgart, Germany	
2022	3rd i San Francisco International South Asian Film Festival	San Francisco, USA	
2022	Bayamón International Film Festival	Bayamón, Puerto Rico	
2022	Sipontum Arthouse International Film Festival	Puglia, Italy	Best Director, Best Actor, Best Screenplay awards
2022	7th Jaffna International Cinema Festival	Jaffna, Sri Lanka	
2022	17th International Film Festival of Thrissur	Thrissur, India	
2022	Regional International Film Festival of Kerala	Kochi, India	
2022	13th Panchajanyam International Film Festival	Chittur, India	
2022	Mysore Dasara Film Festival	Mysore, India	
2022	12th Yashwant International Film Festival	Mumbai, India	
2022	Telangana Bengali Film Festival	Hyderabad, India	
2023	Kanazawa Film Festival	Kanazawa, Japan	
2023	20th BYOFF	Puri, India	
2023	15th Habitat Film Festival	New Delhi, India	
2023	Nitte International Film Festiaval	Mangalore, India	
2023	Meghalaya International Film Festival	Meghalaya, India	
2023	Bengal International Film Festival	Kolkata, India	
