= Khyanikaa: The Lost Idea =

Indian 2017 independent feature film

- Directed by: Amartya Bhattacharyya
- Written by: Amartya Bhattacharyya
- Produced by: Swastik Choudhury
- Starring: Amrita Chowdhury; Susant Misra; Swastik Choudhury; Hrushikesh Bhoi; Choudhury Bikash Das; Dipanwit Dashmohapatra; Anu Choudhury; Bhaswati Basu
- Cinematography: Amartya Bhattacharyya
- Edited by: Amartya Bhattacharyya
- Music by: Kisaloy Roy
- Release date: 2017
- Running time: 89 minutes
- Country: India
- Language: Odia

Khyanikaa: The Lost Idea is a 2017 Odia language independent feature film written and directed by Amartya Bhattacharyya. The film won the state award for Best Editing at the 29th Odisha State Film Awards which was awarded to the filmmaker Amartya Bhattacharyya, who was also the editor of the film.

The treatment of the film is more like a satire with moments of humorous illustrations of serious reality and often merging into spaces of magic realism and surrealism. The film was the only Odia language film at the Indian Panorama at 48th International Film Festival of India 2017. The film also gathered a lot of critical acclamation at the international film festival circuit. The film is produced by Swastik Choudhury under the banner of Swastik Arthouse.

The film was premiered at Hidden Gems Film Festival in Canada followed by a number of other festivals including the Dhaka International Film Festival and Ethiopian International Film Festival. The film won the Honorable Jury Mention award at 5th Noida International Film Festival 2018.

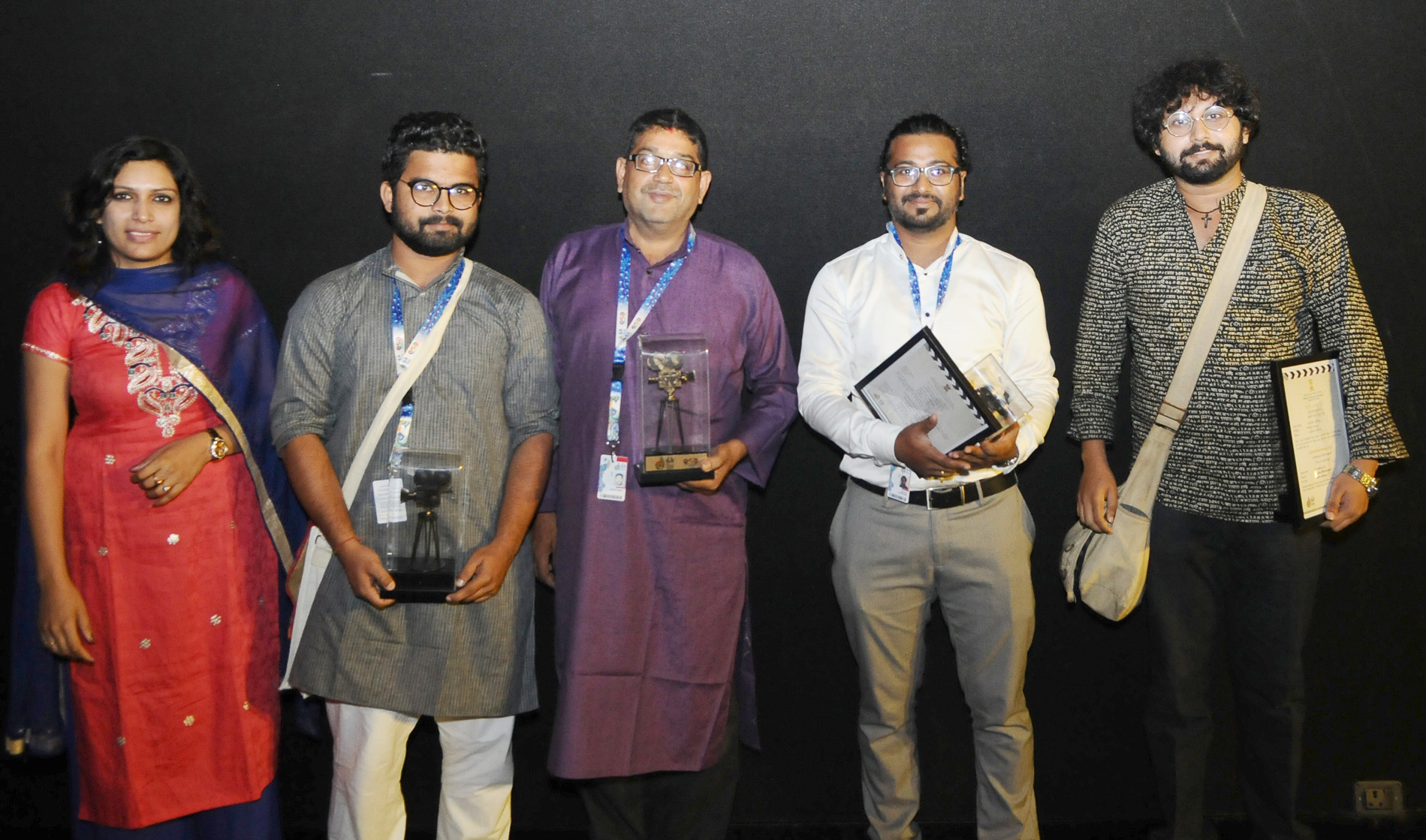
Film crew at IFFI (2017)

== Cast ==
- Amrita Chowdhury as Idea
- Swastik Choudhury as British
- Susant Misra as Lazy Man
- Choudhury Bikash Das as Mad Man
- Hrushikesh Bhoi as Fate
- Dipanwit Dashmohapatra as Postman
- Anu Choudhury as Commercial actress
- Bhaswati Basu as Lazy Man's wife

== Critical reception ==
The film earned a lot of critical acclaim from the film festival circuit. The Navhind Times listed Khyanikaa in its list of must-watch films of IFFI for 2017.

Film critic Taryll Baker, in his review published on UK Film Review, writes - "Amartya Bhattacharyya’s Khyanikaa: The Lost Idea throws us into a wonderland filled with impeccable colour and strange but convivial characters."

Soumika M Das, film critic of the New Indian Express, writes - "Defying the conventional formula of filmmaking, director Amartya Bhattacharya explores the problems of contemporary lives with satirical undertones in his Odia film, Khayanikaa The Lost Idea. His portrayal of the plot resembles the fashion in which a modern author presents his ideas in a stream of consciousness novel."

== Controversy ==
In June 2020, Khyanikaa released on Amazon Prime Videos, but was removed from the Indian territory after a couple of days. An official spokesperson was quoted saying "The Odia film Khyanikaa: The Lost Idea was inadvertently made available by the distributors of the film, through the self-publishing program Prime Video Direct. We regret this error. When Prime Video launched in India over 3 years ago, we were offering content across 5 Indian languages namely Hindi, Tamil, Telugu, Bengali and Marathi. Since then, we have carefully and consistently curated our local library, which currently features content in 9 Indian languages including Hindi, Kannada, Gujarati, Punjabi, Tamil, Telugu, Marathi, Bengali and Malayalam."

It led to a strong protest on social media. While film lovers used the hash tag #BringKhyanikaaBack as a mark of protest, Koraput MP Saptagiri Ulaka met the Union Minister of Information and Broadcasting Prakash Jadevekar to raise the concern.

== Film festival screenings ==
Year	Festival	Place
2017	48th International Film Festival of India (Indian Panorama)	Goa, India
2017	16th Dhaka International Film Festival	Dhaka, Bangladesh
2017	Cardiff International Film Festival	Cardiff, United Kingdom
2017	Hidden Gems Film Festival	Calgary, Canada
2017	15th Chennai International Film Festival	Karnataka, India
2017	Mosaic International South Asian Film Festival	Ontario, Canada
2017	20th Annual Native American Film Festival of Southeast	USA
2017	Echo Film Festival (BRICS)	Moscow, Russia
2017	12th Ethiopian International Film Festival	Ethiopia
2018	5th Noida International Film Festival	Noida, India
2018	Nitte International Film Festival	Mangaluru, India
2018	Zsigmond Vilmos International Film Festival	Szeged, Hungary
2018	FFSI National Film Festival	Kolkata, India
2018	Pondicherry International Film Festival	Pondicherry, India
2018	Bioscope Global Film Festival	Amritsar, India
2018	Dasara Film Festival	Mysuru, India
2018	Festival Internacional de Cine con Medios Alternativos	Mexico City, Mexico
2018	Nepal Cultural International Film Festival	Kathmandu, Nepal
2018	Pearl International Film Festival	Kampala, Uganda
2018	Brahmaputra Valley Film Festival	Guwahati, India
2018	La Paz International Film Festival	La Paz, Bolivia
2018	9th Asian Film Festival	Pune, India
2018	13th International Film Festival of Thrissur	Thrissur, India
2018	International Innovation Film Festival 2018	Bern, Switzerland
2019	Covellite International Film Festival	Butte, USA
2019	Phenicien International Film Festival	Lyon, France
2020	Panchajanyam International Film Festival	Kerala, India
