= Hello Arsi =

2018 Odia language film

- Directed by: Sambit Mohanty
- Screenplay by: Sambit Mohanty
- Produced by: Ajaya Routray
- Starring: Prakruti Mishra; Partha Sarathi Ray
- Narrated by: Editorb- Siba prasad mohanty
- Cinematography: Prasantanu Mohapatra
- Edited by: Siba Prasad Mohanty
- Music by: Mitrabhanu Mohanty
- Distributed by: Bedamata Productions
- Release date: 2018
- Running time: 90 minutes
- Country: India
- Language: Odia

Hello Arsi is a 2018 Indian Odia romantic drama film written and directed by Sambit Mohanty, and produced by Ajaya Routray. The film stars Prakruti Mishra and Partha Sarathi Ray. The film background score was composed by sound designer Subash Sahu, and its soundtrack was composed by Mitrabhanu Mohanty. Critics praised the screenplay, story, and the acting of lead actress Prakruti Mishra. Director Sambit Mohanty, who died shortly after filming, posthumously won a Rajat Kamal award for Best Screenplay (Dialogue).

At the 65th National Film Awards, the film won Best Feature Film in Odia, Best Screenplay, and Special Mention awards.

== Plot ==
The film tells the story of a girl named Arsi from Rourkela, Odisha, India, who becomes a sex worker to survive. It explores topics of social alienation and industrialization, focusing more on ideas and actions rather than the characters.

The film begins and ends in a car. The male protagonist remains unnamed for the duration of the film.

== Cast ==
- Prakruti Mishra as Arsi
- Partha Sarathi Ray as the taxi driver

== Production and themes ==
The film was shot in Rourkela and the shooting for the film was completed in November 2016. After Sambit Mohanty died due to brain stroke, the Film and Television Institute of India helped complete the film. The film is based on human displacement.

== Reception ==
The film was appreciated by then Chief Minister Naveen Patnaik, filmmaker Shekhar Kapur, and actor Bijay Mohanty.

== Awards ==
Year	Award	Category	Recipient(s)	Result	Ref
2018	65th National Film Awards	Best Feature Odia Film	Sambit Mohanty	Won	
2018	65th National Film Awards	Best Screenplay	Sambit Mohanty	Won	
2018	65th National Film Awards	Special Mention (Actress)	Prakruti Mishra	Won	
2019	29th Odisha State Film Awards	Best Film	Hello Arsi	Won	
2019	29th Odisha State Film Awards	Best Director	Sambit Mohanty	Won	
2019	29th Odisha State Film Awards	Best Dialogue Writer	Sambit Mohanty	Won	
2019	29th Odisha State Film Awards	Best Actor	Partha Sarathi Ray	Won	

== Impact ==
The film was considered to be a significant film in the careers of Prakruti Mishra and Partha Sarathi Ray.
