= Capital I =

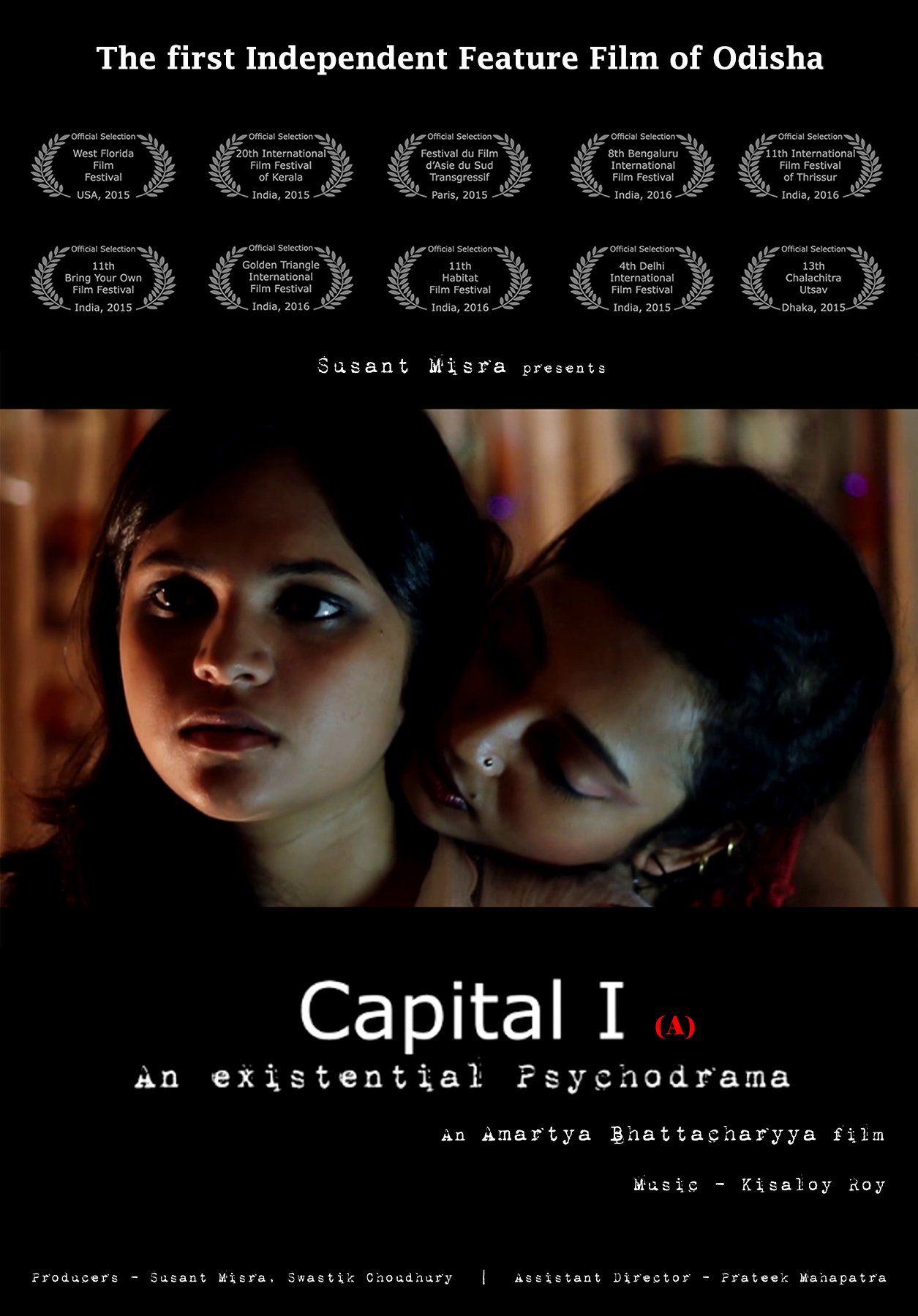
- Theatrical release poster
- Directed by: Amartya Bhattacharyya
- Written by: Amartya Bhattacharyya
- Produced by: Swastik Choudhury
- Starring: Pallavi Priyadarshini Susant Misra Ipsita Mohanty
- Cinematography: Amartya Bhattacharyya
- Edited by: Amartya Bhattacharyya
- Music by: Kisaloy Roy
- Release date: February 5, 2015 (Festival du film d'Asie du Sud transgressif)
- Running time: 85 minutes
- Country: India
- Language: Odia

Capital I is a 2015 Odia language independent feature film written and directed by Amartya Bhattacharyya. This film, tagged as an existential psychodrama, is the first independent feature film of Odisha. The film is produced by Susant Misra and Swastik Choudhury. This film is shot on a shoe-string budget without any film industry involvement. This film marks the feature film debut of Amartya Bhattacharyya as a writer, director, cinematographer and editor. All actors in this film are non-professional actors, and all of them make their feature film debut in ‘Capital I'. Kisaloy Roy makes his debut as a music director, and so does Amrita Chowdhury as a Choreographer.

Capital I was premiered at Festival du Film d'Asie du Sud Transgressif (South Asian Alternative Film Festival) at Paris in February 2015. Thereafter, the film was screened at various film festivals including 20th International Film Festival of Kerala in December 2015. Capital I is distributed worldwide through the Italian sales and distribution company The Open Reel. Capital I is the first Indian film to be acquired by The Open Reel. In India, the film has been theatrically released in multiplexes (INOX and Cinépolis). The film's initial release dates are 23 October 2016 for Bhubaneswar, 6 November 2016 for Kolkata and 4 December 2016 for Mumbai.

Capital I is also the first ever Odia film to be released on Amazon Prime. In 2017, the film released on Amazon Prime in English speaking territories like USA, UK, Australia, Canada etc.

== Plot ==
Capital I is a fictitious character having its root in reality. There was an old house which was locked from inside with all windows closed, and when the police broke open the door, they found no one, neither any living person, nor a dead body. They only found few papers lying, with some abstract phrases and pictures with the signature below reading 'Capital I'. Police found the case unworthy of further investigations, as it doesn't affect anyone. They close the case. But media spreads the rumor about the mysterious character and creates a buzz in the town. A young girl, pursuing MSC Psychology gets involved with her old Physics professor to research about Capital I. They research on the name, the phrases and the pictures and wrack their brain through a lot of intellectual thoughts. They eventually start transforming themselves psychologically. The girl, who wasn't satisfied with her submissive boyfriend living in Delhi, gets into a state of deep trance and starts hallucinating. Under extreme stress of the research, she loses her conscious control. The professor, also into a trance, couldn't break away, and the film suggestively ventures into the inevitable.

The film breaks away from realistic continuity and ventures into the surreal sphere. Scenes move randomly, just like a wandering mind having its root in reality. The film ends with an abstract culmination. Existence meanders through reality and imagination and ventures into a time-independent eternity. Moments tear apart and the debris of thoughts is periodically washed out, through the menstrual cycle of our minds. And the mind gets ready, yet again, for a new conception.

== Cast ==
- Pallavi Priyadarshini as Piyali
- Susant Misra as Professor Misra
- Ipsita Mohanty as Pooja
- Ashutosh Panda as Farmer/Mime- artist

== Independent production ==
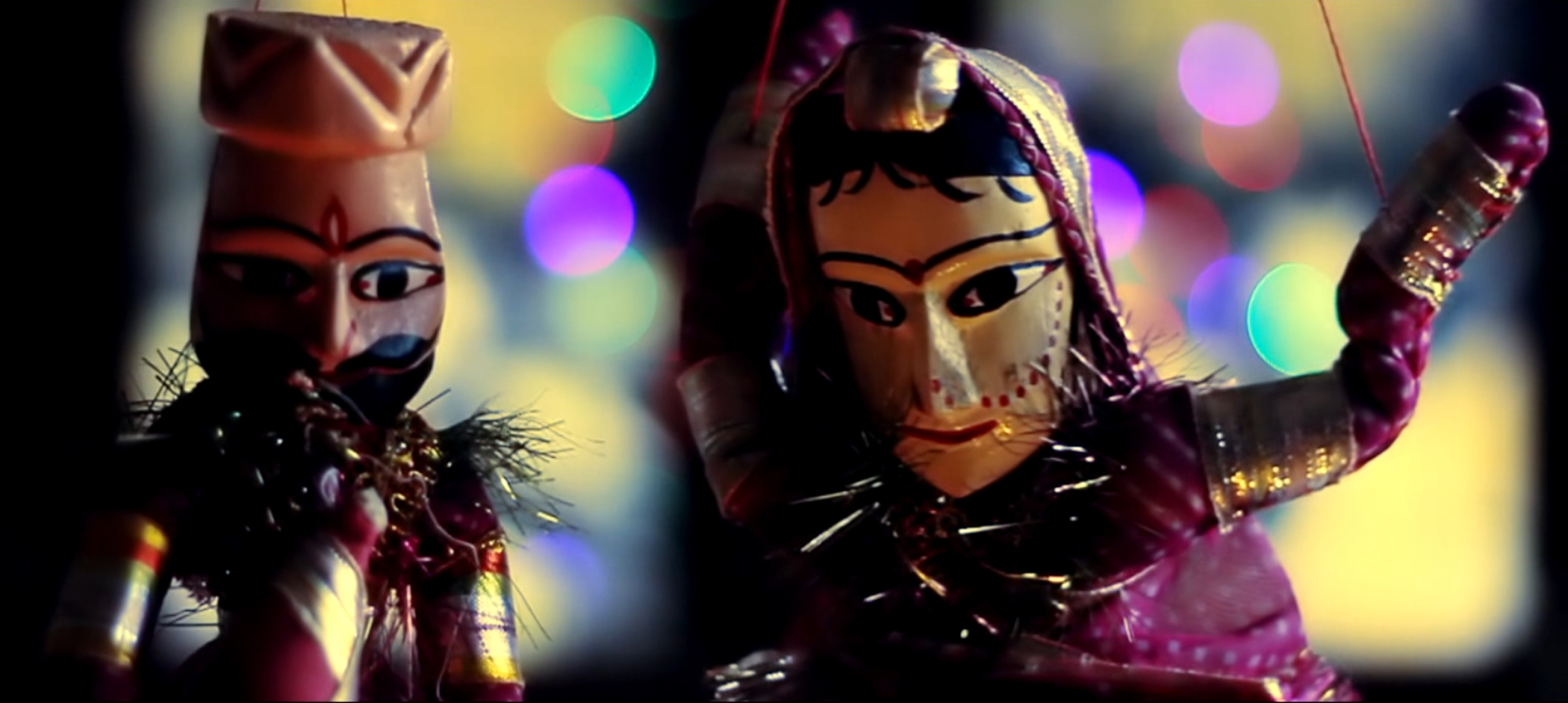
A still from 'Capital I'

‘Capital I' was made with a DSLR camera (Canon 550D) and a still-photography tripod. The film is shot with a team size of less than five people including the cast, and can be considered a guerrilla film. The film was produced independently by Susant Misra and Swastik Choudhury, who also make their debut as producers. It is the first independent film made in the state of Odisha.

The lenses used were ordinary 18-55mm (f4-5.6) and 50mm (f1.8) lens. The complete post production, from editing to colour correction, sound design to sound mixing, was done in a home desktop. There was no use of any professional studio for conventional post-production services.

== Critical acclaim ==
The film, with its limited exposure, earned a lot of critical acclaim from different corners of the world. The film was received with a lot of attention at its premiere at ‘Festival du Film d'Asie du Sud Transgressif' (South Asian Alternative Film Festival), Paris, France in February 2015 where it was one of the six films in competition. Amartya Bhattacharyya was listed by an editor of ‘FantastikIndia' as one of the two most impactful Indian film personalities of 2015 in ‘Les Fanta d'Or 2015'.

The film was reviewed by many film critics and considered to be a bold film coming out of India. Richard Propes of ‘The Independent Critic' writes "It's the kind of film where you just sit there thinking to yourself - How has this film not been discovered?" He further writes - "Capital I is stellar a case of a talented writer/filmmaker with a clarity of vision and an ability to communicate that vision to his cast and crew in such a way that the talent involved far transcends the film's meager budget. The film is visually appealing, narratively involving and thought-provoking, and nicely constructed by cast and crew." Shirley Rodriguez of ‘Independent Film Now' writes "The gift of Capital I is the space it leaves for the audience to think for themselves. Relax and go for the ride." Film critic Misty Layne of Rogue Cinema expresses "Capital I is one of those films where every sentence spoken has meaning." She goes on to say - "Seriously, this is a Must Watch, particularly if surrealism is your thing. I think this may be my first Indian film (Bollywood has never quite appealed) but if this is what's coming out of India right now, I am SO there."

Independent critic 'Vivek' of ‘Films that Matter' writes - "10 years from now, this film would be remade and probably then the original would be looked upon. There hasn't been a cinematic piece in a long time which was driven solely by such individualistic expression."

== Film Festival journey ==
Year	Festival	Place
2015	Festival du Film d'Asie du Sud Transgressif (South Asian Alternative Film Festival)	Paris, France
2015	West Florida Film Festival	Florida, USA
2015	13th International Short and Independent Film Festival	Dhaka, Bangladesh
2016	20th International Film Festival of Kerala	Kerala, India
2016	Delhi International Film Festival	New Delhi, India
2016	Basudha Art and Film Festival	Bhubaneswar, India
2016	11th International Film Festival of Thrissur	Kerala, India
2016	8th Bengaluru International Film Festival	Karnataka, India
2016	Golden Triangle International Film Festival	Odisha, India
2016	11th Habitat Film Festival 2016	New Delhi, India
2016	Bioscope Global Film Festival 2016	Jalandhar, India
2016	Khajuraho International Film Festival 2016	Khajuraho, India
2017	Chennai Rainbow Film Festival 2017	Chennai, India
2017	Bodhisattva International Film Festival 2017	Patna, India
2018	9th Indian Film Festival of Bhubaneswar 2018	Bhubaneswar, India
2018	Nitte International Film Festival 2018	Mangaluru, India
