= La Negra =

La Negra, Spanish for The Black Woman, may refer to:

== People ==
- La Negra Carlota (died 1844), enslaved Cuban woman and rebel leader
- Caridad la Negra (1879–1960), Spanish prostitute and madam
- Isabel la Negra (died 1974), Puerto-Rican brothel owner
- Arminda Aberastury (1910–1972), Argentine psychoanalyst
- Toña la Negra (1912–1982), Mexican singer and actress
- Mercedes Sosa (1935–2009), Argentine singer
- Antonia La Negra (c. 1935–2018), Spanish cantaora and bailaora
- Amanda Peralta (1939–2009), Argentine guerrilla and historian in Sweden
- Amara La Negra (born 1990), American singer and entertainer

== Places ==
- La Negra (industrial complex), an industrial complex and village near Antofagasta, Chile
- Sierra Negra, an extinct volcano in the state of Puebla, Mexico
- La Negra farm, site of the 1988 Honduras and La Negra farms massacre in Antioquia Department, Colombia

== Other uses ==
- "El Son de la Negra", a famous Mexican folk song in the son jaliscense style
- La Negra Formation, a geological formation in Chile
- La Negrada, a 2018 Mexican film
- La Négresse (1952–53), by Henri Matisse
