= Prakruti Mishra =

Indian Odia/Hindi film actress

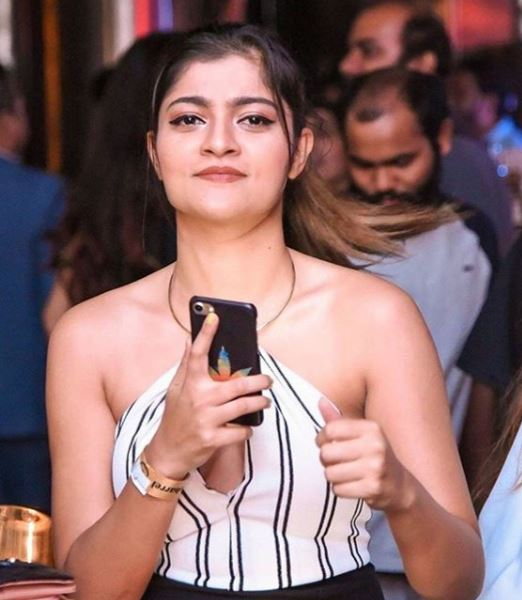
- Mishra at the Zee Cine Award, 2018
- Born: Bhubaneswar, Odisha, India
- Education: Bachelors of Arts
- Alma mater: Bhavan's College, Mumbai
- Occupations: Actress, model, singer
- Years active: 2000–present

Prakruti Mishra is an Indian actress known for her work in Odia films and Hindi television. She is best known for her performance in the film Hello Arsi for which she won the National Film Award (Special Mention) in 2018 . She is also known for her roles in Hindi television shows and is known for her role as Devanyi In Jai Kanhaiya Lal Kion Star Bharat, as Bitti in Bitti Business Wali on & TV and in the reality show of MTV Ace Of Space 2 in which she was 5th runner up.

== Early life ==
Mishra has learnt Odissi dance from Guru Gangadhar Pradhan.

== Career ==
In 2006, she won the Odisha State Film Award for Best Child Actor for Sashughara Chalijibi.

She made her debut in Ollywood as a lead actress with the film Thukool alongside Babushan. She then starred in more than 10 Odia feature films. Later she played the lead role in Omm by S3 Movies along with Sambit Acharya, Bindas Romeo, Om Sai Ram, ACP Sagarika, Mitha Mitha, etc. In 2018, she starred in Hello Arsi opposite to Partha Sarathi Ray, and the movie got the national award.

In 2014, Mishra participated in Zee TV's India's Best Cinestars Ki Khoj.

She gained nationwide recognition for her role in Bitti Business Walli, a Hindi serial aired on &TV.

In 2019, she participated in MTV India's Ace Of Space 2, emerging as a finalist.

== Filmography ==
=== Films ===
Year	Film	Role	Language	Notes
2000	Hari Bhai Harena		Odia	
2003	Sabata Maa	Rama	Odia	
2006	Sasu Ghara Chali Jibi		Odia	
2009	Sata Sure Bandha Ae Jibana	Sangita	Odia	
2009	Pagala Karichi Pauji Toro		Odia	
2009	Thukul	Aaina	Odia	
2012	Om Sai Ram	Lalita	Odia	
2013	ACP Sagarika	Chandni	Odia	
2013	Premika		Odia	
2013	Kuanri Kanya	Rangabati	Odia	
2014	Bindas Romeo		Odia	
2014	Omm	Shree	Odia	
2015	Kaun Kitne Paani Mein	Special appearance in Rangabati song	Hindi	
2017	Mitha Mitha	Prakruti	Odia	
2017	Hello Arsi	Arsi	Odia	
2020	Masala Steps	Anuradha	Hindi	
2022	Premam	Padmini	Odia	credited as Prakruti
2024	Kuhudi		Odia	
2024	Prachand		Hindi	
2026	Bindusagar		Odia	
TBA	Poglu (Paglu)		Odia	Unreleased
TBA	Droupadi	Droupadi	Odia	Pre-production
TBA	Coffee Shop	TBA	Odia	Completed; unreleased

=== Television ===
Year	Show	Channel	Role
2005–2006	Tulasi	ETV Odia	Smruti
2013	Mr and Miss Kalinga	Kalinga TV	Judge
2014	India's Best Cinestars Ki Khoj	Zee TV	Contestant
2015	Raja Queen 2015	Zee Sarthak	Judge
2016	Trideviyaan	SAB TV	Nancy
2017	Jai Kanhaiya Lal Ki	Star Bharat	Devjani
2018	Bitti Business Wali	&TV	Bitti
2018	Laal Ishq	&TV	Madhura (Episode 91 and 105)
2019	Ace Of Space 2	MTV India	Contestant (6th place)
2022	Ditch Witch	Atrangi TV	

=== Web series ===
Year	Title	Language	Channel
2020	Class of 2020	Hindi	MTV India
2023	The Haunting	Hindi	Amazon Mini TV

=== Music videos ===
Year	Title	Language
2004	Deuchi Mo Ban Aakhi	Odia
2015	Nazdikiyan 1	Odia
2017	Nazdikiyan 2	Odia
2017	Nagei De Bhogo	Odia
2017	Priya	Odia
2018	Goolam	Odia
2018	Re Parichaya	Odia
2018	Pyaasi Hai Rooh	Hindi
2019	Theher Ja	Hindi
2019	Casanova	Hindi
2019	I Am Waiting Zindagi	Hindi

== Awards and nominations ==
Year	Award	Category	Film	Result	Ref
2006	Odisha State Film Award	Best Child Actress	Sasu Ghara Chali Jibi	Won	
2018	National Film Award	Special Mention	Hello Arsi	Won	
2019	Odisha Music Awards	Odia Sensation Of The Year	—N/a	Won	
