= Negra Muerta =

Negra Muerta may refer to:

- Negra Muerta volcanic complex
- Iturbe, Jujuy
