= Maryam Zahirimehr =

Iranian filmmaker

- مریم ظهیری مهر
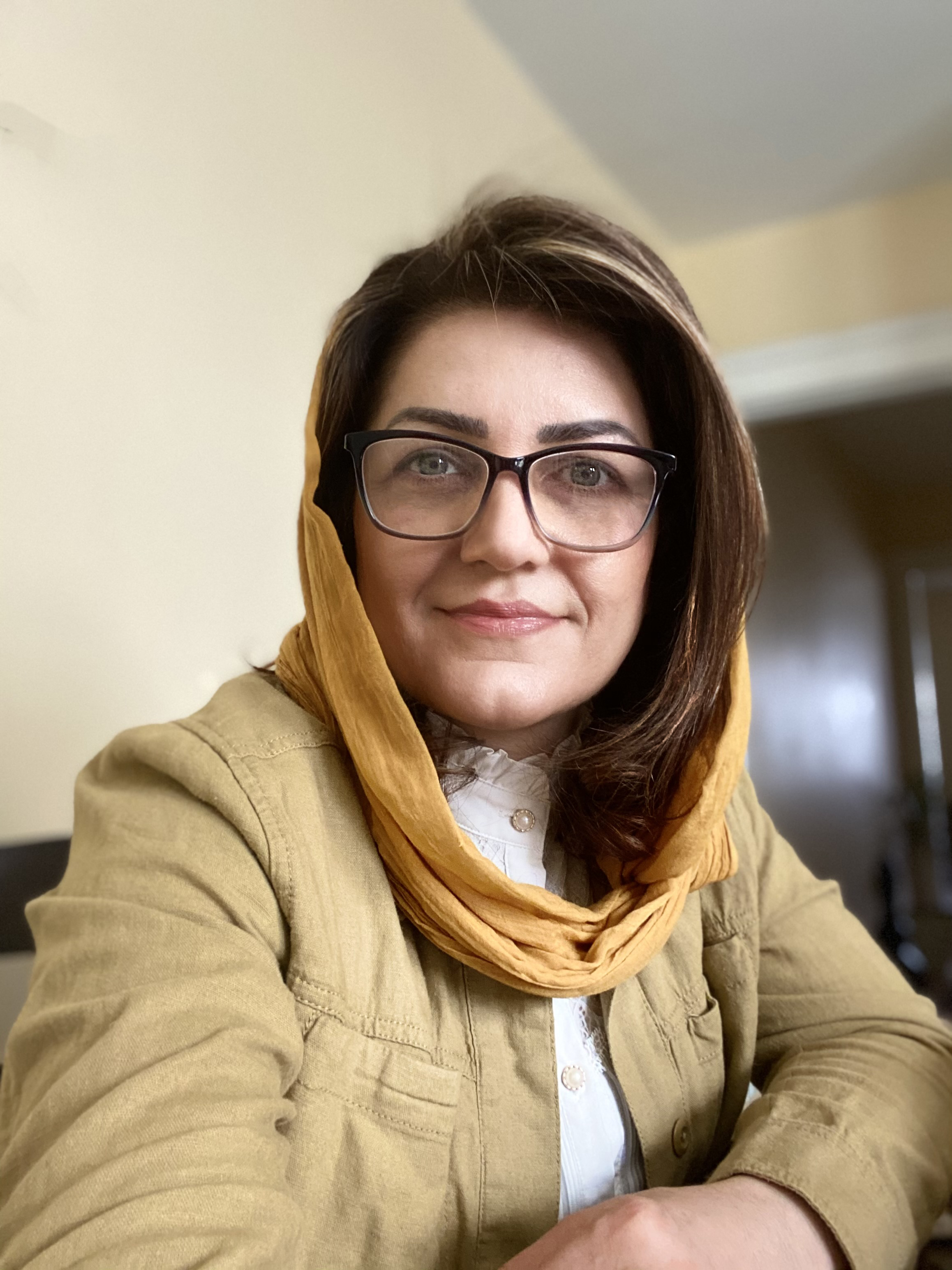
- Maryam Zahirimehr
- Born: April 5, 1970 (age 56); Rasht, Iran
- Occupations: Director, Writer, Producer, Photographer, Editor
- Known for: Endless?

Maryam Zahirimehr (Persian: مریم ظهیری مهر; born in 1970 in Rasht, Iran) is an Iranian screenwriter and film director living in the USA.

== Biography ==
Maryam Zahirimehr is a native of Iran and was educated in the USA. She received her MFA in Photography and Integrated Media from Lesley University in 2016.

=== Career ===
Her short film "Like Pain, Like Cigarette" was screened at Cannes Film Festival Short Film Corner in 2017 and was nominated for the Best New England Film at the Massachusetts Independent Film Festival in 2017. “Endless?” is her first feature as a writer-director-producer. The film tells the story of a grief-stricken mother in Iran who forced her daughter to marry and the relationship she develops with a young girl who is new to the village. The film addresses trauma related to a dowry death. “Endless?” won the best international feature award at RIFFA 2018, and also won the award for best experimental director from New York International Films Infest Festival. Her debut feature film also won the Indie Spirit Special Recognition Award from 17th Boston International film festival in 2019.

== Filmography ==
| Year | Film | Credited as | | Length | Notes |
| Year | Film | Director | Writer | Length | Notes |
|---|---|---|---|---|---|
| 2015 | Invisible Woman | Yes | Yes | 6 minutes | Short video art |
| 2016 | The breadwinner | Yes | Yes | 5 minutes | Short video art |
| 2016 | Talk to the Fish | Yes | | 14 minutes | Short fiction |
| 2017 | Like Pain, Like Cigarette | Yes | | 14 minutes | Short Fiction |
| 2018 | Endless? | Yes | Yes | 80 minutes | Feature, released |
| 2021 | Forbidden Womanhood | Yes | Yes | 96 minutes | Feature, Released |
| 2027 | Pantolla | Yes | Yes | 88 minutes | Feature, Post Production |

== Awards For Endless ( 2018, Movie) ==
- 2017: Nominated for the Best New England Film at the Massachusetts Independent Film Festival for "Like Pain, Like Cigarette"
- 2018: Winner for the Best International Feature Award at RIFFA 2018, for Endless?
- 2018: Winner for the Best Experimental Director from New York International Films Infest Festival (NYCIFIF), for Endless?
- 2019: Winner for the Best Debutant Director award from 11th Jaipur International Film Festival for Endless?
- 2018: Winner for the Best Independent Feature, Best Cinematography, Best Young Actress, Best Screenplay at Five Continents International Film Festival, Venezuela for Endless?
- 2018: Nominee for the Best International Film at 24th Kolkata International Film Festival, Innovation in Moving Images category for Endless?
- 2019: Winner for the Outstanding achievement award in Film On Women at CICFF - Calcutta International Cult Film Festival for Endless?
- 2019: Winner For The Best Foreign Director Award at the Children's Film Festival of Bangladesh for Endless?
- 2019: Winner of the Indie Spirit Special Recognition Award at Boston International Film Festival for Endless?

== Awards, Forbidden Womanhood (2022, Movie) ==
- 2022: Won the Best foreign feature film award from Arizona International Film Festival 2022
- 2022: Won the Best Screenplay award from International Filmmaker festival of New York 2022
- 2022: Nominated for the Best Foreign feature award at Female Eye Film Festival 2022
- 2022: Won the honorable mention for the Best Foreign feature award at Female Eye Film Festival 2022
- 2022: Nominated for the Best Foreign feature award at this human world film festival- International Human rights Film Festival 2022
- 2023: Won the first award for the Best long feature at DONA I CINEMA 2023
- 2023: Nominated for the Best Asian feature film award at Dhaka International Film Festival 2023

=== Personal life ===
She currently resides in Massachusetts.
