= Dipanwit Dashmohapatra =

Indian Odia film actor

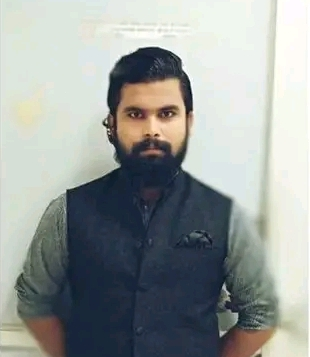
- Born: August 14, 1995 (age 31); Soro, Odisha, India
- Education: Siksha 'O' Anusandhan
- Occupation: Actor
- Years active: 2017–present
- Parent(s): Jeetendra Dashmohapatra (father); Jyotsna Dashmohapatra (mother)

Dipanwit Dashmohapatra is an Indian actor and theater artist who predominantly works in Odia movies and web series.

== Early life ==
Dipanwit was born in Soro in Balasore district of Odisha to Jyotsna & Jeetendra Dashmohapatra. He did his schooling from Ramakrishna Sikhshya Niketana and S.N. High School of Soro. Later, his higher secondary from Upendranath College. He completed his degree in Electrical Engineering in 2017 from ITER, Siksha 'O' Anusandhan, Bhubaneswar.

== Career ==
Dipanwit started acting in plays from his college days. He has worked with many prominent theatre groups like Toneelstuk and Uttar Purush Theatre Group. He is an active member of Jeevan Rekha Theatre Group of Bhubaneswar.

His cinematic journey began with his feature film debut in 2017 in the critically acclaimed Odia film "Khyanikaa - The Lost Idea" which was selected in the Indian Panorama section of 48th International Film Festival of India (IFFI), Goa. He played the character of Postman in this film produced by Swastik Arthouse and directed by acclaimed filmmaker and National Awardee Amartya Bhattacharyya who first saw his potential during the auditions for Khyanikaa held in the same college where Dipanwit was studying at that time. He was one of the delegates who represented the film at the prestigious festival in Goa.

With Samaresh Routray's production house OdiaOne he acted in several Music videos and Web series, the most popular being Rabana Podi by S3 Movies and then forayed into Art and Feature films.

In 2021, Dipanwit played the innocent character of "Joe" in the much acclaimed and internationally awarded film - Adieu Godard which won 7 international awards including the Best Feature Film (Indian section) at the 27th Kolkata International Film Festival. The film was released in theaters in September 2022 and Dipanwit was very much appreciated for the nuances he brought to his character when people watched him on the big screen. He came into major limelight with movie DAMaN in a supporting role alongside Babushaan. His first movie as lead Pratikshya has been selected for screening in Indian Panorama section of IFFI 2022 and has won the Best Story Feature Film Award at the Washington DC South Asia Film Festival (DCSAFF) 2022.

== Filmography ==
=== Films ===
Key
†	Denotes films that have not yet been released

Year	Film	Role	Notes
2017	Khyanikaa: The Lost Idea	Post Man	
2020	Charitra	Sudhir	
2021	Kokoli: Fish Out of Water	Deepak	
2021	Adieu Godard	Joe	
2022	DAMaN	Ravi	
2022	Byaase Sunucha	Artist	Short Film
2022	Pratikshya	Sanjay Dash	
2023	Indradhanu †	Not Revealed	
2024	Kuhudi		
2024	Trikanya		
2024	Parab		
2025	Gangs of Puri	Para	Webseries
2025	Dustbin	Brother	
2025	Mantra Mugdha †	Not Revealed	
2025	Lahari		
2026	Bindusagar		
2026	Mantra muugdha		
