= Runanubandha - The He Without Him =

Runanubandha-The HE without HIM
- Directed by: Amartya Bhattacharyya
- Written by: Amartya Bhattacharyya
- Produced by: Swastik choudhury
- Starring: Priyanka Ghosh Roy; Swastik Choudhury; Urbi Sengupta; Tushar Ray; Susant Misra
- Cinematography: Amartya Bhattacharyya
- Edited by: Amartya Bhattacharyya
- Music by: Kisaloy Roy
- Release date: 2018
- Running time: 110 minutes
- Country: India
- Language: Bengali

Runanubandha - The HE without HIM is a 2018 Bengali language independent feature film written and directed by Amartya Bhattacharyya. The film premiered at the International competition section (Innovation in Moving Images) at the 24h Kolkata International Film Festival.

The film had its Russian Premiere at the prestigious 41st Moscow International Film Festival 2019. Amartya Bhattacharyya won the Best Editing award for Runanubandha at the Mosaic International South Asian Film Festival 2019 in Canada.

== Cast ==
- Priyanka Ghosh Roy as Satarupa
- Swastik Choudhury as Bhola
- Urbi Sengupta as Imaginary Satarupa
- Tushar Ray as Thontkata Bidghut (Frankly Bitter)
- Susant Misra as Mishra Ji

== Film festival screenings ==
Year	Festival	Place
2018	24th Kolkata International Film Festival	Kolkata, India
2019	41st Moscow International Film Festival	Moscow, Russia
2019	14th Jogja-NETPAC Asian Film Festival	Indonesia
2019	17th Oakland International Film Festival	Oakland, USA
2019	7th Toulouse Indian Film Festival	France
2019	7th Mosaic International South Asian Film Festival	Ontario, Canada
2019	Ethiopian International Film Festival	Ethiopia
2019	4th London Bengali Film Festival	London, UK
2019	11th Bengaluru International Film Festival	Bengaluru, India
2019	Nitte International Film Festival	Mangaluru, India
2019	14th International Film Festival of Thrissur	Kerala, India
2019	3rd Bengaluru Bengali-Kannada Film Festival	Bengaluru, India
2019	Cardiff International Film Festival	Wales, UK
2019	Bayelsa International Film Festival	Bayelsa, Nigeria
2019	Pondicherry International Film Festival	Pondicherry, India
2019	Directors Cut Int'l Film Festival	British Columbia, Canada
2019	Kazcha Indie Film Festival	Kerala, India
2019	Chatham-Kent International Film Festival	Ontario, Canada
