= Bindusagar (film) =

2025 Indian Odia language film

- Directed by: Abhishek Swain
- Written by: Abhishek Das
- Produced by: Shiladitya Bora; Vinay Reddy; Shubho Shekhar Bhattacharjee
- Starring: Prakruti Mishra; Dipanwit Dashmohapatra
- Cinematography: Deepak Kumar, Bishwajeet Pattnayak
- Music by: Mahadev Rout
- Production company: Platoon One Films
- Release dates: November 2025 (IFFI); 17 April 2026 (India)
- Running time: 119 minutes
- Country: India
- Language: Odia

Bindusagar( Odia: ବିନ୍ଦୁସାଗର ) is a 2025 Odia-language musical romantic drama film directed by Abhishek Swain. It stars Prakruti Mishra and Dipanwit Dashmohapatra and was produced by Shiladitya Bora's Platoon One Films.

== Plot ==
The story followed 22-year-old Sreeja, who arrived in Bhubaneswar from London with a cryptic letter from her late mother, on a quest to discover her roots. She intersects with a grieving father's journey to faith in the ancient city, exploring themes of love, loss, healing, belonging, and tradition around the sacred Bindusagar lake. The narrative blends a family drama with eight original songs rooted in Odia culture.

== Cast ==
- Prakruti Mishra as Sreeja
- Dipanwit Dashmohapatra
- Satya Ranjan
- Sonalli Sharmisstha
- Robin Das

== Production ==
The film was directed by Abhishek Swain, written by Abhishek Das, and produced by Shiladitya Bora (Platoon One Films) and Vinay Reddy and Shubho Shekhar Bhattacharjee (Boundless Blackbuck Films). It was filmed in Odisha and London, with key crew including cinematographer Deepak Kumar.

== Music ==
The music was created by Kisaloy Roy, Mahadev Rout, and Ashish Pradhan. The soundtrack featured eight original songs, including "Bhola Shankar" sung by Kuldeep Pattanaik and Aseema Panda, with lyrics by Ranjan Nayak and music by Mahadev Rout. Music was released by Tarang Music.

== Release ==
The premiere was at the 56th International Film Festival of India Gala Presentation, November 20–28, 2025, in Goa. Theatrical release is scheduled for April 10, 2026, coinciding with Maha Bishuba Sankranti, the Odia New Year, with India-wide distribution by Prakash Films.
