= Partha Sarathi Ray =

Indian film actor

- Born: 27 March 1981 (age 45); Cuttack, Odisha, India
- Occupation: (Odia) actor
- Years active: 2010 – present
- Notable work: Hello Arsi , 2018
- Height: 5 ft 11 in (180 cm)
- Parents: Bikash Chandra Manna (father); Pratima Manna (mother)
- Awards: 29th Odisha State Film Awards

Parth Sarathi Ray is an Indian actor who mostly appears in Odia feature films and shorts. In 2010, he started his career and in 2013 he debuted in Ollywood through Nai Separi Kanaka Gori. In 2018, he received the Odisha State Film Award as best actor for Hello Arsi.

== Early life ==
He was born on 27 March 1981 to Pravash Kumar Ray, and Kalyani Ray in Cuttack. His early education started in Bhubaneswar.

== Career ==
After completing his graduation in history, he went to Delhi and joined Barry John's theatre group in 2004. Later he moved to Mumbai and worked in a few Bollywood movies. Later he working in Odia Cinema. He starred in Phalguna Chaitra directed by Sisir Kumar Sahu and Peenakee Singh Rajput, for which he critically accomplished by the audience and critics.

== Filmography ==
Year	Title	Role	Notes
2010	Toonpur Ka Superhero		Hindi film
2011	Cycle Kick		Hindi film
2011	U R My Jaan		Hindi film
2013	Nai Separi Kanaka Gori	Abinash	
2013	Gadbad		
2018	Hello Arsi	Taxi driver	
2019	Tu Mo Love Story - 2		
2020	Durgatinashini		
2021	Boffin		Short film
2021	Navigator		Short film
2021	Baji - The Immortal Boat Boy		Short film
2022	Charitra		
2022	Prasthanam		
2022	FOUR		
2022	Samaapajura Raghu		
2023	Phalguna Chaitra	Architect	
2024	Dear Purusha		
2024	Trikanya		
2024	Dalchini		
2025	Angel	Hero	
2026	Raja Shivaji		
2026	Dahaan	Prist	

=== OTT ===
Year	Series	Role	Notes
2022	Anthony	Police Officer	OTT Series

=== Television ===
Title	Channel	Role	Notes
Mun Bi Ardhangini	Zee Sarthak		
Rakta Samparka	Manjari TV		

== Awards ==
- 29th Odisha State Film Awards - Best Actor for Hello Arsi (2018)
