= Ladakh Chale Rickshawala =

- Release date: 2019
- Running time: 64 minutes
- Country: India

Ladakh Chale Rickshawala is an Indian film directed by Indrani Chakraborty about Satyen Das' exploration of Ladakh from Kolkata on his rickshaw, a three-wheeled passenger cart. The documentary drama was released in February 2019. The music was composed by Amit Bose and Yash Gupta.

== Synopsis ==
In 2014, Satyen Das, a 44-year old rickshaw puller from Kolkata, India undertook the 65-day long 3,000 km long journey from Kolkata to Ladakh on his three-wheeled passenger cart. Das traveled through Jharkhand, Uttar Pradesh, Kargil and Srinagar to reach Ladakh.

== Awards ==
- 2018: Best Exploration / Adventure Film, National Film Awards
