= Mantra Muugdha =

Odia-language musical film

- Directed by: Anupam Patnaik
- Written by: Rohit Gehlowt
- Produced by: Barsha Nayak; Anupam Patnaik
- Starring: Sanoj Kumar; Manmay Dey
- Cinematography: Deepak Kumar Gharai
- Edited by: Rashmi Ranjan Dash
- Release date: 1 May 2026
- Running time: 180 minutes
- Country: India
- Language: Odia

Mantra Muugdha is a 2026 Odia-language adventure fantasy musical thriller directed by Anupam Patnaik. Released on 1 May 2026, the film follows a magical journey driven by music, mystery and supernatural twists. It features an ensemble cast led by Sanoj Kumar and Manmay Dey.

== Plot ==
The film follows a magical and mysterious journey where music unlocks hidden forces and leads the characters into a dangerous adventure filled with secrets, supernatural elements, and unexpected revelations.

== Cast ==
- Sanoj Kumar
- Manmay Dey
- Sarthak Bharadwaj
- Dipanwit Dasmohapatra
- Suryamayee Mohapatra
- Bhoomika Dash
- Hara Rath
- Umakanta Sahoo
- Soma Hota
- Nishant Majithia
- Barsha Patnaik
- Choudhury Jayprakash Das
- Akash Rout
- Pihu Mohapatra
- Ankita Mishra
- Jagannath Jagan
- Ishani Panda
- Sujit Baral
- Riten Patnaik
- Ashis Rout

== Production ==
The film's initial title was MM. Film shooting was complete in 50 days.

== Release ==
A teaser was released in March. The official trailer was released on YouTube before the theatrical release. Promotional music tracks were released through Tarang Music. Mantra Muugdha was released in cinemas on 1 May 2026 across Odisha and selected cities outside the state including Hyderabad, Bengaluru, Chennai, Mumbai, and Pune.
