= Amartya Bhattacharyya =

Indian filmmaker

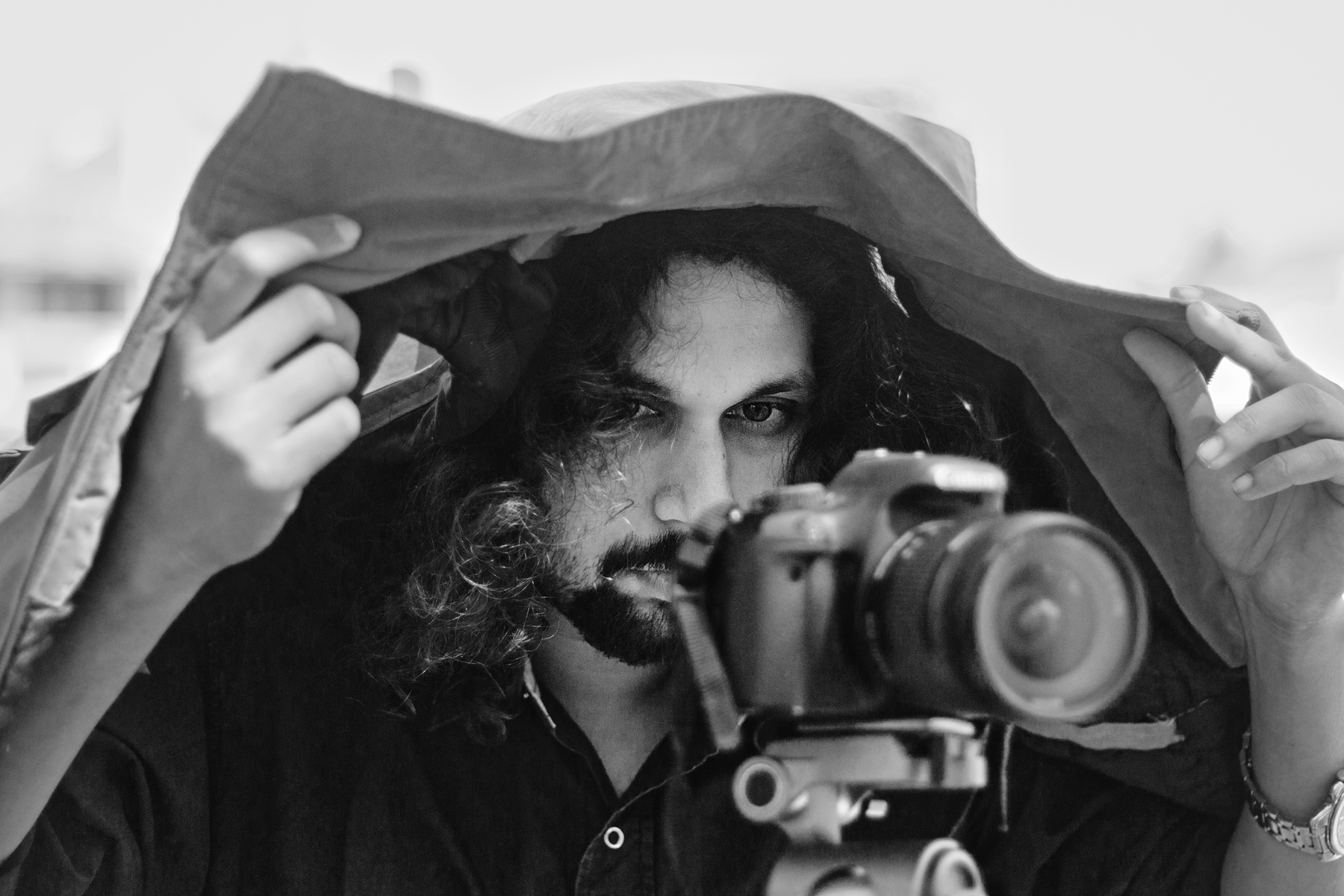
- Amartya Bhattacharyya, shooting of 'Capital I'
- Born: 21 August 1987; Kolkata, West Bengal, India
- Occupations: Filmmaker, Writer
- Years active: 2012–present

Amartya Bhattacharyya is a filmmaker, writer and artist from the eastern part of India. He has won two national awards, a state award and several international awards. He was awarded the Silver Lotus (Rajat Kamal) for the Best Cinematography in non-feature film at the 63rd National Film Awards by the president of India for his fantasy documentary 'Benaras-the unexplored attachments'. His latest National award was for 'Lahari' which won the Best Odia Film at the 72nd National Film Awards. His second feature film 'Khyanikaa - The Lost Idea' featured as the only Odia film in the Indian Panorama section of 48th International Film Festival of India 2017. He was awarded the State film awards in Best Editing category for Khyanikaa - The Lost Idea at the 29th Odisha State Film Awards, conferred by the Government of Odisha.

Amartya's feature film is Adieu Godard, which premiered at the 43rd Moscow International Film Festival 2021 released in Indian theaters in September 2022, and coincidentally coincided with the sudden demise of the French auteur Jean-Luc Godard. The film is in Odia language and is an Indo-French co-production.

He is an independent film director, a surreal poet, writer, actor, editor, lyricist and a cinematographer. Amartya's artworks are mostly surreal, dark in concept, and psychoanalytic in nature. He himself tags his films as 'Psychodrama'.

== Personal life ==
Amartya Bhattacharyya was born in a Bengali Hindu family on 21 August 1987 in Kolkata. He is a Bachelor's in Technology graduate in Information Technology from Techno India College of Technology in 2009. He also works in a multinational IT company as a Project Manager and is currently in the United States.Though born in a Hindu family, he is a non-religious person, who draws inspiration from various religions and ideologies. He is an apolitical person, and a strong critic of his socio-political environment.

Amartya's entry to the world of art was through an artist in Kolkata, Shri Siddhartha Mukherjee, who was the art teacher in his school 'The Modern Academy' where he studied for ten years till the completion of his secondary education. It was under his guidance that Amartya started experimenting with art forms at a very tender age, and developed a habit of challenging the conventions. Amartya also performed on stage for the first time at the age of six. Thereafter, he keenly pursued his interest in acting on stage throughout his school life. He was also a passionate cricketer at 'The Sunil Gavaskar Foundation for Cricket in Bengal'.

== Film career ==
Capital I, Amartya's debut feature film happens to be the first independent feature film of Odisha. It featured in festivals like the South Asian Alternative Film Festival Paris, International Film Festival of Kerala, Bengaluru International Film Festival, etc. It is the first Indian film to be acquired by the Italy-based sales and distribution company ‘The Open Reel’. The film is being broadcast through the Poland-based TV channel ‘Filmbox Arthouse’.

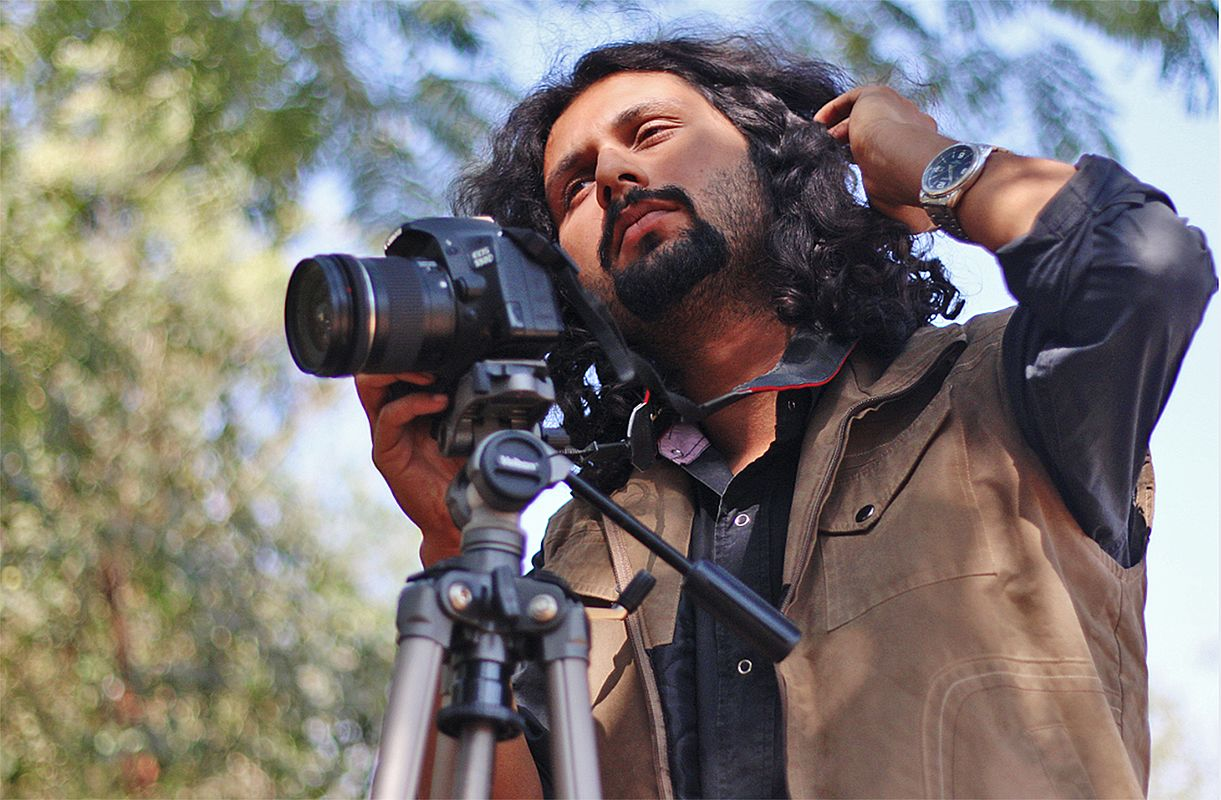
Amartya Bhattacharyya at the shooting of Khyanikaa-The Lost Idea

Amartya's second feature film 'Khyanikaa - The Lost Idea' screened at around 30 international film festivals and across 14 countries. He won the state award for the Best Editing for Khyanikaa at the 29th Odisha State Film awards 2019. After making two feature films 'Capital I' and 'Khyanikaa' in Odia, he made his third feature film 'Runanubandha - The HE without HIM' in his mother tongue Bengali and shot in the city he was born and brought up in - Kolkata. Runanubandha - The HE without HIM, which derived its name from an Indian spiritual context, was a part of festivals like Moscow International Film Festival, Jogja-NETPAC Asian Film Festival, Oakland International Film Festival, Kolkata International Film Festival amongst others.

Amartya continued making films alternating between Odia and Bengali with internationally acclaimed ones like Adieu Godard, Whispers of a Storm, Ketu, Son of Adam and Lahari.

Before making his debut feature film 'Capital I', Amartya had made few short films. His shots were a part of several international film festivals across the world, and bagged a number of awards in all categories.

== Other activities ==
Apart from films, Amartya is also the author of two books – 'Ekush (21)' and 'Shatarupa' which are compilations of his poems on love, death and the dark sides of human nature. The books were launched at the Kolkata International Book Fair in 2011 and 2012 respectively. His poems have also been published in several compilations and he was a regular writer/poet for a former weekly Bengali magazine named 'Anahoto'.

== Filmography ==
=== Feature films ===
Year	Title	Language	Role					Notes
Year	Title	Language	Director	Writer	Cinematographer	Editor	Actor	Notes
2024	Lahari	Odia	Yes	Yes	Yes	Yes	Yes	Winner - Best Odia Film at 72nd National Film Awards.; Tasveer Film Festival, Seattle, USA.; Indian Film Festival of Melbourne.; Mosaic International South Asian Film Festival, Canada.; 30th Kolkata International Film Festival.
2023	Son of Adam	Bengali	Yes	Yes	Yes	Yes	No	77th International Film Festival of Salerno, Italy.; Best Musical Film -Festival Internacional de Cine Independiente de Madrid
2023	Whispers of a Storm	Odia	Yes	Yes	Yes	Yes	No	25th UK Asian Film Festival, UK.
2021	Adieu Godard	Odia	Yes	Yes	Yes	Yes	No	43rd Moscow International Film Festival, Russia.; Best Film (Indian competition) - 27th Kolkata International Film Festival, India.; 26th Split Film Festival, Croatia.; San José International Film Awards, Costa Rica.; Mosaic International South Asian Film Festival, Canada.
2020	Ketu	Bengali	Yes	Yes	Yes	Yes	Yes	Santa Cruz International Film Festival, Argentina.; Mosaic International South Asian Film Festival, Canada.; Ciudad De Mexico International Film Festival, Mexico.; Ciudad del Este Independent Film Festival, Paraguay.
2019	Runanubandha - The HE without HIM	Bengali	Yes	Yes	Yes	Yes	No	Best Editing award at Mosaic International South Asian Film Festival 2019, Canada.
2017	Khyanikaa - The Lost Idea	Odia	Yes	Yes	Yes	Yes	No	'Indian Panorama' at 48th International Film Festival of India 2017.; Best Editing award at the 29th Odisha State Film Awards 2019.
2014	Capital I	Odia	Yes	Yes	Yes	Yes	No	The first independent feature film of Odisha.

=== Non-feature Films ===
Year	Title	Language	Role					Notes
Year	Title	Language	Director	Writer	Cinematographer	Editor	Actor	Notes
2019	Mercy Of God	Silent	Yes	Yes	Yes	Yes	No	Best Film, Best Director, Best Original Score, Best Cinematography, Best Editing, Best Producer awards at NoHu International Short Film Festival in New Jersey, USA.
2017	Darjeeling - a celebration of solitude	Bengali	Yes	Yes	Yes	Yes	No	Best Director award (Category - Documentary/National) - Kargil International Film Festival 2017, India.; Best Short Film - Indian Film Festival of Cincinnati 2017, USA.; Best Cinematography - Sylhet Film Festival 2018, Bangladesh.
2016	Rajasthan- The Fantasy of A Deserted Soul	Bengali	Yes	Yes	Yes	Yes	No	
2015	Hoyto Kobitar Jonyo (In Poetic Hues)	Bengali	Yes	Yes	Yes	Yes	No	Best Film award - Moab International Film Festival, Utah, USA.; Best Script award - Sylhet Film Festival 2017, Bangladesh.; Short Film Corner - 68th Festival de Cannes.
2015	Benaras-the unexplored attachments	Bengali	Yes	Yes	Yes	Yes	No	Silver Lotus for Best Cinematography in non-feature section at 63rd National Film Awards.; Best Film (Travel Documentary) at 50th International Tourism Film Festival 2017, Karlovy Vary, Czech Republic.; Best Film at 7th International Short Tourism Film Festival of Amorgos in Greece.; Best Screenplay, Best Cinematography, Best Editing, Best Music and Best Producer/Production team at 9th NoHu International Short Film Festival 2016 New Jersey.; Best Film on Tourism at IFFC IV - International Film Festival of Short Films on Culture and Tourism, Jaipur.
2013	Swargadwar-in search of heaven	Silent	Yes	Yes	Yes	Yes	No	
2012	Shiuli-in search of my Goddess!	English	Yes	Yes	Yes	Yes	No	
2012	Niloye Jokhon (At Home)	Bengali	Yes	Yes	No	Yes	Yes	
2012	Boba Mukhosh (Translucence)	Bengali	Yes	Yes	No	Yes	Yes	Best Director - White Screen Film Festival.; Best Editor - Rolling Frames 2013.
