= La Negrada =

2018 Mexican drama film by Jorge Pérez Solano

- Directed by: Jorge Pérez Solano
- Written by: Jorge Pérez Solano
- Produced by: César Gutiérrez Miranda
- Cinematography: César Gutiérrez Miranda
- Music by: Esteban Zuñiga
- Production company: Tirisia Cine
- Release date: 18 August 2018
- Running time: 104 minutes
- Country: Mexico
- Language: Spanish

La Negrada internationally as Black Mexicans, is a 2018 Mexican drama film directed by Jorge Pérez Solano and produced by César Gutiérrez Miranda for Tirisia Cine. It is the first Mexican fiction movie with all Afro-Mexican cast in Mexico. The film has been shot in and around small towns throughout Costa Chica, Oaxaca.

The film has its premier on 18 August 2018 in The United States. The film received critical acclaim and later won the Best Cinematography Award at the 2018 Guadalajara International Film Festival.

== International screenings ==
- African Diaspora Film Festival, USA – 18 August 2018
- Centro Cultural de España, Uruguay – 1 July 2019
- Hola Mexico Film Festival, USA – 4 June 2020
