= Sala Budha =

- Sala Budha
- Directed by: Sabyasachi Mohapatra
- Screenplay by: Sabyasachi Mohapatra
- Story by: Kapileswar Prasad Mohapatra
- Produced by: Chintu B. Mohapatra
- Starring: Atal Bihari Panda; Prithviraj Nayak
- Cinematography: Aum Prakash Mohapatra
- Edited by: Rajendra Mohapatra
- Music by: Pankaj Jaal
- Release date: 2012
- Running time: 90 minutes
- Country: India
- Language: Kosli odia

Sala Budha (transl. The Stupid old man) is a 2012 Indian Kosli language feature film directed by Sabyasachi Mohapatra. The film had won awards in seven categories at Odisha State Film Awards including best film and best director.

== Plot ==
The story is based on a small village during British rule. In the mid-1930s, under British rule, the small villages of India were still ruled by the kings and the kings paid tax to the British government.

The story revolved around a poor and small village of Odisha, India. Bhagatram Gauntia, the sarapancha (village leader) of the village, fondly called Sala Budha (The Stupid Old Man) by the villagers, is an honest and kind person and takes good care of his subjects. Due to drought, people of the village were unable to pay the tax for five years and being the village head Bhagatram Gauntia couldn't force anyone to pay it due to his kindness. And so is the village head too couldn't pay the tax to the king and was living in a threat to lose his land and leadership. He believes in God and he tries his best to help them to survive from the drought and stay together. He says god is never wrong and everything's going to be fine. Meanwhile, some villagers who didn't want him to remain as village head meet the king and provoke against him. As a result, the king decides to visit the village and snatch Bhagatram Gauntia's land and leadership (as the village head). The king visits the place, learns the truth and praises him.

== Cast ==
- Atal Bihari Panda
- Prithviraj Nayak
- Ratan Meher and crew

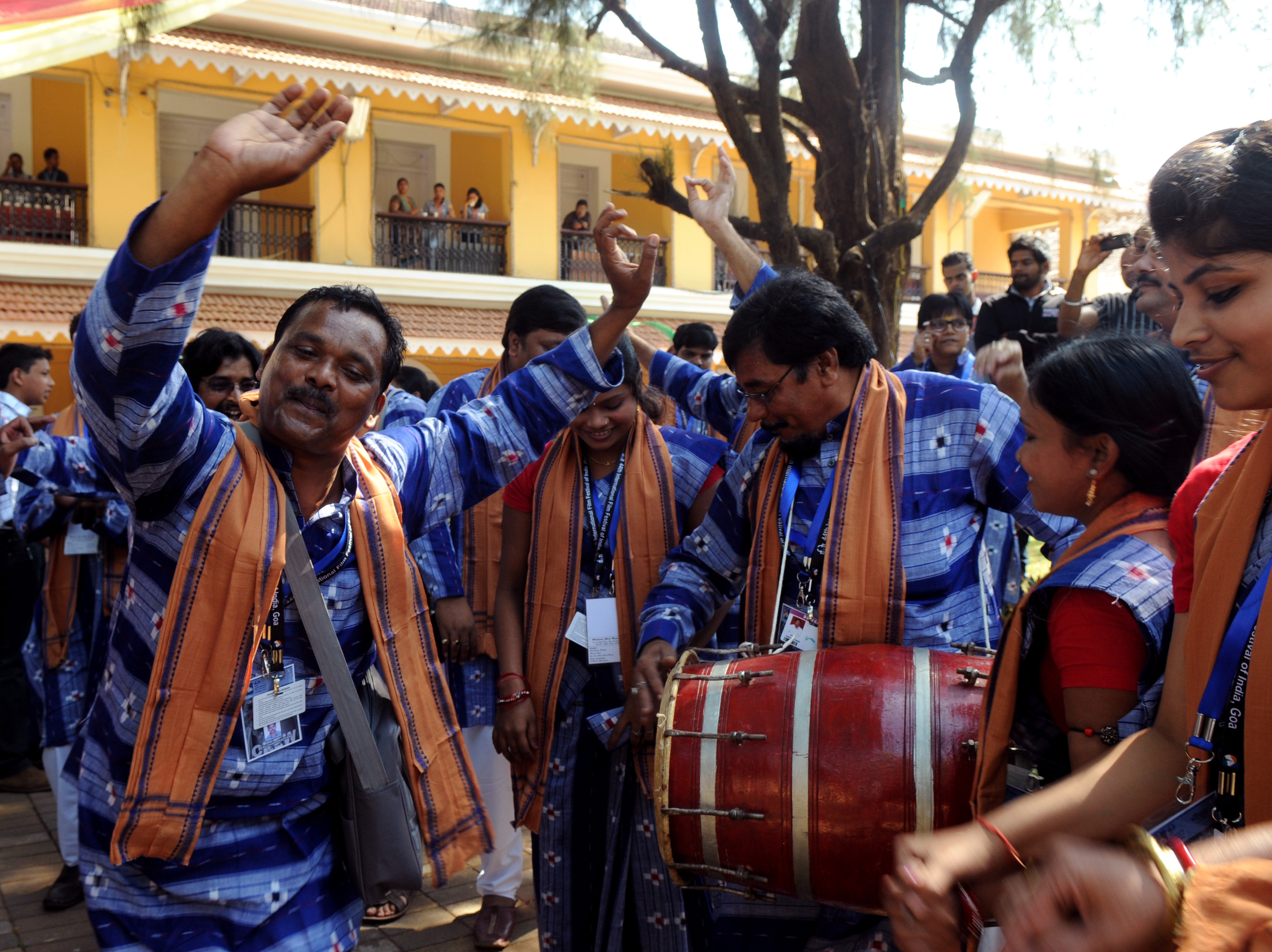
Artistes performing folk dance at the screening of the film, in IFFI 2013

== Release ==
=== Festival screening ===
The movie was selected for the International Film Festival of India's Indian Panorama Section in 2013.

This film was selected for the 44th International Film Festival of India in 2013. This was also officially selected for the Indian Panorama section. It has also won the best feature film award at the Jakarta International Film Festival.

== Reception ==
=== Critical reception ===
The movie has rewarded with several award by government and acclaimed internationally.

== Awards and nominations ==
Award	Date of ceremony (Note: Date is linked to the article about the awards held that year, wherever possible.)	Category	Recipient(s) and nominee(s)	Result	Ref.
25th Odisha State Film Awards	21 November 2013	Best Film	Sabyasachi Mohapatra	Won	
25th Odisha State Film Awards	21 November 2013	Best Director	Sabyasachi Mohapatra	Won	
25th Odisha State Film Awards	21 November 2013	Best Actor	Atal Bihari Panda	Won	
25th Odisha State Film Awards	21 November 2013	Best Music Director	Pankaj Jal, Ghasiram Mishra	Won	
25th Odisha State Film Awards	21 November 2013	Best Photography	Aum Prakash Mohapatra	Won	
25th Odisha State Film Awards	21 November 2013	Best Art Director	Kunu Bej	Won	
25th Odisha State Film Awards	21 November 2013	Best Costumes	Bhagawan & Suresh	Won	
