= Culture of Odisha =

Odisha (formerly Orissa) is one of the 28 states of India, located on the eastern coast. It is surrounded by the states of West Bengal to the northeast, Jharkhand to the north, Chhattisgarh to the west and northwest, and Andhra Pradesh to the south and southwest. Odia (formerly known as Oriya) is the official and most widely spoken language, spoken by 33.2 million according to the 2001 Census. The modern state of Odisha, on the basis of Odia language, was established on 1 April 1936, as a province in British India, made up of Odia-speaking regions. April 1 is celebrated as Odisha Day.

== Visual arts ==
Pattachitra is a traditional painting of Odisha, India. These paintings are based on Hindu mythology and specially inspired by Jagannatha and Baishnaba sects. All colours used in the paintings are natural and paintings are made fully old traditional way by Chitrakaras that is Odiya Painter. Pattachitra style of painting is one of the oldest and most popular art forms of Odisha.Raghurajpur, a heritage crafts village near Puri, is particularly known for its Pattachitra artists. The name Pattachitra has evolved from the Sanskrit words patta, meaning canvas, and chitra, meaning picture. Pattachitra is thus a painting done on canvas, and is manifested by rich colourful application, creative motifs, and designs, and portrayal of simple themes, mostly mythological in depiction. The traditions of pattachitra paintings are more than thousand years old.

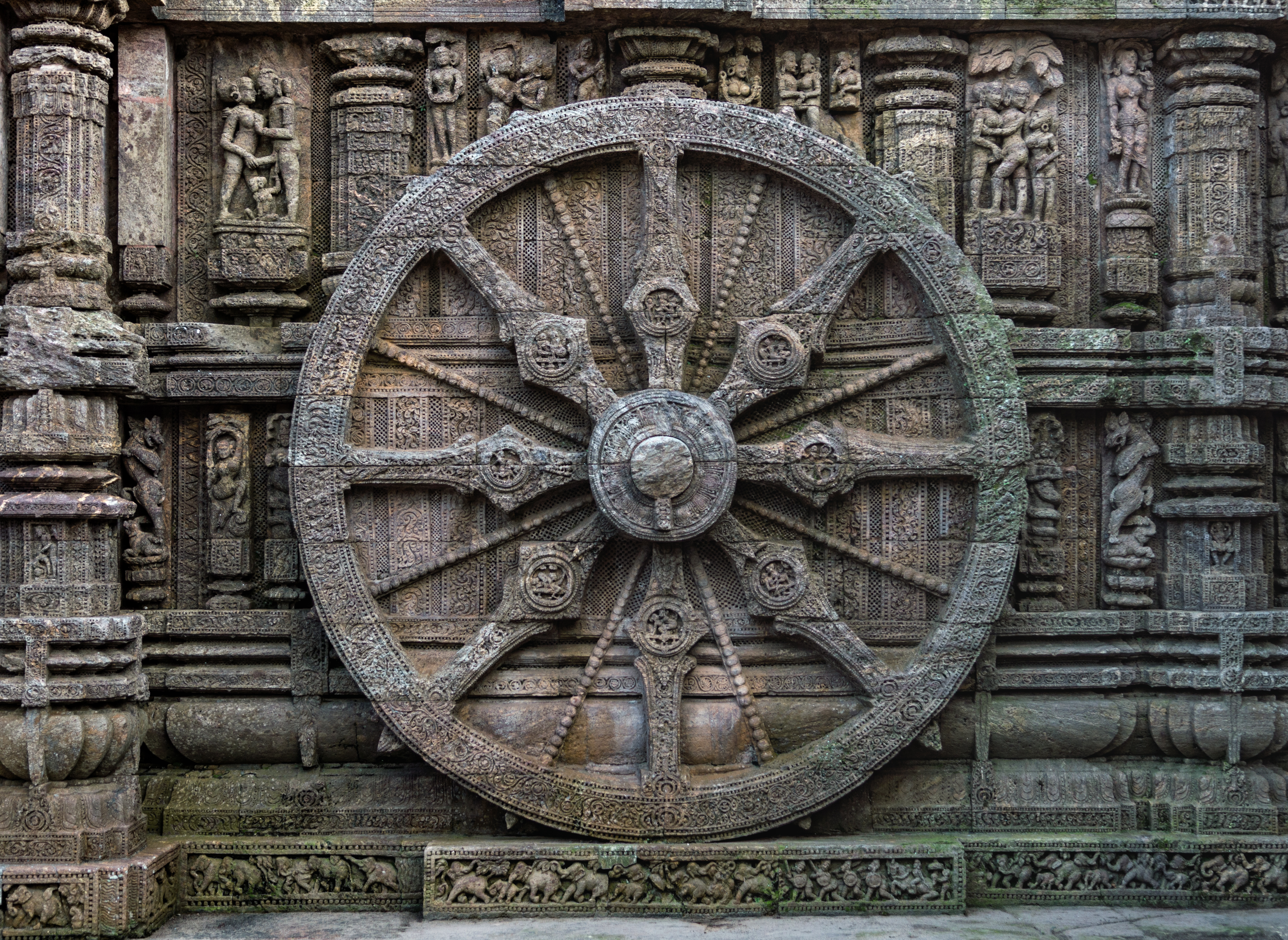
Stone wheel engraved in the 13th century built Konarka Sun Temple in Orissa, India.jpg

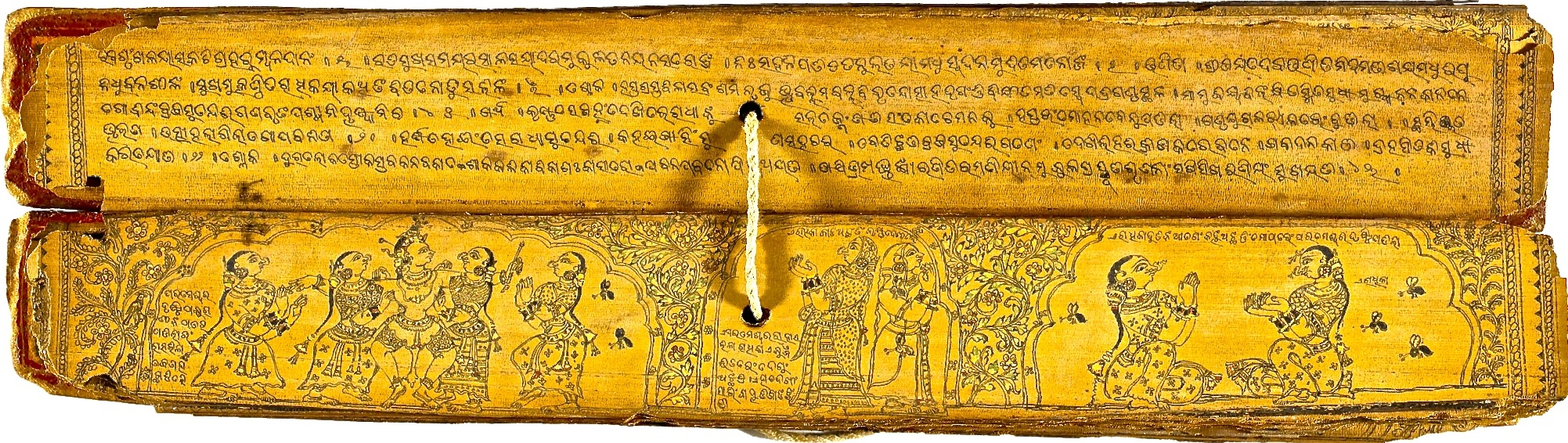
Geeta Gobinda (Song of the Cowherd) Manuscript

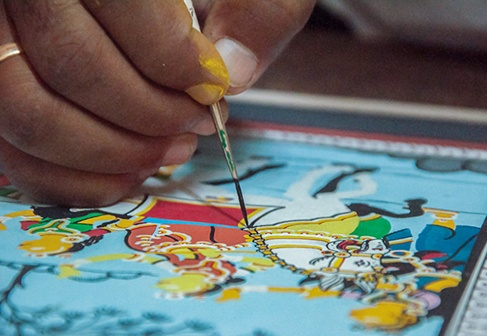
During detailing process of Pattachitra, first thick outlines are drawn, namely 'Mota Kala' (ମୋଟା କଳା) and then finer detailings are done, called 'Saru Kala'(ସରୁ କଳା).

Other cultural attractions include the Jagannatha Temple in Puri, known for its annual Ratha Jatra or Chariot, tala Chitra (palm leaf engravings), the famous stone utensils of Nilagiri (Balasore) and various tribal-influenced cultures. The Sun Temple at Konark is famous for its architectural splendour while the Sambalpuri textiles equal it in artistic grandeur.

Sand sculpture is practiced on the beaches of Puri.

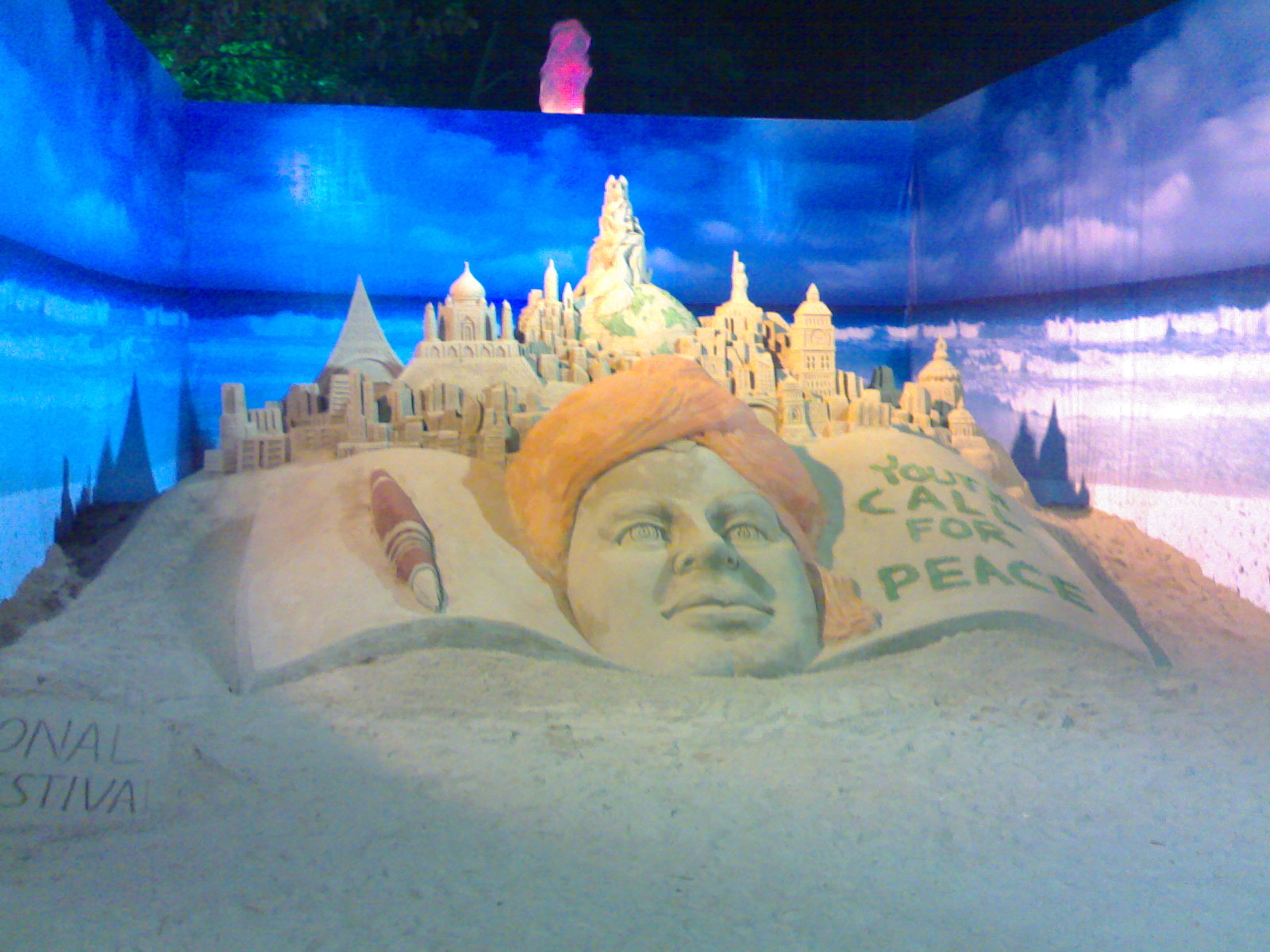
Sand art by Sudarsana Pattnaik on Yuvakriti

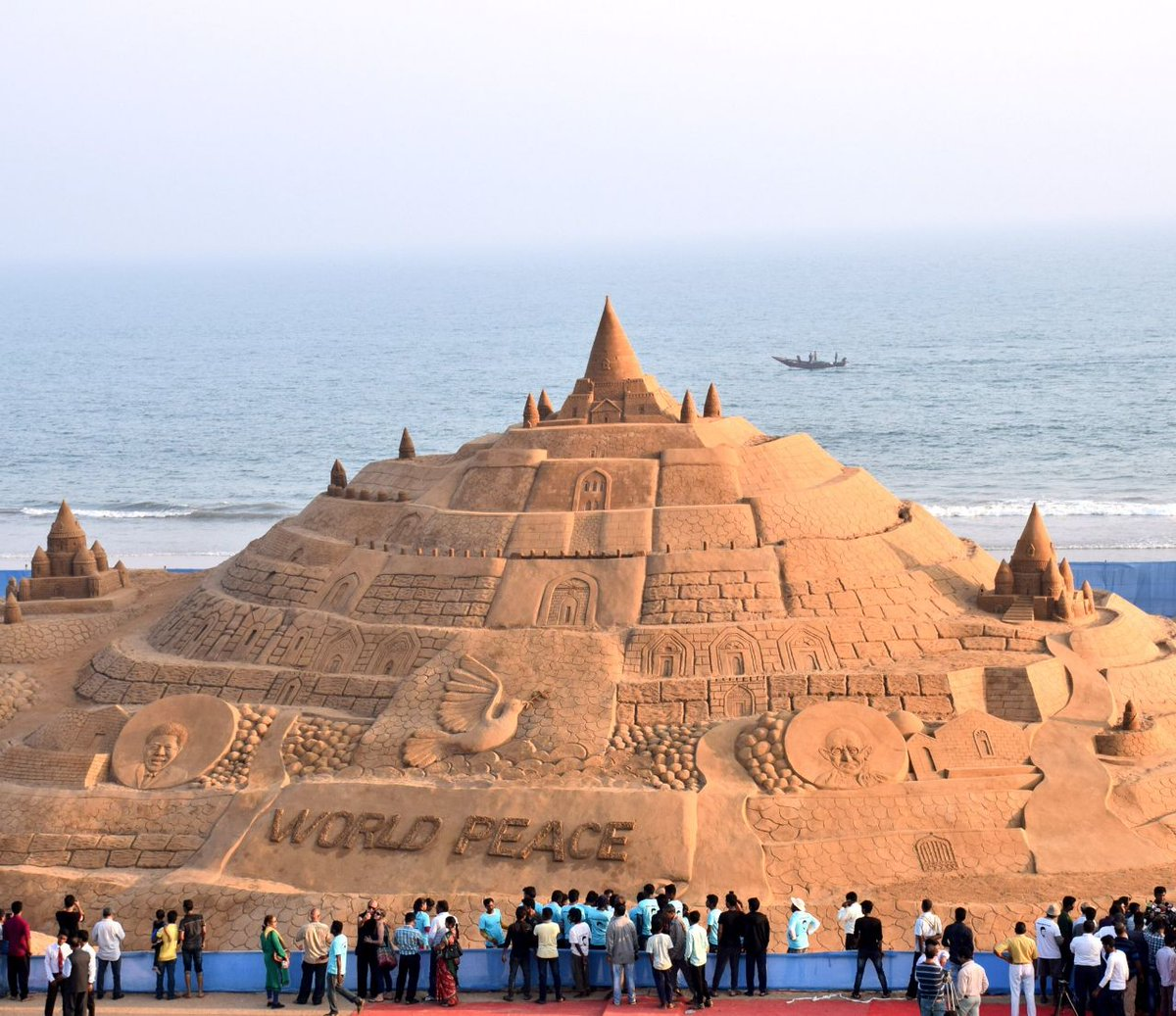
Sand Sculpture By Sudarsana Pattnaik

== Religion ==
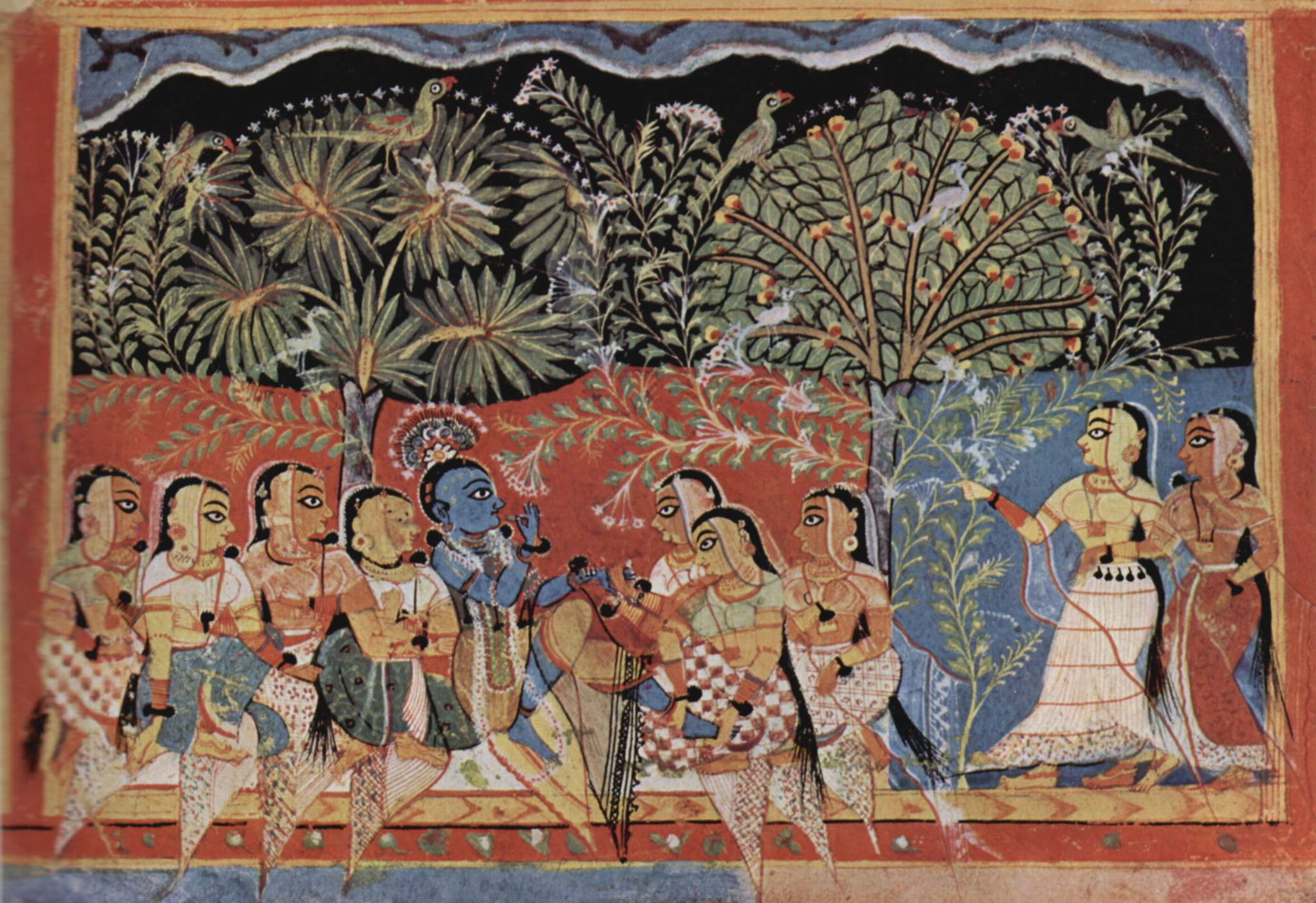
Geeta Gobinda manuscript

In its long history, Odisha has had a continuous tradition of dharmic religions especially Hinduism, Buddhism and Jainism. Ashoka's conquest of Kalinga (India) made Buddhism a principal religion in the state which led to the establishment of numerous Stupas and non religion learning centres. During Kharavela's reign Jainism found prominence. However, by the middle of the 9th century CE there was a revival of Hinduism as attested by numerous temples such as Mukteshwara, Lingaraja, Jagannath and Konark, which were erected starting from the late 7th century CE. Part of the revival in Hinduism was due to Adi Shankaracharya who proclaimed Puri to be one of the four holiest places or Char Dham for Hinduism. Odisha has, therefore, a syncretic mixture of the three dharmic religions as attested by the fact that the Jagannath Temple in Puri is considered to be holy by Hindus, Buddhists and Jains.

Presently, the majority of people in the state of Odisha are Hindus. As per the census of 2001, Odisha is the third largest Hindu-populated state (as a percentage of population) in India. However, while Odisha is predominantly Hindu it is not monolithic. There is a rich cultural heritage in the state owing to the Hindu faith. For example, Odisha is home to several Hindu saints. Sant Bhima Bhoi was a leader of the Mahima sect movement, Sarala Dasa, was the translator of the epic Mahabharata in Odia, Chaitanya Dasa was a Buddhistic-Vaishnava and writer of the Nirguna Mahatmya, Jayadeva was the author of the Gita Govinda and is recognized by the Sikhs as one of their most important bhagats. Swami Laxmananda Saraswati is a modern-day Hindu saint of Adivasi heritage.

Odisha has Christian and Muslim minorities. There are around 898,000 Christians in Odisha (2.44% of the population).

== Literature ==
The history of Odia literature has been mapped by historians along the following stages, Old Odia (900–1300 CE), Early Middle Odia (1300–1500 CE), Middle Odia (1500–1700 CE), Late Middle Odia (1700–1850 CE) and Modern Odia (from 1850 CE till the present). But this crude categorization could not skillfully draw the real picture on account of development and growth of Odia literature. Here, we split the total periods into different stages such as Age of Charya Literature, Age of Sarala Das, Age of Panchasakha, Age of Upendra Bhanja, Age of Radhanath, Age of Satyabadi, Age of Marxism or Pragati yuga, Age of Romanticism or Sabuja Yuga, Post Independent Age.

The beginnings of Odia poetry coincide with the development of Charya Sahitya, the literature thus started by Mahayana Buddhist poets. This literature was written in a specific metaphor named "Sandhya Bhasha" and the poets like Luipa, Kanhupa are from the territory of Odisha. The language of Charya was considered as Prakriti.

The first great poet of Odisha is the famous Sarala Das who wrote the Mahabharata, not an exact translation from the Sanskrit original, but a full-blown independent work. Sarala Mahabharat has 152,000 verses compared to 100,000 in the Sanskrit version. Among many of his poems and epics, he is best remembered for his Sarala Mahabharata. Chandi Purana and the Vilanka Ramayana are also two of his famous creations. Arjuna Das, a contemporary to Sarala Das, wrote Rama-Bibha, a significant long poem in Odia.

Towards the 16th century, five poets emerged, though there is hundreds year gap in between them. But they are known as Panchashakhas as they believed in the same school of thought, Utkaliya Vaishnavism. The poets are Balarama Dasa, Jagannatha Dasa, Achyutananada Dasa, Ananta Dasa and Jasobanta Dasa. The Panchasakhas are very much Vaishnavas by thought. In 1509, Chaitanya, an Odia devotee of Vishnu whose grandfather Madhukar Mishra had emigrated to Bengal, came to Odisha with his Vaishnava message of love. Before him Jayadeva, one of the foremost composers in Sanskrit, had prepared the ground by heralding the cult of Vaishnavism through his Gita Govinda. Chaitanya's path of devotion was known as Raganuga Bhakti Marga, but the Panchasakhas differed from Chaitanya's and believed in Gyana Mishra Bhakti Marga, which has similarities with the Buddhist philosophy of Charya Literature stated above. At the end of the age of Panchasakha, the prominent poets are Dinakrushna Dasa, Upendra Bhanja and Abhimanyu Samanta Singhara. Verbal jugglery, obscenity and eroticism as the characteristics of Shringara Kavyas, became the trend of this period to which Upendra Bhanja took a leading role. His creations were Baidehisha Bilasa, Koti Brahmanda Sundari, Lavanyabati were proved a landmark in Odia literature. Upendra Bhanja was conferred with the title Kabi Samrat of Odia literature for the aesthetic poetic sense and verbal jugglery proficiency. Dinakrushna Das's Rasokallola and Abhimanyu Samanta Simhara's Bidagdha Chintamani are prominent kavya of this time.

The first Odia printing typeset was cast in 1836 by the Christian missionaries which heralded a great revolution in Odia literature, instead of palm leaf inscription. The books were being printed and the periodicals and journals were published. The first Odia Magazine of Bodha Dayini was published from Balasore in 1861. The main object of this magazine was to promote Odia literature and to draw attention to the lapses in government policy. The first Odia paper, The Utkal Deepika made its appearance in 1866 under the editorship of late Gourishankar Ray with the help of late Bichitrananda. The publication of these papers during the last part of the 19th century encouraged the modern literature and acted as a media to provide a wide readers range for the writers, The educated intellectuals came in contact with the English Literature and got influenced. Radhanath Ray (1849–1908) is the prime figure, who tried to write his poems with the influence of Western Literature. He wrote Chandrabhaga, Nandikeshwari, Usha, Mahajatra, Darbar and Chilika was the long poems or Kavyas. Fakir Mohan Senapati (1843–1918), the prime figure of modern Odia Fiction Prose is the product of that generation. He was considered the Vyasakabi or founder poet of Odia language. Fakir Mohan Senapati is well known for his novel Chha Maana Atha Guntha. It is the first Indian novel to deal with the exploitations of landless peasants by the Feudal Lords. It was written much before the October revolution of Russia or much before the emerging of Marxist ideas in India.

With the rise of a freedom movement, a literary thought emerged with the influence of Gandhiji, and idealistic trend of Nationalism formed as a new trend in Odia literature. Much respected personality of Odishan culture and history, Utkalmani Gopabandhu Dash (1877–1928) had founded a school at a village Satyabadi near Sakshigopal of Odisha and an idealistic literary movement influenced the writers of this age. Godabarisha Mohapatra, Kuntala Kumari Sabat is the other renowned names of this age. The progressive movement in Odia literature was initiated with the formation of the Nabajuga Sahitya Sansad in 1935. The main proponents of Nabajuga Sahitya Sansad were Ananta Patnaik and Bhagabati Panigrahi, while they were students at Ravenshaw College. Thereafter many others joined in. The mouthpiece of Nabajuga Sahitya Sansad was Adhunika. Bhagabati Panigrahi was the editor and Ananta Patnaik was the managing editor of Adhunika. Ananta Patnaik was mainly a poet though he has written many short stories as well as dramas. Bhagabati Panigrahi was mainly a short story writer. Influenced by the romantic thoughts of Rabindranath Tagore, during the thirties when the progressive Marxian movements were in full flow in Odia literature, Kalindi Charan Panigrahi, the brother of Bhagabati Charan Panigrahi, the founder of Marxian Trend in Odisha, formed a group during 1920 called Sabuja Samiti. Mayadhar Mansingh was a renowned poet of that time though he was considered as a romantic poet, he kept the distance away from the influence of Rabindranath Tagore successfully. As the successor of Sachi babu, two poets Guruprasad Mohanty (popularly known as Guru Prasad) (1924–2004) and Bhanuji Rao came with T. S. Eliot and published their co-authored poetry book Nutan Kabita. Later, Ramakanta Rath modified the ideas. Sitakanta Mohapatra, Soubhagya Kumar Mishra, Rajendra Kishore Panda, Brajanath Rath, Jayanta Mahapatra, Kamalakant Lenka, J. P. Das, Brahmotri Mohanty, Mamata Dash, Amaresh Patnaik, Goutam Jena, Hrushikesh Mallick, Sunil Kumar Prusty, Sucheta Mishra, Aparna Mohanty, Pritidhara Samal, Basudev Sunni, Gajanan Mishra, Bharat Majhi are some poets of this contemporary age. In the Post-Independence era Odia fiction assumed a new direction. The trend which Fakir Mohan had started actually developed more after the 1950s. Gopinath Mohanty (1914–1991), Surendra Mohanty and Manoj Das (1934–2021) are considered as three jewels of this time. The other significant fiction writers are Chandrasekhar Rath, Shantanu Acharya, Mohapatra Nilamani Sahoo, Rabi Patnaik, Jagadish Mohanty, Kanheilal Das, Satya Mishra, Ramchandra Behera, Padmaja Pal, Gourahari Das, Ajay Swain, Paresh Patnaik, Shyamaprasad Choudhury, Yashodhara Mishra and Sarojini Sahoo are few writers whose writings have created a new age in the field of fiction. After 1970, the women wing of Odia writers emerged as a prime voice of feminism. Jayanti Ratha, Susmita Bagchi, Paramita Satpathy, Hiranmayee Mishra, Chirashree Indrasingh, Supriya Panda, Gayatri Saraf, Mamata Choudhury are few fiction writers in this period. But, among all the women writers Sarojini Sahoo played a significant role for her feministic and sexuality approach in fiction. For feminism she is considered as the Simone de Beauvoir of India, though theoretically, she denies the Hegelian theory of "Others" developed by Simone in her The Second Sex. Unlike to Simone, Sarojini claims the women are "Others" from masculine perspective but as a human being, she demands similar right as Plato recommended.

In the field of drama, the traditional Odia theatre is the folk opera, or Jatra, which flourishes in the rural areas of Odisha. Modern theatre is no longer commercially viable. But in 1960, experimental theatre made a mark through the works of Manoranjan Das, who pioneered the new theatre movement with his brand of experimentalism. Bijay Mishra, Biswajit Das, Kartik Rath, Ramesh Chandra Panigrahi, Ratnakar Chaini, Ranjit Patnaik continued the tradition.

== Performing arts ==
=== Music ===
Odissi music is the traditional classical music of the state of Ganda Odisha. Born as a seva in the Jagannatha temple of Puri, it was developed by great composers such as Jayadeva, Upendra Bhanja, Dinakrusna Dasa.

As a part of the culture of Odisha, its music comprises several categories. Odissi music is over two thousand five hundred years old. Its five broad categories are Tribal Music, Folk music, Light Music, Light-Classical Music, and Classical Music. Understanding the culture of Odisha involves accounting for its music, which forms part of its history.

In ancient times, some saint-poets wrote the lyrics of poems and songs that were sung to rouse the religious feelings of people. It was by the eleventh century that the music of Odisha, in the form of Triswari, Chatuhswari, and Panchaswari, underwent a transformation and was converted into the classical style.

Folk music like Jogi Gita, Kendara Gita, Dhuduki Badya, Prahallada Nataka, Pala, Sankirtana, Mogal Tamasa, Gitinatya, Kandhei Nacha, Kela Nacha, Ghoda Nacha, Danda Nacha and Daskathia are popular in Odisha.

Almost every tribal group has its own distinct song and dance style.

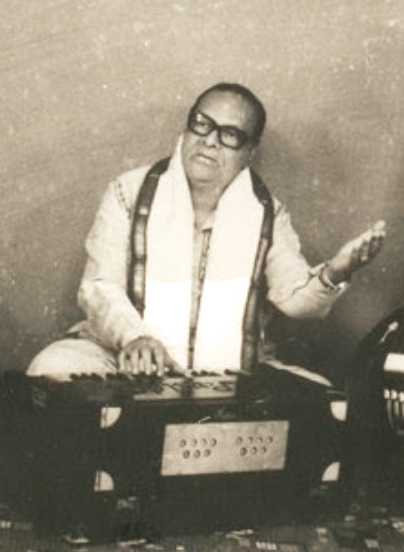
Sangita Sudhakara Balakrushna Das Odissi music singer, master and performer.

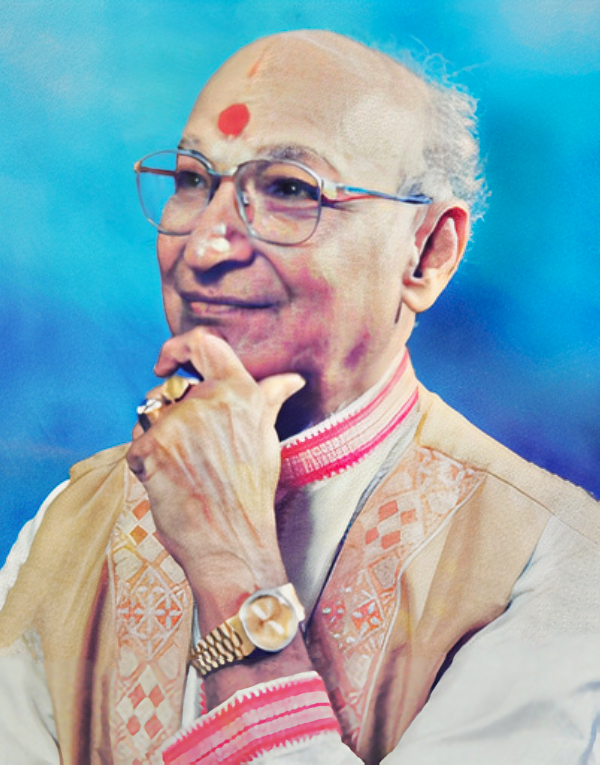
Odissi music Guru Pt Raghunath Panigrahi eminent odissi music singer

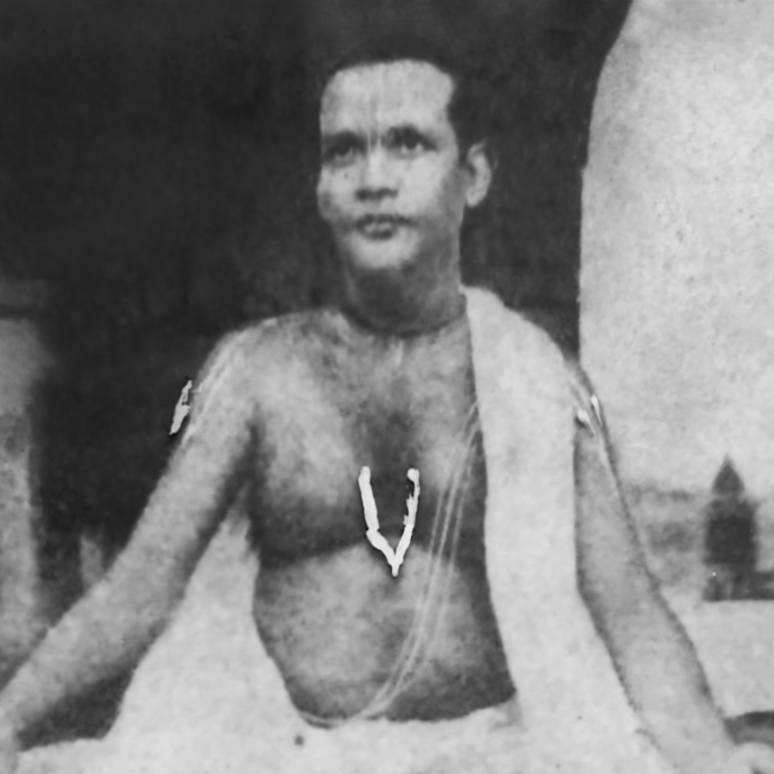
Mohan Sundar Deb Goswami Odissi music & dance Guru, music composer, film director. He made the first odia fim sitabibaha

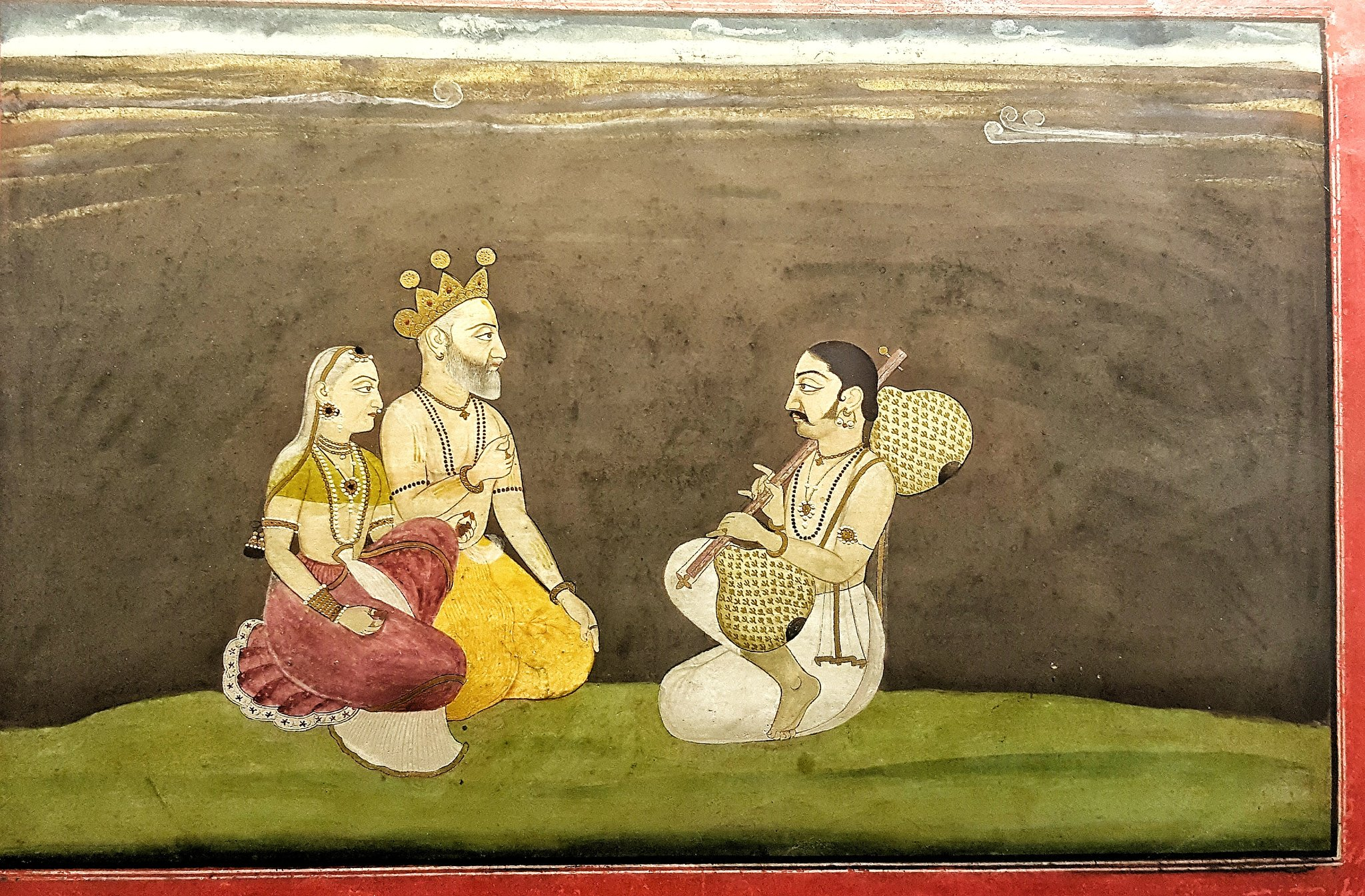
Jayadeva with his parents by Artist manaku

Shagadiara Katha, an Odia folk story narrated by Ratnakar Sutar

=== Dance ===
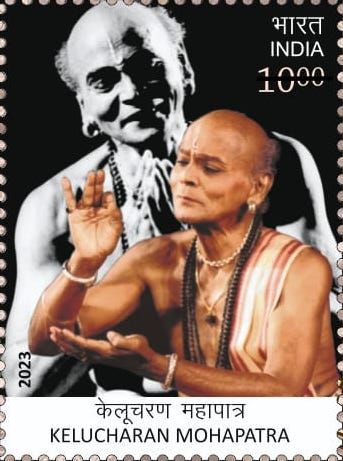
Legendary dancer and guru of Odissi, kelucharan mohapatra

Odissi dance and music are classical forms. Odissi has a tradition of 2,000 years, and finds mention in the Natyashastra of Bharatamuni, possibly written circa 200 BCE. However, the dance form nearly became extinct during the British period, only to be revived after India's independence by a few proponents, such as Guru Deba Prasad Das, Guru Pankaj Charan Das, Guru Raghunath Dutta and Kelucharan Mohapatra. Odissi classical dance is about the divine love of Krishna and his consort Radha, mostly drawn from compositions by the notable Odia poet Jayadeva, who lived in the 12th century CE.

Chhou dance is a form of tribal (martial) dance attributed to origins in Mayurbhanj princely state of Odisha and seen in the Indian states of West Bengal, Jharkhand and Odisha. There are three subtypes of the dance, based on the original places where the subtypes were developed. Seraikella Chhou was developed in Seraikella, the administrative head of the Seraikela Kharsawan district of Jharkhand, Purulia Chhou in Purulia district of West Bengal and Mayurbhanj Chhou in Mayurbhanj district of Odisha.

Mahari Dance is one of the important dance forms of Odisha. Mahari dance originated in the temples of Odisha. History of Odisha provides evidence of the Devadasi cult in Odisha. Devadasis were dancing girls who were dedicated to the temples of Odisha. The Devadasis in Odisha were known as Maharis and the dance performed by them came to be known as Mahari Dance.

It was during the reign of Chodagangadeva, Maharis was employed in the temples of Puri. After Chodagangadeva's death, Ananabhimadeva built Natyamandapa in the Jagannath temple for the dance performances inside the temple. Moreover, in those days, the Mahari dancers belonged to different categories namely, the Nachunis (dancers), the Bahara Gauni, the Bhitara Gauni and the Gaudasanis.

The Mahari Dancers of Odisha are supposed to follow certain restrictions, such as:

- They should dance on the ceremonies connected to Lord Jagannath.
- They should adhere to the specifications made by the Shastras.
- They must always wear clean clothes.
- The dancer cannot be physically handicapped.
- At the time of the performances, the dancers are not supposed to look at the audience.
- The Maharis are married to the Lord at the age of nine.
- Before their performances, the Mahari dancers pay their obeisance to the Lord.

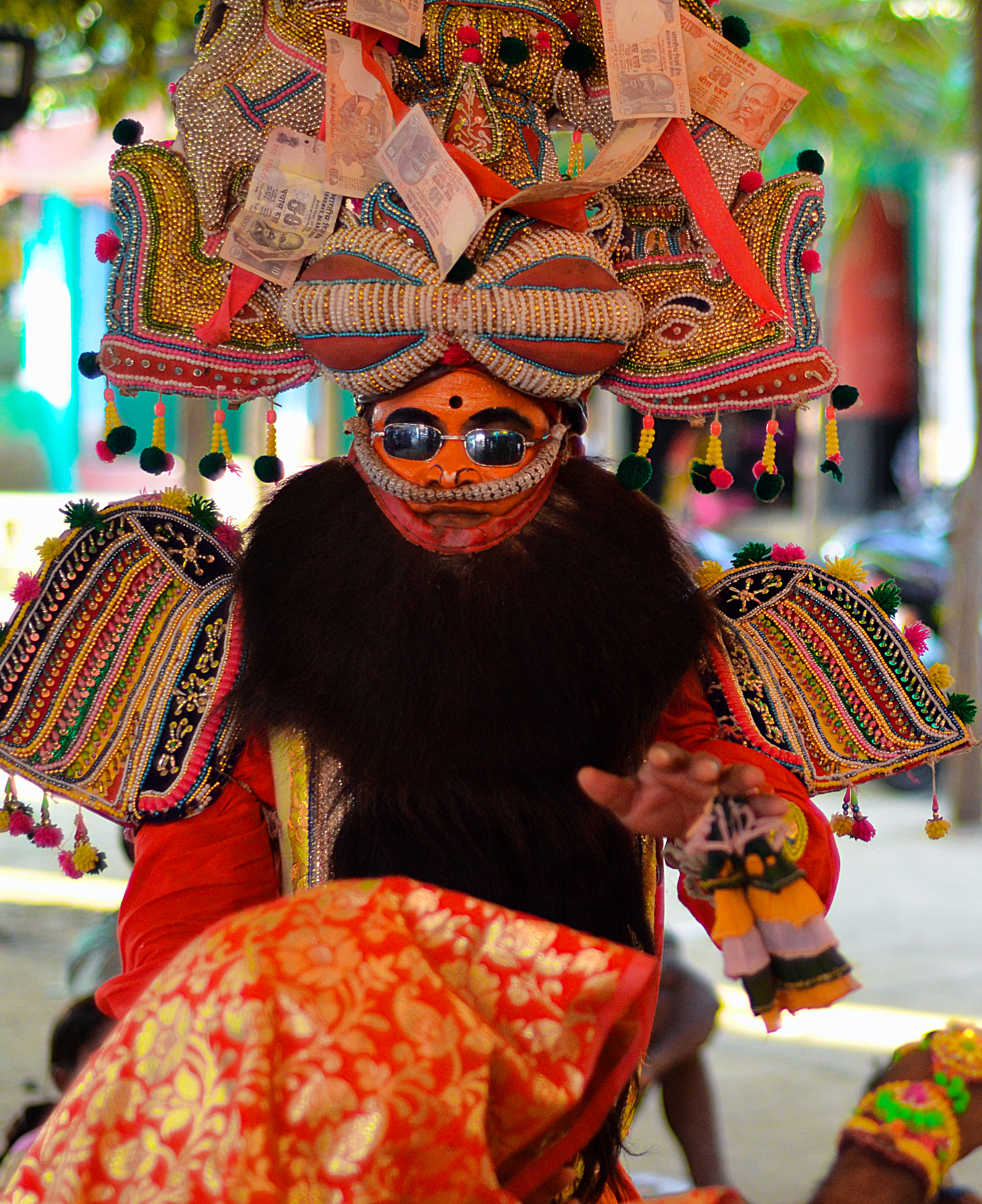
Prahallada Nataka, traditional theatre form the Ganjam district of Odisha

In Odisha, one can also come across another type of Mahari dancers, who are known as Samarpada Niyoga. The duty of the Samarpada Niyoga is to dance during the ceremonial procession of the deities. These dancers perform during the Ratha Yatra, Jhulana Yatra, Dola Yatra, etc.

Western Odisha has also a great variety of dance forms unique to Odisha culture. The children's verses are known as "Chhiollai", "Humobauli" and "Doligit"; the adolescent poems are "Sajani", "Chhata", "Daika", "Bhekani"; the youth compositions are "Rasarkeli", "Jaiphul", "Maila Jada", "Bayamana", "Gunchikuta" and "Dalkhai"; the workman's poetry comprises "Karma" and "Jhumer" about Lord Vishwakarma and the "Karamashani" Goddess. The professional entertainers perform Dand, Danggada, Mudgada, Ghumra, Sadhana, Sabar–Sabarein, Disdigo, Machina–Bajnia, Samparda and Sanchar. They are performed during all occasions with varieties of rhythm and rhyme.

Pala is a unique form of balladry in Odisha, which artistically combines elements of theatre, classical Odissi music, highly refined Odia and Sanskrit poetry, wit, and humour. The literal meaning of Pala is turned. It is more sophisticated than the other Odia ballad tradition, Daskathia. Pala can be presented in three different ways. First one is known as Baithaki Pala or 'seated', in which the performers sit on the ground throughout. The other one is Thia Pala or `standing`, which is considerably more popular and aesthetically more satisfying. The third one is called the Badi Pala, which is a kind of Thia Pala, in which two groups vie for excellence. This is the most entertaining, as there is an element of competition.

Gotipua dance is another form of dance in Odisha. In Odia colloquial language Gotipua means single boy. The dance performance done by a single boy is known as Gotipua dance. When decadence and declination came in to Devadasi or Mahari tradition due to various reasons this Gotipua dance tradition evolved as a sequel as these performances were practised to please God. It is totally unknown that when exactly this danced form came in to practice. Still, some historians say that this dance tradition appears to have originated during the region of Prataprudradev (1497 CE to 1540 CE) and gained popularity in the subsequent Muslim rule. Ray Remananda the famous Vaishnavite Minister of King Pratapruda and ardent follower of Sri Chaitanya is the originator of this boy dancing tradition, as the Vaishnavas were not approving of the females into dance practices so it possible that the dance tradition must have come after Sri Chaitanya came to Odisha. The Gotipua Dance Tradition is now seen in the village Raghurajpur situated 10 km away from Puri town, situated on the banks of river Bhargabi. It is otherwise known as the Crafts Village as various Odishan handicrafts’ craftsmen reside in this village contributing their expertise in Pattachitra painting and other handicrafts.

Jhumair is a folk dance from North and Western Odisha. It is performed during harvest season and festivals.

A Pala, the traditional Odia folk ballad performance

=== Puppetry ===
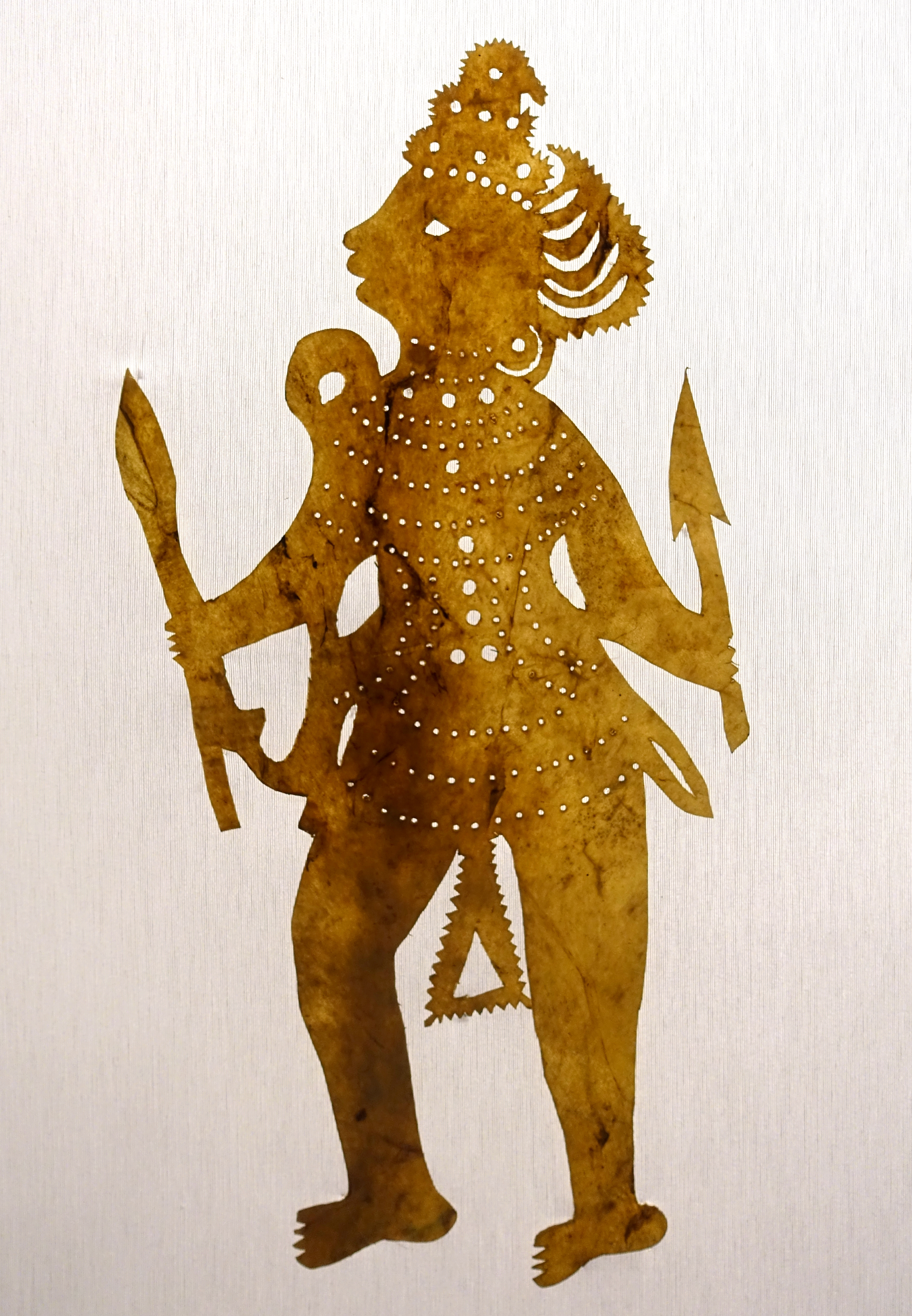
Rama, Ravana Chhaya.

Ravana Chhaya is a traditional shadow puppetry art form from the eastern state of Odisha which literally means 'the shadow of Ravana' and is named after the evil king of the Hindu epic Ramayana.

Puppets are Made of deer skin or goat hide, they are flat, cut-out figures with delicate designs, and no joints or color. They are usually about 2 feet tall. Performance is held at night, the puppets are held behind a white cloth screen, and a light source casts their shadows onto the screen. Traditional Oriya folk music, using instruments like dhol, khanjani, and flute.

Its one of India's oldest surviving shadow puppet traditions, believed to be over 500 years old and more.

There are various different puppetry tradition in Odisha such as Sakhi kandhei, gopalila, Chadar Badar (by the Santhal community) and more.

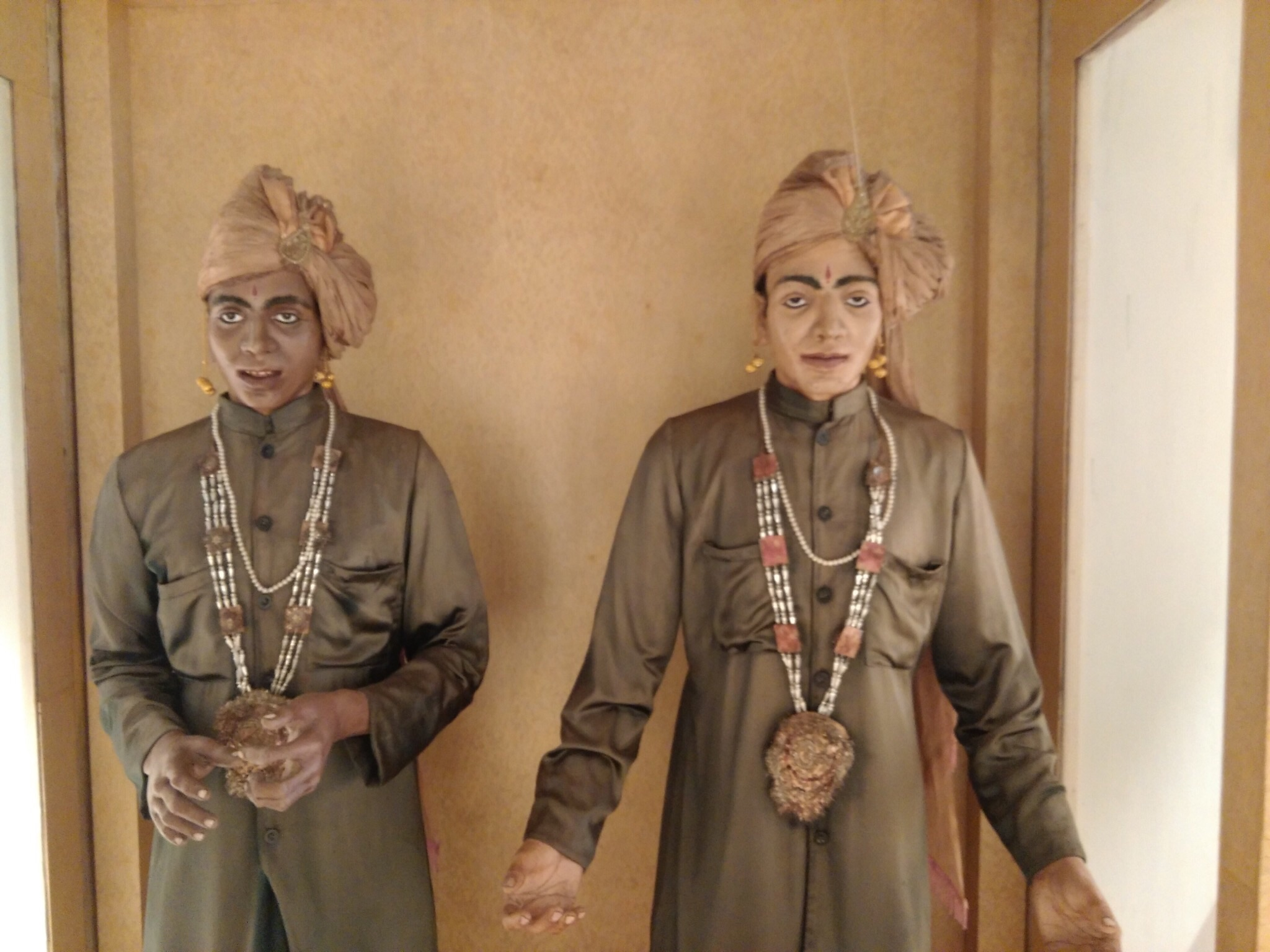
Dasakathia ballad singers

=== Odia cinema ===
The Odia film production in the initial years was very slow. After the first Odia film Sita Bibaha, only two films were produced until 1951. A joint consortium of landlords and businessmen who collected fund after 1948 produced those two movies. The 1951 production Roles to Eight was the first Odia film having an English name. It was released after 15 years of the first Odia film Sita Bibaha. It was the fourth Odia film produced by Ratikanta Padhi. The eleventh Odia film Sri Lokenath was the first Odia film, which got National Award in 1960 directed by Prafulla Sengupta.

The name of Prashanta Nanda would always come while dealing with Odia Film Industry. He was present in Odia films since 1939, but he became active only after 1976. Nanda served Odia Film Industry as an actor, director, screenplay writer, and lyricist and as a playback singer. Uttam Mohanty, whose debut film Abhiman won accolades, was one of the heroes of the Odia Film Industry. His wife Aparajita Mohanty is a successful leading lady of Odia films.

== Odisha cuisine ==
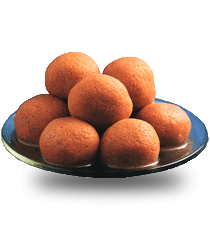
Salepur Rasagola, famous throughout India originated from Odisha

Odisha has a culinary tradition spanning centuries. The kitchen of the famous Jagannath Temple in Puri is reputed to be the largest in the world, with a thousand chefs, working around 752 wood-burning clay hearths called chulas, to feed over 1,00,000 people each day.

Rasagola, one of the most popular desserts in India, is an extension of the early cuisine of Odisha and later West Bengal. It had been enjoyed and originated in Odisha for centuries and later extended into neighbouring Bengal, like the well-known odia rice pudding, kheeri (kheer), that is relished all over India.

Chena Poda is another famous sweet delicacy in Odisha with the origin from Nayagarh District, Odisha.

Pakhala, a dish made of rice, water, and yoghurt, that is fermented overnight, is very popular in summer, particularly in the rural areas. Odias are very fond of sweets and no Odia repast is considered complete without some dessert at the end. A typical meal in Odisha consists of a main course and dessert. Typically bread is served as the main course for breakfast, whereas rice is eaten with lentils (dals) during lunch and dinner. The main course also includes one or more curries, vegetables and pickles. Given the fondness for sweet foods, the dessert course may include generous portions of more than a single item. Odia desserts are made from a variety of ingredients, with milk, chhenna (a form of ricotta cheese), coconut, rice, and wheat flour being the most common.

== Clothing ==
Ethnic female and male cloth draping style in Odisha.

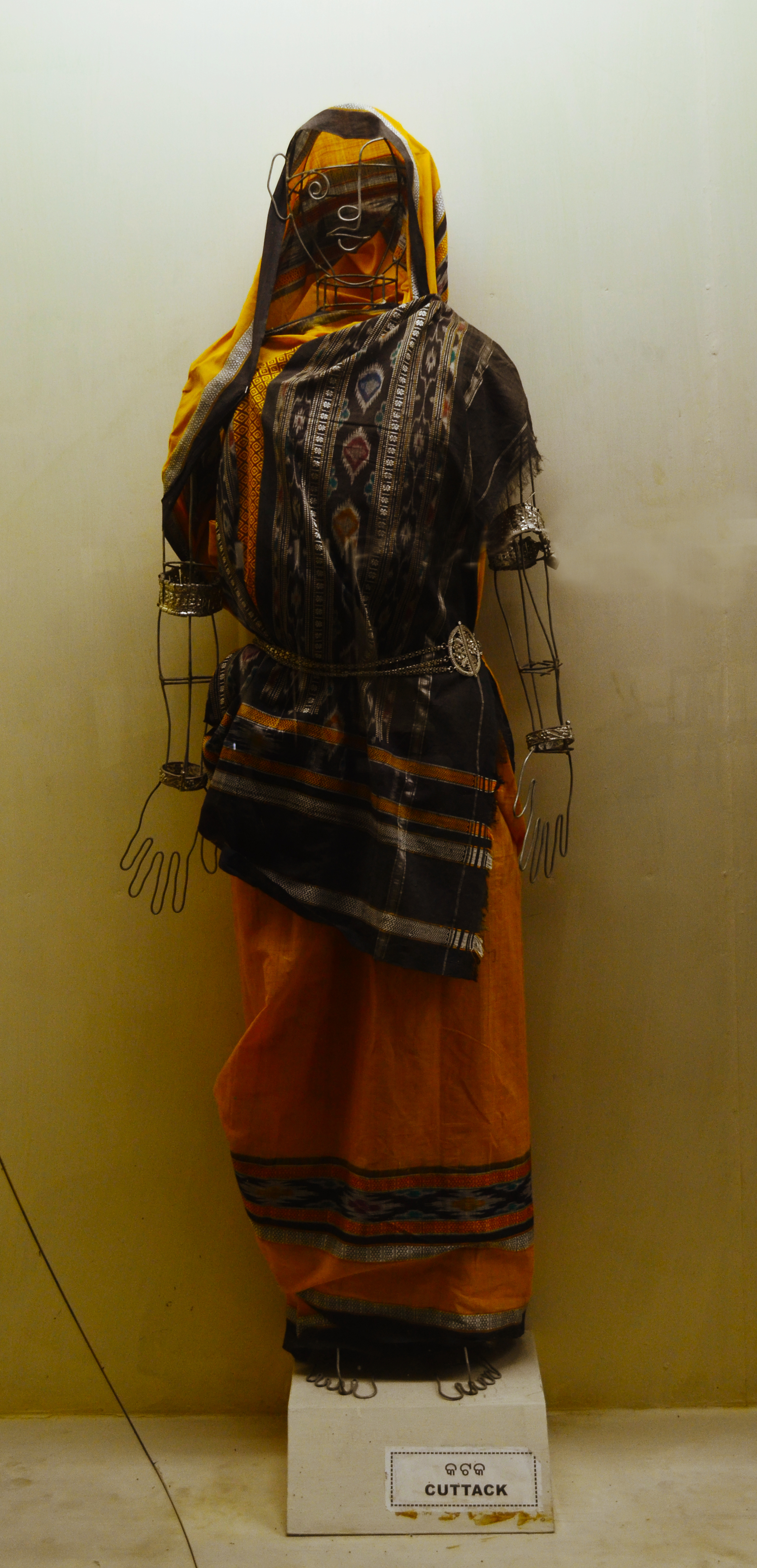
Traditional sari draping style of Cuttack.

The western-style dress has gained greater acceptance in cities and towns among men, although the people prefer to wear traditional dresses like Dhoti, Kurtha and Gamucha during festivals or other religious occasions. Women normally prefer to wear the Sari Sambalpuri Sari, or the Shalwar kameez; western attire is becoming popular among younger women in cities and towns.

The Saree of Odisha is much in demand throughout the entire world. The different colours and varieties of sarees in Odisha make them very popular among the women of the state. The handloom sarees available in Odisha can be of four major types; these are Sambalpuri kapta, Sambalpuri Bandha, Sambalpuri Bomkai and Sambalpuri Saptaper. Odisha sarees are also available in other colours like cream, maroon, brown and rust. The tie-and-dye technique used by the weavers of Odisha to create motifs on these sarees is unique to this region. This technique also gives the sarees of Odisha an identity of their own.

== See also ==
- List of folk dances of Odisha
- Odia Hindu wedding
