= Maalika =

Hindu religious texts

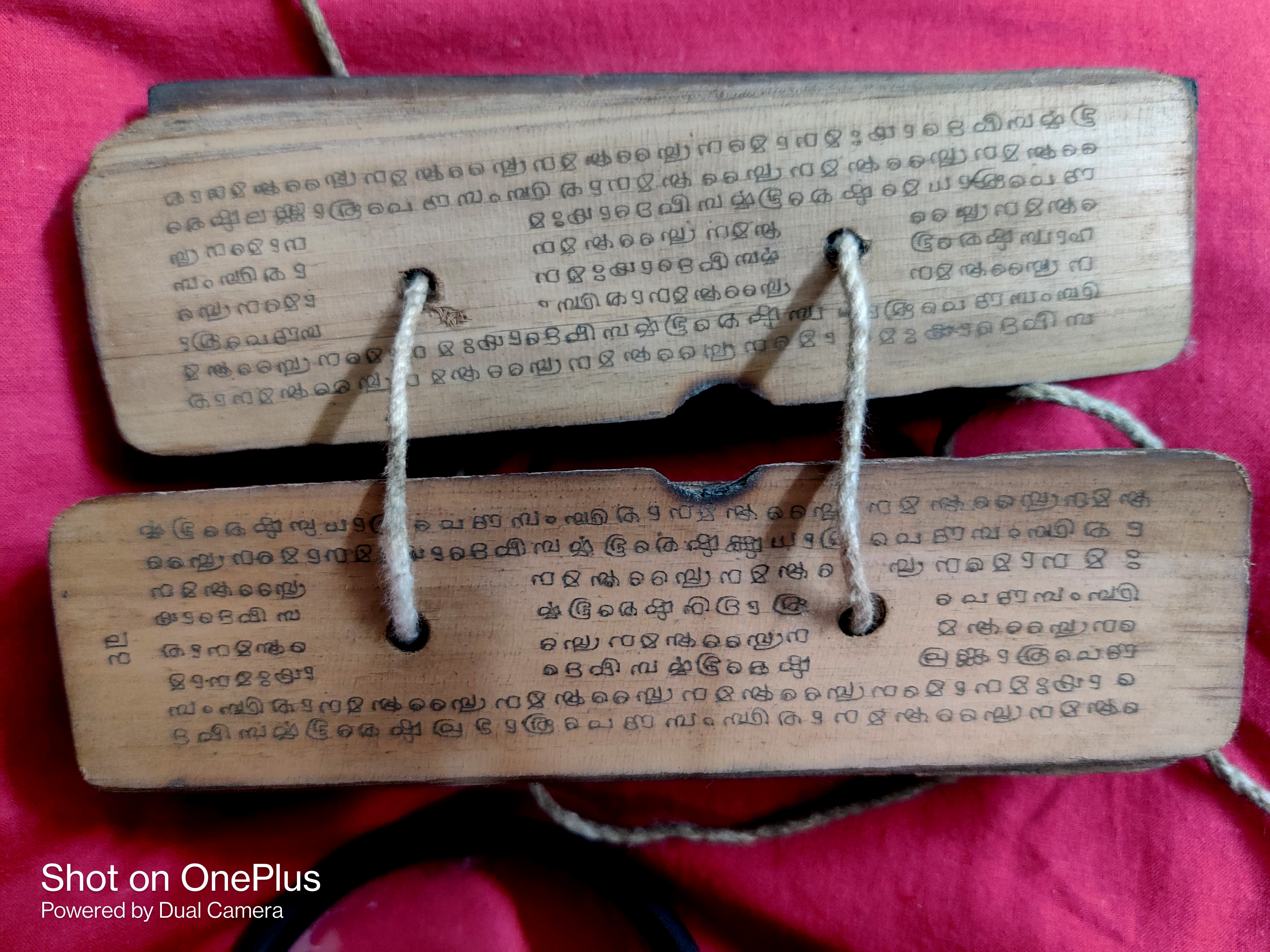
Malika in original form was written by the Panchsakhas on Palm Leaf.

'Maalika', or Bhavishya Malika, is an ancient text written in the 16th century during the reign of the Suryavamsa Gajapati ruler, Emperor Prataparudra Deva (1497 - 1540 CE) in the ancient Odia language by the Panchasakha - Saint Achyutananda Das, Saint Ananta Das, Saint Jasobanta Dasa, Saint Jagannath Das and Saint Balaram Das in Odisha. In the Utkaliya Vaishnavite tradition and Odia spiritual tradition, the Panchasakhas are revered as the cosmic reincarnations of the five Pandavas from the Mahabharata, born again to democratize spiritual knowledge and document prophetic insights for the transition into the next cosmic cycle.

Bhavishya Maalika mentions the prophecies of the Sanātanī Saints, which include predictions about the future. These texts mention the global transformation and arrival of Lord Kalki for the re-establishment of righteousness and the rise of the Satya Yuga (Golden Period) by 2032 AD.

Saint Achyutananda Das was revered as a Trikaaldarshi for his ability to see the past, present, and future. Saint Achyutananda Das and his contemporaries documented these prophetic insights in the palm-leaf Malika texts. .

== Prophecies ==
Bhavishya Malika contains many prophecies that offer insights into the decline of Kali Yuga, a potential apocalypse, the third world war, and the appearance of Lord Kalki.

Achyutananda Das Ji highlighted several indicators believed to signal the culmination of Kaliyuga, the current age according to Hindu belief. These signs typically include:

1. Social Instability: An increase in societal unrest, conflicts, and instability.
2. Erosion of Religious Values: Decline in adherence to spiritual and moral principles, leading to a weakening of religious practices.
3. Prevalence of Unrighteousness: Rise in unethical behaviour, dishonesty, and disregard for dharma (righteousness).
4. Widespread Corruption: Rampant corruption in governance, societal institutions, and everyday life.
5. Religious Practices: Traditional deity worship may diminish, giving way to more unconventional or alternative forms of spirituality.
6. Role Reversal: An intriguing prophecy indicates that the boundaries of gender roles may blur, with men potentially bearing children—a profound shift in natural and societal norms.
7. Infidelity: Extramarital relationships may become increasingly normalized, reflecting a broader shift in societal attitudes toward commitment and fidelity.

Along with these there are many more such signs that indicate the end of the Kaliyug.

== Transformations in the Nature , planets and constellations ==
Bhavishya Malika also mentions certain happenings in the nature and the planets by the end of Kali Yuga . The following are a few of the mentions of the incidences that will happen at the end of Kali Yuga.

1. The sun's heat will intensify, shining with tenfold strength.
2. For seven days and nights, the Sun and Moon will vanish, plunging the Earth into total darkness.
3. There will be 64 distinct epidemics that will sweep across Earth.

== Incidences that will happen in places of worship ==
A few of the Predicted Events in Places of Worship During Kaliyuga

- Numerous temples will be hit by lightning strikes.
- Wicked deeds will be carried out even within the sacred walls of temples.
- Due to the rise in sin and unrighteous acts, the deities will withdraw from their shrines.
- In certain temples the flags will be hit and hence burnt due to lightning.

Many more such incidences are said to take place along with the above.

== The upcoming moral decline ==
In the Kali Yuga, the Bhavishya Malika highlights a breakdown in the traditional Guru-shishya (teacher-disciple) bond. The text observes that the 'Guru' title is often treated as a commodity for profit rather than a sacred calling. It points to the rapid growth of unconventional spiritual movements and new religious paths that often disregard established Shastras and Puranas, which the authors argue can lead followers away from authentic teachings. Moreover, the text mentions that some of these movements rely on spectacle, occult influences, or manipulative tactics to gain influence, interpreting these trends as the work of the Kali Purusha to erode long-standing spiritual foundations.

The Bhavishya Malika explains that the traditional 432,000-year span of the Kali Yuga is dramatically cut short by the weight of human sin. According to this text, moral and spiritual failures burn through the era's allotted time, leading to a total deduction of 427,000 years and leaving only 5,000 years for the actual experience of the age.

The text details how specific transgressions contribute to this temporal decay:

- Lying accounts for a deduction of 5,000 years.
- Bathing naked in the Ganges is associated with a 12,000-year reduction.
- Intimate relations between a Brahmin and a person of another caste are listed as causing a 30,000-year reduction.
- Betraying a friend deducts 6,000 years.
- Neglecting to worship the idol of Lord Maha-Vishnu results in a 17,000-year reduction.
- Failing to worship Maa Tulsi and the holy Tulsi plant reduces the timeline by 5,000 years.
- Not serving a guest causes a 6,000-year reduction.
- Betraying one's own brother accounts for 40,000 years.
- Consuming forbidden foods like meat leads to an 8,000-year reduction.
- Usurping the wealth of others deducts 10,000 years.
- The sin of cow slaughter is responsible for a 100,000-year reduction.
- Misusing charity leads to a deduction of 14,000 years.
- Wrongs committed against widows deduct 24,000 years.
- Killing creatures is associated with an 11,000-year reduction.
- Intimate relations that violate the established rules of caste, religion, and creed reduce the timeline by 12,000 years.
- Feticide causes a 7,000-year reduction.
- Killing women is listed as a 32,000-year deduction.
- Illegally possessing land designated for cow grazing or as a crematorium results in a 40,000-year reduction.
- Abducting one's own mother deducts 5,000 years.
- Betraying others in general accounts for a 40,000-year reduction.
- Acts such as patricide, matricide, and various other sins result in a 3,000-year deduction.

=== Ascendancy of Adharma and the Reduction of Kali Yuga's Lifespan ===
In traditional Odia literature, the Hari Arjuna Chautisa depicts a prophetic dialogue where Shri Krishna describes the moral decay and apocalyptic end of the Kali Yuga to Arjuna. This prophetic discourse is traditionally understood to have taken place after the Kurukshetra war of Mahabharata, shortly before Krishna's departure from the mortal world. A central doctrine of the Bhavishya Malika, as expounded by the Panchasakha, is the acceleration and premature termination of the Kali Yuga. While classical Hindu Puranas such as the Vishnu Purana and Bhagavata Purana calculate the total lifespan of Kali Yuga as 432,000 human years, the Bhavishya Malika asserts the era will end after more than 5,000 years. The texts explain that the density of human Pap (sin), Adharma (unrighteousness), and kapat (deception) burns through the epoch's spiritual lifespan, compressing time and forcing an transition into the Satya Yuga.

- The Accumulation of Sin and Moral Decay: The literature states the catalyst for this temporal compression is the degradation of human behavior. Prophecies describe an era where trust dissolves and hypocrisy dominates institutions. Humanity will experience a decline in purity, characterized by addiction, the breakdown of family structures, and the abandonment of spiritual duties. The texts warn that children will neglect parents and relationships will be driven by material greed, lust, and personal gain.
- The Influence of Demonic Powers and Spiritual Deception: The text focuses heavily on how dark, materialistic energies specifically the influence of the Kali Purusha and Asuri Shakti (Demonic Power) which manipulate human leadership and psychology. True devotion is replaced by the commercialization of spirituality, where unqualified individuals adopt religious symbols to execute fraud, exploit the vulnerable, and amass wealth. This shift toward atheism and the ridicule of sacred traditions transforms the environment and accelerates cosmic decay.
- The Cosmic Timeline and Divine Cleansing: According to the Panchasakha manuscripts, when adharma reaches a saturation point, the natural five elements will collapse, triggering pandemics, tectonic upheavals, and geopolitical warfare. This concentration of dark energies necessitates intervention by the tenth avatar of Vishnu, Lord Kalki, to dismantle the corrupt global order defined as Kali Bharat and re-establish a unified administration rooted in righteousness by the threshold of 2032 AD.

== Disaster that humanity has to face by the end of Kaliyuga. ==
There are a lot of challenges mentioned in the prophecies of Maalika that are imminent for the humanity to face. A few of them are mentioned as follows

- Farmers will stop farming as disheartened by erratic rainfall.
- Intensified Global Heat
- Increasing threats from wild animal and snake attacks due to habitat loss, deforestation, and climate change.
- Glacier fragmentation and polar ice melt will accelerate due to global warming, contributing to rising sea levels and extreme weather events.
- Increased forest fires worldwide and devastating floods.
- The outbreak of a third world war lasting six years and six months. The conflict will divide the globe into two opposing powers, with India joining the war 13 months after its onset against a powerful adversary.

== Initiation of New Era and Geopolitical Prophecies ==
The text outlines a structured, chronological timeline detailing a global military conflict frequently interpreted by contemporary commentators as a World War III predicted to last for a specific duration of six years and six months. According to the scriptures, the catalyst for this geopolitical restructuring is heavily tied to specific astrological alignments, planetary transits, and celestial phenomena that directly alter human psychology and leadership behavior.

The texts predict that a global coalition of thirteen nations, acting alongside China, will initiate widespread military offensives in South Asia, fueled by escalating communal and religious tensions. India is foretold to remain structurally isolated from the active combat zones for the initial thirteen months of the conflict before executing a large-scale military counteroffensive. The prophecy asserts that this defensive response will ultimately result in the dismantling of opposing alliances, the dissolution of China's contemporary political borders, and the establishment of a unified administrative and spiritual territory under Indian leadership, traditionally defined as Akhand Bharat.

=== Saturn's Transit and the Psychology of Overconfidence ===
The text establishes that the foundational shift into the cosmic "Death Cycle" (Maha-Vinasha) is triggered by the movement of Saturn (Shani):

- The March 29, 2025 Transit: The definitive planetary countdown already occurred when Saturn formally transited out of Aquarius(Kumbha Rashi) and entered Pisces (Meena Rashi). This alignment is textually cited as the starting key for global instability and the fracturing of international alliances.
- The Shadow War Threshold: Within the chronological framework of the text, initial proxy border conflicts are interpreted by contemporary Malika analysts as the opening phase of this alignment's kinetic energy. Specifically, the real-world 2025 Pahalgam attack on April 22, 2025, and the subsequent Indo-Pakistani military escalations are viewed as a physical manifestation of this predicted "Shadow War" preceding the open global conflict.
- Induced Rulership Overconfidence: A core scriptural mechanic of this transit is its direct psychological distortion of global leaders. The text states that the spiritual frequency of Meena-Shani induces an acute state of delusion and arrogant overconfidence (Ahamkar) within the leadership of the invading coalition forces. Misinterpreting their initial strategic dominance and economic strength as absolute, these rulers are predicted to fall into a psychological trap of pride, completely rejecting diplomatic peace treaties and ceasefire compromises. This scriptural overconfidence is what directly blinds them into overextending their militaries, ultimately driving them into an unavoidable, destructive trap.

=== The Conjunction of Eclipses and Krishna Paksha Amavasya ===
The text dictates that the active, kinetic phase of warfare and widespread tectonic destruction requires a dual cosmic trigger to strip the Earth of its protective spiritual barriers:

- The Double Eclipse Window (Yugala Grahana): The literature specifies a devastating omen where a solar eclipse (Surya Grahana) and a lunar eclipse (Chandra Grahana) manifest within a single 13 to 14-day lunar fortnight. This rapid succession of cosmic shadows is described as an unsettling frequency that shatters geopolitical stability and sparks impulsive, aggressive military declarations.
- The Convergence on Krishna Paksha Amavasya: The absolute peak of planetary vulnerability and the launch of covert, unexpected military strikes are textually bound to the Krishna Paksha Amavasya (the darkest night of the waning moon's fortnight). The text explains that during this specific lunar alignment, the absence of lunar light coincides with peak atmospheric and psychic darkness, providing the energetic window where regional defense networks collapse and calculated invasions are executed under total tactical cover.

=== Atmospheric Anomalies and Macro-Timeline Thresholds ===
Beyond human military movements, the ultimate transition into the Satya Yuga is driven by cataclysmic atmospheric and structural updates calculated across a specific macro-timeline:

- The Astronomical Threshold of Krishna Paksha Amavasya and the Twin-Eclipse Window: Prophecies within the Bhavishya Malika attribute major institutional and geopolitical shifts to specific astronomical alignments rather than fixed calendar dates. Modern analysts of the Bhavishya Malika interpret these ancient writings as warnings about major global and political changes tied to specific movements of the stars. These interpretations suggest that during the monsoon season, when a krishna paksha Amavasya (a new moon night) lines up with a solar eclipse, we may see a period of great instability. Analysts also suggest that the influence of Adhika-masa (an extra lunar month) and the heavy movements of Saturn, especially when paired with Rahu, create a cycle of global confusion. Proponents of these views link the solar eclipse on August 12, 2026, to a time when world leaders will feel a false sense of overconfidence. They believe this celestial alignment will cause these leaders to make impulsive, reckless, and catastrophic decisions, which may speed up environmental and political shifts leading toward the year 2032.
- The Illusion of Two Suns: The text foretells the close approach of a massive celestial body or comet that will reflect sunlight in a manner that creates the visual appearance of two suns in the sky, remaining visible to the global population for a continuous period of 33 days.
- The Seven Days of Darkness: A major phase of the transition foretells seven continuous days and nights of absolute darkness across the Earth, caused by atmospheric dust or cosmic events, accompanied by severe tectonic activity, earthquakes, and the outbreak of 64 distinct global pandemics and epidemics.
- The Peak of the Conflict: The Malika texts state that the peak of this destructive global conflict will materialize during the late stages of this timeline, converting traditional geopolitical warfare into a severe nuclear and elemental crisis where the Pancha Bhoota (natural five elements) collapse simultaneously, purging the Earth's population down to a prophesied remnant of 64 crore (640 million) righteous individuals.

=== The 'Narendra' Prophecy ===
The text asserts that during this multi-year phase of global crisis, India will be governed by a specific leader referred to in the verses under the name Narendra (ନରେନ୍ଦ୍ର) which in Odia means "ruler of men" or "lord among men". The text describes this figure as a ruler who maintains the personal discipline, solitude, and lifestyle of an ascetic monk while actively managing state administration and military strategy.
