= Sabbath (disambiguation) =

Sabbath is a regular (usually weekly) time of rest, worship or special activity, observed by Abrahamic religions. Sabbath may also refer to:

== Religion ==
- Shabbat in Judaism
- Sabbath in Christianity
- Jumu'ah in Islam

== Art and entertainment ==
- The Witches' Sabbath or The Sabbath (1988), a drama film
- Sabbath (Doctor Who), a Doctor Who villain
- Mickey Sabbath, a character in Sabbath's Theater by Philip Roth
- Short for Black Sabbath, heavy metal band

== Other ==
- Witches' Sabbath

== See also ==
- Sabat (surname)
- Sabbat (disambiguation)
- Shabash (disambiguation)
- Shabat, a surname
- Shabtai (disambiguation)
