= Panchaka =

Hindu festival

Panchaka or Panchuka is an Odia hindu festival; the last five days of the month of Kartika are traditionally known as the Bhishma Panchaka or the Vaka Panchaka. According to the epic poem Jagamohana Ramayana, written by Balarama Dasa, it is said that if one is capable, one should fast from certain foods on the Bhishma Panchaka for the pleasure of the Vishnu. The Padma Purana say that one pleases Vishnu and makes spiritual advancement.

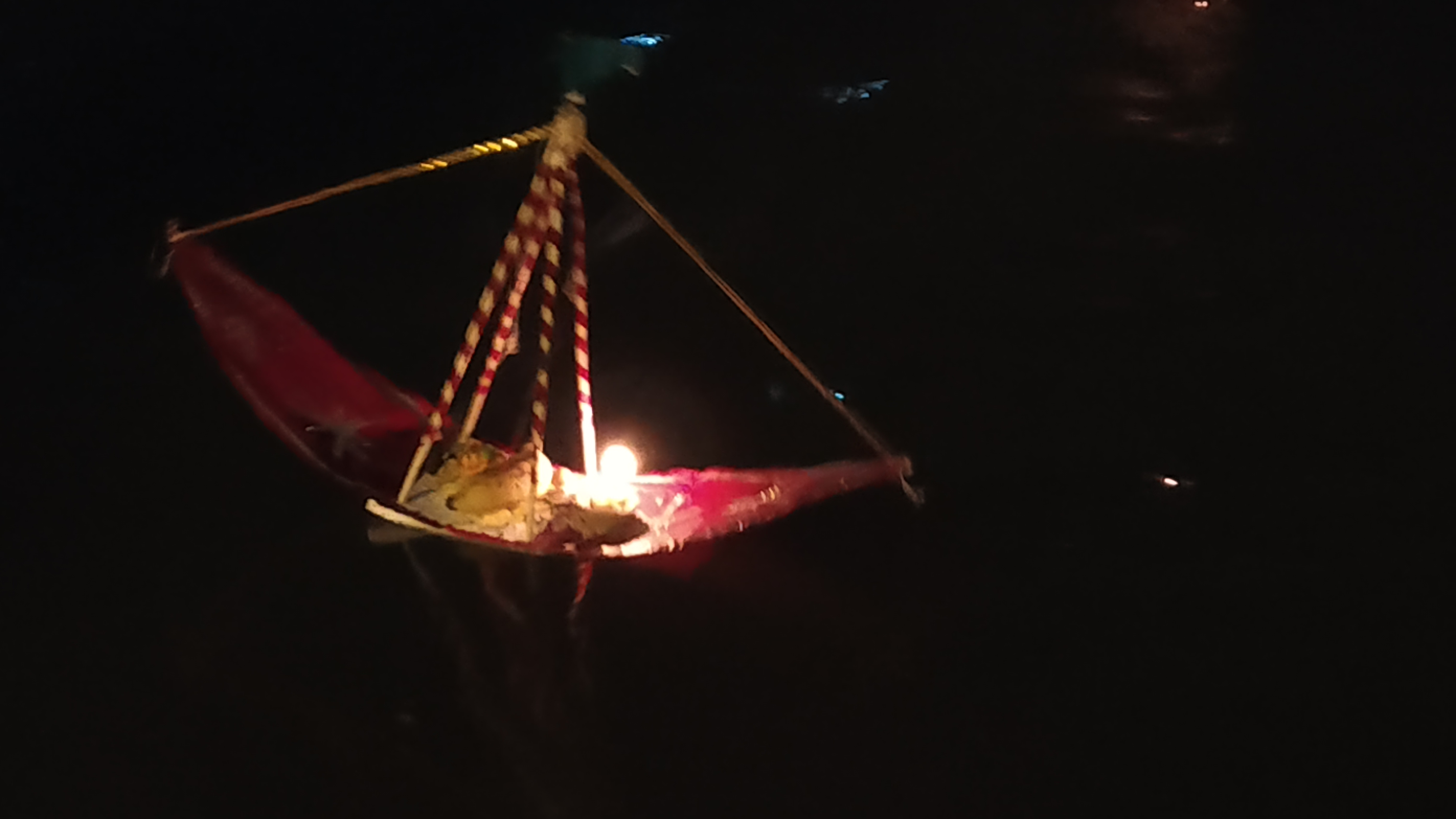
Monrning of Boita Bandana Purnima

== Observances ==
Devotees may offer the following offerings to lord Vishnu: lotus flowers, Bela leaves, sandalwood paste, jasmine flowers and malati flowers.

== Rituals in Jagannath Temple ==
The main temple at Puri becomes crowded as many people await various alankara of deities. Alankara like Dalakia vesha, Adakia Vesha, Laksmi Nrusingha Vesha, Trivikrama Vesha and finally on the day of Kartik Purnima, the lord is decorated in Rajarajeswara Vesha, which draws over 100,000 people. More prasad (food offerings) are made in the temple to cope with the demand from Havishya vratis (widows staying for the month-long Kartika vrata in Puri).
