= List of Odia films of the 1930s =

A list of films produced by the Ollywood film industry based in Bhubaneswar in the 1930s:

Title	Director	Cast	Genre	Notes
1936
Sita Bibaha	Mohan Sundar Deb Goswami	Makhanlal Bannerjee, Mohan Sunder Dev Goswami, Krishnachandra Singh	Mythological	First Oriya film
