= Szabat =

Szabat is a surname. Notable people with the surname include:

- Joel Szabat (fl. from 2005), American government official
- Przemysław Szabat (born 1985), Polish footballer

== See also ==
- Sabbat (disambiguation)
- Shabat, a name
