= Sabat (surname) =

Sabat is a surname. Notable people with the surname include:

- Martín Carrera Sabat (1806–1871), Mexican general and interim president
- Christopher Sabat (born 1973), American voice actor
- Hermenegildo Sábat (born 1933), Uruguayan-Argentine caricaturist
- Marc Sabat (born 1965), Canadian composer
- Ramon and Julia Sabat, owners of Panart Records
- Ali Hussain Sibat, Lebanese TV host
- Kuntala Kumari Sabat (1901–1938), Odia poet in colonial India
