= Dasakathia =

Performing folk art of Odisha, India

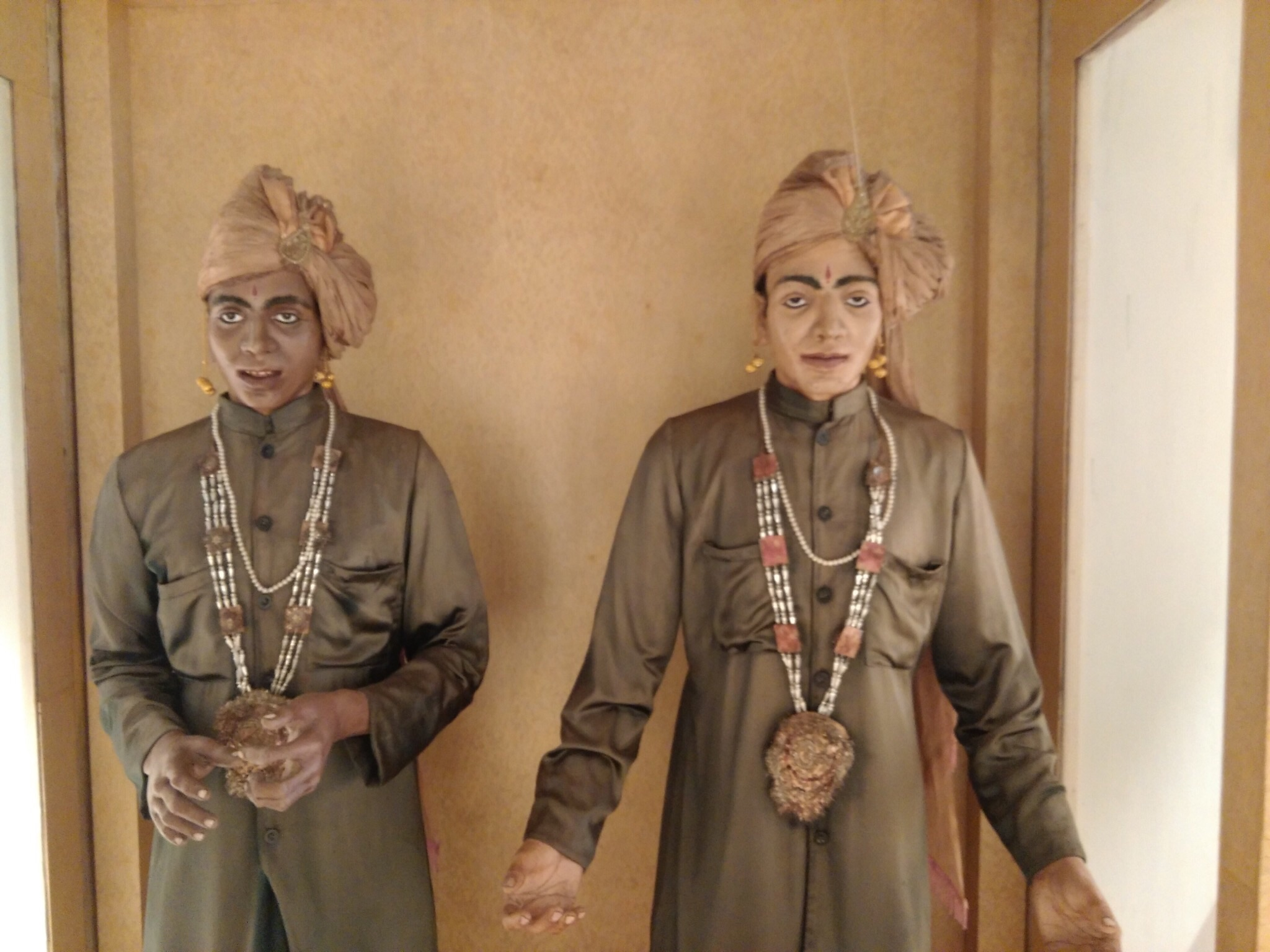
- Costumes worn by Dasakathia Performers
- Medium: Ballad singing
- Originating culture: Odia

Dasakathia is a traditional Odia folk art. It is a performing art widely performed by local or travelling performers within the state of Odisha.

It used to be one of the most important forms of entertainment in Odia culture. In the performance, the performers use a pair of wooden instruments one Ramtali (Held by Gayak) and other dasakathi (Held by the paliya) to create music. The performance is usually done by two person group. One person who leads is called Gahana/Gayaka and one performer follows, called Palia. The performance is usually a form of ballad singing. Gayakratna Baidyanath Sharma is one of the notable performers in recent times. The music used in Dasakathia is based on traditional Odissi music.

== Etymology ==
'Dasa' means devotee and 'Kathia' is an instrument used in the performance. In a Dasakathia performance the performers describe themselves as devotee of Lord Shiva and perform ballad singing routines.

== Origin ==
Dasakathia is thought to be originated from Khandara village from Ganjam district of Odisha.

== Performance ==
Dasakathia performances mainly tell mythological stories, primarily about Lord Shiva, but also other gods as well. Besides mythology, stories based on love, romance, elopement, deceit and marriage are used as subjects as well . One important aspect of the performance is satire and social message The performers play the Kathia, a percussion instrument made up of a pair of wooden pieces while singing and vocalizing. Recently government has used Dasakathia artists for many public service messages.

== Status ==
With the advent of other modes of entertainment Dasakathia has lost its popularity. However, with efforts of Government and Non government organisations efforts are being made to revive the art form.
