= Achyutananda Dasa =

16th-century Indian devotional poet

Mahapurusha Achyutananda Dasa
- ମହାପୁରୁଷ ଅଚ୍ୟୁତାନନ୍ଦ ଦାସ
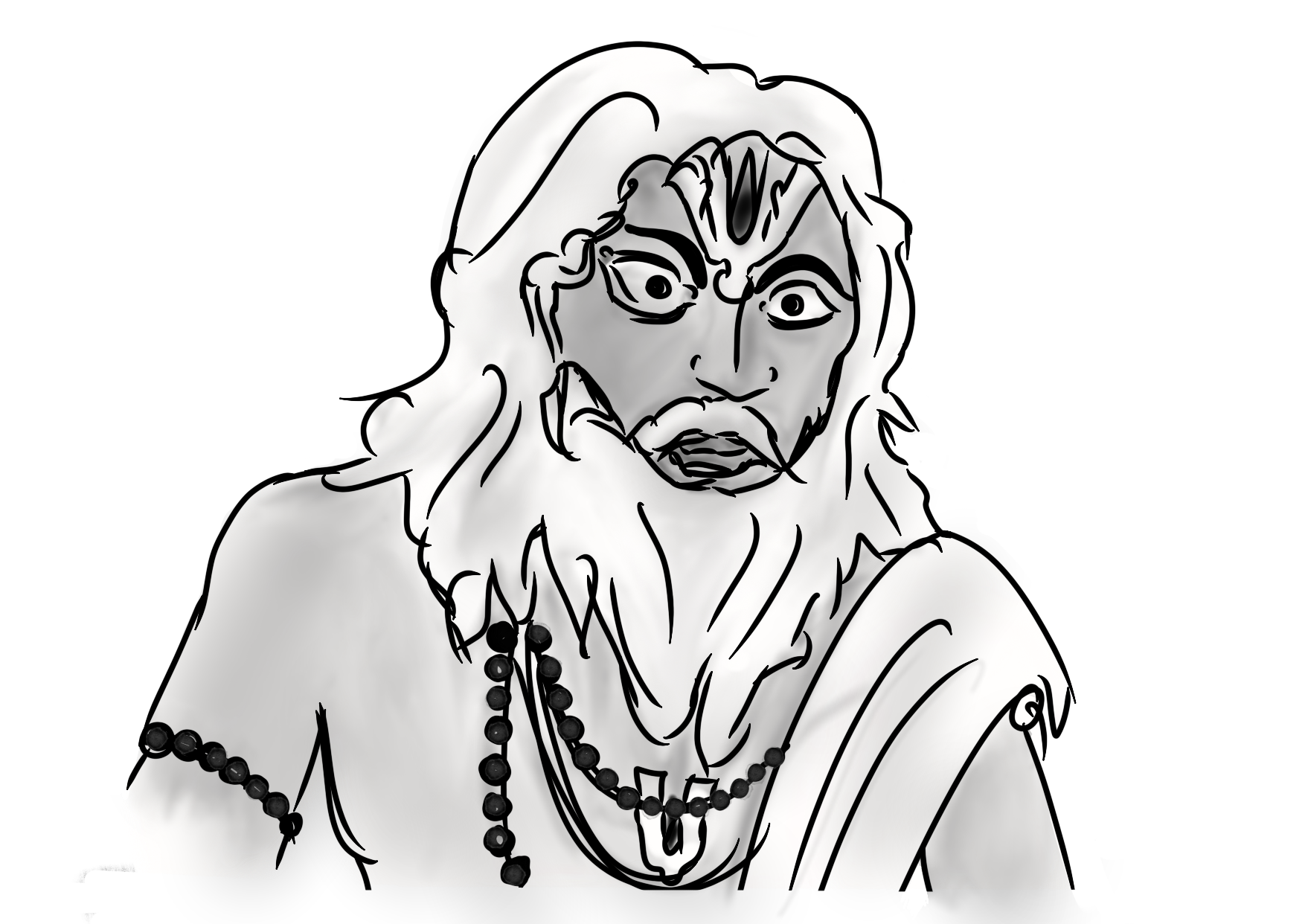
- Odia Saint Achyutananda Das
- Born: 10 January 1510; Tripura village, Cuttack, India
- Occupations: Saint - Scholar, Poet, Seer, Author, Polymath, Social - Religious Reformer, Philosopher, Founder of Utkaliya Baishanavism
- Writing career
- Language: Odia
- Notable works: Kaibarta Gita, Haribamsa, Sunya Samhita (Odiya) and many other

Mahapurusa Achyutananda Dasa was a 16th-century poet seer and Vaishnava saint from Odisha, India. He was considered to have the power to see the past, present and future. He was a prolific author, and one of the group of five, that led a revolution in spirituality in Odisha by translating Sanskrit texts into the Odia language for common people.

He was one of the famous five seers collectively called Panchasakha, named Ananta Dasa, Jagannatha Dasa, Balarama Dasa and Jasobanta Dasa who translated the ancient Hindu scriptures into Odia, for the people of Odisha. Achyutananda Dasa was the most prolific writer of the Panchasakha and wrote numerous books, many of which could be loosely translated as the Book of Prophecies. He is known as the Mahapurusa (a Great Person) for his vast knowledge on many subjects such as spirituality, Yoga, rituals, Yantra, Tantra, Ayurveda, and other various shastras. His major works include Harivamsa (in Oriya), Kaibarta Gita, Gopalanka-ogala, Gurubhakti Gita, Anakar-samhita, Chahayalisa-patala etc.

== Early life ==
As Achyutananda became a popular figure, much of his life began to become legend. He is famous for being one of the few who wrote about the social situation of his time and this is a scholarly reason many study his writings. His poetry was often cryptic about himself, and written in code or analogies. He took birth in a Karana family of village Tripura in Cuttack district, his father Dinabandhu Mohanty was in the service of king Prataparudra Deva of Gajapati Empire and had received the designation of "Khuntia" from Prataprudra Deva. His surname Dasa means servant of God. The Panchasakhas did not mention their caste to depict social stratification or status; rather, they used it to denote their religious and philosophical understanding of God. In his own writing, Achyutananda mentions that to humble the mind before God, one needs to identify with the lowest status and imbibe the “Shudra attitude.” This leads to complete surrender, which ultimately results in God realisation. Therefore, out of humility and deep bhakti (devotion) toward Lord Jagannath, he describes himself as a Shudra.

== Birth ==
Achyutananda Dasa's mother was Padmavati, and his father was Dinabandhu Mohanty who held the post of "Khuntia (Temple gatekeeper)" in Jagannath temple of Puri, and his grandfather was Gopinatha Mohanty, a scribe in the Jagannath Temple, Puri, his grandfather Gopinatha Mohanty was one of the private secretaries of King known by the name "Chamu Karana". Achyutananda Dasa while describing his lineage mentions that his father was a Karana attendant employed in Jagannath Temple, Puri while his grandfather was the royal scribe of the Gajapati Kings, however Achyutananda Dasa refuses to identify himself as a "Karana" despite taking birth in a Karana family as he refrained from following the customs and traditions of his family after becoming a Vaishnava. He took birth after his mother prayed at the pillar in front of the Jagannath Temple, and his father had a dream that the divine bird Garuda brought him a child. In legend he is believed to be an incarnation of Garuda. He left his samadhi at Nemalo village at Cuttack. His predecessors are Mahanta Gagananda Gosain, Mahanta Nigamananda Gosain and others.

=== Education ===
Achyutananda had a formal education in Puri. It is agreed by most texts that, like many contemporaries, he met Shri Chaitanya Mahaprabhu in his youth, and took mantra initiation from him. It is important to differentiate that he was an Utkaliya Vaishnava (ancient Odisha school of Vaishnavism, Jagannatha Temple tradition), not a Gaudiya Vaishnavism (which means Bengali Vaishnavism). He became the youngest of the Panchasakha.

== Panchasakha ==
Achyutānanda was part of the famous Panchasakha ('five friends'), who lived between 1450 and 1550 CE. The contemporaneous five saints – Achyutānanda Dasa, Sisu Ananta Dasa, Jasobanta Dasa, Jagannātha Dasa, and Balarāma Dasa - shaped Vaiṣṇava philosophy, spiritualism and literature of Odisha. The trio of Achyutananda Dasa, Balarama Dasa, and Ananta Dasa of the Panchasakha group came from the community of Karanas.

Two important factors set the Panchasakhas apart from other Indian Hindu Saints. They were the first to take the Hindu Sanskrit texts into the reach of the common people, by translating them into the local language (Odia). This was first done by Sāralā Dasa's translation of the Mahābhārata in the mid-15th century, followed by Balarama Dasa's Jagamohana Ramayana, Jagannath Dasa's Bhagavata Purana, and Achyutananda Dasa's Harivamsa. The second aspect is their form of Odia Vaiṣṇavism, traditionally called Utkaliya Vaishnavism, which sees God as the "Sunya Purusa" and the nature of the soul as being able to merge into the Absolute.

Some authors, such as N.N. Vasu, have depicted Odia Vaishnavism as 'Buddhist-Vaishnavism', since it does not accept Ramanuja's Viśiṣṭādvaita philosophy (11th century), nor does it adhere to orthodox Gaudiya Vaishnavism created in the 16th century Bengal. Other scholars, such as Prabhat Mukerjee, have denied these claims supporting the different varieties of Vaishnava philosophy. Scholars debate the influence of the Panchasakha from the original Vaishnava Agama (Pancharatras) while others source their ideas in Sahajayana Buddhism, and the Natha sampradaya. though the Panchasakhas saw Jagannatha as an incarnation of Vishnu as seen in the Dasāvatara image on the main mantel of the Jagannatha Temple.

== Utkaliya Vaishnavism ==
Utkaliya Vaishnavism (sometimes called Odia Vaishnavism in modern literature) developed into its present state, in the 15th century. According to the Panchasakhas, Lord Jagannath is the "Purna-Brahma", and all the avatars of Vishnu emanate from Him, and also enter into Him at the end. Jagannatha was the chief god of the devotional sect. The chief ideal of the Panchasakhas was that as a bhakta they would be faithful, humble, learned, selfless, active, benevolent and affectionate. The Panchasakhas were against the caste system; they considered all beings as one. They translated the Sanskrit Classics into local language Odia. Anyone could become a Vaishnava .

At the time of Shri Chaitanya, his followers who came from Nadia, called later as Gaudiya, considered themselves greater or superior to the Utkaliya Vaishnavas and disregarded them. So there was a cold war between them. Because of the animosity between the sects, Shri Chaitanya conferred the title of 'Atibadi' (the greatest one) on Jagannatha Dasa. The conflict of these two groups is evident in the Barana Charita Gita of Achyutananda and Jagannatha Charitamruta of Dibakara Dasa, and even in modern-day derogatory language of the Gaudiya Vaishnavas towards the Utkaliya Vaishnavas.

== Philosophical ideology of Achyutananda ==
=== Sunya Purusa ===
nāhi tāhāra rūpa varṇa, adṛsha avarṇa tā cinha.
tāhāku brahmā boli kahi, śūnya brahmhati se bolāi.

It has no shape, no colour,
It is invisible and without a name
This Brahman is called Sunya Brahman.

Achyutananda (and the other four saints) believed in a concept of God (Vishnu) as Sunya (emptiness, void, zero) called Sunya Purusa and/or Sunya Brahman. This sunya signifies a transcendental principle that eludes the conceptual nexus applied to human thinking as described in the Upanishads. Achyutananda's culminating work is called the Sunya Samhita where he discusses this philosophy in depth.

śūnyara ākāra viira śūnyara vicāra, śūnye thāi dekha vīra e sacarācara.
dekha e sacarācara śūnyare prakāsha, śūnyu ude hoicanti śūnyare vilāse.

Oh vira look at the sunya
By placing yourself in sunya,
And meditate on mahasunya,
Sunya itself is the form,
Ground of all discriminating knowledge.
Look at the whole world from the pedestal of sunya;
You will find everything manifested in the sunya,
Everything arises out of sunya and
Everything flourishes in the Sunya Brahman.

The philosophy sees Sunya as being full or whole (purna), and this view of Brahman is sometimes called the Purna Sunya (the full/complete void). The Panchasakhas project the deity Jagannatha as the embodiment of the Sunya Purusa. Achyutananda uses a classical (pre-Ramanuja) concept of Vaishnavism that uses both form, and formless aspects of god. This is seen in his statement from the Gurubhakti Gita :

dui je deṇāre pakṣī uḍikari jāi, dui je cakṣure sehi saṃsāre khelai.
eka je na thile kaṇā dui gale anḍha, eṇukari nirguṇa saguṇa sehi bheda.

A bird can only fly with both wings. It can have a perfect vision with both the eyes.
In the absence of one, it becomes one-eyed, and in the absence of both, it is totally blind.
Thus like two eyes Nirguna [god perceived as formless]and Saguna [god perceived with form] are chained together.

=== Jnana-mishra bhakti-marga ===
The Panchasakhas were Vaishnavas by thought. But they differed from Chaitanya's path of devotion and preached Jnana-mishra bhakti or Devotion with mix of Wisdom. Chaitanya's path of devotion was known as Raganuga Bhakti Marga (brought to Odisha in 1509), which says all one needs is love (devotion) to reach God. The Panchasakhas believed that one needs a combination of love (bhakti) and wisdom (Jnana) to reach God. With one's knowledge, if one shows one's pure love (bhakti), one can definitely reach the Sunyatma. The Panchasakhas therefore promoted a Vaishnavism that involved study of scriptures, yoga, rituals, and devotion.

=== Pinda-Brahmanda Tattwa ===
The concept of the Piṇḍa-Brahmāṇḍa is that the body (Piṇḍa) is a replica of the Universe (Brahmāṇḍa), or microcosm is a reflection of the macrocosm. Many of the yogic teachings of Achyutananda are based on this core concept. His teachings are filled with references to outer locations existing as energies in the body.

=== Sabda Brahman ===
The concept of the Sabda Brahman is that God created the universe as sound, and that all things have sound vibration as their essence. The writings of Achyutananda are filled with mantras and esoteric concepts about sounds and their effects on consciousness. For example, in Achyutananda's Rama Rasa Boli, the demon Ravanna is said to have meditated on the sound "Sleem" while focusing on the ten other sacred sounds (yoga-dasakhyara) to please Goddess Sita. Even more esoteric is this verse from the Sunya Rahasa where one can see the interwoven nature of internal yogic theory and sound found in Achyutananda's writings:

Oh Jnanins: utter the name of Hari [God]
May be you are the eldest or the youngest.
Piercing six chakras blooms the lotus
Near the ethereal void of air
Between the Sutala and Rasatala
The bee abides at the zenith of the void
One is not a servant of the Lord just because they have a rosary
Unless he utters the name of Krisna in his inner heart;
The Name is the seed, rosary its robe
Rosary is of no use if God's name is mindlessly uttered
The three cords are the three triadic streams
Make your oblations there
Ayudhya, Dwarika, and the city of Gopa
This knowledge is memorised by every soul.

=== Author of Bhavishya Malika ===
Achyutananda Dasa, has written many scriptures. These sacred texts comprise 36 Samhitas, 72 Gitas, 27 Genealogies, and 100 scriptures known as 'Bhavishya Malika'. Bhavishya Malika is said to contain predictions that indicate the condition of the Kaliyug and events that would occur by the end of Kaliyug.

=== Social reformer ===
Achyutananda Dasa, despite taking birth in a noble Karana family of his time, used to associate with communities like Keutas (Fishermen) and Gaudas (Cowherds) and wrote treatises for their communities to uplift their social status in Odia society, Acyutananda Dasa is also regarded by the above communities as their patron saint in Odisha.

== See also ==
- List of Indian poets

== Notes ==
- Chaini, Ratnakar. Achyutananda Das. Sahitya Akademi, Calcutta, 1998.
- Mansingha, Mayadhar. History of Oriya literature. Sahitya Akademi, New Delhi,1962.
- Patnaik, Tandra. Sunya Purusa. Utkal Studies in Philosophy XII. Utkal University, Bubhaneswar in association with D.K. Printworld (P) Ltd., New Delhi, 2005.
- Mishra, Ramprasad. Sahajayana: A Study of Tantric Buddhism. Punthi Pustak, Calcutta, 1991.
- Mukherjee, Prabhat. History of Medieval Vaishnavism in Orissa. Asian Educational Services, New Delhi, 1981.
- Sri Sri Mahapurusa Siddha Ashram. Glimpse of a Yogi; Sri Sri Mahapurusa Achyutananda Das. Sri Sri Mahapurusa Achyutananda Trust, Sri Ram Nagar, Puri, Odisha, India, 1998.
- The History of Orissa: An Introduction from Pages from the history of India and the sub-continent (South Asian History) a non-commercial web project
- Das, Alekh Prasad. Jibanara Daka; an autobiography, 1994; published by Sri Lalita Prakasani, Bhubaneswar. Won Odisha Sahitya Academy Award for autobiography in 2000.
- http://www.sai.uni-heidelberg.de/abt/IND/publikation/biborissa/biborissa.htm :The library of the South Asian Institute (SAI), University of Heidelberg, has some references and recollections of the original works of Sri Achyutananda Das. An "Orissan Project" was undertaken some decades ago, funded by the German Research Council, as a part of the studies of the South Asian cultures. A number of references can be found in this library.
