= Shabat =

Shabat is a surname. Notable people with the surname include:

- Asael Ben Shabat (born 1988), Israeli footballer
- Alexey Shabat (1937–2020), Soviet mathematician
- Boris Shabat (1917–1987), Soviet mathematician
- George Shabat (b. 1952), Soviet mathematician after whom the Shabat polynomial is named
- Hossam Shabat (2001–2025), Palestinian journalist
- Shlomi Shabat (born 1954), Israeli vocalist

Shabat is also the name of a city in Turkmenistan:

- Shabat, Turkmenistan

== See also ==
- Sabbat (disambiguation)
- Szabat
- Šabaṭ, the first month of the Mandaean calendar
