= Shun'ya =

- Gender: Male

Origin
- Origin: Japanese
- Meaning: Different meanings depending on the kanji used

Shun'ya or Shunya (written: 俊也, 駿也, 隼也, 峻野, 駿冶 or 駿哉) is a masculine Japanese given name. Notable people with the name include:

- Shunya Itō (伊藤 俊也; born 1937), Japanese film director
- Shunya Mori (毛利 駿也; born 1995), Japanese footballer
- Shunya Shiraishi (白石 隼也; born 1990), Japanese actor
- Shunya Suganuma (菅沼 駿哉; born 1990), Japanese footballer
- Shunya Takayama (高山 峻野; born 1994), Japanese hurdler
- Shunya Yoneda (米田 隼也; born 1995), Japanese footballer

== See also ==
- Śūnyatā
