= Jasobanta Dasa =

Odia poet and philosopher (born 1487)

Mahapurusha Jasobanta Dasa
- ଯଶୋବନ୍ତ ଦାସ
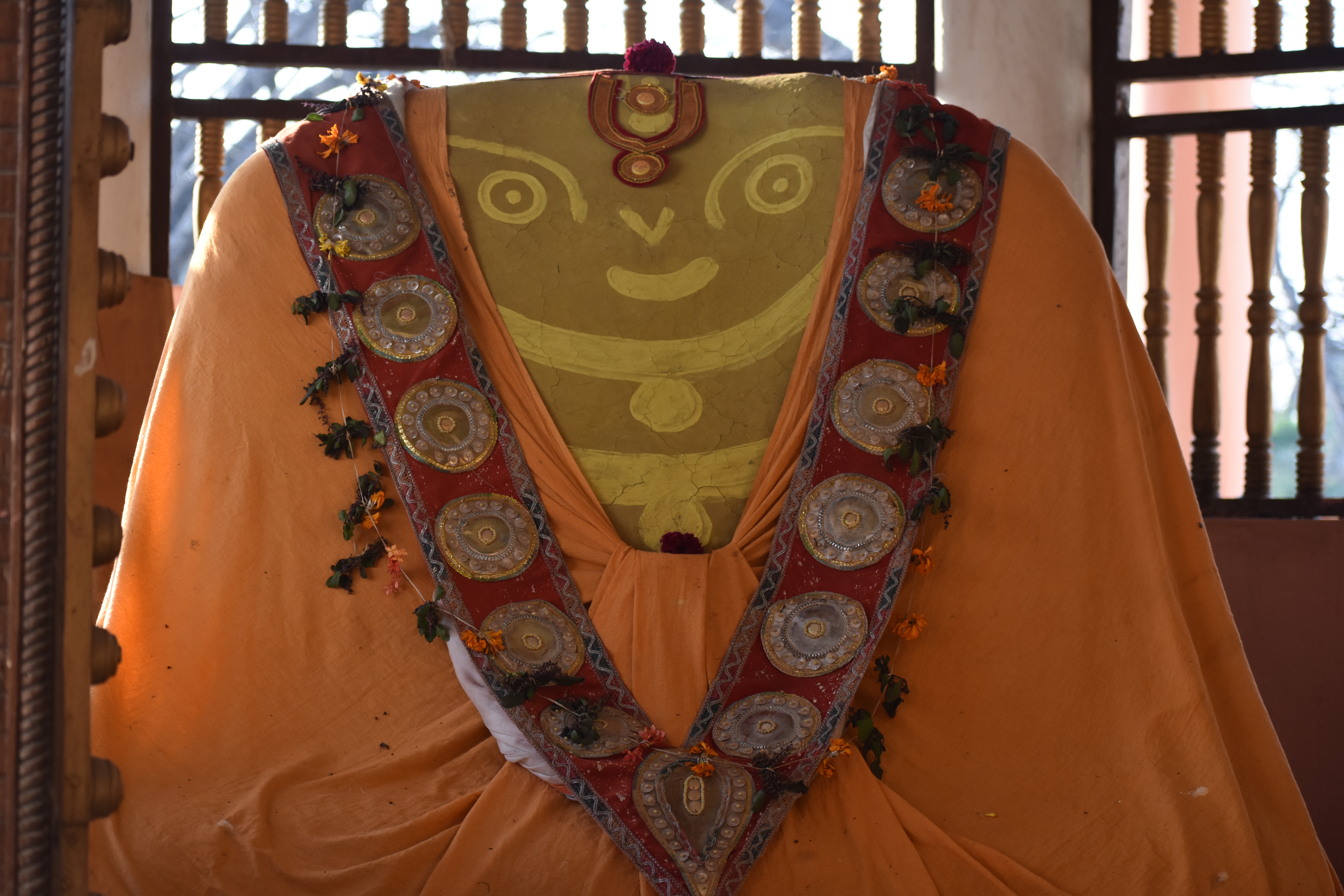
- Gadi of Mahapurusa Jasobanta Dasa
- Born: 1487; Adhanga, Jagatsinghpur, Odisha
- Occupation: Poet
- Spouse: Anjana Devi
- Writing career
- Language: Odia
- Period: Bhakti age
- Genres: Poetry, Ballads
- Subjects: Mythology, Philosophy
- Notable works: Gobindachandra Tika, Prema Bhakti Brahma Gita

Mahapurusa Jasobanta Dasa (Odia: [d͡ʒɔsobɔnt̪ɔ d̪aːsɔ]; born c. 1487) was an Odia poet, litterateur and mystic, best known as the author of the treatise Premabhakti Brahmagita. He was one of the five great poets in Odia literature, the Panchasakha named Ananta Dasa, Jagannatha Dasa, Balarama Dasa and Achyutananda Dasa during the Bhakti age of literature.

== Early life ==
Early life of Jasobanta is mainly sourced from the work Jasobanta Dasanka Chaurashi Agyan (Eighty-four arts of Jasobanta Dasa) by one of his disciples Sudarshan Das. He was born at village Nandigrama of Adhangagarh, Jagatsinghpur, part of undivided Cuttack District in a Khandayat kshatriya family. His father's name was Ballabhadra Mahanayak and his mother's name was Rekha Devi. He wed Anjana Devi, the sister of Adhangagarh’s king Raghunath Champattiray. He later took sannyasa and travelled to numerous holy places throughout India, where he attained mystic powers and gained the ability to change his form at will. He chanted and taught the Shyama mula mantra.

Govinda chandra, Shiva sarodaya, Sasti mala, Prema bhakti, Brahma gita, Atma pariche gita, a Malika, and several bhajans were among his works. Govinda chandra became extremely popular in Assam, Bengal, and northern India; it is primarily associated with traditional dance and dance instruction, both of which are associated with the Vaishnava tradition. Lohi Das was his most devoted disciple. He dismembered himself on Margasira sukla Sasti.

== Literary works ==
A list of his known works is as below.

- Gobinda Chandra
- Prema Bhakti Brahma Gita
- Siba Swarodaya
- Bhavishya Maalika (being one of the Panchasakhas)
