= Jagamohana Ramayana =

Odia epic poem

- Author(s): Balarama Dasa
- Patron: Prataparudra Deva
- Dedicated to: Jagannath
- Language: Middle Odia
- Date: 15th century
- Genre: Mythology
- Subject: Ramayana
- Personages: Rama, Sita, Lakshmana, Hanuman, Ravana

The Jagamohana Ramayana (Odia: ଜଗମୋହନ ରାମାୟଣ, romanized: Jagamōhana Rāmāyaṇa, Sanskrit: जगमोहन रामायण, romanized: Jagamōhana Rāmāyaṇa) also known as the Dandi Ramayana (Odia: ଦାଣ୍ଡି ରାମାୟଣ, romanized: Dāṇḍi Rāmāyaṇa) popularly across Odisha is an epic poem composed by the 15th-century poet Balarama Dasa. This work is a retelling of the Ramayana, though not a direct translation.

== Synopsis ==
The story of this version is presented as a narration by Shiva to Parvati. The plot moves as a form of dialogue between the two. The story begins with Sati and how Shiva is reunited with Sati in the form of Parvati. After being reunited with the goddess, Shiva narrates the story of Rama to Parvati. The plot of the Ramayana begins with Dasharatha's efforts to get a son by holding a yajña. The central plot of the Sanskrit Ramayana is followed in the text, with some significant departures in the plot and the characters, influenced by local tradition.

One of the biggest differences between the Sanskrit original and Odia version is evident from the ending itself, where Sita resides happily in Ayodhya with the entire royal family and is never sent into exile, in contrast to the Sanskrit original.

According to the author, Rama is Jagannatha or Vishnu himself, Sita is Lakshmi, and his brothers are partial incarnations of Vishnu. The gods scheme to have Rama exiled from his kingdom following his wedding so that he would fulfil his destiny of slaying Ravana, sending the heroes Khala, Durbala, and Saraswati to influence Kaikeyi's hostility towards Rama. Shiva is regarded to have achieved liberation by chanting the name of Rama. Jagannatha himself is attributed as the author of the work according to Balarama Dasa, who calls himself the scribe. In his chapters, the author employs versions of the legend from the Puranas, kavyas, distinctive Odia legends, southern and northern folk traditions, and natakas.

== Structure ==
The work is written in a meter called Dandi Vritta. It is a 14-letter meter suitable for narrative style. It is a lengthy work. The epic follows the seven cantos of the original Sanskrit Ramayana. They are:

- Adi Kanda - ଆଦି କାଣ୍ଡ
- Ayodhya Kanda - ଅଯୋଧ୍ଯା କାଣ୍ଡ
- Vana Kanda - ବନ କାଣ୍ଡ
- Kishkindha Kanda - କିସ୍କିନ୍ଧା କାଣ୍ଡ
- Sundara Kanda - ସୁନ୍ଦର କାଣ୍ଡ
- Yuddha Kanda - ଯୁଦ୍ଧ କାଣ୍ଡ
- Uttara Kanda - ଉତ୍ତରା କାଣ୍ଡ

== Cultural aspects ==
This work brought the tale of Ramayana to the Odia-speaking region, and it became quite popular. It faced significant opposition from the Sanskrit proponents and opponents of Odia literature. It is heavily influenced by the Jagannath culture. In multiple places, the writer says that the writing is carried out by Jagannath himself. The book also enlightens some significant aspects of contemporary lifestyle. There are descriptions of pregnancy, customs and rituals followed during pregnancy, etc. There are descriptions of cultural practices that follow the birth of a child. There are descriptions of the natural beauty of Odisha, living standards, foods, locations, etc. It also contains references to the popular Indian foods at the time, such as puri, malpua, laddu, and rasagola.

== Derivative works ==
There were multiple books written that summarised the Jagamohana Ramayana called Ṭikā Rāmāyaṇa. There were several of these abridged versions. One such work by Maheswara Dasa was just forty printed pages.

In southern Odisha, the original Odia Ramayana circulated with new material being added over the years. This eventually grew to a massive volume of 3000 pages. This version is known as Dakṣiṇī Rāmāyaṇa.

== See also ==
- Jagamohan Ramayana in Devanagari script
- Typical Selections from Oriya Literature, B C Mazumdaar, 1918
