= Sabbat (disambiguation) =

A sabbat is a Wiccan festival.

Sabbat may also refer to:

- Witches' Sabbath or Sabbat, a gathering of those considered to practice witchcraft and other rites
- Sabbat (English band), a thrash metal band formed in the 1980s
- Sabbat (Japanese band), a black metal band formed in the 1980s
- Sabbat the Necromagus, a fictional character in Judge Dredd
- The Sabbat, a fictional sect in the tabletop game Vampire: The Masquerade
  - Sabbat: The Black Hand, a game book about the sect
  - Sabbat, an expansion for the related card game Vampire: The Eternal Struggle
- Kazimierz Sabbat (1913–1989), former president and prime minister of Poland-in-exile

== See also ==
- Sabbath (disambiguation)
