= Ananta Dasa =

15th century saint-poet from Odisha

Sisu Ananta Dasa
- ଶିଶୁ ଅନନ୍ତ ଦାସ
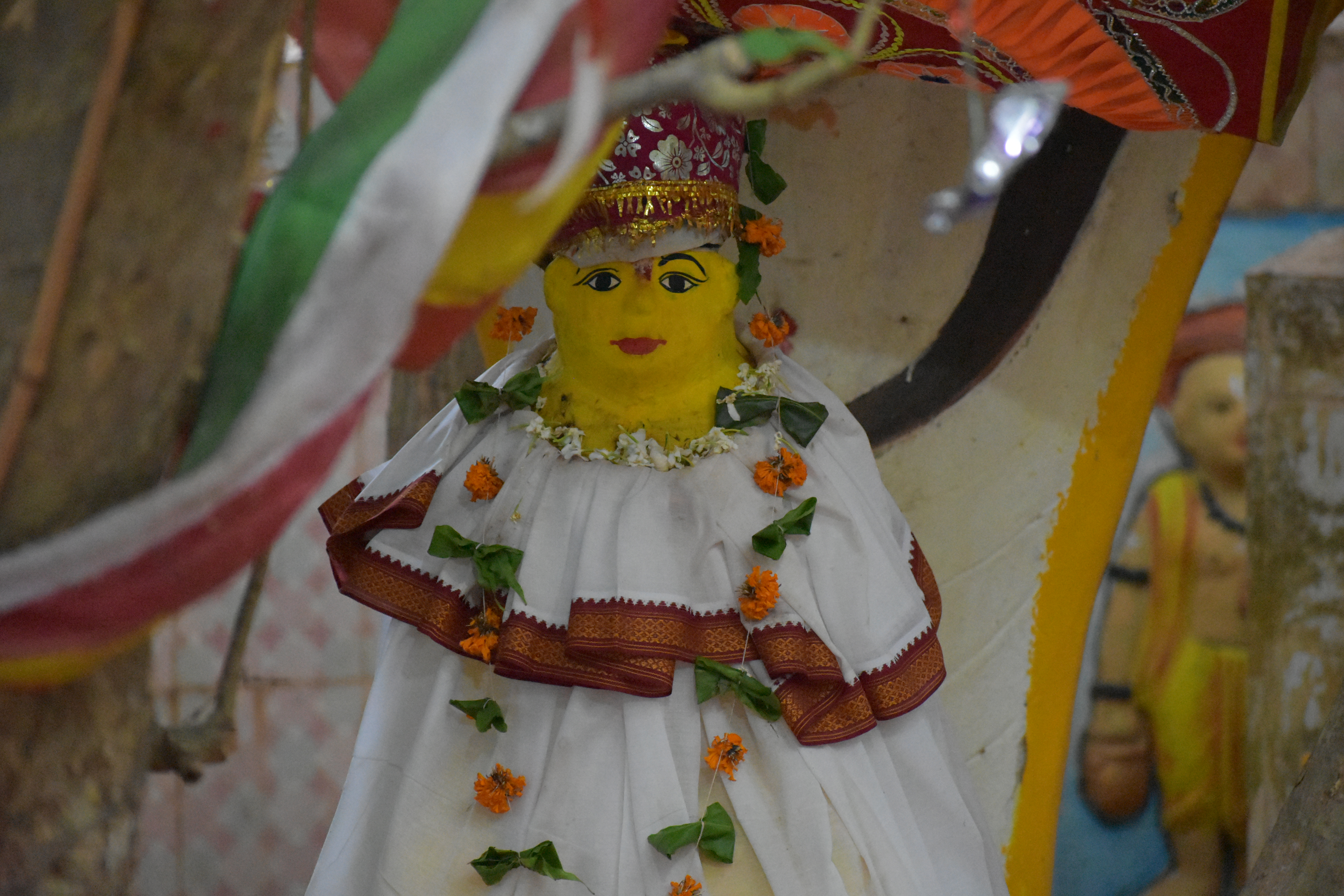
- Born: c. 1475; Balipatana, Khordha district, Odisha
- Occupations: Seer, poet
- Writing career
- Language: Odia
- Genres: Mythology, Ballads
- Notable work: Hetu Udaya Bhagabata

Sisu Ananta Dasa (also spelled Ananta Dasa; Odia: [sisu ɔnɔnt̪ɔ d̪aːsɔ]; born c. 1475) was an Odia poet, litterateur and mystic. He was one of the five great poets in Odia literature, the Panchasakha named Sri Jasobanta Dasa, Sri Jagannatha Dasa, Sri Balarama Dasa and Sri Achyutananda Dasa during the Bhakti age of literature. He is known for his work Hetu Udaya Bhagabata.

== Personal life ==
Not much is known about his early life. Some of the later writers have mentioned his parentage. Ananta was born Ananta Mohanty in Balipatana village, his father's name was Kapila Mohanty who had received the title "Mahapatra" and belonged to Karan community. He was one of the chief saints of Utkaliya Utkal Vaishnavism and propagator of the Sisu sampradaya.

== Literary works ==
His magnum opus was Hetu Udaya Bhāgabata. A list of his known works is as below.

- Chumbaka Malikā
- Nilagiri Charita
- Hetu Udaya Bhāgabata
- Artha Tāreni Prasnottara
- Anākāra Samhitā
- Bhaktimuktipradāyaka Gita
