= Jagannatha Dasa (Odia poet) =

Odia poet and litterateur

Atibadi Jagannatha Dasa
- ଅତିବଡ଼ି ଜଗନ୍ନାଥ ଦାସ
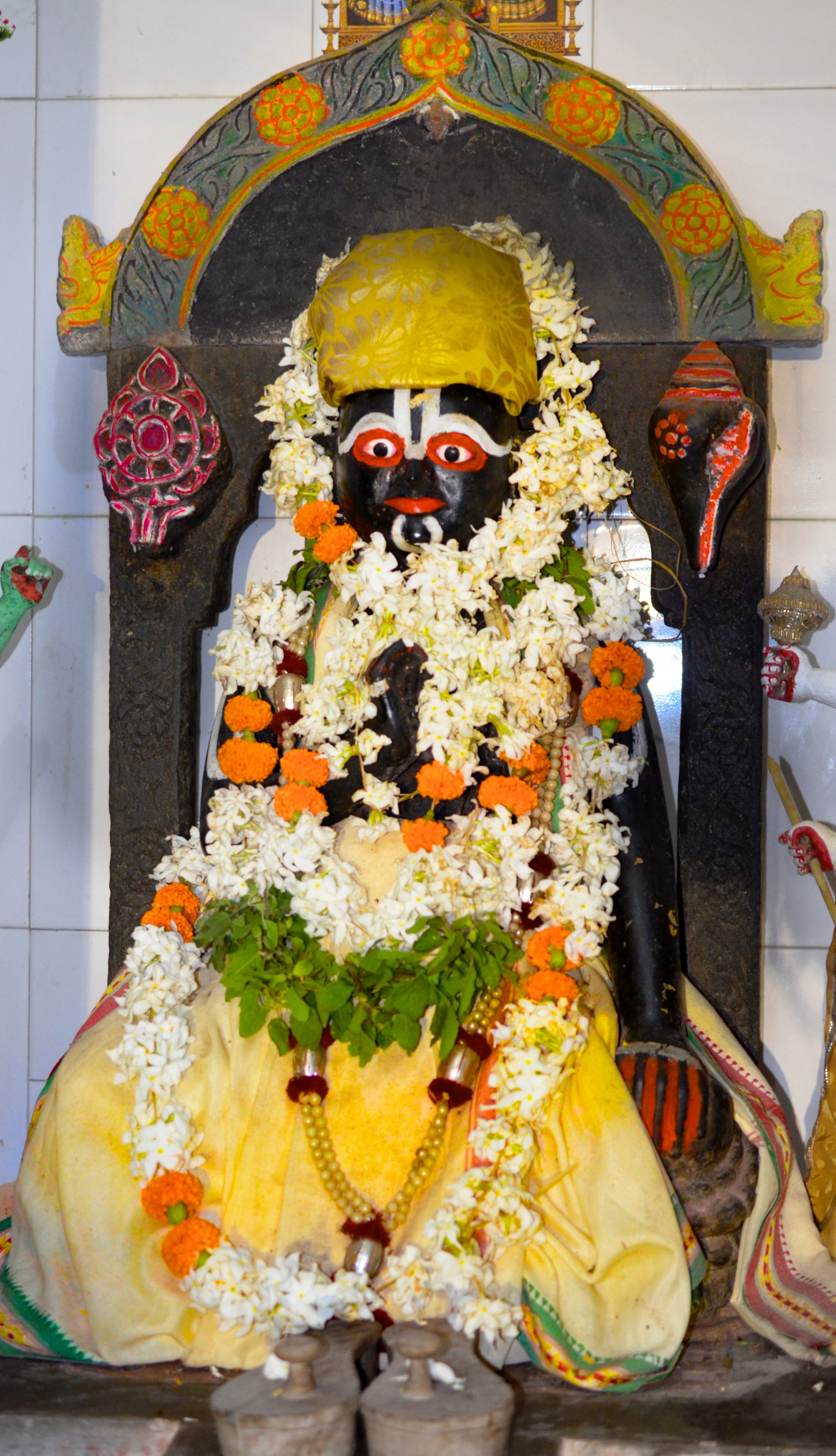
- Ancient idol of Jagannatha Dasa in Puri's Bada Odia Matha, which Jagannatha himself established
- Born: 19 October 1490; Kapileswarpur, Puri, India
- Died: 1550 (aged 59–60)
- Occupations: Poet, seer
- Writing career
- Language: Odia
- Notable work: Odia Bhagavata Purana

Jagannatha Dasa (c. 1490–1550), known by the honorific Atibadi, meaning "very great" (Odia: ଅତିବଡ଼ୀ ଜଗନ୍ନାଥ ଦାସ, romanized: Atibaḍī Jagannātha Dāsa, Odia: [ɔt̪ibɔɽi d͡ʒɔɡɔnnaːt̪ʰɔ d̪aːsɔ]), was a medieval Odia poet and mystic, best known as the composer of the Odia Bhagabata (an Odia-language version of the Bhagavata Purana). He was one of the five great poets (along with Ananta Dasa, Jasobanta Dasa, Balarama Dasa and Achyutananda Dasa) in Odia literature, known as the Panchasakha ("five friends").

== Early life ==
Dasa was born in Kapileswarpur Sasana (one of the 16 traditional Sasana villages in Puri) on Radhastami in 1490, in an established Brahmin family of the kauśika gotra. His mother was Padmabati Debi and his father was Bhagabana Dasa.

His father was a speaker of the Bhagabata in Utkala. Pleased with Bhagabana Dasa's elucidation of the Purana, Purushottama Deva, the then reigning king of Utkala, gave him the title "Purana Panda". He trained Jagannatha to follow him as a Purana Panda. Jagannatha Dasa was almost the same age as Chaitanya Mahaprabhu. Soon after their chance meeting under the Kalpa Bata tree, a spiritual kinship grew between the two that developed into a warm, lifelong friendship. Chaitanya was an avid admirer of Dasa and called him "Atibadi."

== Literary works ==
Dasa wrote the Odia Bhagabata. It had a great influence in the standardizing of the Odia language. Its popularity in Odisha reached to the level of it being worshiped in many homes. The villages in Odisha used to have a small house or room known as the bhagabata tungi, where villagers would gather to listen to recitations of Dasa's Bhagabata. Many of its verses have become proverbs and are cited by people throughout Odisha.

The work includes 12 volumes and each volume has 10–30 chapters. Each chapter has 50 to 300 stanzas.

The Odia Bhagabata has been translated into English. The English translation is Readings from Bhagabata.

Jagannath Dasa has also contributed for the Bhavishya Malika as well being one of the Panchsakhas.

== See also ==
- List of Indian poets
