= Kuntala Kumari Sabat =

Indian Odia poet

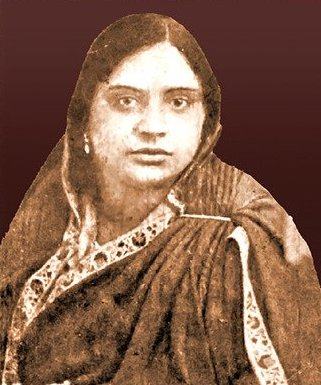
- Kuntala Kumari Sabat
- Born: 8 February 1901; Jagadalpur, Bastar State, Central Provinces, British Raj
- Died: 23 August 1938 (aged 37)
- Occupations: Physician, poet
- Writing career
- Language: Odia

Signature
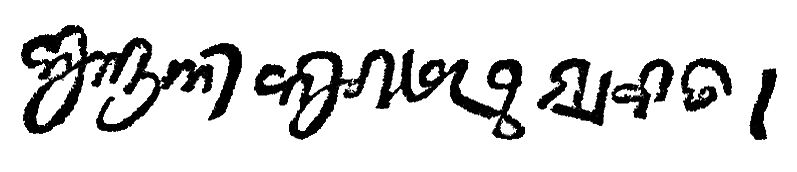

Kuntala Kumari Sabat (1901–1938) was an Odia poet during colonial India. She was one of the women poets who came into prominence from Odisha during India's freedom struggle. She was multifaceted personality. She was a physician, writer, poet, editor, leader of nationalist movement and social worker. She was honored with Utkala Bharati in 1925.She had a one son named Jagmohan Das. Grandson name Rudramohan Das and Chidananda Das.

== Early life ==
Kuntala Kumari Sabat was born on February 8, 1901, at Jagadalpur in erstwhile capital city of the princely state of Bastar,(now in Chhattisgarh). Her father Daniel Sabat was a physician. Her mother's name was Monika Sabat. Her maternal grandfather was from Dandamukundapur, Puri. Her father moved to Bastar and converted to Christianity before her birth. Soon after her birth she moved to Burma with her family.

She spent her early childhood in Burma. Her father remarried while at Burma and Kuntala returned to Odisha with her Mother. She settled in Khordha with her mother after returning from Burma. In spite of total lack of women's education her mother's perseverance allowed her to receive a good education. She studied from Ravenshaw Girls High School and continued her education in Orissa Medical School, Cuttack (Now Srirama Chandra Bhanja Medical College and Hospital). She earned her L.M.P (Licentiate Medical Practitioners) degree in 1921 with a gold medal. She was fluent in Odia, Hindi, Bengali, English and Burmese.She had a one son named Jagmohan Das. Grandson name Rudramohan Das and Chidananda Das. Rudramohan has two daughters Subhamayi Subhashree Das and Debashree Das,and Chidananda has one son Chandrakanta Das..

== Professional life ==
After getting her physician degree, she joined the practice under the guardianship of Dr Kailash Chandra Rao. She was in the medical practice from 1921 to 1928. After that she started her own practice at Cuttack. She started Women's Welfare Center of the Red Cross Society at Cuttack in 1925. She moved to New Delhi in 1928. The same year she married her mentor Krishna Prasad Brahmachari.

== Public life ==
She worked to eradicate the caste discrimination. She wrote against child marriage, discrimination against women and Purdah. She worked for widow remarriage, women's emancipation. She was one of the key figures from Odisha in the Indian freedom Struggle. She wrote primarily is Odia. However she wrote in Hindi as well. She edited several magazines such as Mahavir, Jivana, Nari Bharati. She was invited to speak at convocation ceremony of Benaras Hindu University and Allahabad University. She established an organisation called Bharati Tapovan Sangha that worked towards development of Odia language. Kuntala Kumari's literary work and her role in the public life were many times comparable to those of Sarojini Naidu.

== Published works ==
- Sabata, Kuntala Kumari (1924). Uchvasa (in Odia). OCLC 1046986353.
- Sphulinga, 1927
- Archana, 1927
- Sabata, Kuntala Kumari (1936). Odianka kandana (in Odia). OCLC 1046986123.
- Bhranti
- Prema Cintamani, 1931
- Anjali
- Kali Bohu
- Sabata, Kuntala Kumari; Das, Kunjabihari (1968). Utkala Bharati Kuntala Kumari granthamala (in Odia). Kataka shtudents shtora. OCLC 30883708.
- Sabata, Kuntala Kumari; Dasa, Hemanta Kumara (2004). Kuntalakumari granthabali : kabyakhanda (in Odia and Hindi). Praci Sahitya Pratishthana. OCLC 124032043.
