= Balarama Dasa =

Odia poet

Krupasiddha Matta Balarama Dasa
- ବଳରାମ ଦାସ
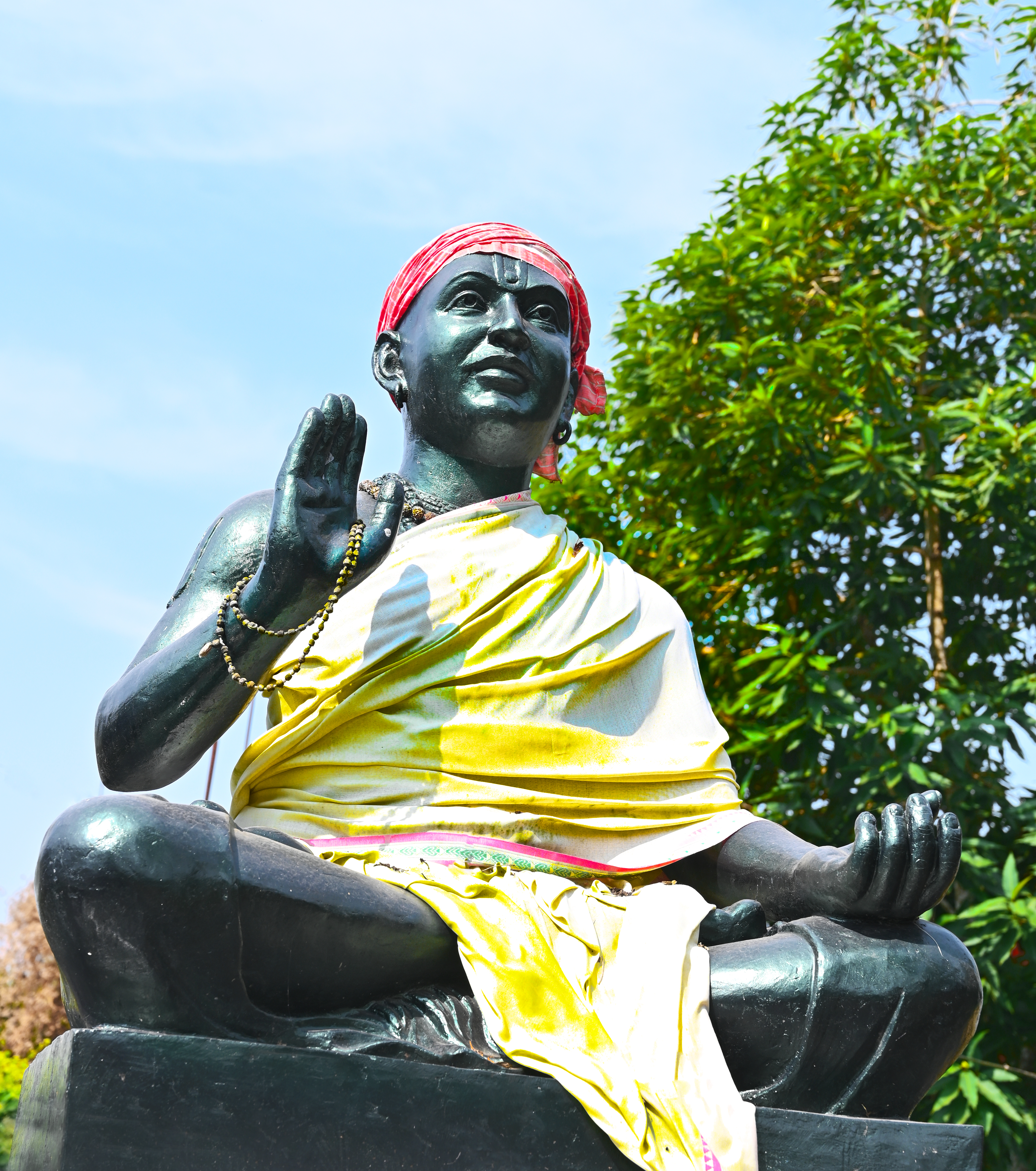
- Statue of Balarama Dasa at Erabanga, his native place
- Born: c. 1472; Puri
- Died: c. 1556
- Occupations: Poet, Saint
- Writing career
- Language: Odia
- Genres: Puranas, spiritual history, philosophy, yoga Odissi music
- Notable works: Jagamohana Ramayana, Lakshmi Purana

Krupasiddha Balarama Dasa (alternatively spelled Balaram Das; Odia: [bɔl̪ɔraːmɔ d̪aːsɔ]; c. 1474-1522) was a mystic seer-poet who wrote in Odia, best known as the author of the voluminous Jagamohana Ramayana or Dandi Ramayana. He was one of the five great poets in Odia literature, the 'Panchasakhā' named Ananta Dasa, Jagannatha Dasa, Jasobanta Dasa and Achyutananda Dasa during the Bhakti age of literature. He was the eldest of the five. The honorific Krupāsiddhā or Krupāsāgara, meaning 'bestowed with divine grace' is used for him by tradition.

== Personal life ==
Not much is known about his early life. From his own writings it is known that he was the son of Somanatha Mahapatra and Jamuna Debi who belonged to Karan community. Balarama Dasa hailed from an aristocratic family; his father, Somanatha, a minister in the Gajapati Empire, belonged to the Karana community. Somanatha was a devout follower of Lord Jagannath and raised Balarama in a deeply religious environment. He was known by the title Mahamantri Somanatha Mohapatra in the Gajapati Empire. Balarama Dasa also served as a minister in Prataparudra Deva's court and originally belonged to the village of Erabanga in Puri district. He was educated and was well versed in Sanskrit. Balarama naturally grew to be proficient in both Odia and Sanskrit. He became a devotee of Jagannatha. It is speculated that he died while on a pilgrimage to Puri in Begunia village near Konark. There is a memorial for him near this village.

== Literary works ==
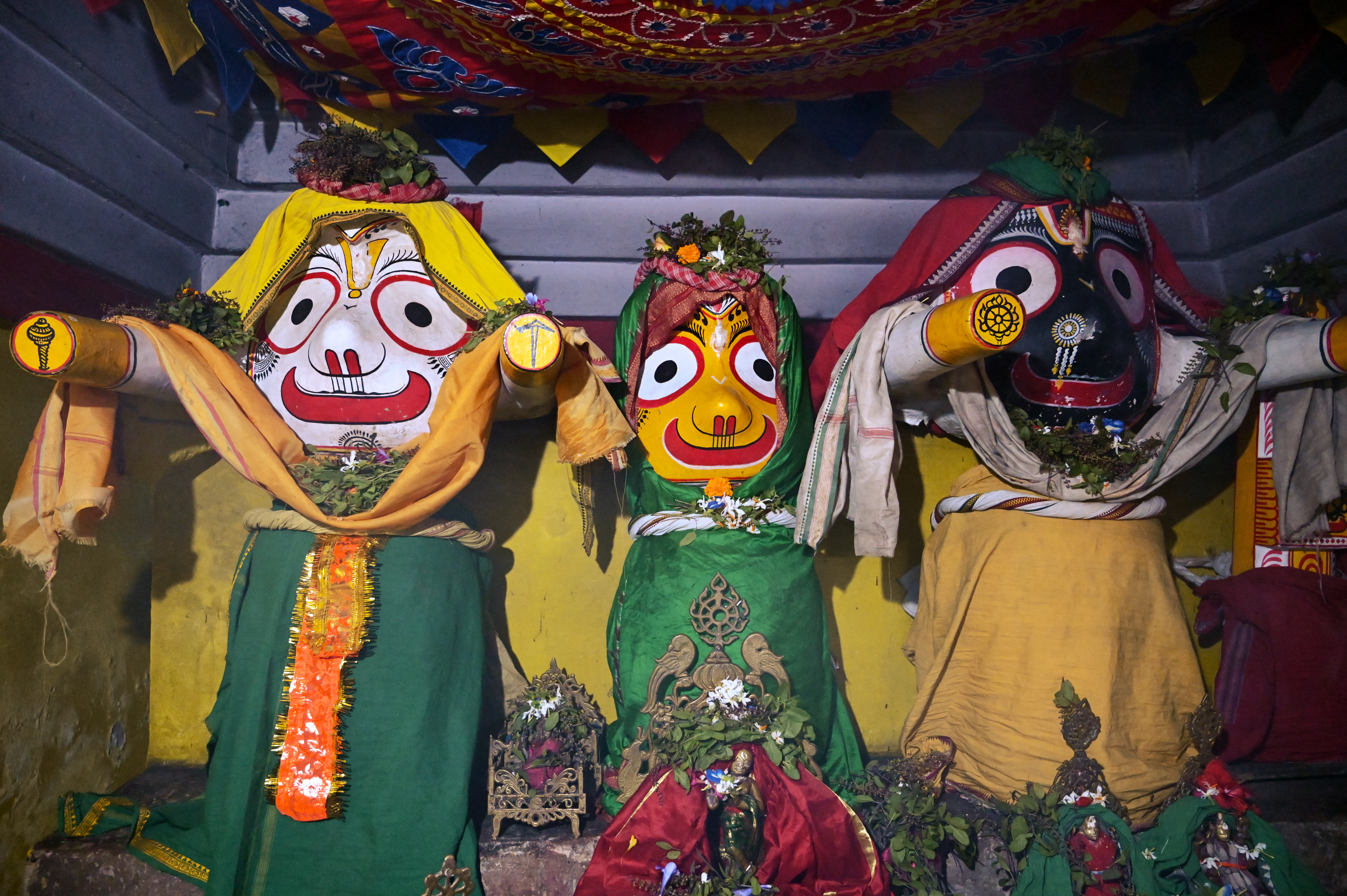
Jagannatha triad worshipped by the poet, Erabanga, Odisha

Dasa translated the Ramayana to Odia. It is also known asJagamohana Ramayana or Dandi Ramayana. More than a translation, the work is a transcreation, as it deviates in many ways from the original. In some parts he goes against the original text and in some parts follows the original text closely and yet in some other parts he creates entirely new narratives.

He also broke new grounds by translating the Bhagabat Gita into Odia. Before this the philosophical and theological texts were not translated into Odia. Even in Odia Mahabharata by Sarala Dasa, the portion containing Bhagabata Gita was omitted by the author. Balarama Dasa was subsequently persecuted by the priestly class for his translation of Bhagabata Gita.he Bhavishya Malika text was written by Panchsakhas and Balrama Das Ji was also one of them. His other works are as below.

He has also contributed to the religious texts of Bhavishya Malika, which are known to have been written by the Panchasakhas in the Odiya language.

- Jagamohana Ramayana (Dandi Ramayana)
- Lakshmi Purana
- Bedanta Sara Gupta Gita
- Gupta Gita
- Amarakosa Gita
- Srimad Bhagabad Gita (Odia)
- Bata Abakasa
- Panasa Chori
- Kamala Lochana Chautisa
- Birata Gita
- Baula Adhyaya
- Kanta Koili
- Mruguni Stuti
- Chhatisa Gupta Gita
- Saptanga Jogasara Gita
- Bhaba Samudra
- Garuda Gita
- Ananta Gita
- Arjjuna Gita
- Srabana Sara Gita
- Diptisara Gita
- Uddhaba Gita
- Bedha Parikrama
- Linga Purana
- Kurala Purana
- Brahma Purana
