= Dinanath Dalal =

Indian painter & illustrator (1916–1971)

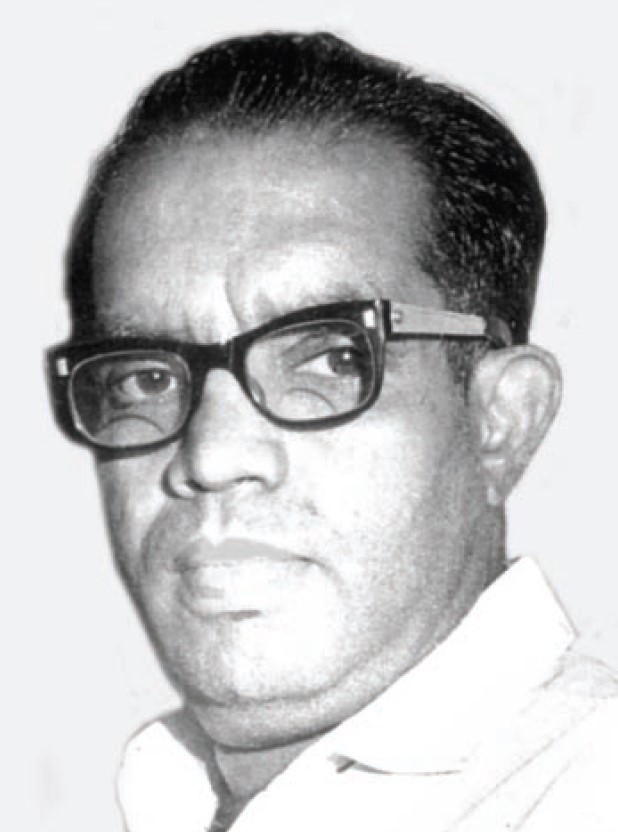
- Born: Narsingh Damodar Dalal Naik; 30 May 1916; Comba, Margao, Goa
- Died: 15 January 1971 (aged 54); Mumbai, Maharashtra
- Known for: Painting; Illustration
- Spouse: Sumati (Pandit) Dalal (m. 1943)
- Children: 4

Dinanath Dalal (30 May 1916 – 15 January 1971) was an Indian painter and illustrator. He is well-known for his artworks that gained popularity among the masses through book covers, stories, cartoons, calendars and illustrations, especially in the Deepavali magazine. His works depicted various subjects such as mythology, history, social issues, human emotions and politics.

== Early life and education ==
Dalal was born as Narsingh Damodar Dalal Naik on 30 May 1916 in Comba, a village in Margao, Goa. He belonged to a Saraswat Brahmin family who celebrated religious festivals. Thereby, Konkani was spoken at home along with English and Portuguese at school. The surroundings that he grew up in brought him closer to nature, art and language. He was also endowed with a sensitive mind and talent. Therefore, at an early age, he could easily draw sketches of school headmasters and popular leaders of the time. When he shifted to Mumbai, he also learned the Marathi language. Initially, he took formal education in classical painting at the Ketkar Art Institute in Mumbai. This was followed by his graduation from Sir J.J. School of Art in 1937.

== Career ==
=== Cartoons ===
Dalal ventured into the business world right after his graduation in 1937. Initially, he created slides and drawings for an ad distribution company named B. P. Samant & Company. Around the same time, he started drawing cartoons for Anant Kanekar's weekly Chitra. The combination of Kanekar's imagination and the caricatures of Dalal took a gibe on the political policies and the tyranny of the British Raj. Subsequently, his cartoons started to feature in Acharya Atre's Navayug and N. S. Phadke's magazine Zhankar. Young artists of the time, like Bal Thackeray and Vasant Sarwate took inspiration from Dalal's cartoons.

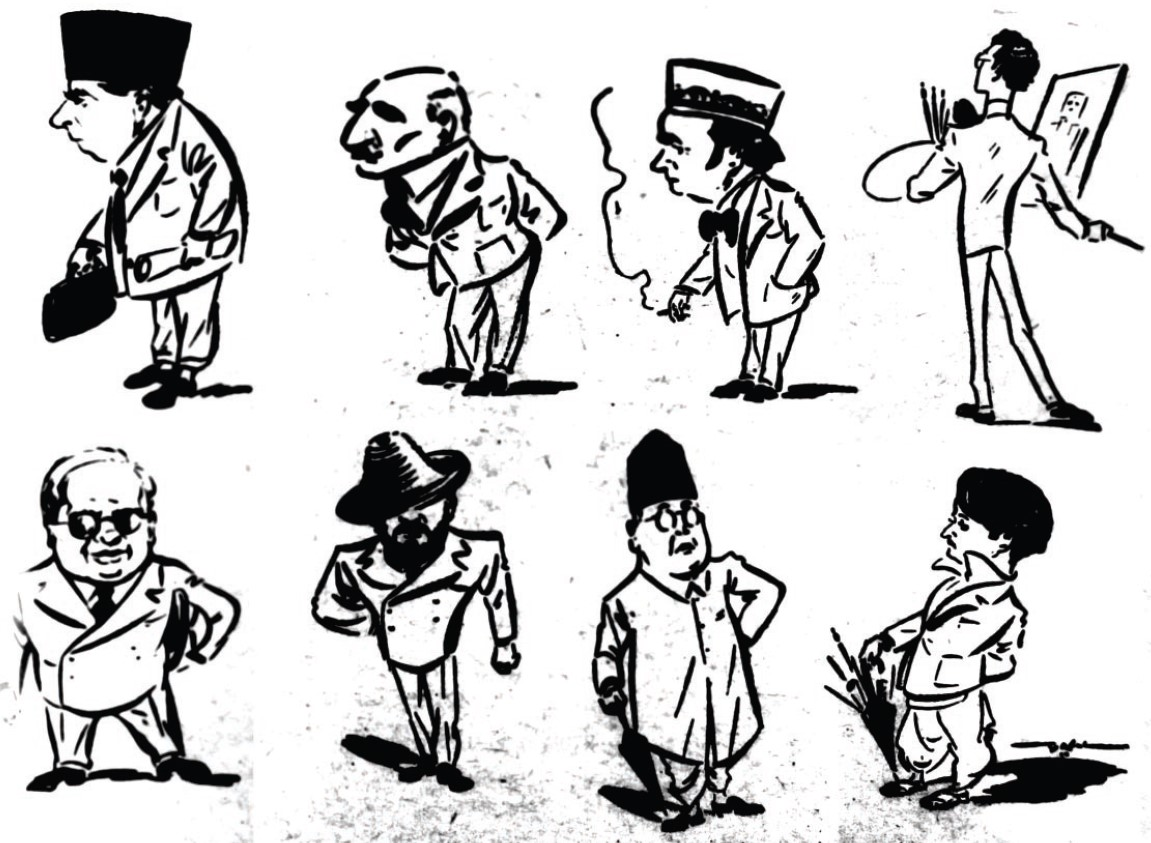
Caricatures of fellow artists by Dinanath Dalal

=== Book cover designs ===
Dalal started working for B. D. Satoskar's Sagar Prakashan in around 1938. His first cover was for the book Vaimanik Halla written by Mama Varerkar. By 1943, he had made the covers of fifteen books for Satoskar. In the same year, he started Dalal Art Studio in a small room under the stairs of Mauj Publishing House. Due to the gradual expansion of his work, the studio later relocated to a larger space near Kennedy Bridge in Mumbai in 1944.

=== The Deepavali magazine ===
Along with Roy Kinikar, Dalal started publishing the annual Diwali magazine titled Deepavali in 1945, which was in Marathi. Dalal and Kinikar deliberated carefully about the selection of literature, reviews, letters from readers, advertisements, stories, font layout, designs, color scheme, blocks, printing etc. that went into the magazine. As a result, the issue was published on time with all its beautiful content. With the fusion of literature and art, Deepavali set a new standard in the field of Marathi periodicals.

Articles from renowned writers like V. S. Khandekar, P. B. Bhave, Vijay Tendulkar, P. L. Deshpande to newcomers were published in Deepavali. P. L. Deshpande's articles like Batatyachi Chaal (1955), Asa Mi Asami, Antu Barwa, Sakharam Gatne (all 1958) and the humorous pictures drawn for these articles were first published in the magazine. Some special features of the publication included a colorful series by Dalal based on Indian Sanskrit literature such as Ragaraginya (Raga-Ragini), Barahmasa, Ritu, Nadya (Rivers), Navarasa and Sringara Nayika.

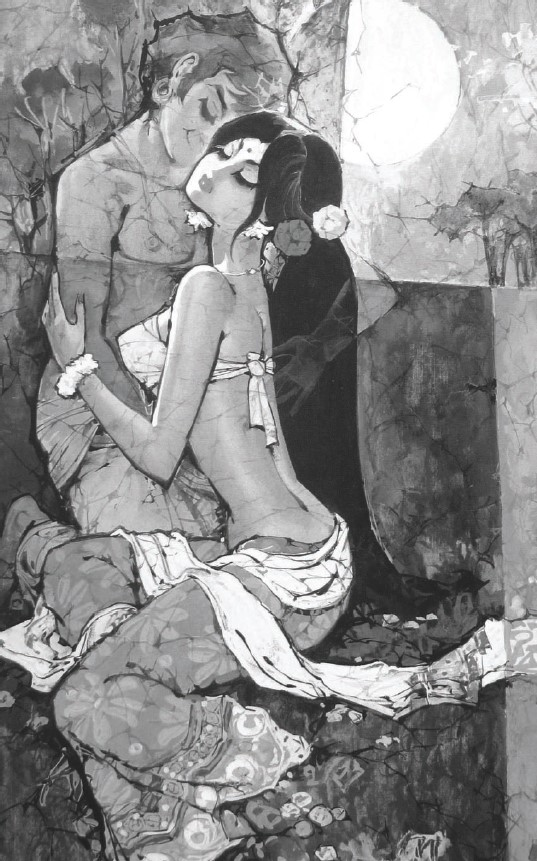
Bhavabhuti's Malati Madhava by Dinanath Dalal

Later, Deepavali came out as a monthly magazine from 1956. Dalal also published Deepavali in Hindi for almost ten years. The Hindi edition was not a translation of Marathi version. Instead, several eminent Hindi writers and poets were brought to light by Dalal and decorated with various artworks created by him. In 1965, Deepavali received a certificate of excellence from the Government of Maharashtra and the Union Government for its outstanding contribution to publication.

=== Calendars and Ads ===
Dalal created advertisements and calendars for companies like Dongre Balamrut, Kota Tiles, Dhootpapeshwar, Vartaki Tapkir, Kokuyo Camlin, Kirloskar Oil Engines. Famous film director V. Shantaram had commissioned Dalal to create the logo of Rajkamal Kalamandir. He also drew attractive pictures for Jivati Pooja that happens the month of Shraavana, which reached the temples of Maharashtra.

=== Other roles ===
Dalal was a guide at the Arts Department of the Goa Hindu Association from 1956 to 1971. Plays like Ithe Oshalla Mrityu, Lekure Udand Jahli, Matsyagandha, Natasamrat were produced during his time and he was involved in set design along with the art direction. He was also on the film selection committee for some time. He was a consultant for the advertising company Tom & Bay. Additionally, he worked as an illustrator for The Times of India for five-six years. From 1953 to 1958, Dalal also played a role in the liberation movement of Goa. Dalal gained tremendous popularity as an artist for his work. The publishing business was boosted by the attractive cover pages created by him. His personality was polite, hospitable and transparent which made the publishers, editors and fellow artists feel at home with him.

== Work ==
Dalal worked equally well in both, applied and classical arts. He had painted the portraits of a number of famous personalities, including Mahatma Gandhi, Jawaharlal Nehru and Vinoba Bhave. He created artworks for a variety of formats, including book covers, inside stories, magazine covers, and illustration series based on a specific subject for Diwali magazine. These works showcased multiple styles and attractive colors along with a touch of classical art.

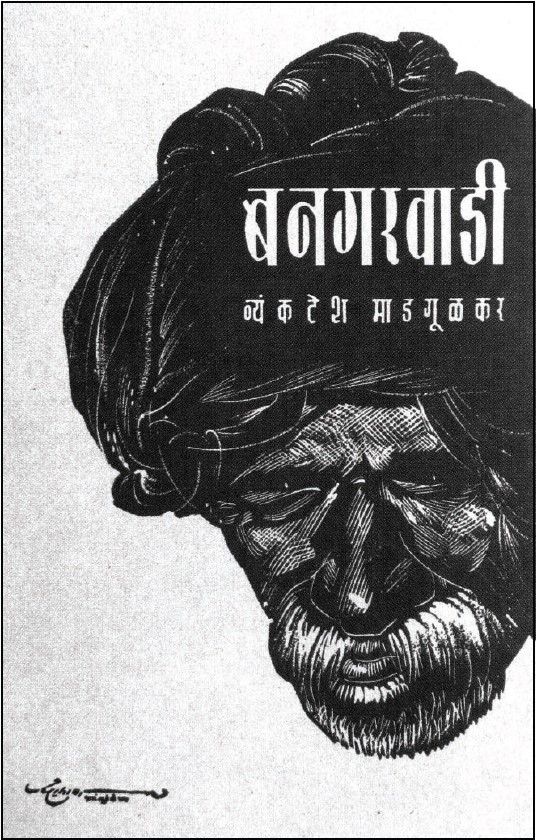
Book cover design for Bangarwadi by Dinanath Dalal

While designing book covers and illustrations, he used his skills in painting and drawing to express the meaning of the books. His paintings were varied, such as the sketches that seem to come alive with the flowing lines of the novel Bangarwadi or the black & white illustrations in the book Raja Shivchtrapati written by Babasaheb Purandare, which is a classic collection in itself. He also thought of book titles as an element of layout and a means of expression. Dalal’s front pages were among the first to showcase that book covers and illustrations are not just decorations, but that the content of the book is an innovation that enriches the image, gives personality to the book, and interacts with the reader. Commenting on Dalal's work, cartoonist and illustrater S. D. Phadnis said,"Dalal built a bridge over the divide between sensibility of an ordinary man and the art of painting."

=== Influences ===
Dalal had studied Indian miniature paintings, including the Jain and Rajput styles during his time in the Bombay School of Art. He also focused on the techniques, color schemes, compositions, shapes of Indian books, manuscripts and murals at Ajanta and Ellora Caves. Indian painters like Raja Ravi Varma, Amrita Sher-Gil, Abanindranath Tagore, S. L. Haldankar, Raghuvir Chimulkar, N. S. Bendre were his inspiration. Dalal also studied the art of European Western artists such as Vincent van Gogh, Rembrandt, Constable, and J. M. W. Turner.

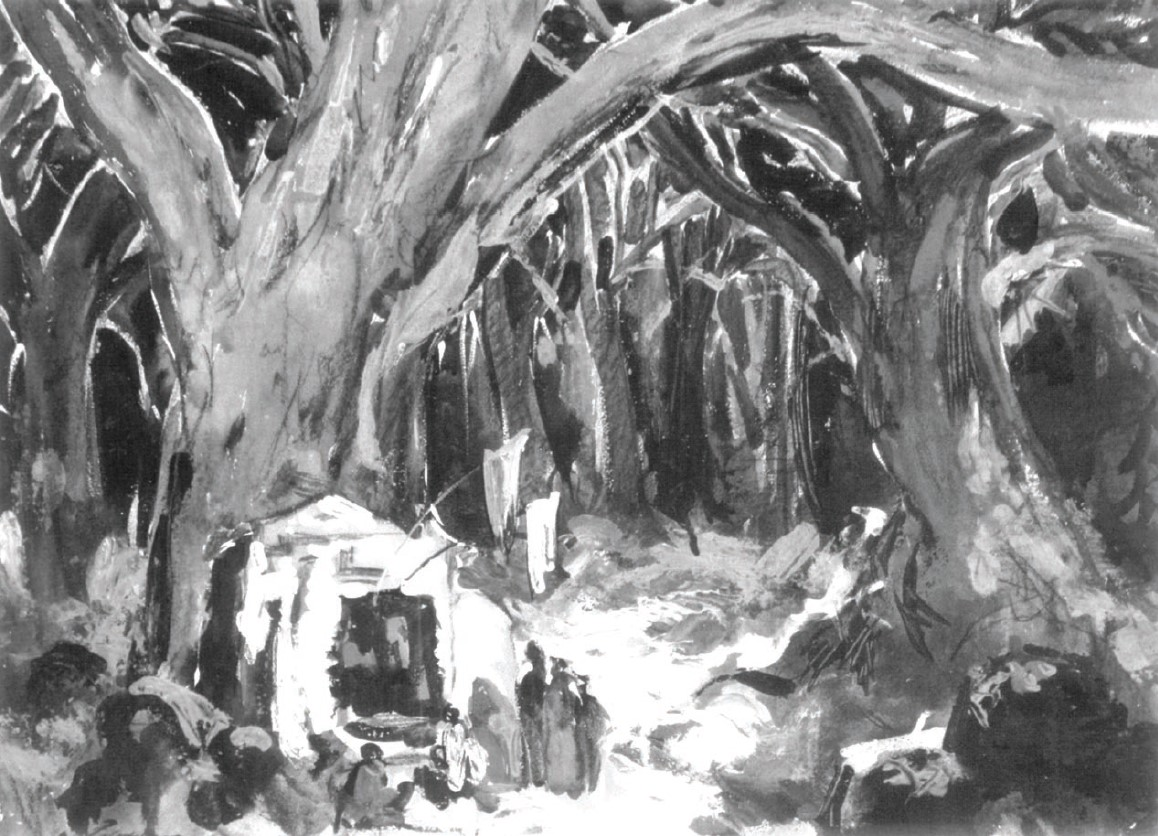
Forest by Dinanath Dalal which shows the expressionist style

The paintings made by the Dalal in watercolor and oil are influenced by contemporary painters and their paintings. Some of his landscapes, such as Forest, are as colorful as expressionist paintings. All his works show how aware and experimental he was about the art world around him. A comparative study of these paintings and the paintings in their applied art reveals how he skillfully applied the design features of classical art to professional art.

=== Style ===
The combination of Indian and Western styles provided a unique look to Dalal's artworks. It varied from realistic painting style to neo-inventive style. His paintings were characterized by good sense of morphology, effective color scheme, and simplicity which makes the picture effective by eliminating the unnecessary details. The use of Indian miniature style of drawing and the use of flat colors, on the one hand, and the fragmentation and distortion of modern paintings in an attractive way, on the other, developed a modern outlook, but rooted in the Indian art tradition.

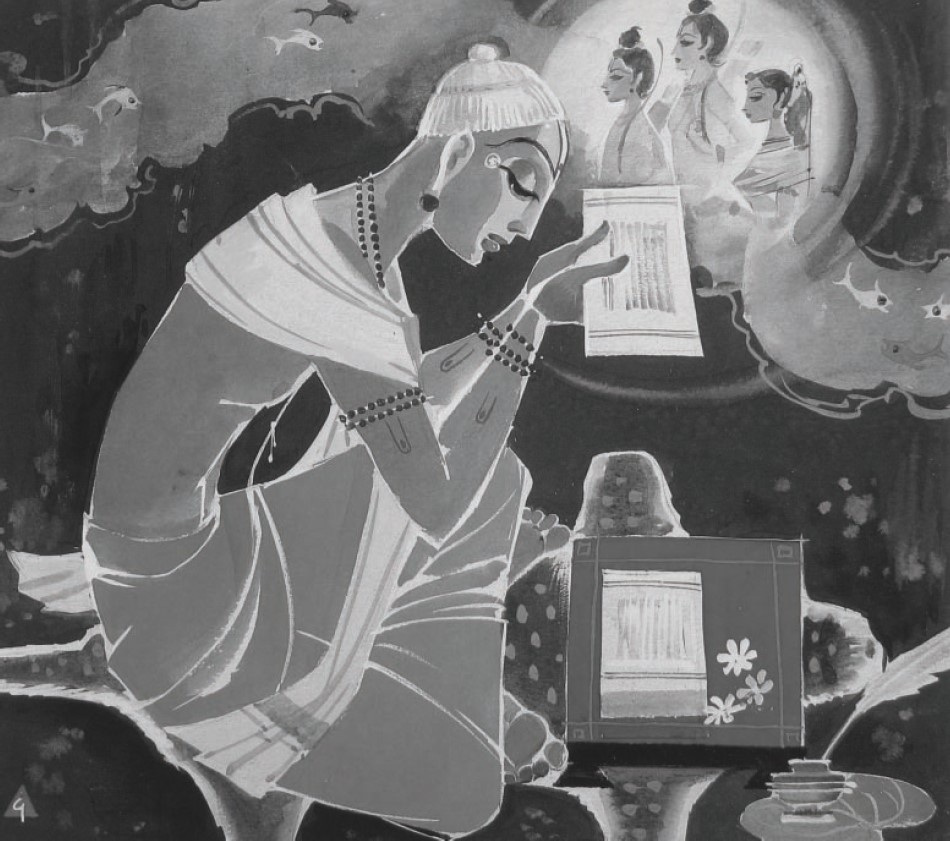
Sant Tulsidas by Dinanath Dalal with flat colors and stylized imagery

The picture of Sant Tulsidas in the Santachitra (Pictures of Saints) series has flat colors like miniature style. Faces are drawn side by side (profiled). Symbols and backgrounds are used to convey the narrative meaning of the picture. The use of white or brightly colored stripes on the face has given a contemporary look to the image. The combination of miniature style aesthetics, rhythm and three-dimensional realism in modern painting is seen here.

=== Awards and recognition ===
Dalal received numerous awards during his lifetime, some of which are listed below:

- 1939, 1942, 1947 and 1953 - Bombay Art Society Awards
- 1940 - Silver medal from Instituto Vasco da Gama (now the Institute Menezes Braganza) in Goa
- 1949 - Bronze medal from the Hyderabad Society
- 1955 - Presidential Award at the All India Art Exhibition
- 1956 - Gold medal by The Indian Academy of Fine Arts and Crafts (Amritsar)
- 1970 - Received honorary membership of Goa Hindu Association

== Personal life ==
Dalal started his independent business and married life almost simultaneously. He married Sumati Pandit in 1943, who was a fellow painter at the Ketkar Art Institute. She also had a diploma from Sir J. J. School of Art. Initially, she worked as a photographer for some periodicals. However, she later dedicated her life in raising their four daughters - Meera, Aruna, Pratima and Amita. The Deepavali magazine publication was extremely close to Dalal's heart, so much so that he had said - "Deepavali annual is my fifth Kanyaratna (daughter like gem)."

== Death and legacy ==
On 9 January 1971, the silver jubilee of Deepavali was celebrated in royal style by Dalal. Just days after this celebration, he died on 15 January 1971 in Mumbai. On his 95th birth anniversary, an exhibition of Dalal's works was organized in Pune. In December 2015 through January 2016, a retrospective exhibition was held at the Nehru Planetarium, Mumbai, to commemorate Dalal's birth centenary year. Additionally, in January 2016, a postage stamp was issued in Goa to mark his birth centenary. In the same year, Dinanath Dalal Memorial Art Education Centre was inaugurated at Ponda, Goa. A detailed biography on the life and works of Dalal, titled Dinanath Dalal: Chitra ani Charitra, authored by Suhas Bahulkar and published by Rajhans Prakashan was released on 15 January 2022.
