= Shimpi =

Indian caste

- Classification: Shudra
- Religions: Hinduism
- Languages: Marathi, Hindi
- Country: India
- Region: Maharashtra
- Notable members: Namdev

Shimpi is an umbrella term for the Indian caste traditionally involved in the business of clothing and tailoring. Saint Namdev of the Bhakti movement is revered as the patron of the community.

== Occupation ==
The traditional occupation of the community is tailoring or cloth printing. They are referred to as "Shimpi" in Marathi or "Chimpi" in Hindi.

== Government classification ==
The Shimpi are included in the central list of Other Backward Classes (OBC) by the government of Maharashtra.

== Varna ==
Shimpis are classified as being of shudra varna in the Hindu caste system.

== Notables ==
- Namdev, revered 14th-century saint of the Bhakti movement and Varkari sect
