= Bhakti movement =

Medieval Hindu religious movement

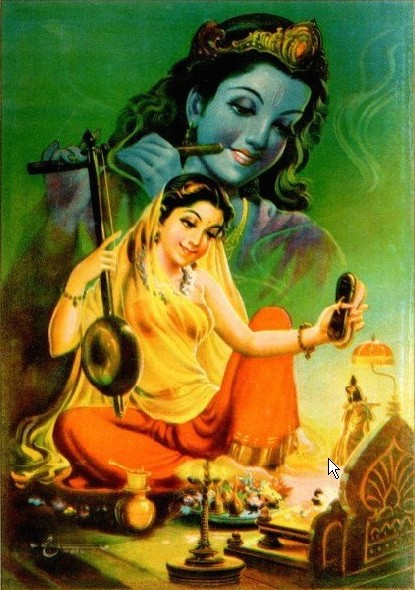
Krishna has been a major part of the Bhakti movement. One of the key devotees was Meera (pictured).

The Bhakti movement was a significant religious movement in medieval Hinduism that sought to bring religious reforms to all strata of society by adopting the method of devotion to achieve salvation. Originating in Tamilakam during the 6th century CE, it gained prominence through the poems and teachings of the Vaishnava Alvars and Shaiva Nayanars in early medieval South India, before spreading northwards. It swept over east and north India from the 15th century onwards, reaching its zenith between the 15th and 17th century CE.

The Bhakti movement regionally developed around different Hindu gods and goddesses, and some sub-sects were Vaishnavism (Vishnu), Shaivism (Shiva), Shaktism (Shakti goddesses), and Smartism. The Bhakti movement preached using the local languages so that the message reached the masses. The movement was inspired by many poet-saints, who championed a wide range of philosophical positions ranging from theistic dualism of Dvaita to absolute monism of Advaita Vedanta.

The movement has traditionally been considered an influential social reformation in Hinduism, as it provided an individual-focused alternative path to spirituality, regardless of one's birth or gender. Contemporary scholars question whether the Bhakti movement was ever a reform or rebellion of any kind. They suggest that the Bhakti movement was a revival, reworking, and recontextualisation of ancient Vedic traditions.

== Terminology ==
The Sanskrit word bhakti is derived from the root bhaj, which means "divide, share, partake, participate, to belong to". The word also means "attachment, devotion to, fondness for, homage, faith or love, worship, piety to something as a spiritual, religious principle or means of salvation".

Bhakti, in contrast, is spiritual, a love for and devotion towards religious concepts or principles, that engages both emotion and intellect. The connotation of love in this context is not one of uncritical emotion but committed engagement. The Bhakti movement in Hinduism refers to ideas and engagement that emerged in the medieval era on love and devotion to religious concepts built around one or more gods and goddesses. The Bhakti movement preached against the caste system and used local languages and so the message reached the masses. One who practices bhakti is called a bhakta.

== Textual roots ==
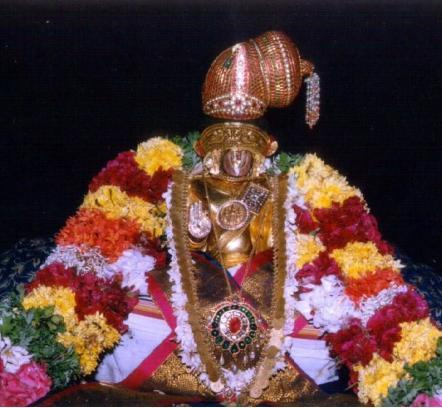
The Vaishnavite Saint Nammalvar. He is one of the most prominent of the 12 Alvars of the Vaishnavism Bhakti movement.

Ancient Indian texts, dated to the 1st millennium BCE, such as the Śvetāśvatara Upaniṣad, the Kaṭha Upaniṣad, and the Bhagavad Gita mention Bhakti.

=== Śvetāśvatara Upaniṣad ===
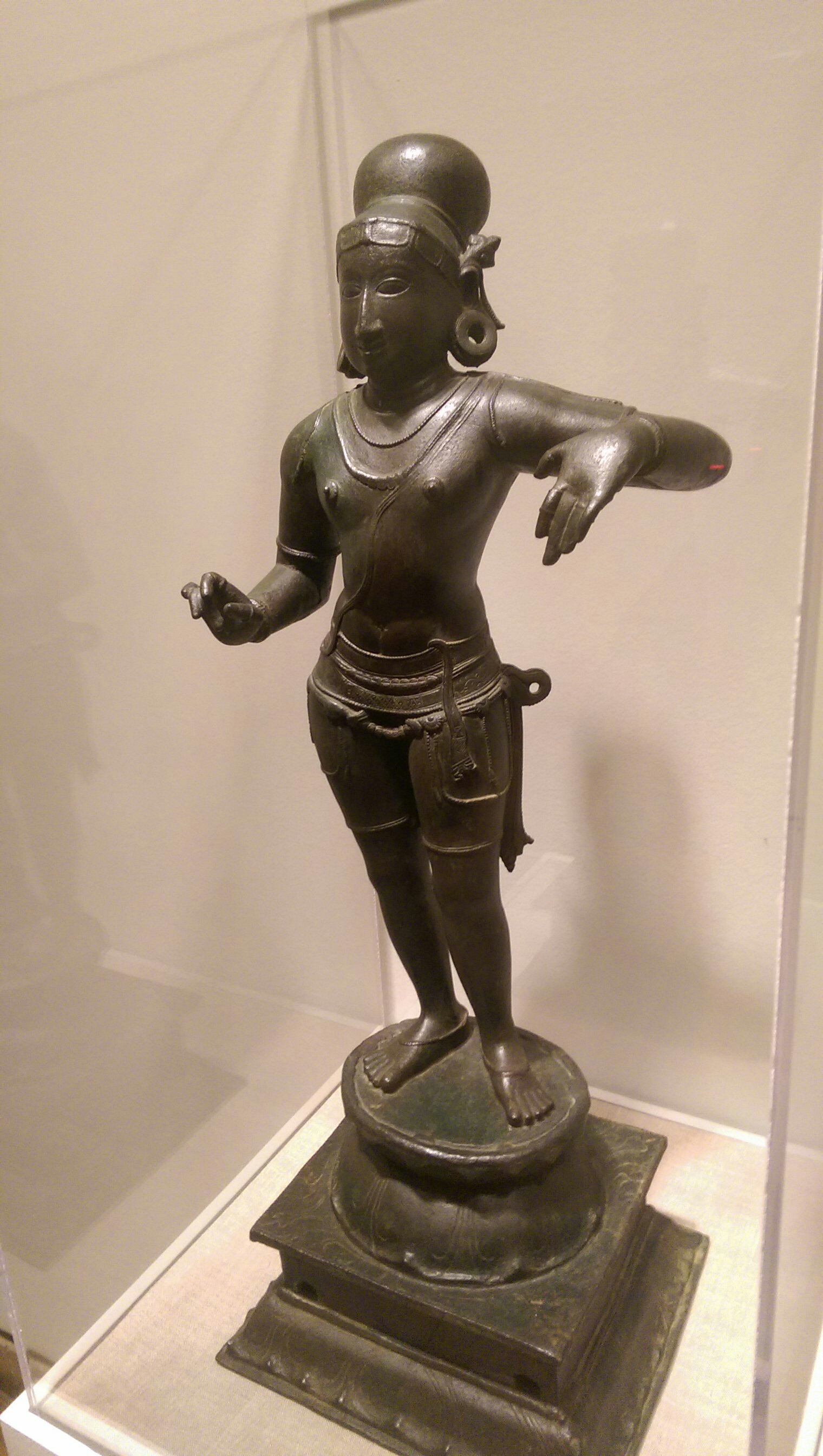
A copper alloy sculpture of a Shiva Bhakti practitioner from Tamil Nadu (11th Century or later).

The last of three epilogue verses of the Śvetāśvatara Upaniṣad, 6.23, uses the word Bhakti as follows,

यस्य देवे परा भक्तिः यथा देवे तथा गुरौ ।
तस्यैते कथिता ह्यर्थाः प्रकाशन्ते महात्मनः ॥ २३ ॥

Who has highest Bhakti (love, devotion) of Deva (God),
just like his Deva, so for his Guru (teacher),
To him who is high-minded,
these teachings will be illuminating.

This verse is notable for the use of the word Bhakti, and has been widely cited as among the earliest mentions of "the love of God". Scholars have debated whether this phrase is authentic or later insertion into the Upanishad, and whether the terms "Bhakti" and "God" meant the same in this ancient text as they do in the medieval and modern era Bhakti traditions found in India. Max Muller states that the word Bhakti appears in only one verse of the epilogue at its end, may have been a later insertion and may not be theistic as the word was later used in much Sandilya Sutras.

Grierson, as well as Carus, note that the first epilogue verse 6.21 is also notable for its use of the word Deva Prasada (देवप्रसाद, grace or gift of God), but add that Deva in the epilogue of the Śvetāśvatara Upaniṣad refers to "pantheistic Brahman" and the closing credit to sage Śvetāśvatara in verse 6.21 can mean "gift or grace of his Soul".

Doris Srinivasan states that the Upanishad is a treatise on theism, but it creatively embeds a variety of divine images, an inclusive language that allows "three Vedic definitions for a personal deity". The Upanishad includes verses wherein God can be identified with the Supreme (Brahman-Atman, Self, Soul) in Vedanta monistic theosophy, verses that support the dualistic view of Samkhya doctrines, as well as the synthetic novelty of triple Brahman where a triune exists as the divine soul (Isvara, theistic God), individual soul (self) and nature (Prakrti, matter).

Tsuchida writes that the Upanishad syncretically combines monistic ideas of the Upanishads and the self-development ideas of Yoga with personification of the deity Rudra. Hiriyanna interprets the text to be introducing "personal theism" in the form of Shiva Bhakti, with a shift to monotheism but in the henotheistic context where the individual is encouraged to discover his own definition and sense of God.

=== Bhagavad Gita ===
The Bhagavad Gita, a post-Vedic scripture composed in 5th to 2nd century BCE, introduces bhakti marga (the path of faith/devotion) as one of three ways to spiritual freedom and release, the other two being karma marga (the path of works) and jnana marga (the path of knowledge).

In verses 6.31 through 6.47 of the Bhagavad Gita, Krishna describes bhakti yoga and loving devotion as one of the several paths to the highest spiritual attainments.

=== Devi Mahatmya ===
The Devi Mahatmya embodies bhakti through three stories about the goddess Devi. In these narratives, devotion is vividly portrayed as the gods turn to Devi in times of crisis, emphasizing bhakti's central role in seeking divine aid and protection. The text prescribes rituals like recitation and worship to honor Devi, emphasizing that her Mahatmya should be recited "with bhakti" on specific days of each lunar fortnight and especially during the annual "great offering" (maha-puja) held in autumn, known today as Durga puja (Devi Mahatmya 12.4, 12.12).

== History ==
=== Initial development in Tamil lands ===
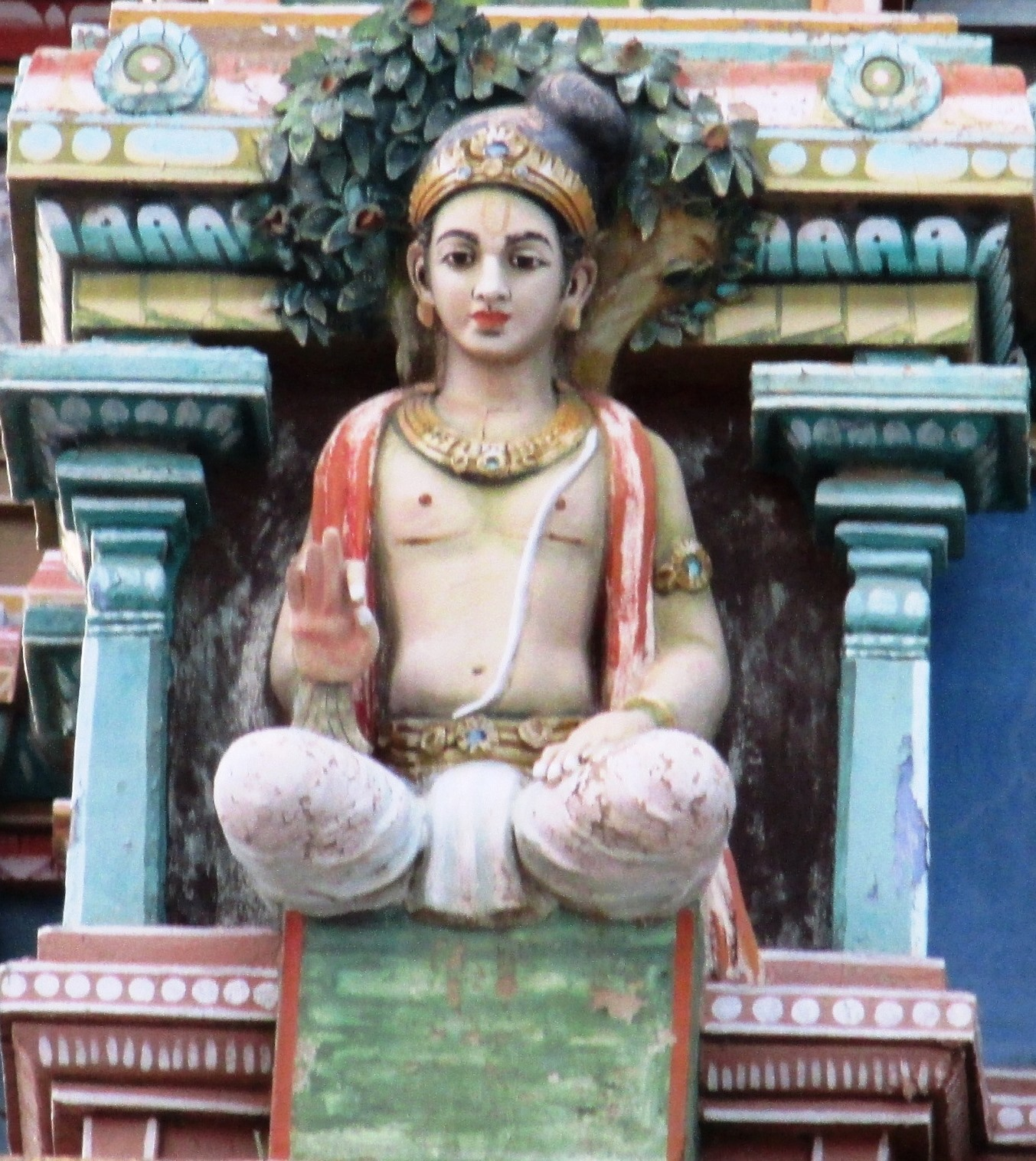
Nammalvar (c. 798 CE), one of the Tamil Alvars and author of the Tiruvaymoli and the Tiruviruttam

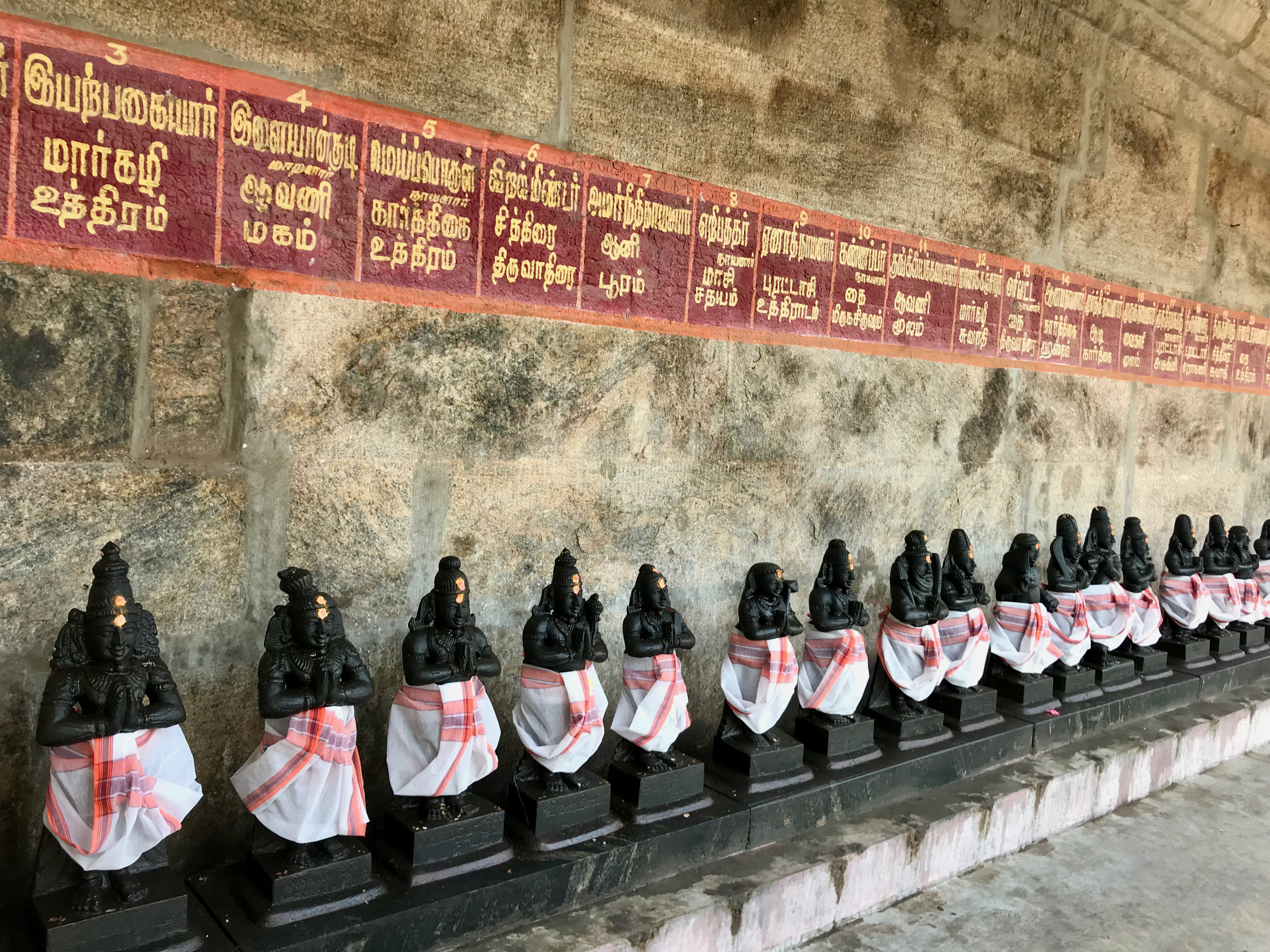
Nayanars gallery at the Thiruthalinathar Shiva temple, Tiruppathur, a Shaiva Siddhanta temple. One important foundation of the Shaiva Siddhantha tradition is the Shaiva bhakti of the Nayanars.

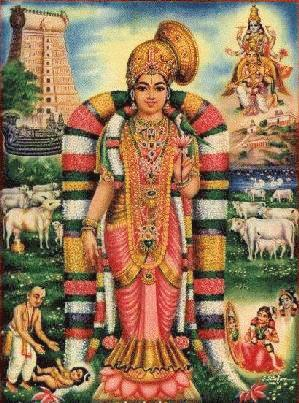
Depiction of Andal, a major poet of the Bhakti movement of Vaishnavism

The Bhakti movement originated in Tamilakam during the seventh to eighth century CE, and remained influential in South India for some time. In the second millennium, a second wave of bhakti spread northwards through Karnataka (c. 12th century) and gained wide acceptance in fifteenth-century Assam, Bengal and northern India.

According to Brockington, the initial Tamil Bhakti movement was characterized by "a personal relationship between the deity and the devotee", and "fervent emotional experience in response to divine grace". The Bhakti movement in Tamil Nadu was composed of two main parallel groups: Shaivas (who also worshipped local deities like Shiva or his son Murugan/Kartikeya) and Vaishnavas (who also worshipped local deities like Tirumāl). The Vaishnava Alvars and Shaiva Nayanars lived between 5th and 9th century CE. They promoted love of a personal God first and foremost which is also expressed by love of one's fellow human beings. They also wrote and sang hymns of praise to their God, and came from numerous social classes, even shudras. These poet saints became the backbone of the Sri Vaishnava and Shaiva Siddhanta traditions.

The Alvars, which literally means "those immersed in God", were Vaishnava poet-saints who sang praises of Vishnu as they traveled from one place to another. They established temple sites such as Srirangam, and spread ideas about Vaishnavism. Various poems were compiled as Alvar Arulicheyalgal or Divya Prabandham, developed into an influential scripture for the Vaishnavas. The Bhagavata Purana's references to the South Indian Alvar saints, along with its emphasis on bhakti, have led many scholars to give it South Indian origins though some scholars question whether that evidence excludes the possibility that Bhakti movement had parallel developments in other parts of India.

Like the Alvars, the Shaiva Nayanars were Bhakti poet saints. The Tirumurai, a compilation of hymns on Shiva by sixty-three Nayanar poet-saints, developed into an influential scripture in Shaivism. The poets' itinerant lifestyle helped create temple and pilgrimage sites and spread spiritual ideas built around Shiva. Early Tamil-Shiva Bhakti poets influenced Hindu texts that came to be revered all over India.

=== Spread throughout India in the 2nd millennium ===
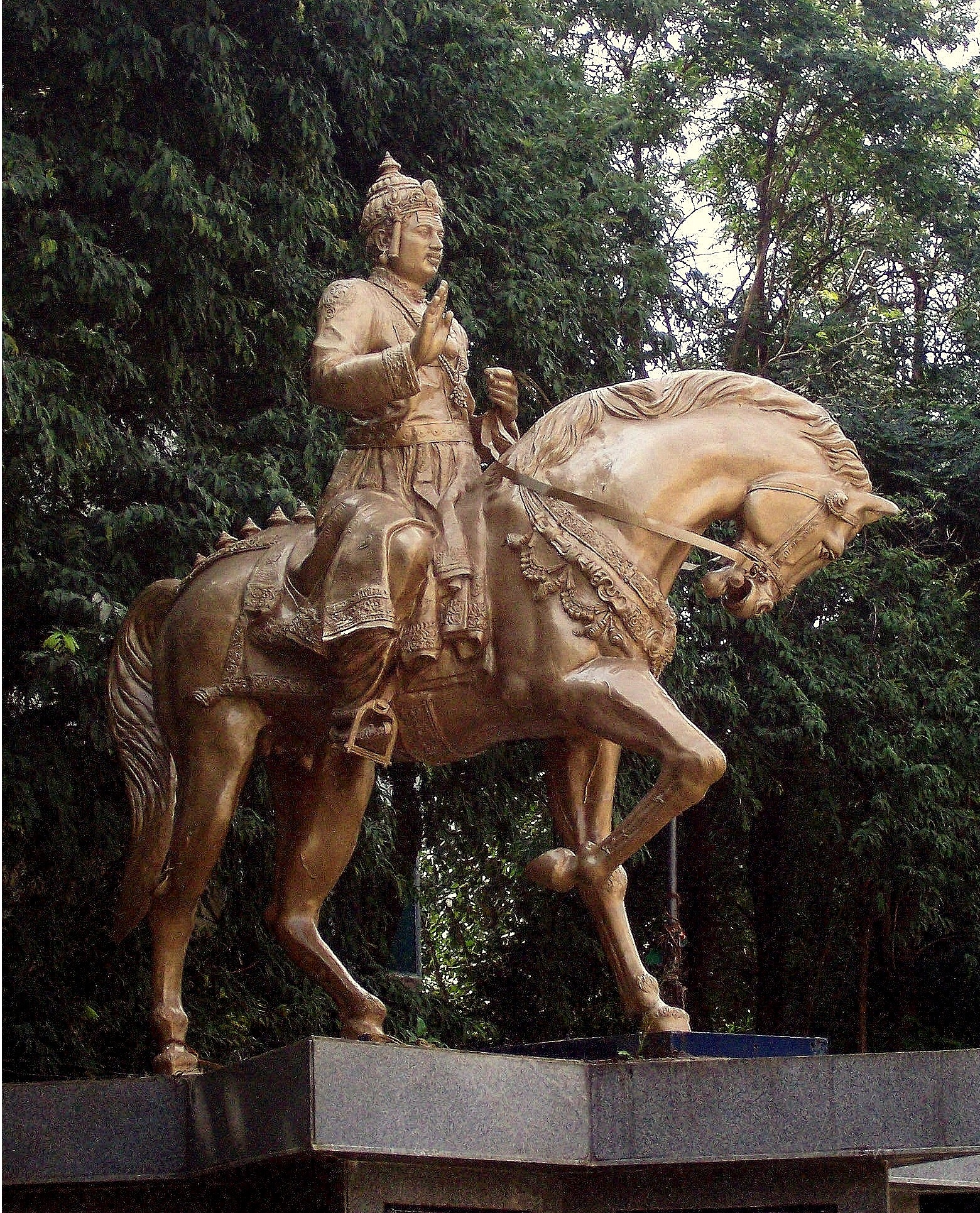
Statue of Basava (1131–1196), founder of Lingayatism

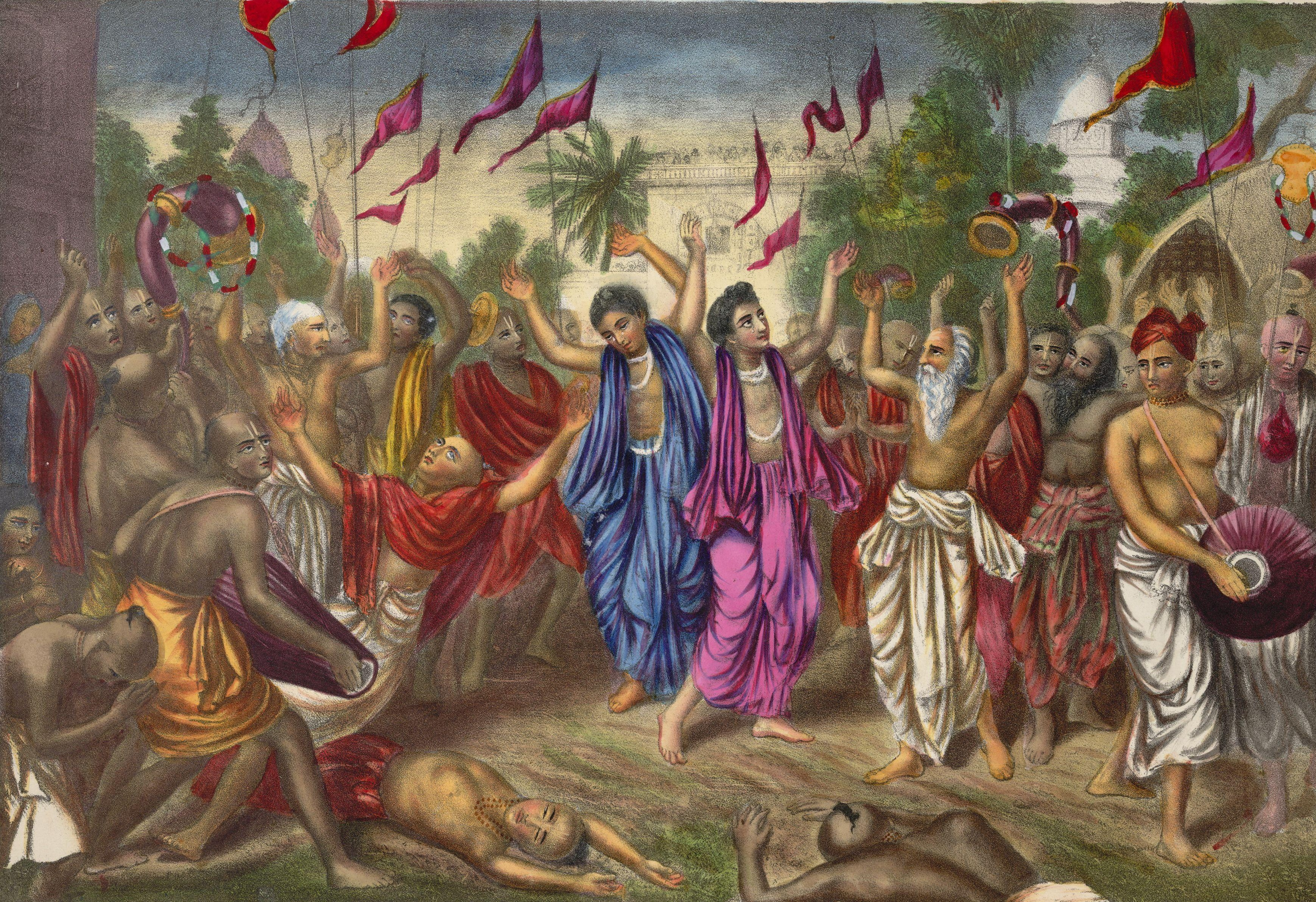
Chaitanya Mahaprabhu leading the Vaishnavas in 'Nagar kirtan', devotional chanting and dancing, in the streets of Nabadwip, Bengal.

The influence of the Tamil bhakti saints and those of later northern Bhakti leaders ultimately helped spread bhakti poetry and ideas throughout all the Indian subcontinent by the 18th century CE. However, outside of the Tamil speaking regions, the Bhakti movement arrived much later, mostly in the second millennium.

For example, in Kannada-speaking regions (roughly modern Karnataka), the Bhakti movement arrived in the 12th century, with the emergence of Basava and his Shaivite Lingayatism, which were known for their total rejection of caste distinctions and the authority of the Vedas, their promotion of the religious equality of women, and their focus on worshipping a small lingam, which they always carried around their necks, as opposed to images in temples run by elite priesthoods. Another important Kannada figure in the Bhakti movement was Madhvacharya (c. 12–13th centuries), a great and prolific scholar of Vedanta, who promoted the theology of dualism (Dvaita Vedanta).

Similarly, the Bhakti movement in Odisha (known as Jñanamisrita bhakti or Dadhya Bhakti) also began in the 12th century. It included various scholars including Jayadeva (the 12th-century author of the Gita Govinda), and it had become a mass movement by the 14th century. Figures like Balarama Dasa, Achyutananda, Jasobanta Dasa, Ananta Dasa and Jagannatha Dasa preached Bhakti through public sankirtans across Odisha. Jagannath was and remains the center of the Odisha Bhakti movement.

The Bhakti movements also spread to the north later, particularly during the flowering of northern Bhakti yoga of the 15th and the 16th centuries. Perhaps the earliest of the northern bhakti figures was Nimbārkāchārya (c. 12th century), a Brahmin from Andhra Pradesh who moved to Vrindavan. He defended a similar theology to Ramanuja, which he called Bhedābheda (difference and non-difference). Other important northern bhaktas include Nāmdev (c. 1270–1350), Rāmānanda, and Eknath (c. 1533–1599).

Another important development was the rise of the Sant Mat movement, which drew from Nath tradition and Vaishnavism. Kabir was a saint known for Hindi poetry that expressed a rejection of external religion in favor of inner experience. After his death, his followers founded the Kabir panth. A similar movement sharing the same Sant Mat Bhakti background that drew on both Hinduism and Islam, was founded by the Guru Nānak (1469–1539), the first Guru of Sikhism.

In Bengal, the most famous composer of Vaishnava devotional songs was Candīdās (1339–1399). He was celebrated in the popular Bengali Vaishnava-Sahajiya movement. One the most influential of the northern Hindu Bhakti traditions was the Krishnaite Gaudiya Vaishnavism of Chaitanya Mahaprabhu (1486–1534) in Bengal. Chaitanya eventually came to be seen by the Bengali Vaishnavas as an avatara of Krishna himself. Another important leader of northern Vaishnava Bhakti was Vallabhacharya Mahaprabhu (1479–1531 CE) who founded the Pushtimarg tradition in Braj (Vraja).

Some scholars state that the Bhakti movement's rapid spread in India in the 2nd millennium was in part a response to the arrival of Islam and subsequent Islamic rule in India and Hindu-Muslim conflicts. That view is contested by some scholars, with Rekha Pande stating that singing ecstatic Bhakti hymns in local language had been a tradition in South India before Muhammad was born. According to Pande, the psychological impact of Muslim conquests may have initially contributed to community-style Bhakti by Hindus. However, other scholars state that Muslim invasions, the conquests of Hindu Bhakti temples in South India and the seizure and the melting of musical instruments such as cymbals from local people were part responsible for the later relocation or demise of singing Bhakti traditions in the 18th century.

According to Wendy Doniger, the nature of the Bhakti movement may have been affected by the daily practices to "surrender to God" of Islam when it arrived in India. In turn, that influenced devotional practices in Islam such as Sufism, and other religions in India from the 15th century onwards, such as Sikhism, Christianity, and Jainism.

Klaus Witz, in contrast, traces the history and nature of the Bhakti movement to the Upanishadic and the Vedanta foundations of Hinduism. He writes that in virtually every Bhakti movement poet, "the Upanishadic teachings form an all-pervasive substratum, if not a basis. We have here a state of affairs that has no parallel in the West. Supreme Wisdom, which can be taken as basically non-theistic and as an independent wisdom tradition (not dependent on the Vedas), appears fused with the highest level of bhakti and with the highest level of God-realization."

=== Key figures ===
The Bhakti movement witnessed a surge in Hindu literature in regional languages, particularly in the form of devotional poems and music. This literature includes the writings of the Alvars and Nayanars, poems of Andal, Basava, Bhagat Pipa, Allama Prabhu, Akka Mahadevi, Vallabhacharya, Vitthalanatha/Gusainji, Kabir, Guru Nanak (founder of Sikhism), Tulsidas, Nabha Dass,, Ghananand, Ramananda (founder of Ramanandi Sampradaya), Ravidass, Sripadaraja, Vyasatirtha, Purandara Dasa, Kanakadasa, Vijaya Dasa, Six Goswamis of Vrindavan, Raskhan, Ravidas, Jayadeva Goswami, Namdev, Eknath, Tukaram, Mirabai, Ramprasad Sen, Sankardev,, Narsinh Mehta, Gangasati and the teachings of saints like Chaitanya Mahaprabhu.

The writings of Sankaradeva in Assam, however, included an emphasis on the regional language and also led to the development of an artificial literary language called Brajavali. Brajavali is, to an extent, a combination of medieval Maithili and Assamese. The language was easily understood by the local populace, in line with the Bhakti movement's call for inclusion, but also retained its literary style. A similar language, called Brajabuli was popularised by Vidyapati, which was adopted by several writers in Odisha in the medieval times, and in Bengal during its renaissance.

The earliest writers from the 7th to 10th centuries, who are known to have influenced the movements driven by poet-saints, include Sambandar, Tirunavukkarasar, Sundarar, Nammalvar, Adi Shankara, Manikkavacakar and Nathamuni. Several 11th- and 12th-century writers developed different philosophies within the Vedanta school of Hinduism that were influential to the Bhakti tradition in medieval India, and they include Ramanuja, Madhva, Vallabha and Nimbarka. These writers championed a spectrum of philosophical positions ranging from theistic dualism, qualified nondualism and absolute monism.

The Bhakti movement also witnessed several works getting translated into various Indian languages. Saundarya Lahari was written in Sanskrit by Adi Shankara and was translated into Tamil in the 12th century by Virai Kaviraja Pandithar, who titled the book Abhirami Paadal. Similarly, the first translation of the Ramayana into an Indo-Aryan language was by Madhava Kandali, who translated it into Assamese as the Saptakanda Ramayana.

Shandilya and Narada are credited with two Bhakti texts, Shandilya Bhakti Sutra and Narada Bhakti Sutra, but both have been dated to the 12th century by modern scholars.

== Theology ==
The Bhakti movement of Hinduism saw two ways of imaging the nature of the divine (Brahman): Nirguna and Saguna. Nirguna Brahman was the concept of the ultimate reality as formless and without attributes or quality. Saguna Brahman, in contrast, was envisioned and developed as with form, attributes and quality.

Both views had parallels in the ancient pantheistic formless and theistic traditions, respectively, and are traceable to a dialogue in the Bhagavad Gita. These two may be considered to be the same Brahman, as viewed from two perspectives: a formless mode focused on wisdom (jñana) and a form mode, focused on love. Nirguna Bhakti poetry is more focused on jñana, and Saguna bhakti poetry focuses on love (prema). In Bhakti, the emphasis is reciprocal love and devotion in which the devotee loves God, and God loves the devotee.

The concepts of Nirguna and Saguna Brahman, which is at the root of Bhakti theology, underwent more profound developments with the ideas of the Vedanta schools, particularly those of Adi Shankara's 8th-century Advaita Vedanta (absolute nondualism / monism), Ramanuja's 12th-century Vishishtadvaita Vedanta (a qualified nondualism that posits unity and diversity), and Madhvacharya's (c. 12th-13th century) Dvaita Vedanta (which posits a true dualism between God and the Ātman).

According to David Lorenzen, the idea of bhakti for a Nirguna Brahman has been a baffling one to scholars since it offers "heart-felt devotion to a God without attributes, without even any definable personality". However, given the "mountains of Nirguni bhakti literature", Bhakti for Nirguna Brahman has been a part of the reality of the Hindu tradition along with the Bhakti for Saguna Brahman. Thus, these were two alternate ways of imagining God even in the Bhakti movement.

The Nirguna and Saguna forms of Bhakti may be found in two 12th-century treatises on bhakti: the Sandilya Bhakti Sutra and Narada Bhakti Sutra. Sandilya leans towards Nirguna Bhakti, and Narada leans towards Saguna Bhakti.

=== Salvation ===
According to J. L. Brockington, the Sri Vaishnavas had split into two subsects in the 14th century:

the dispute was over the question of human effort versus divine grace in achieving salvation, a controversy often and not unreasonably compared to the Arminian and Calvinist standpoints within Protestantism. The Northern school held that the worshipper had to make some effort to win the grace of the Lord and emphasised the performance of karma, a position commonly summed up as being ‘on the analogy of the monkey and its young’, for as the monkey carries her young which cling to her body so Visnu saves the worship per who himself makes an effort. The Southern school held that the Lord’s grace itself conferred salvation, a position ‘on the analogy of the cat and its kittens’, for just as the cat picks up her kittens in her mouth and carries them off willy-nilly, so Visnu saves whom he wills, without effort on their part.

== Social Impact ==
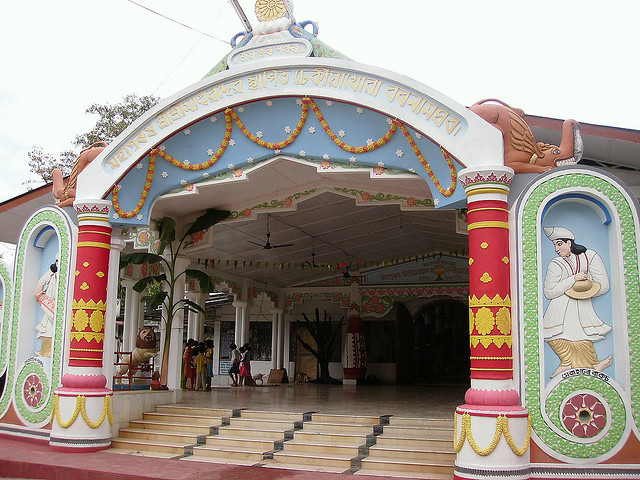
Dhekiakhowa Bornamghar at Jorhat. Namghars are places of congregational worship and centres of local self-governance in Assam, introduced by Bhakti saints such as Sankaradeva, Madhavadeva and Damodaradeva

The Bhakti movement led to devotional transformation of medieval Hindu society, and Vedic rituals or alternatively ascetic monk-like lifestyle for moksha gave way to individualistic loving relationship with a personally defined god. Salvation, which had been considered attainable only by men of the Brahmin, Kshatriya and Vaishya castes, became available to everyone. Most scholars state that Bhakti movement provided women and members of the Shudra and untouchable communities an inclusive path to spiritual salvation. Some scholars disagree that the Bhakti movement was premised on such social inequalities.

Poet-saints grew in popularity, and literature on devotional songs in regional languages became profuse. These poet-saints championed a wide range of philosophical positions within their society, ranging from the theistic dualism of Dvaita to the absolute monism of Advaita Vedanta. Kabir, a poet-saint, for example, wrote in Upanishadic style, the state of knowing truth:

There's no creation or creator there,
no gross or fine, no wind or fire,
no sun, moon, earth, or water,
no radiant form, no time there,
no word, no flesh, no faith,
no cause and effect, nor any thought of the Veda,
no Hari or Brahma, no Shiva or Shakti,
no pilgrimage and no rituals,
no mother, father, or guru there...

— Kabir, Shabda 43, Translated by K Schomer and WH McLeod

The early-15th-century Bhakti poet-Sant Pipa stated:

Within the body is the god, the temple,
within the body all the Jangamas
within the body the incense, the lamps, and the food-offerings,
within the body the puja-leaves.

After searching so many lands,
I found the nine treasures within my body,
Now there will be no further going and coming,
I swear by Rama.

— Pīpā, Gu dhanasari, Translated by Vaudeville

The Bhakti movement also led to the prominence of the concept of female devotion, poet-saints such as Andal coming to occupy the popular imagination of the common people along with her male counterparts. Andal went a step further by composing hymns in praise of God in vernacular Tamil, rather than Sanskrit, in verses known as the Nachiyar Tirumoli, or the Woman's Sacred Verses:

Clouds that spill lovely pearls

what message has the dark-hued lord of Venkatam sent through you? The fire of desire has invaded my body I suffer. I lie awake here in the thick of night,

a helpless target for the cool southern breeze.

— Andal, Nachiyar Tirumoli, Verse 8.2

The impact of the Bhakti movement in India was similar to that of the Protestant Reformation of Christianity in Europe. It evoked shared religiosity, direct emotional and intellection of the divine and the pursuit of spiritual ideas without the overhead of institutional superstructures. Practices emerged bringing new forms of spiritual leadership and social cohesion among the medieval Hindus such as community singing, the chanting together of deity names; festivals; pilgrimages; and rituals relating to Saivism, Vaishnavism and Shaktism. Many of these regional practices have survived into the modern era.

=== Seva, dāna, and community kitchens ===
The Bhakti movement introduced new forms of voluntary social giving such as Seva (service, for example to a temple or guru school or community construction), dāna (charity), and community kitchens with free shared food. Of community kitchen concepts, the vegetarian Guru ka Langar, which was introduced by Nanak, became a well-established institution over time, started with northwest India, and expanded to everywhere Sikh communities are found. Other saints such as Dadu Dayal championed the similar social movement, a community that believed in the concepts of ahimsa (non-violence) towards all living beings, social equality, a vegetarian kitchen and mutual social service. Bhakti temples and matha (Hindu monasteries) of India adopted social functions such as relief to victims after a natural disaster, helping the poor and marginal farmers, providing community labor, feeding houses for the poor, free hostels for poor children and promoting folk culture.

== In other Indian religions ==
=== Jainism ===
Bhakti has been a prevalent practice in various Jaina sects in which learned Tirthankara (Jina) and human gurus are considered superior beings and venerated with offerings, songs and Arti prayers. The Bhakti movement in later Hinduism and Jainism may share roots in vandal and puja concepts of the Jaina tradition.

=== Buddhism ===
Medieval-era Bhakti traditions among non-theistic Indian traditions such as Buddhism and Jainism have been reported by scholars in which the devotion and prayer ceremonies were dedicated to an enlightened guru, primarily Buddha and Jina Mahavira, respectively, as well as others. Karel Werner notes that Bhatti (Bhakti in Pali) has been a significant practice in Theravada Buddhism, and states that "there can be no doubt that deep devotion or bhakti / Bhatti does exist in Buddhism and that it had its beginnings in the earliest days".

=== Sikhism ===
Some scholars say Sikhism is a part of the Bhakti tradition of India. In Sikhism, "nirguni Bhakti" is emphasised: devotion to a divine without Gunas (qualities or form), but it accepts both nirguni and saguni forms of the divine.

The Guru Granth Sahib, the scripture of the Sikhs, contains the hymns of 6 (possibly 7 or 8) out of the 10 Sikh gurus, 14 Hindu bhagats and one Muslim Bhagat. Some of the bhagats whose hymns were included in the Guru Granth Sahib, were Bhakti poets who taught their ideas before the birth of Guru Nanak, the first Sikh guru. The fourteen Hindu bhagats whose hymns were entered into the text were poet saints of the Bhakti movement, and included Namdev, Pipa, Ravidas, Kabir, Beni, Bhikhan, Dhanna, Jayadeva, Parmanand, Sadhana, Sain, Surdas and Trilochan, and the one Muslim bhagat and Sufi saint Baba Farid.

Most of the 5,894 hymns in the Sikh scriptures came from the Sikh gurus, the rest from the Bhagats. The three highest contributions in the Sikh scripture of non-Sikh bhagats were from Bhagat Kabir (541 hymns), Bhagat Farid (134 hymns) and Bhagat Namdev (62 hymns).

Sikhism shared beliefs with the Bhakti movement, and incorporated hymns from the Bhakti poet-saints, it was not simply an extension of the Bhakti movement. For instance, it disagreed with some of the views of the Bhakti sants Kabir and Ravidas. (Note: These views include Sikhs believing in achieving blissful mukhti while alive, Sikhs emphasizing the path of the householder, Sikh's disbelief in Ahinsa, and the Sikhs afterlife aspect of merging with God rather than physical heaven.)

Guru Nanak, the first Sikh Guru, shared some devotional ideas with the Bhakti movement but founded Sikhism, teaching the oneness of God beyond religious labels—he famously said, ‘There is no Hindu, there is no Muslim, only God’. He taught, states Jon Mayled, that the most important form of worship is Bhakti. Nam-simran – the realisation of God – is an important Bhakti practice in Sikhism. Guru Arjan, in his Sukhmani Sahib, recommended the true religion is one of loving devotion to God. The Sikh scripture Guru Granth Sahib includes suggestions for a Sikh to perform constant Bhakti. (Note: The Sikh scripture includes many verses on devotional worship. For example, They remain in ecstasy forever, day and night; O servant Nanak, they sing the Glorious Praises of the Lord, night and day. One who calls himself a Sikh of the Guru, the True Guru, shall rise in the early morning hours and meditate on the Lord's Name. Upon arising early in the morning, he is to bathe, and cleanse himself in the pool of nectar. Following the Instructions of the Guru, he is to chant the Name of the Lord, Har, Har. All sins, misdeeds and negativity shall be erased. (...) – Sri Guru Granth Sahib, 305(16)–306(2)) The Bhakti themes in Sikhism also incorporate Shakti (power) ideas.

Some Sikh sects outside Punjab, such as those found in Maharashtra and Bihar, practice Arti with lamps in a gurdwara. Arti and devotional prayer ceremonies are also found in Ravidassia sect

== Debates in contemporary scholarship ==
Contemporary scholars question whether the 19th- and early 20th-century theories about the Bhakti movement in India, its origin, nature and history are accurate. Pechilis in her book on the Bhakti movement, for example, states:

Scholars writing on bhakti in the late nineteenth and early twentieth centuries were agreed that bhakti in India was preeminently a monotheistic reform movement. For these scholars, the inextricable connection between monotheism and reform has both theological and social significance in terms of the development of Indian culture. The orientalist images of bhakti were formulated in a context of discovery: a time of organized cultural contact, in which many agencies, including administrative, scholarly, and missionary – sometimes embodied in a single person – sought knowledge of India. Through the Indo-European language connection, early orientalists believed that they were, in a sense, seeing their own ancestry in the antique texts and "antiquated" customs of Indian peoples. In this respect, certain scholars could identify with the monotheism of bhakti. Seen as a reform movement, bhakti presented a parallel to the orientalist agenda of intervention in the service of the empire.

— Karen Pechilis, The Embodiment of Bhakti

Madeleine Biardeau states, like Jeanine Miller, that the Bhakti movement was neither reform nor a sudden innovation but the continuation and expression of ideas to be found in Vedas, Bhakti Marga teachings of the Bhagavad Gita, the Katha Upanishad and the Shvetashvatara Upanishad.

John Stratton Hawley describes recent scholarship that questions the old theory of the Bhakti movement's origin and story of art coming from the south and moving north". He states that the movement had multiple origins by mentioning Brindavan in North India as another centre. Hawley describes the controversy and disagreements between Indian scholars and quotes Hegde's concern of Bhakti movement being a reform a theory that has been supported by "cherry-picking particular songs from a large corpus of Bhakti literature". He states that if the entirety of the literature by any single author like Basava is considered along with its historical context, there is neither reform nor a need for reform.

Sheldon Pollock writes that the Bhakti movement was neither a rebellion against Brahmins and the upper castes nor a rebellion against Sanskrit since many of the prominent thinkers and earliest champions of the Bhakti movement were Brahmins or from other upper castes. Also, early and later Bhakti poetry and other literature werre in Sanskrit. Further, Pollock considers that evidence of Bhakti trends in ancient Southeast Asian Hinduism in the 1st millennium CE, such as those in Cambodia and Indonesia, where the Vedic period was unknown, and upper-caste Tamil Hindu nobles and merchants introduced Bhakti ideas of Hinduism, suggest that the roots and the nature of the Bhakti movement were primarily spiritual and political quests, rather than the rebellion of some form.

John Guy states that the evidence of Hindu temples and Chinese inscriptions from the 8th century CE about Tamil merchants presents Bhakti motifs in Chinese trading towns, particularly Quanzhou's Kaiyuan Temple. They show that Saivite, Vaishnavite and Hindu Brahmin monasteries revered Bhakti themes in China.

Scholars increasingly drop, according to Karen Pechilis, the old premises and the language of "radical otherness, monotheism and reform of orthodoxy" for the Bhakti movement. Many scholars now characterise the emergence of Bhakti in medieval India as a revival, reworking and recontextualization of the central themes of Vedic traditions.

== See also ==
- Dasa Sahitya
- Ekasarana Dharma
- Protestant work ethic
- Puja (Hinduism)
- Shaiva Siddhanta

== Sources ==
- Fowler, Jeaneane D. (2012). The Bhagavad Gita: A Text and Commentary for Students. Sussex Academic Press. ISBN 978-1-84519-346-1.
- Hawley, John (2015). A Storm of Songs: India and the Idea of the Bhakti Movement. Harvard University Press. ISBN 978-0-674-18746-7.
- Iwao, Shima (June–September 1988). "The Vithoba Faith of Maharashtra: The Vithoba Temple of Pandharpur and Its Mythological Structure" (PDF). Japanese Journal of Religious Studies. 15 (2–3). Nanzan Institute for Religion and Culture: 183–197. ISSN 0304-1042. Archived from the original (PDF) on 26 March 2009.
- Lorenzen, David (1995). Bhakti Religion in North India: Community Identity and Political Action. State University of New York Press. ISBN 978-0-7914-2025-6.
- Pechilis Prentiss, Karen (2014). The Embodiment of Bhakti. Oxford University Press. ISBN 978-0-19-535190-3.
- Schomer, Karine; McLeod, W. H., eds. (1987). The Sants: Studies in a Devotional Tradition of India. Motilal Banarsidass. ISBN 9788120802773.
