= Vishnudas Nama =

Classical Marathi saint-poet (16th-century CE)

Vishnudas Nama was a 16th-century Marathi saint-poet. He is best known for composing an adaptation of the Mahabharata in Marathi, alongside various devotional verses, narrative poems, and instructional works. Scholars hold differing perspectives regarding his precise background, identity, and sectarian affiliations.

== Scholarly views and identity ==
Scholarly consensus on the biography and identity of Vishnudas Nama remains divided, giving rise to several hypotheses:

- Y. K. Deshpande proposed that Vishnudas Nama may have belonged to the Mahanubhava sect.
- J. R. Ajgaonkar conjectured that he was identical to Nama Pathak.
- V. L. Bhave posited that he was a second poet named Namdev who lived during or shortly before the era of Eknath.
- G. K. Chandorkar argued that Vishnudas Nama and Nama Krishnadas were the same person.
- L. R. Pangarkar considered him to be a tailor (shimpi) and devotee of Vithoba active during Eknath's period.
- Dr. Sarojini Shende, in her doctoral thesis on Vishnudas Nama and his literary works, stated that he does not appear to belong to any specific sect or religious tradition. She posited that he may have been a Brahmin active between Shaka 1502 (1580 CE) and Shaka 1555 (1633 CE), and distinguished him from Saint Namdev. She also noted that although certain chapters of his Mahabharata were written in the secret script of the Mahanubhavas, there is no conclusive evidence to confirm he was a Mahanubhava practitioner.
- B. D. Satoskar, in his study Gomantakiya Marathi Sahityache Shilpakar (Volume 1), cited research by Prof. A. K. Priolkar and Pandurang Pissurlencar indicating that a saint-poet named Vishnudas Nama lived in Goa during the 16th century. A substantial quantity of religious literature under the name "Nama" was confiscated by Portuguese authorities in Goa and taken to Lisbon. However, Satoskar noted a strong likelihood that the Maharashtrian Vishnudas Nama and the Goan Vishnudas Nama were two distinct individuals.

== Literary works ==
=== Marathi Mahabharata ===
Vishnudas Nama authored a full Marathi adaptation of the Mahabharata, comprising approximately 13,500 ovi verses. Rather than strictly translating the original epic, he omitted numerous classical subplots and incorporated original narratives as well as tales popular among the contemporary public. He also synthesized narrative elements from different parvas (books) to form new sub-episodes while maintaining the overall framework of the original epic.

=== Other compositions ===
In addition to his Mahabharata, a wide range of narrative poems (akhyanas), devotional songs, and short compositions by Vishnudas Nama are extant, including Tulshi Akhyan, Ekadashi Mahatmya, Mhalsena Katha, Draupadi Swayamvar, Kapota Akhyan, Shuka Akhyan, Harishchandra Akhyan, an miscellaneous abhangas and padas.

He also composed Budhabavani, a poem intended to impart practical moral and social instruction. The opening letter of each verse in this work follows a sequence based on the sacred phrase "Om Namah Siddham" followed by 16 vowels and consonants. Additionally, he authored lighthearted spiritual poetry containing elements of humour.

He also used pen names like Vaishampayana and Parameshvaraco Sharanagat Nama, authored Bhishmaparva and Adiparva, transliterations of which are found in the public library of Braga in northern Portugal.

== Devotional tradition ==
Vishnudas Nama composed a widely recognized devotional abhanga dedicated to Vithoba, which begins with the line "Yei vo Vithale maje mauliye". In Goa, where it is customary during Ganesh Chaturthi festivities to sing devotional songs for Shiva and Vishnu alongside Ganesha, this composition is traditionally performed as a Chaturthi Aarti.
