= Narsi, Hingoli =

Village in Maharashtra

Narsi (Hingoli)
- Village
- Location in Maharashtra, India Narsi (Hingoli) (India)
- Coordinates: 19.79908°N 77.1476°E
- Country: India
- State: Maharashtra
- District: Hingoli

Government
  - Type: Gram panchayat

Population (2011)
  - Total: 5,992
- Demonym: Nurshikar

Languages
  - Official: Marathi, Deccani Urdu (Urdu)
- Time zone: UTC+5:30 (IST)
- PIN: 431513
- Telephone code: 02456
- Vehicle registration: MH-38

Narsi (Hingoli) is a village in Hingoli taluka of Hingoli district of Indian state of Maharashtra. It is 17 km away from Hingoli. It is known as the birthplace of the Varkari saint and poet Namdev. Earlier village was known as Nurshi (Bamani).

== Demography ==
According to the 2011 Census of India, Narsi had 1160 households and a population of 5,992, of which 3,071 were males and 2,921 were females. The Average Sex Ratio was 933, which was higher than the Maharashtra state average of 929. The literacy rate was 79%, compared to 82.95% across Maharashtra. The male literacy rate was 87% and the female literacy rate was 71%. Schedule Castes comprised 10% of the population and Schedule Tribes were 3.2%.

== Sant Namdev Sansthan Narsi ==
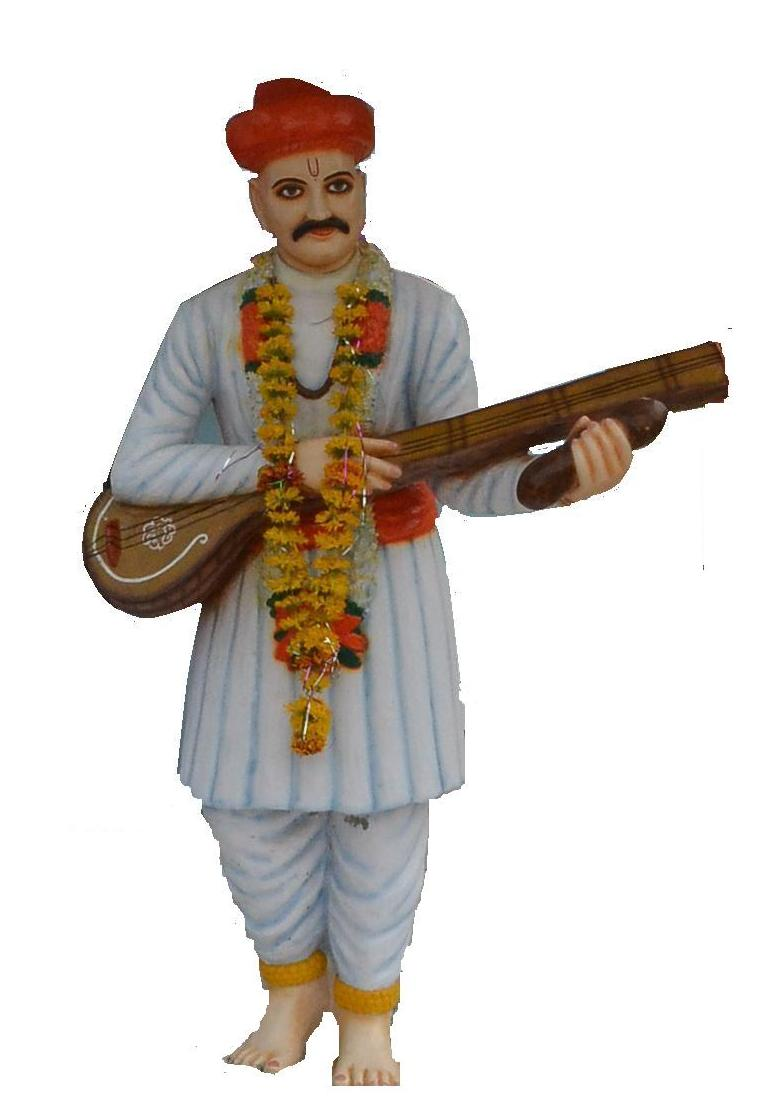
Saint Namdev

Narsi is the birthplace of the 13th-century Varkari saint Namdev. The village has a temple dedicated to him, called Sant Namdev Sansthan Narsi. Namdev, being an important figure in Sikhism, means that both Hindu and Sikh followers visit the temple. An annual fair is also held at Narsi. The Government of Maharashtra has declared Narsi as a holy place and is developing it as a religious tourist hub. Sikh followers are constructing a gurudwara along with a memorial of Namdev.
