= Gangasati =

Medieval Gujarati saint poet

Gangasati was a medieval saint poet of bhakti tradition of western India who composed several devotional songs in Gujarati language.

== Biography ==
Now authentic information regarding her life is available in the well researched book "GANGASATI, PANBAI ane KAHALSINHJI - SANSODHAN PRERAK " by MAJBUTSINHJI JADEJA (IPS) Retd. Her songs and life story were chiefly transmitted by oral traditions. According to traditional accounts, she was born in Sarvaiya(kshatriya Yadav clan of southern Saurashtra) Rajput family in Saurashtra district Bhavnagar, taluka jesar village Rajpara Gujarat state of India circa 12th to 14th century. She married Kahalsang Gohil or Kalubha Gohil of Samdhiala village near present-day Bhavnagar. He was a follower of Nijiya tradition of Bhakti Movement. The couple was religious and their home became centre of devotional activities which was small to house number of sadhus (ascetics) and people visiting. They moved to farm and built a hut where they continued their religious activities. According to traditional account, to prove his spiritual powers, Kalubha once resurrected a cow but later he regretted and decided to take samadhi and end his life. Gangasati urged him to let her take samadhi too but he refused and instructed her to wait until she had perfected Panbai in path of devotion. She agreed and composed devotional songs, bhajans, one per day for fifty two days to teach Panbai, the path of devotion. She took samadhi thereafter.

== Bhajans ==
She composed these bhajans each with a theme and spiritual teaching like importance and grace of Guru, life of devotee, nature and words of Bhakti. They are composed as they are instructed to Panbai. Notably these bhajans do not mention any traditional Hindu deity but god in general, without any form or attributes. They reflect different aspects of way of spiritual attainment. Her bhajans are still popular in Saurashtra and are traditionally sung by devotional singers.

== Popular culture ==
In 1979, a film Gangasati, directed by Dinesh Rawal, based on traditional account of her life was produced in Gujarati.

== See also ==
- List of Gujarati-language writers
