= Namdev =

Hindu Bhakti Saint (1270–1350)

Sant Namdev Maharaj
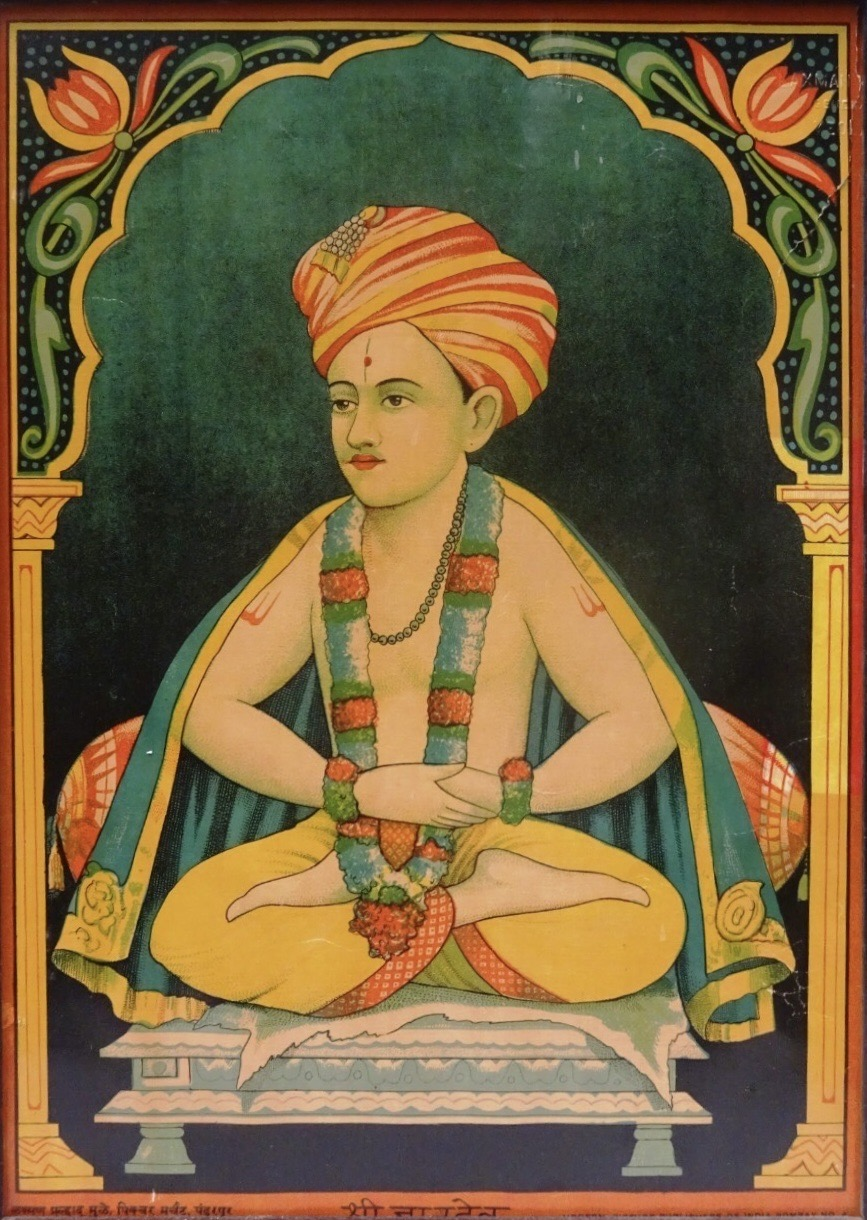
- Oleograph of Namdev, Bombay, c. 1920

Personal life
- Born: c. 26 October 1270 CE Narsi, Bamani, Yadava Dynasty, Currently Maharashtra, India
- Died: c. 3 July 1350 CE Pandharpur Bahmani Sultanate, Currently Maharashtra, India
- Notable work: Abhanga devotional poetry

Religious life
- Religion: Hinduism
- Philosophy: Varkari

Namdev (Pronunciation: [naːmdeʋ]), also transliterated as Nam Dayv, Namdeo, Namadeva, (traditionally, c. 26 October 1270 – c. 3 July 1350) was a Marathi Vaishnava saint from Narsi, Hingoli, Maharashtra, Medieval India within the Varkari tradition of Hinduism. He was a devotee of the deity Vithoba of Pandharpur.

The details of Namdev's life are unclear. He is the subject of many miracle-filled hagiographies composed centuries after he died. Scholars find these biographies to be inconsistent and contradictory.

Namdev was influenced by Vaishnavism and became widely known in India for his devotional songs set to music (Bhajan-Kirtans). His philosophy on Brahman contains both nirguna brahman and saguna brahman elements, with Vedanta themes. Namdev's legacy is remembered in modern times in the Varkari tradition, along with those of other gurus, with masses of people walking together in biannual pilgrimages to Pandharpur in Maharashtra. He is also recognised in the North Indian traditions of the Dadu Panthis, Kabir Panthis and Sikhs.

Some hymns of Namdev are included in the Guru Granth Sahib.

== Life ==
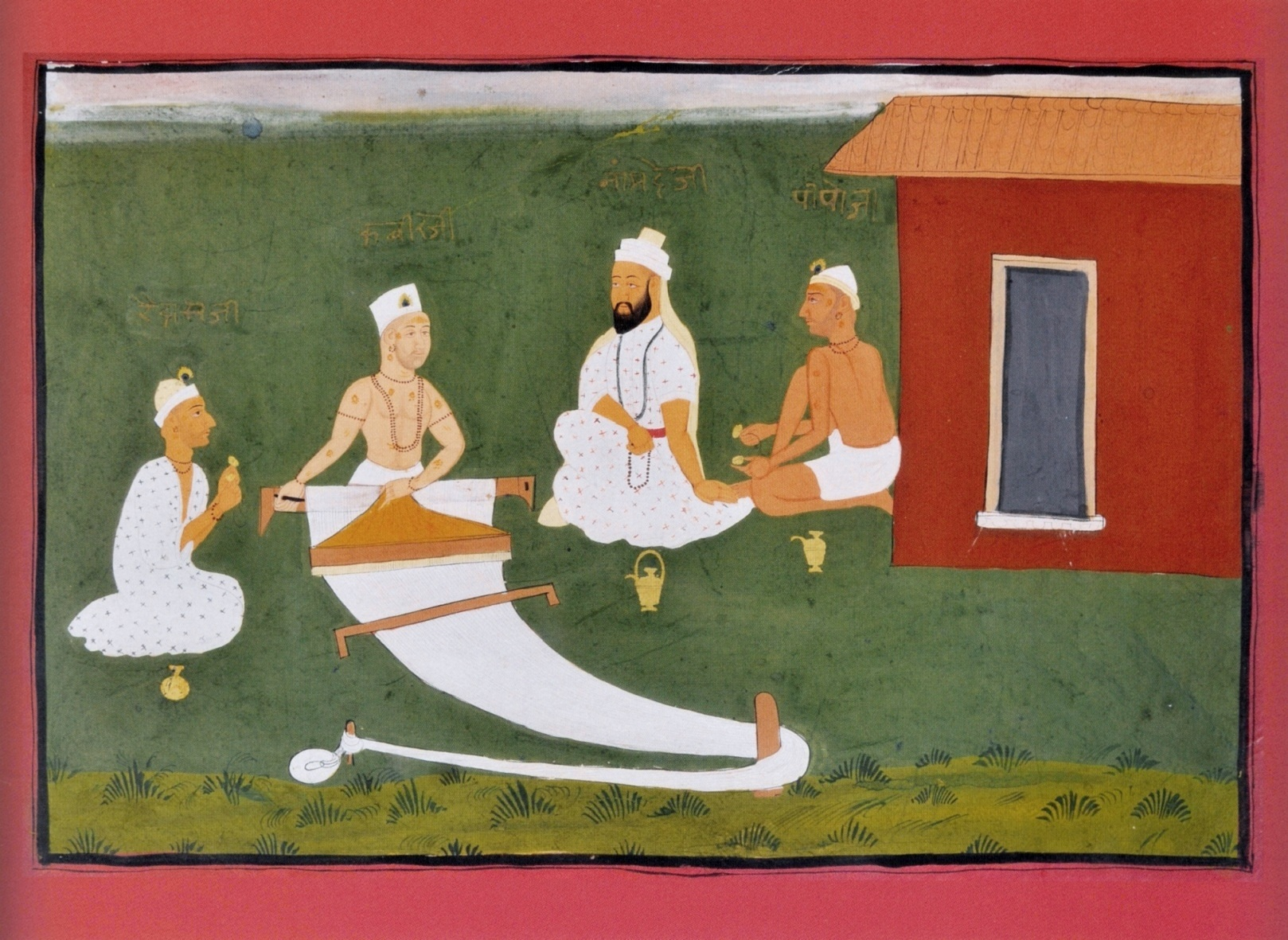
Namdev (second from right) with other bhagats of Hinduism: Ravidas, Kabir and Pipa.

Details of the life of Namdev are vague. His family name was believed to be as Relekar which is common in Bhavsar and Namdev Shimpi caste. He is traditionally believed to have lived between 1270 and 1350 but S. B. Kulkarni has suggested that 1207-1287 is more likely, based on textual analysis. Some scholars date him to around 1425 and another, R. Bharadvaj, proposes 1309-1372. He is, according to Christian Novetzke, "one of the most prominent voices in the historical study of Maharashtrian Sant figures". His well-known and first miracle is that, in childhood, he got an idol of Lord Vitthal to drink milk.

Namdev was married to Rajai and had a son, Vitha, both of whom wrote about him, as did his mother, Gonai. Contemporary references to him by a disciple, a potter, a guru and other close associates also exist. There are no references to him in the records and inscriptions of the then-ruling family and the first non-Varkari noting of him appears possibly to be in the Leela Charitra, a Mahanubhava-sect biography dating from 1278. Smrtisthala, a later Mahanubhava text from around 1310, may also possibly refer to him; after that, there are no references until a bakhar of around 1538. (Note: There was a revival of interest in the Marathi-language bhakti movement, of which Namdev had been a part, in the 16th century following the collapse of the Vijayanagara Empire.)

According to Mahipati, a hagiographer of the 18th century, Namdev's parents were Damashet and Gonai, a childless elderly couple whose prayers for parenthood were answered and involved him being found floating down a river. As with various other details of his life, elements such as this may have been invented to sidestep issues that might have caused controversy. In this instance, the potential controversy was that of caste or, more specifically, his position in the Hindu varna system of ritual ranking. He was born into what is generally recognised as a Shudra caste, variously recorded as shimpi (tailor) in the Marathi language and as Chhipa, Chhimpa, Chhimba, shimpi, chimpi (calico-printer) in northern India. His followers in Maharashtra and northern India who are from those communities prefer to claim their origin as Kshatriya. However, both Shimpi and Chimpi castes belong to the Shudra varna, which is only one rung above the castes that were considered untouchables.

There are contrary traditions concerning his birthplace, with some people believing that he was born at Narsi Bahmani, on the Krishna River in Marathwada and others preferring somewhere near to Pandharpur on the Bhima river. that he was himself a calico-printer or tailor and that he spent much of his life in Punjab. The Lilacaritra suggests, however, that Namdev was a cattle-thief who was devoted to and assisted Vithoba. (Note: The Mahanubhavs and Varkaris were antagonists and this is often reflected in their writings, especially in those of the former sect. Novetzke discusses the chronological and philological difficulties relating to the purported origins of the Lilacaritra and the traditionally-accepted year of birth and spelling of Namdev.)

A friendship between Namdev and Jñāneśvar, a yogi-saint, has been posited at least as far back as circa 1600 CE when Nabhadas, a hagiographer, noted it in his Bhaktamal. Jñāneśvar, also known as Jñāndev, never referred to Namdev in his writings but perhaps had no cause to do so; Novetzke notes that "Jnandev's songs generally did not concern biography or autobiography; the historical truth of their friendship is beyond my ken to determine and has remained an unsettled subject in Marathi scholarship for over a century."

Namdev is generally considered by Sikhs to be a holy man (bhagat), many of whom came from lower castes and so also attracted attention as social reformers. Such men, who comprised both Hindus and Muslims, traditionally wrote devotional poetry in a style that was acceptable to the Sikh belief system.

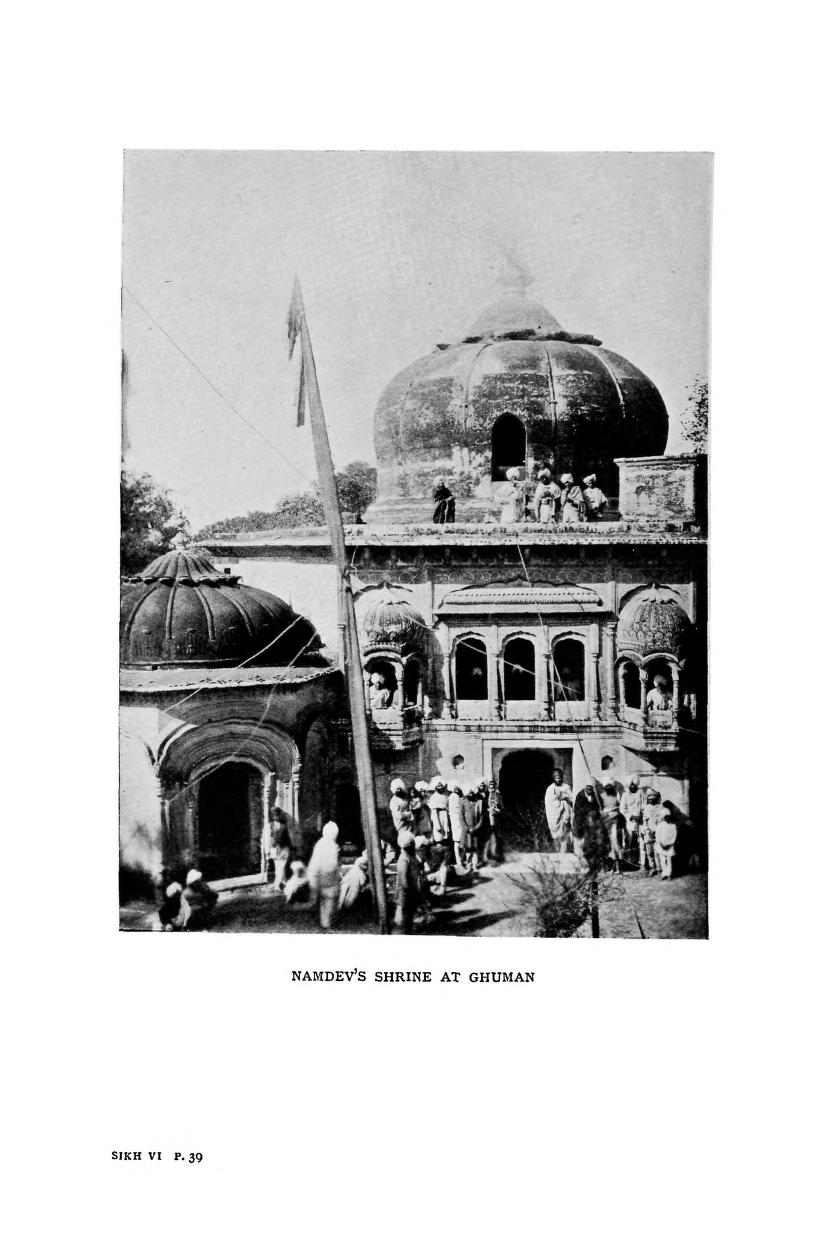
Photograph of the shrine of Bhagat Namdev in Ghuman, as published in 'The Sikh Religion' (1909)

A tradition in Maharashtra is that Namdev died at the age of eighty in 1350 CE. Sikh tradition maintains that his death place was the Punjabi village of Ghuman, although this is not universally accepted. Aside from a shrine there that marks his death, there are monuments at the other claimant places, being Pandharpur and the nearby Narsi Bahmani.

=== Reliability of hagiographies ===
Scholars note that many miracles and specifics about Namdev's life appear only in manuscripts written centuries after Namdev's death. The birth theory with Namdev floating down a river, is first found in Mahipati's Bhaktavijay composed around 1762, and is absent in all earlier biographies of Namdev. Mahipati's biography of Namdev adds numerous other miracles, such as buildings rotating and sun rising in the west to show respect to Namdev.

The earliest surviving Hindi and Rajasthani biographies from about 1600 only mention a few miracles performed by Namdev. In Namdev biographies published after 1600 through the end of the 20th century, new life details and more miracles increasingly appear with the passage of time. The earliest biographies never mention the caste of Namdev, and his caste appears for the first time in manuscripts with statements from Ravidas and Dhana in early 17th century. Namdev's Immaculate Conception miracle mentioned in later era manuscripts, adds Novetzke, is a story found regularly for other sants in India. The Namdev biographies in medieval manuscripts are inconsistent and contradictory, feeding questions of their reliability.

== Work ==
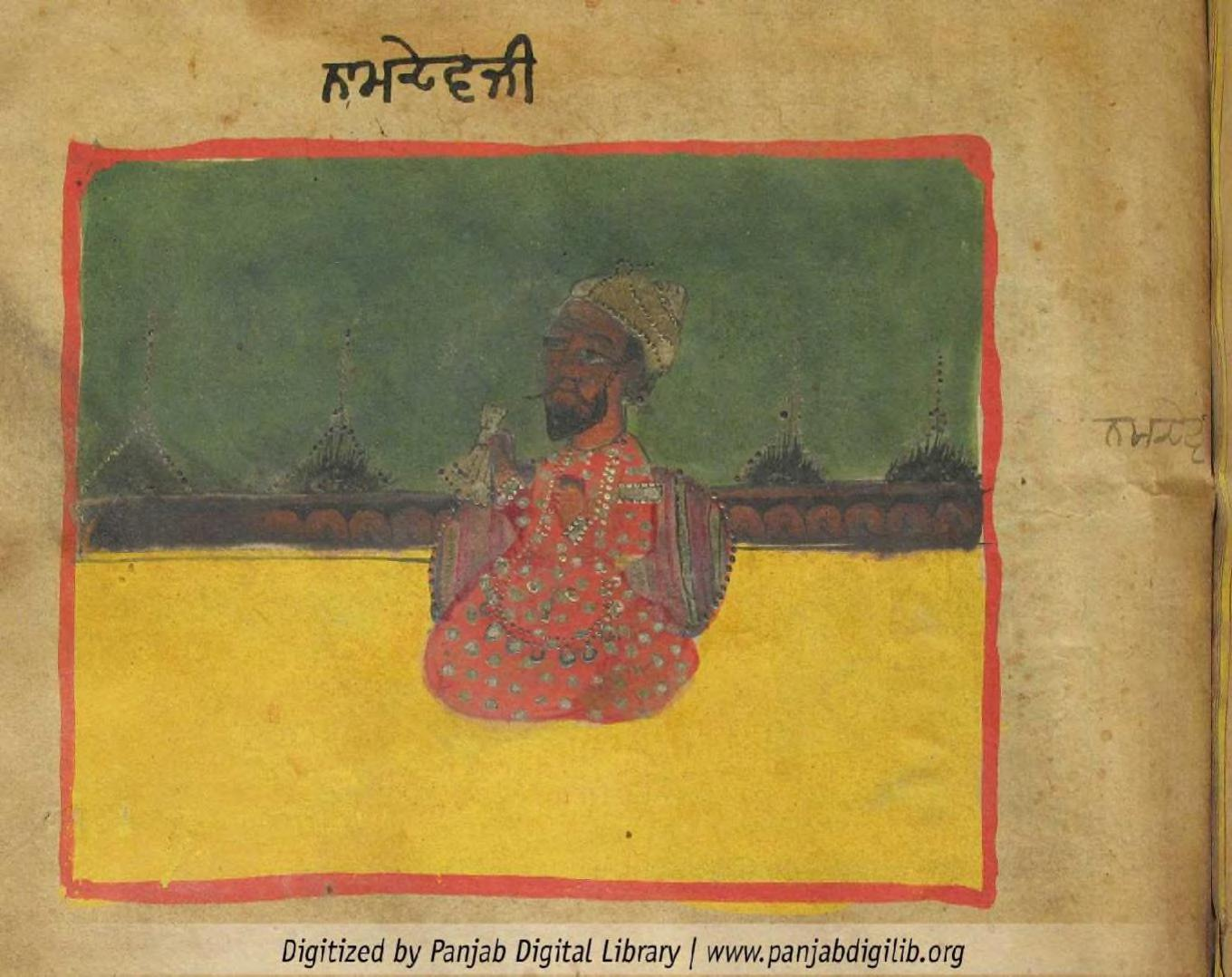
Painting of Bhagat Namdev, from a folio within an illustrated manuscript of the Prem Ambodh Pothi

The literary works of Namdev were influenced by Vaishnava philosophy and a belief in Vithoba. Along with the Jñānēśvarī, a sacred work of Jñānēśvar, and of Bhakti movement teacher-writers such as Tukaram, the writings of Namdev form the basis of the beliefs held by the Varkari sect of Hinduism. He was thus among those responsible for disseminating the monotheistic Varkari faith that had emerged first in Karnataka in the mid-to-late 12th century and then spread to Pandharpur in Maharashtra.

Namdev and Jñānēśvar used the Marathi language to convey their beliefs. Namdev's style was to compose simply worded praise for Vithoba and to use a melodic device called samkirtana, both of which were accessible to common people. Shima Iwao says that "He taught that all can be saved equally, without regard to caste, through devotion (bhakti) to Vithoba" and that he greatly influenced groups of people who were forbidden by the Brahmin elite from studying the Vedas, such as members of the Shudra and untouchable communities.

The earliest anthological record of Namdev's works occurs in the Guru Granth Sahib, the Sikh scriptures compiled in 1604, although Novetzke notes that while the manuscript records of Namdev mostly date from the 17th and 18th centuries, there exists a manuscript from 1581 that presents a rarely recounted variant version of Namdev's Tirthavli, a Marathi-language autobiographical piece. It is evident that the Guru Granth Sahib ji record is an accurate rendition of what Namdev wrote: the oral tradition probably accounts significantly for the changes and additions that appear to have been made by that time. The numerous subsequently produced manuscripts also show variant texts and additions that are attributed to him. Of around 2500 abhangs that were credited to him and written in the Marathi language, perhaps only 600 - 700 are authentic. The surviving manuscripts are geographically dispersed and of uncertain provenance.

=== Bhajans ===
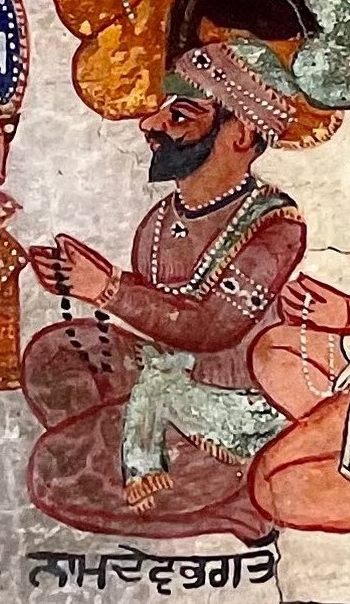
Detail of Bhagat Namdev from a Sikh fresco, circa mid-19th century

Namdev's padas are not mere poems, according to Callewaert and Lath. Like other Bhakti movement sants, Namdev composed bhajans, that is songs meant to be sung to music. A Bhajan literally means "a thing enjoyed or shared". Namdev's songs were composed to be melodious and carry a spiritual message. They built on one among the many ancient Indian traditions for making music and singing. Namdev's bhajans, note Callewaert and Lath, deployed particular species of Raag, used Bhanita (or Chhap, a stamp of the composer's name inside the poem, in his case Nama), applied a Tek (or dhruva, repeated refrain) and a meter than helps harmonise the wording with the musical instrument, all according to Sangita manuals refined from the 8th to 13th centuries.

The musical genre of Namdev's literary works was a form of Prabandha – itself a very large and rich genre that includes dhrupad, thumri, tappa, geet, bhajan and other species. In some species of Indian music, it is the music that dominates while words and their meaning are secondary. In contrast, in Namdev's bhajan the spiritual message in the words has a central role, and the structure resonates with the singing and music. The songs and music that went with Namdev's works were usually transmitted verbally across generations, in a guru-sisya-parampara (teacher-student tradition), within singing gharanas (family-like musical units).

Callewaert and Lath state that, "each single song of Namdev is a musical and textual unit and this unit is the basis for textual considerations". The unit contained Antaras, which are the smallest independent unit within that can be shifted around, dropped or added, without affecting the harmony or meaning, when a bhajan is being sung with music. In Namdev's songs, the dominant pattern is Caturasra, or an avarta with the 4x4 square pattern of musical matras (beat).

=== Compilations ===
Namdev's work is known for abhangs, a genre of hymn poetry in India. His poems were transmitted from one generation to the next within singing families, and memory was the only recording method in the centuries that followed Namdev's death. The repertoires grew, because the artists added new songs to their repertoire. The earliest surviving manuscripts of songs attributed to Namdev, from these singing families, are traceable to the 17th century. A diverse collection of these manuscripts exist, which have been neither compiled nor archived successfully in a single critical edition. The state Government of Maharashtra made an effort and compiled Namdev's work from various manuscripts into the Sri Namdev Gatha in 1970.

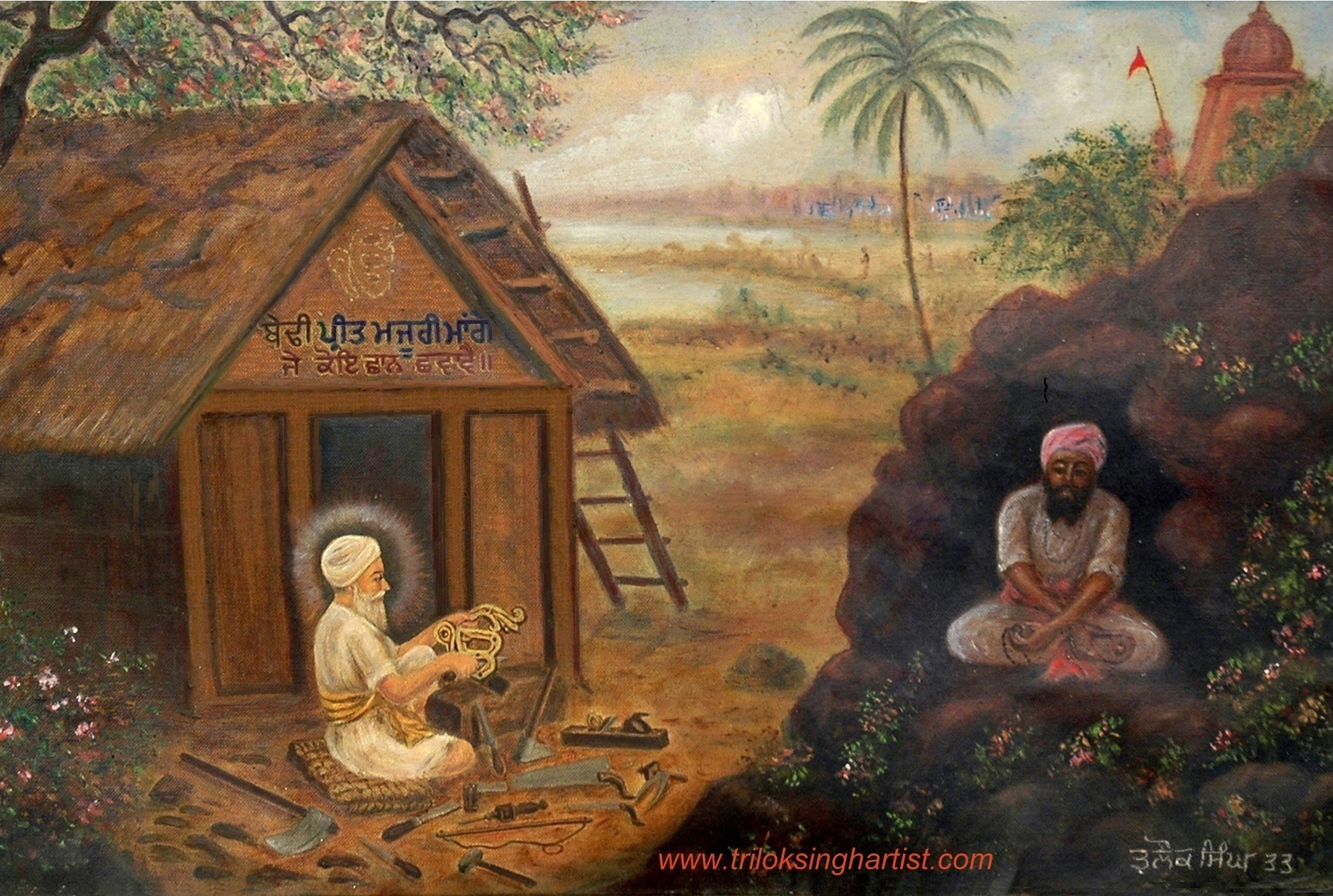
Oil painting work of Trilok Singh Chitarkar from 1933 depicting bhagat Namdev in his hut

The Adi Granth of Sikhism includes a compilation of 61 songs of Namdev. However, of these only 25 are found in surviving Namdev-related manuscripts of Rajasthan. Winand Callewaert suggests that Namdev's poems in the Adi Granth and the surviving Rajasthani manuscripts are considerably different musically and morphologically, but likely to have evolved from a very early common source.

=== Anamnetic authorship ===
Of thousands of Abhang poems credited to Namdev, 600 - 700 are probably authentic. The other poems are attributed to Namdev, in a phenomenon Novetzke calls, "anamnetic authorship". The later compositions and their authors hid the true authorship purposefully and collectively over the 14th to 18th centuries, a period described in Maharashtra culture as the dark age. This was a period of Muslim conquest and repression of Hindus under the Delhi Sultanate and the Mughal Empire. The literary works not composed by Namdev, but attributed to Namdev were partly a product of this historical suffering and political situation in Deccan region of India. Some of the poetries of another Poet named Vishnudas Nama Dev who lived in 15th century are also attributed to this Namadev, the Saint. This includes the popular Marathi Aartis of Vithoba "Yuge Atthavis" & "Yei O Vitthale".

== Philosophy ==
Namdev was influenced by Vaishnavite philosophy. His poems sometimes invoked Vithoba, sometimes Vishnu-Krishna as Govind-Hari, but in the larger context of Rama, which states Ronald McGregor, was not referring to the hero described in the Hindu epic Ramayana, but to a pantheistic Ultimate Being. Namdev's view of Rama can be visualised, adds McGregor, "only as the one true, or real Teacher of man (satguru)". However, this is an observation based on hymns for which Namdev is not definitively known to the author, and might well be interpolated. For example, the following hymn talks about worshipping One Omnipresent God rather than Hindu deities Rama or Shiva.

O Pandit, I saw your great god Shiva, riding along on a white bull. In the merchant's house, a banquet was prepared for him - he killed the merchant's son. O Pandit, I saw your Raam Chand coming too; he lost his wife, fighting a war against Raawan. The Hindu is sightless; the Muslim has only one eye. The spiritual teacher is wiser than both of them. The Hindu worships at the temple, the Muslim at the mosque. Naam Dayv serves that Lord, who is not limited to either the temple or the mosque.

— Namdev, Guru Granth Sahib 874-875

One stone is lovingly decorated, while another stone is walked upon. If one is a god, then the other must also be a god. Says Naam Dayv, I serve the Lord.

— Namdev, Guru Granth Sahib 525

Indian traditions attribute varying theosophical views to Namdev. In north India, Namdev is considered as a nirguna bhakta, in Marathi culture he is considered a saguna bhakta.

In Namdev literature, devotion as the path to liberation is considered superior to alternative paths. Novetzke states that the envisioned devotion is not one way from the devotee to Vishnu, but it is bidirectional, such that "Krishna (Vishnu) is Namdev's slave, and Namdev is Vishnu's slave". To Namdev, mechanical rituals are futile, pilgrimage to holy places is pointless, deep meditation and loving mutual devotion is what matters. Namdev and other sant poets of India "were influenced by the monist view of the ultimate being (Brahman)", which was expressed, in vernacular language, as the loving devotion not of a specific deity but to this ultimate, according to McGregor. Namdev's songs suggested the divine is within oneself, its non-duality, its presence and oneness in everyone and everything. (Note: Callewaert and Lath translate Hindi Pada 20 of Namdev as, I worship only God-within, nothing else, says Namdev.) (Note: Callewaert and Lath translate Namdev's Hindi Pada 6 as, Rama speaks, Rama alone speaks, Who can speak without Rama, brother? The elephant and the ant, are one, being both dust. These are the vessels, many and varied. The worm and the moth, whatever moves or is still, everything is filled with Rama.)

In Namdev's literary works, summarises Klaus Witz, as with virtually every Bhakti movement poet, the "Upanishadic teachings form an all-pervasive substratum, if not a basis. We have here a state of affairs that has no parallel in the West. Supreme Wisdom, which can be taken as basically nontheistic and as an independent wisdom tradition (not dependent on the Vedas), appears fused with highest level of bhakti and with highest level of God realization."

== Legacy ==
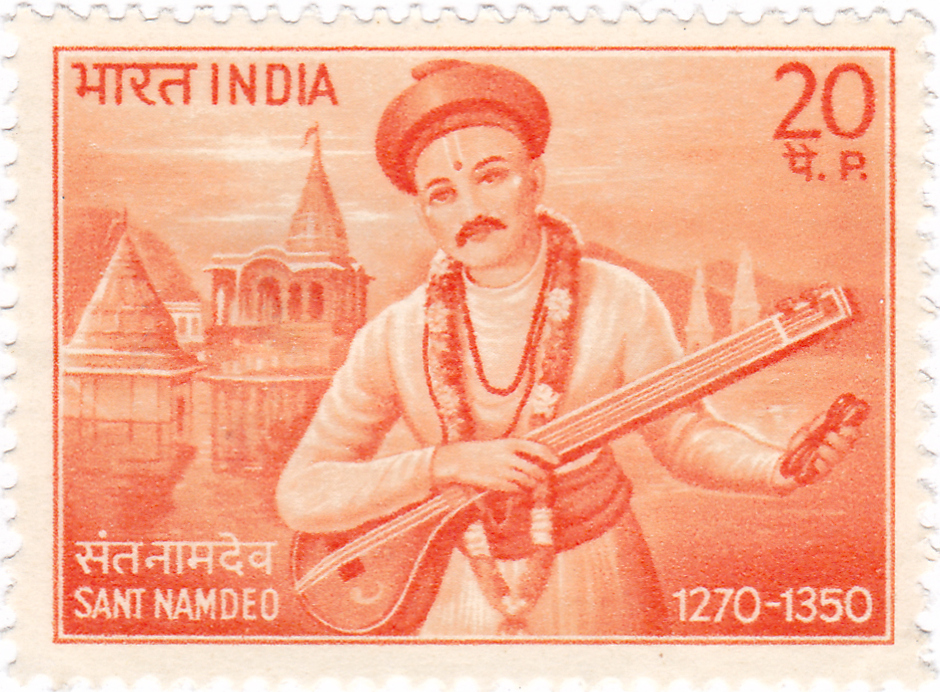
Namdev on a 1970 stamp of India

Along with the works of sants such as Jnanesvar and Tukaram, the writings of Namdev are at the foundation of beliefs held by the Varkari sect of Hinduism. He was among those responsible for disseminating the Vithoba faith that had emerged first in the 12th century. Namdev used the Marathi language to compose his poetry, which made it accessible to the wider public. Namdev's simple words of devotion and his use melody appealed to common people. This helped spread his message and songs widely. Namdev thus played a role, states McGregor, in shaping the religious base for the "premodern and modern culture of north India".

Namdev attracted individuals from diverse classes and castes during community-driven bhajan singing sessions. His companions during worship sessions included Kanhopatra (a dancing girl), Sena (a barber), Savata (a gardener), Chokhamela (an untouchable), Janabai (a maid), Gora (a potter), Narahari (a goldsmith) and Jñāneśvar (also known as Dnyandev, a Brahmin). The close friendship between Namdev and the influential Jnanesvar, a Brahmin yogi-saint, is mentioned in Bhaktamal. The songs of Namdev, also called kirtans, use the term loka, which Novetzke states is a reference to "we the people" and the "human world" as a social force.

Namdev is considered one of the five revered gurus in the Dadupanth tradition within Hinduism, the other four being Dadu, Kabir, Ravidas and Hardas. Dadupanthi Hindus thrived in Rajasthan, creating and compiling Bhakti poems including one of the largest collection of Namdev's songs. They were also among the warrior-ascetics of Rajput heritage who became a widespread phenomena in the 17th- and 18th-century North India, and were sannyasis who participated in armed resistance to the Islamic Mughal empire, inspired by their Nath yogi heritage and five revered gurus. Like Dadupanth, another north Indian warrior ascetic group, the Niranjani Sampraday tradition within Hinduism reveres Namdev as a holy person. The Niranjani Vani, which is their scripture just like the scriptures of Dadu Panthi and Sikhs, includes poetry of Namdev, and is dated to be from the 17th and 18th centuries.

Namdev is one of the revered holy men in Sikhism as well. He is mentioned in Guru Granth Sahib, where Novetzke notes, "Namdev is remembered as having been summoned to confront a Sultan." There is a controversy among scholars if the Namdev hymns recorded in the Guru Granth of Sikhs were composed by the Marathi Namdev, or a different sant whose name was also Namdev.

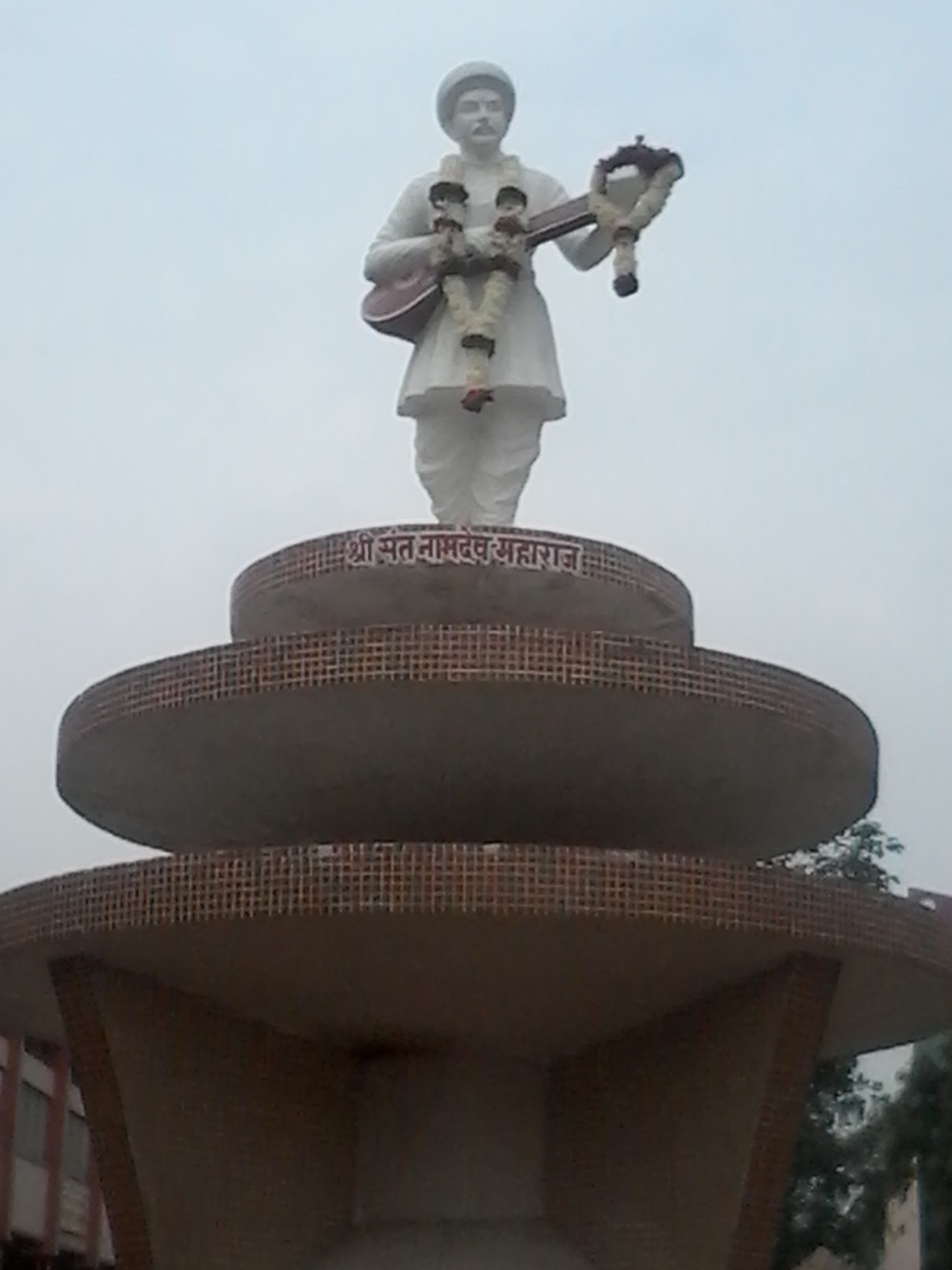
Monument dedicated to Namdev in Shegaon, Maharashtra

Namdev's legacy continues through the biannual pilgrimage to Pandharpur, near Bhima river, in Maharashtra. His paduka (footprints) are among those of revered sants that Varkari communities from various parts of Maharashtra carry with a palkhi (palanquin) to the Vithoba temple in Pandharpur, every year in modern times. Namdev composed bhajan-kirtans are sung during the pilgrimage-related festivities.

== See also ==
- Kabir
- Guru Nanak
- Ravidas
- Bhagat Pipa
