= Rekha Pande =

Indian Historian

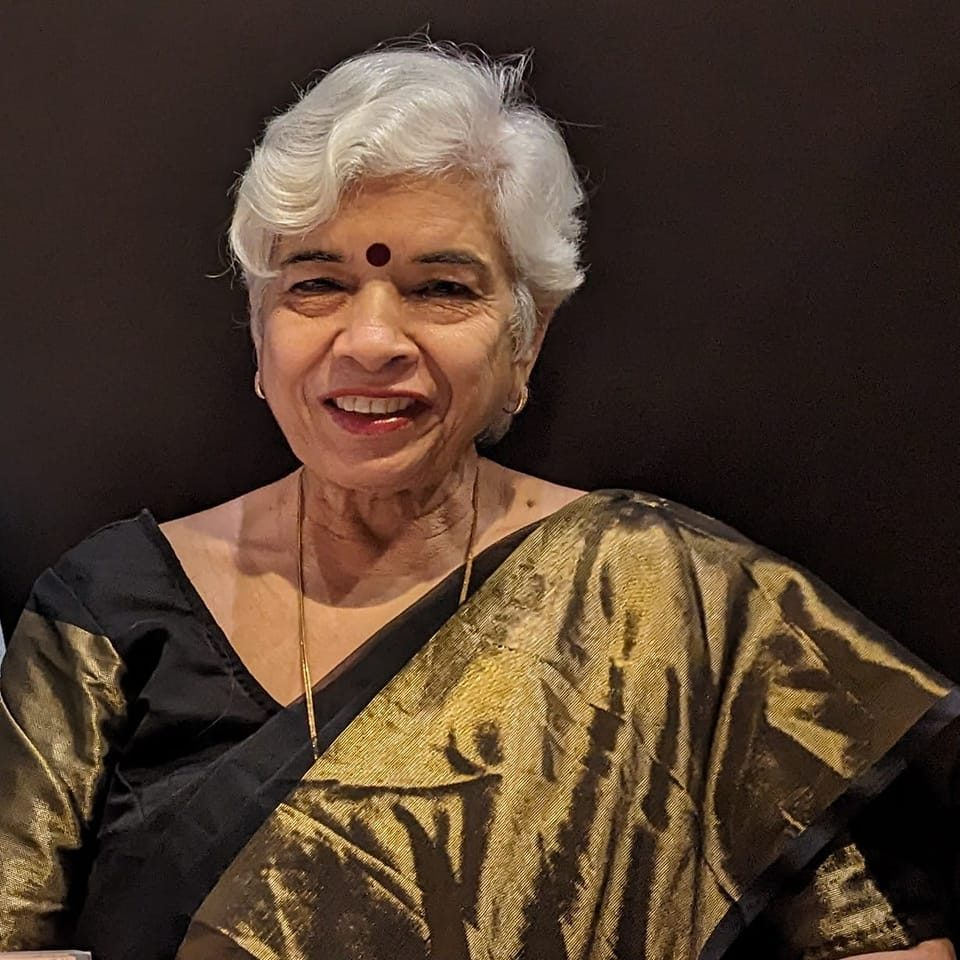
- Born: India
- Occupation: Historian and activist
- Subject: History and Women's Studies
- Notable works: Member of Mahila Samkhya Programme
- Spouse: Dr. Suresh Pande

Website
- rekhapande.indiaseed.in

Rekha Pande is a Professor of History and Gender studies. Earlier she was a Professor Emeritus at Henry Martin, an International Centre for Research, Interfaith Relations and Reconciliation, Hyderabad. She is also currently the Director of the Society for Empowerment through Environment Development (SEED). She is the former Head of the Centre for Women's Studies and the former Head of the Department of History at the University of Hyderabad, India. She has also served as a Director Centre for Women's Studies at Maulana Azad National Urdu University (MANUU), Hyderabad. As a feminist historian, Pande researches the theoretical and methodological problems of reconstructing women's history and understanding the roots of women's subordination within the South Asian context. She also attempts to examine the varied historical contexts at the regional/local levels and explain the reproduction and subordination of women at the national and global scale—in various related, albeit different, contemporary contexts. She is an academic activist also associated with the women's movement in India.

== Early life and education ==
Pande was born in Uttrakhand in the Himalayan valleys. Her earlier schooling was in different parts of the country. She studied at Holy Family High School and Kendriya Vidyalaya. She attended the University of Allahabad, studying history, English literature, and political science. After graduation, she continued to study history and obtained a PhD from Allahabad University in 1981 and joined the University of Hyderabad in 1984.

== Career ==
Rekha Pande has taught at three different universities: Allahabad University, Maulana Azad National Urdu University, and the University of Hyderabad. She has also introduced a course on India's religious and cultural heritage for four years at the International Institute of Information Technology. She is a professor of history and teaches in the Department of History. She is the former head of the Centre for Women's Studies Department at the University of Hyderabad. Before this, she was the head of the Department of History. She has been the founding member of two centres for women's studies, one at Maulana Azad National Urdu University and the other at the University of Hyderabad. She was the chair of the Women's World Congress in 2014, organized for the first time in India.

She has been the editor of the International Feminist Journal of Politics (IFJP). She edited Foreign Policy Analysis. She is on the editorial board of the academic journal Palgrave Communication, London, Palgrave Macmillan, International Feminist Journal of Politics, International Journal of Semiotics and Visual Rhetoric (IJSVR), and Current Research Journal of Social Sciences and Humanities. She was nominated as the Peace ambassador for the South Asia region by the International Women's Peace Group, Korea in 2016. She has received the Visiting Fellowship at the Institute of Birkbeck, University of London, an International Visiting Fellowship in the School of Policy Studies at the University of Bristol, U.K. Academic Fellow, University of Buffalo, USA, and an International Visiting Scholar, at Maison De Research, Paris and Visiting Professorship at the University of Artois, Arras, France.She has worked and published in the interdisciplinary area of History and Women Studies.

== Publications ==
I. Books:

1. Pande,Rekha,2024,Facets of Muslim Women in the Deccan: Echoes on Culture, Education, Work, and Health, Maryland, USA,Lexington, Bloomsbury Publishing
2. Pande, Rekha, 2023, Women’s work in the Unorganised sector: Issues of Exploitation and Globalisation in the Beedi Industry, Routledge.
3. Pande, Rekha ( with Goel, A.K, Ravulapali Madhavi, Zarina Parveen), 2023, Telangana Land and People , From 1724 to 1858 CE. Vol. III. Dr. MCR Human Resource Development Institute, SARS Foundation, Bookline Publication, Hyderabad, ISBN No. 978-81-957545-1-6
4. Pande, Rekha ( with Goel, A.K.Ravulapali Madhavi, Zarina Parveen), 2023,Telangana Land and People, From 1323 to 1724 CE, Vol. II, Dr. MCR Human Resource Development Institute, SARS Foundation, Bookline Publication, Hyderabad.
5. Pande, Rekha (with Goel, A.K, D.Satyanarayana, Ravulapali Madhavi), 2022, Telangana Land and People, From Stone Age to 1323 CE. Vol.1, Dr. MCR Human Resource Development Institute, SARS Foundation, Bookline Publication, Hyderabad.
6. Pande, Rekha (with S. Jeevanandam), 2017, Devdasis in South India – a Journey from sacred to profane spaces, Kalpaz Publications, Gyan Books, New Delhi.
7. Pande, Rekha, 2016, Sex Trafficking in South Asia with a Special Focus on India, Kalpaz Publication, Gyan Books, New Delhi.
8. Pande Rekha, 2010, Divine Sounds from the Heart, Singing unfettered in their own voices - The Bhakti Movement and its Women saints (12th to 17th century), Cambridge Scholars Publishing, U.K.
9. Religious Movements in Medieval India, Gyan Publishing House, New Delhi.
10. Pande, Rekha, 2000, (with Subhash Joshi), Gender Issues in the Police, S.V.P. National Police Academy, Hyderabad.
11. Pande, Rekha, 1998, Child Labour in Beedi Industry, Delta Publishers, Hyderabad.
12. Pande, Rekha, 1990, Succession in the Delhi Sultanate, Common Wealth Publications, New Delhi.

II. Edited Books:

1. Pande, Rekha (with Sita Vanka), (eds), 2020, Gender violence : International perspectives, Rawat Publications, Jaipur.
2. Pande, Rekha (with Sita Vanka), (eds), 2019, Gender and structural violence, Rawat Publications, Jaipur.
3. Pande, Rekha (with Sita Vanka), (eds), 2019, Gender, Law and Health: International Perspectives, Rawat Publications, Jaipur.
4. Pande, Rekha (with Sita Vanka and Bharat Chillakuri eds), 2019, Gender and Work: International Perspectives, Rawat Publications, Jaipur.
5. Pande, Rekha (with Th.P. van der Weide, ed), 2018, Handbook of Research on Multicultural Perspectives on Gender and Aging (Advances in Human and Social Aspects of Technology Series), IGI Global; Hershey, Pennsylvania, USA.
6. Pande, Rekha, 2018, Gender and History, Rawat Publication, Jaipur.
7. Pande, Rekha, (ed), 2016, Women's Studies Narratives: Travails and Triumphs, The Women Press, New Delhi.
8. Pande, Rekha, (ed), 2015, Gender Lens: Women's Issues and Perspectives, Rawat Publication, New Delhi.
9. Pande, Rekha, (with Theo P. van der Weide) ed. 2012, Globalization, Technology Diffusion and Gender Disparity: Social Impacts of ICTs, Information Science Reference, IGI Global, Hershey USA.
10. Pande, Rekha, (with Shivkumar Nalini and Mahalingam, Rema, ed), 2007, Women in Nation Building- A Multi-dimensional perspective, Panchajanya Publications, Hyderabad.
