= Barahmasa =

Poetic genre

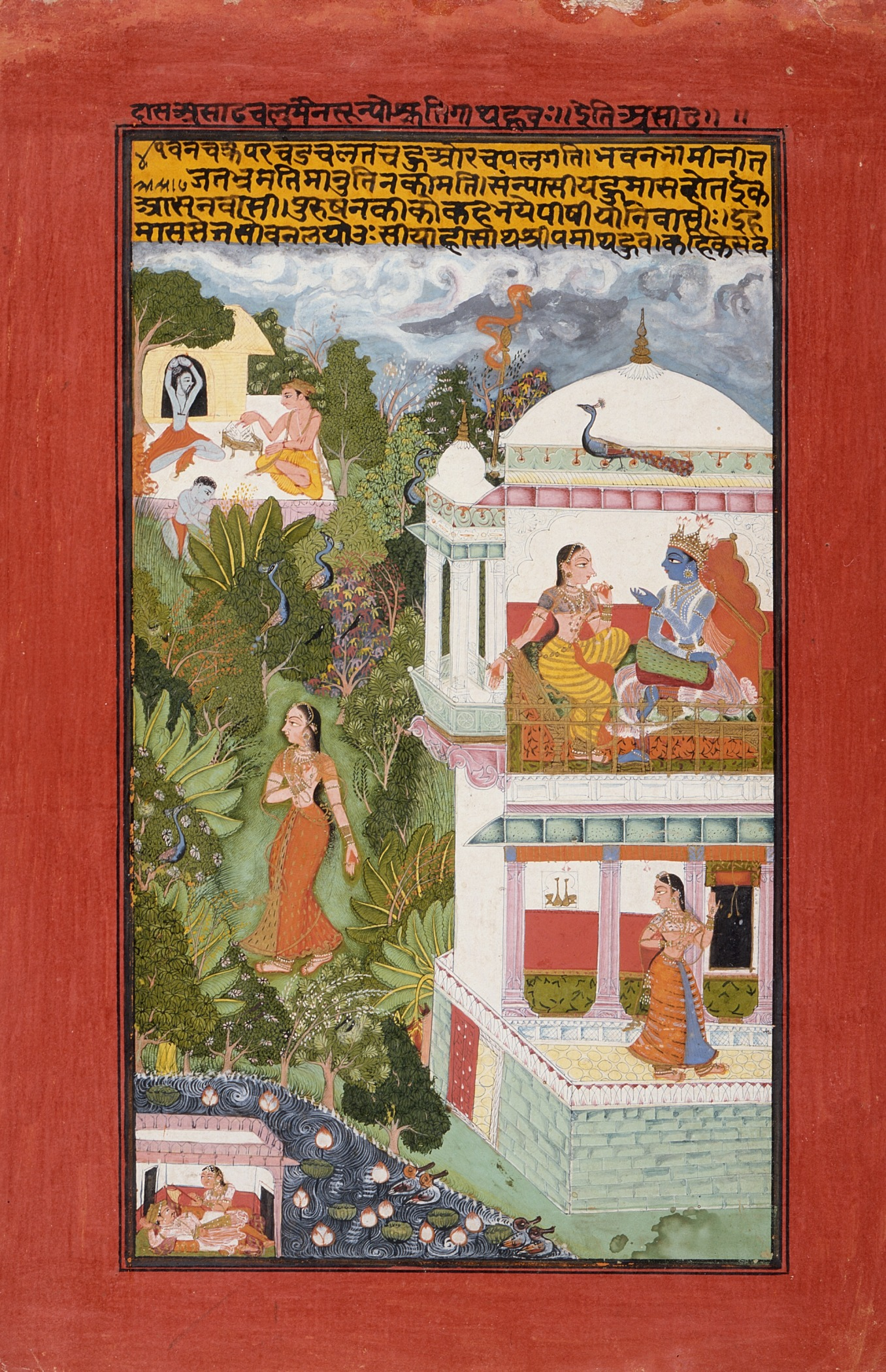
The month of Ashadha (June–July), folio from a Barahmasa painting (c. 1700–1725)

Barahmasa (lit. 'the twelve months') is a poetic genre popular in the Indian subcontinent derived primarily from the Indian folk tradition. It is usually themed around a woman longing for her absent lover or husband, describing her own emotional state against the backdrop of passing seasonal and ritual events. The progression of months (according to the Hindu lunar calendar) is a fundamental component of the genre, but the number of months is not necessarily barah (Hindi: बारह, Bhojpuri:𑂫𑂰𑂩𑂯, Urdu: بارہ) or "twelve" as similar poetic forms known as chaumasas, chaymasas and ashtamasas (cycles of four, six, and eight months, respectively) also exist in the same lineage of folk traditions.

Although originally an oral tradition, the genre was incorporated into longer poems, epics and narratives by a number of Indian poets across major Modern Indo-Aryan languages including—Bhojpuri, Hindi, Urdu, Bengali, Gujarati, Rajasthani languages, Bihari languages, Punjabi etc., and can be found in the folk poetry of the tribal people too.

== Origins ==
=== Etymology ===
The word barahmasa derives from the word barah (Hindi: बारह, Bhojpuri: 𑂫𑂰𑂩𑂯 Urdu: بارہ) meaning "twelve" and masa (Bhojpuri: 𑂧𑂰𑂮, Urdu: ماہ) meaning "month". Similar cognates are employed to denote the same genre in other languages such as baromasi in Bengali.

== Literature ==
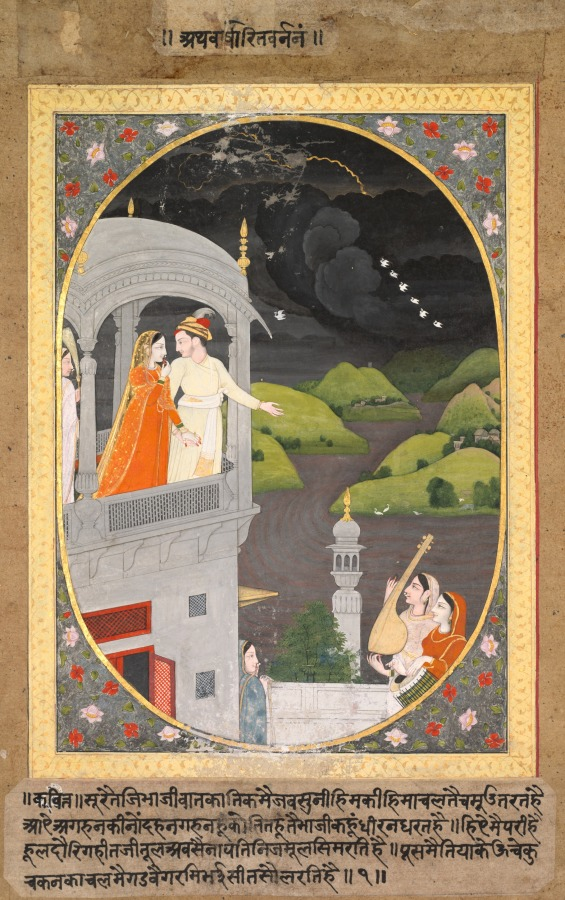
An illustration to the month of Bhadon.

=== Hindi-Urdu ===
The barahmasas, along with saṭ-ṛtu (‘six seasons’) genre, were incorporated in the Awadhi premakhyans (‘romances’), Rajasthani rasaus ('ballads') such as the Bisaldev-ras of Nalha Kavi as well as in the works of the renowned Braj Bhasha poet Keshavadas. A few devotional barahamasa attributed to Tulsidas and Surdas themed mainly around the worship of Rama-Krishna have been found too.

The barahmasas first appeared in Hindi and then gradually in Urdu as well. According to Orsini, they were "perhaps the first substantial genre in the boom in commercial publishing in north-India of the 1860s."

=== Bhojpuri ===
Barahmasa in Bhojpuri language is a folk song genre which is sung throughout the year. Theme of these songs are based on human nature of love and separation. One of the earliest form of Barahmasa is found in Gorakhnath Baani and Bharathari's writings of 11th century.

=== Bengali ===
In Bengali, baromasis were incorporated in the devotional literature known as Mangal-Kavya and Chandravati's adaptation of the Hindu epic Ramayana wherein Sita recollects her experiences with Rama through a whole year.

=== Persian ===
The earliest and the only literary barahmasa in Persian was composed by Sad-i-Salman. The poet, who lived in Lahore, was probably influenced by Indian folk conventions. But its theme is neither a woman's longing nor union of lovers, and begins with the Iranian month of Parvardin.

=== Gujarati ===
In early nineteenth century Gujarat, the poet-saint Brahmanand restructured Barahamasas and incorporated theology of Swaminarayan Sampradaya. His compositions fall under larger Krishna-bhakti poetry.

== Paintings ==
The genre was also used by artists & painting schools such as 'Bundi school of painting' to make several miniature paintings depicting different months of the year. There are about 138 Barahmasa painting in National Museum, New Delhi. Most of these paintings were belong to late 18th century to early 19th century.
