= Madeleine Biardeau =

French Indologist

Madeleine Biardeau (16 May 1922 Niort - 1 February 2010 Cherveux) was an Indologist from France.

== Early life ==
Madeleine Biardeau was born into a middle-class family of small entrepreneurs. She was educated at the Ecole normale supérieure in Sèvres, where she studied philosophy. Here, she was attracted to the Eastern spirituality and started learning Sanskrit in order to study Hindu philosophy.

== Indology ==
Curious about India, Biardeau joined the University of Travancore for two years in the 1950s, and studied Sanskrit texts with pandits. She visited India almost every year until the 1990s, and worked closely with pandits at the Deccan College (Pune) and the French Institute of Pondicherry. She visited places of worship in towns and villages, surveying people from different castes and collecting information about the various cults and rituals. Meanwhile, she also taught at the École pratique des hautes études.

She studied the philosophy contained in the Puranas and the Advaita Vedanta in detail. She translated the works of Mandana Misra, Vacaspati Misra, and Bhartṛhari into French. She wrote her doctoral dissertation on The Theory of Knowledge and the Philosophy of Speech in Classical Brahmanism in 1964 (in French)

The Hindu epics constituted a main area of Biardeau's scholarship. She translated the Ramayana of Valmiki into French (1991), in collaboration with two other scholars: Marie-Claude Porcher and Philippe Benoit. Her last major work comprised the two edited volumes of the Mahabharata published in 2002.

Biardeau retired to Cherveux in 2008, and died there in 2010.

== Bibliography ==
- Histoires de poteaux : Variations védiques autour de la Déesse hindoue, École Française d'Extrême Orient, 2005.
  - Stories about Posts: Vedic Variations around the Hindu Goddess (1994). ISBN 978-0-226-04595-5. Translated by Alf Hiltebeitel.
- L'hindouisme, anthropologie d'une civilisation, Flammarion, 1995.
  - Hinduism: The Anthropology of a Civilization (1994). ISBN 978-0-19-563389-4. Translated by Richard Nice.
- Le Mahabharata, Le Seuil, 2002. A two-edition French translation of the Mahabharata.
