= B. D. Satoskar =

Indian historian and journalist (1909–2000)

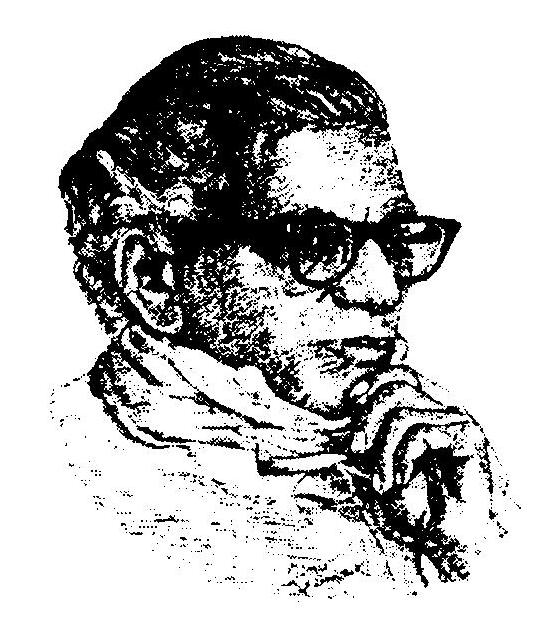
- Portrait of B. D. Satoskar
- Born: Balkrishna Dattatreya Satoskar; 26 March 1909 Marcel, Portuguese Goa
- Died: 27 November 2000 (aged 91)
- Occupation: Publisher; editor
- Notable works: Gomantak Prakriti ani Sanskriti

Balkrishna Dattatreya Satoskar (26 March 1909 – 27 November 2000) was an Indian historian, freedom fighter, publisher, journalist, and librarian. Born in Marcel, Goa, he authored numerous books in Marathi and Konkani. He is best known for Gomantak Prakriti ani Sanskriti (Goa: Nature and Culture), an encyclopedic six-volume work on the history and culture of Goa and Goans, of which three volumes were published.

== Early life and education ==
Balkrishna Dattatreya Satoskar was born on 26 March 1909 in Marcel, Goa. His family, originally bearing the surname Kamat, was originally from Goa. His ancestors migrated to Satoshe in Sawantwadi State, where they served as Kulkarnis (village scribes), before eventually returning to Goa to engage in trade.

He began his education at Saraswati Vidyalaya in Mapusa. He completed primary and secondary schooling in the Portuguese language and attended a lyceum, though he left during his fourth year. He later completed his matriculation in English medium. Satoskar briefly attended an art school in Bombay for higher education in sculpture but did not complete the course. He went on to obtain a Bachelor of Arts degree. Although he was unsuccessful in his Master of Science examination, he later answered the Library Science examination at the age of 44, securing the first rank.

== Career ==
=== Librarianship ===
Satoskar had an early interest in the library movement. As a child, he established the "Sharda Mandir" library in Marcel. He began his professional career as an assistant librarian at the Bombay University. He subsequently served as the Chief Librarian and later the executive director of the Mumbai Marathi Granth Sangrahalaya.

During his tenure, Satoskar developed a new, simplified method for classifying Marathi texts, applying this system to approximately five million books. His classification treatises were later adopted as textbooks by the Government of Maharashtra for library science examinations. He edited Sahitya Sahakar, a library journal, and organized several library conferences. He presided over the first Gomantak Library Conference and inaugurated the Sawantwadi session of the Maharashtra State Library Council.

=== Journalism and publishing ===
In 1935, Satoskar established the Sagar Prakash Sanstha (Sagar Publishing Institute) and the Sagar Sahitya Printing Press in Girgaon, Mumbai. He entered journalism by writing columns for publications such as Goa Times, Kesari, Loksatta, and Lokmanya between 1946 and 1954.

He edited the magazine Dudhsagar and the newspaper Amche Goan to promote social and political causes. Following the Liberation of Goa, he became the first editor of the daily newspaper Gomantak. He authored Patravidya (1967), a book on journalism. He also wrote under the pseudonym "Gangadhar" for the Gomantak Sunday edition.

=== Freedom struggle ===
Satoskar was an active participant in the Goa liberation movement. He joined the National Congress (Goa) in 1946 and served as the president of its Mumbai branch in 1953.

== Literary works ==
Satoskar was a prolific writer across various genres, including history, criticism, novels, and children's literature. His magnum opus, Gomantak Prakriti ani Sanskriti, was intended as a six-volume series on Goan culture and history; three volumes were published during his lifetime. The work was republished in March 2009 to mark his birth centenary.

His other significant works include:

- Gokarna Partagal Mathacha Itihas (History of the Gokarna Math).
- Marathi Masikanchi Shambhari (A history of Marathi magazines).
- Swapnagandha (An autobiographical series).
- Patravidya (A treatise on journalism).

He translated several Western classics into Marathi, including Pearl S. Buck's The Good Earth (as I-Earth) and The Mother, and Charles Dickens' Oliver Twist (adapted as Digya). He also translated short stories by Guy de Maupassant and various Portuguese authors. He was known for adapting thousands of mystery stories into Marathi.

== Awards and recognition ==
Satoskar served on various advisory boards, including the Sahitya Akademi (Delhi), the Goa Gazetteer Editorial Board, and the Kala Academy. He received the Sharda Award from the Goa Kala Academy and the State Award for Literature. He was honoured by the Kesari Maratha Trust in 1982 and held honorary memberships in the Institute Menezes Braganza and the Goa Hindu Association.

== Legacy ==
The Directorate of Official Language, Government of Goa has instituted the B. D. Satoskar Marathi Bhasha Puraskar under the Bhasha Puraskar Yojana. The award is conferred upon personalities to honour their contribution to the Marathi language. The award consists of rupees one lakh, a memento, a certificate, a shawl, and a shriphal (coconut).
