= The Mother (Buck novel) =

1934 novel by Pearl S. Buck

The Mother is a novel by Pearl S. Buck, first published in New York by the John Day Company in 1934. It follows the life of peasant woman in rural China before the 1911 Revolution, as she struggles to raise her children and cope with poverty, famine, and social oppression. The novel explores the themes of motherhood, gender roles, family, and tradition in a changing society. The novel is based on Buck’s observations and experiences as a missionary’s daughter in China. Buck later acknowledged that the protagonist of the novel is influenced by her longtime housemaid in Nanjing.

Buck wrote the first draft of The Mother following the completion of The Good Earth. Although she harbored doubts about the quality of her work and was initially hesitant to publish it, the persistent persuasion from the John Day Company eventually led to its publication.

The novel was generally well received. James Donald Adams of The New York Times Book Review lauded its cohesive structure, simplicity and vigor.

== Sources ==
=== Books ===
- Conn, Peter J. (1998). Pearl S. Buck: A Cultural Biography. Cambridge University Press. ISBN 978-0-521-63989-7.
