= Indian name =

Indian names are based on a variety of systems and naming conventions, which vary from region to region. Names are also influenced by religion and caste and may come from epics. In Hindu culture, names are often chosen based on astrological and numerological principles. It is believed that a person's name can influence their destiny, and astrologers may be consulted to ensure a name suits the individual's birth chart. India's population speaks a wide variety of languages, and many religions of the world have a following in India. This variety makes for subtle differences in names and naming styles.

In some cases, an Indian birth name is different from their official name; the birth name starts with a selected name from the person's horoscope (based on the nakshatra or lunar mansion corresponding to the person's birth).

Many children are given three names, sometimes as a part of a religious teaching.

Research suggests that many Indians have officially adopted caste-neutral last names to mitigate historical inequalities. Some of India’s most famous celebrities have changed their names. For example, Amitabh Bachchan was originally named Inquilab Srivastava, Akshay Kumar was named Rajiv Hari Om Bhatia, and Dilip Kumar was originally named Muhammad Yusuf Khan. In many parts of India, the practice of name "doubling" is now wide-spread, i.e. a citizen adopts a “caste-neutral” last name for school, work and official settings, but retains a traditional name for personal interaction or to access certain state schemes.

== Pronunciation ==
When written in Latin script, Indian names may use the vowel characters to denote sounds different from conventional American or British English. Although some languages, like Kannada or Tamil, may have different vowel sounds, the ones used in most major Indian languages are represented in this table along with typical English transcriptions.

| IPA | ə/ɔ | aː | ɪ | iː | ʊ | uː | eː | ɛː/əɪ/ɔi | o | ɔː/əʊ/ou |
| English transcription | a | a | i | ee | u | oo | e | ai | o | au/ou |

Furthermore, the letters used in English /t/ and /d/ that are used to represent the retroflex stops /ʈ/ and /ɖ/, are also used to represent dental stops /t̪/ and /d̪/ (as in Tenginkai or Rohit), especially when they occur in the onset of a word. As an example, the Indian name 'Dev' would not have its first consonant pronounced as in the American name 'Dave'. Similarly the name 'Tarun' would not have its first consonant sounded as in 'Tom'.

The letter 'h' is used to represent aspirated consonants. So, in the names 'Khare', 'Ghanshyam', 'Kaccha', 'Jhumki', 'Vitthal', 'Ranchodh', 'Siddharth', 'Phaneesh', and 'Bhanu,' the 'h' means the sound before it should be pronounced with a strong outward breath (see Aspirated consonant for more on this). These names are more likely to be found in places that speak an Indo-Aryan language like Bhojpuri, Gujarati, Punjabi, or Bundeli.

== Names by culture ==
=== Assamese ===
Assamese names follow the First name – Middle name – Surname or First name – Surname pattern. The Paik system used by various Assamese kingdoms, most notably the Ahom, granted men titles depending on the number of paiks they could command, and these titles are often still used as surnames today. Titles such as Bora (20), Saika (100), Hazarika (1000) imply that their ancestors commanded 20, 100 or 1000 men. The topmost ranks were granted titles such as Phukan, Barua and Rajkhowa. Some titles, such as Phukan, derive from Tai Ahom rather than Assamese. These surnames can be held by people from any community. For instance, in Binanda Chandra Barua, Binanda is the first name, Chandra the middle name and Barua the last name, indicating his ancestors were high in the Paik system.

There are some community-specific surnames such as Gogoi (Ahom) and Sarma (Brahmin) (ex: Himanta Biswa Sarma). Tribal communities such as Boro, Dimasa and Karbi follow a similar naming scheme, although their surnames are generally clan names.

=== Bengali ===
Bengali names follow the First name – Middle name – Surname pattern, as seen with Subhas Chandra Bose.

Bengali Brahmin surnames include Acharjee, Banerjee, Bagchi, Bhaduri, Bhattacharjee, Chakraborty, Chatterjee, Ganguly, Goswami, Ghoshal, Lahiri, Maitra, Mukherjee, Sanyal, Kanjilal, Bhattashali, Putatundu etc. A Brahmin name is often the name of the clan or gotra, but can be an honorific, such as Chakraborty or Bhattacharya.

Common Baidya surnames are Sengupta, Dasgupta, Duttagupta, Debgupta, Sen, Gupta, Das Sharma, and Sen Sharma.

Bengali Kayastha surnames include Basu, Bose, Dutta, Ghosh, Choudhury, Roy Chowdhury, Ray, Guha, Mitra, Sinha/Singha, Pal, De/Dey/Deb/Dev, Palit, Chanda/Chandra, Das, Rakshit, Sen, Dam, Dhar, Mallik, Kar, Nandi, Nag, Som, etc.

=== Odia ===
Odia names follow the First name – Middle name – Surname or First name – Surname pattern.

Odia surnames come from caste based on human occupation. For example, the common surnames Kar, Mohapatra, and Dash (as opposed to Das) are Brahmin surnames. Similarly, Mishra, Nanda, Rath, Satpathy, Panda, Panigrahi, and Tripathy are all Brahmin surnames.

Mohanty, Das, Choudhury, Ray, Kanungo, Mangaraj, Bohidar, Bakshi, Patnaik, Samantaray, Routray, Mahasenapati, Srikarana, Chhotray and Das Mohapatra are Karan surnames and some are khandayats . Others are Samant, Samanta Singhar, Dhal, Dhalsamanta, Sundaraya, Jagdev, Baliarsingh, Harichandan, Mardraj, Srichandan, Pratihari, Paikray, Patasani, Parida, Samal, Sahu, Nayak, and Muduli.

=== Goan ===
Konkani people inhabiting Goa, and also Konkan regions of Karnataka and Maharashtra, use First name – Middle name – Village name/Surname pattern. Generally, the first name is followed by the father's name, though this is now mostly observed by Hindus, who are traditionally patriarchal.

Village names were used only after the arrival of the Portuguese, when the people migrated from their ancestral villages. A suffix kar or hailing from was attached to the village name.

Many of the originally Hindu residents were converted to Catholicism by the Portuguese. Almost all of the Konkani Catholics have Portuguese surnames like Rodrigues, Fernandes, Pereira and D'Souza. Catholic families belonging to the Roman Catholic Brahmin (Bamonn) caste use lusophonised versions of Hindu surnames like Prabhu, Bhat, etc.

=== Gujarati ===
Gujarati names follow a pattern of First name – Father's first name – Surname. In many Gujarati households, a paternal aunt has the honour of naming her brother's child. Traditionally, the suffix -bhai or -ben is added to the end of a given name to show respect for men and women respectively, but this practice is uncommon in contemporary times, and many are choosing to remove it. After marriage, a woman can take her husband's patronymic or his given name as her new middle name. The surname or family name is derived from place names, trades or occupations, religious or caste names, or nicknames. Given names and their suffixes differ based on sex and religion. Examples:

- Mohandas Karamchand Gandhi: Mohandas is his given name, Karamchand is his father's name, and Gandhi is his surname.
- Jashodaben Narendrabhai Modi: Jashoda is her given name, -ben is the suffix, Narendrabhai is her husband's name, and Modi is her surname.

Traditionally, names were often borrowed from religion, but in modern times, names are borrowed from literature, film, and politicians. Sanskrit tatsama names are also increasing as a source for names to the detriment of tadbhava and deshya names, especially amongst tribal groups. In modern times, there has also been the creation of pleasant-sounding but meaningless names, as well as the borrowing of foreign names among English-educated metropolitans due to India's history with Britain. Mistry states these processes in name changes are due to social factors where members of the lower strata of Gujarati society adopt Sanskrit names in mimicry of higher strata, who must then create new names from native or foreign sources to maintain status. Another factor he states is the declining religiosity of modern generations.

=== Hindi Belt ===
This naming custom is prevalent throughout the Hindi Belt, and is also followed also by groups in this region who may not speak a Hindi-related language variety as their first language such as Gonds or Santals. Northern naming customs follow a standard pattern of First name – Middle name – Surname. Many times the middle name will be appended onto the first name, or not exist at all. Sometimes middle name would even be father's first name. The surname is most commonly a caste-related name however, there are some caste-neutral surnames like Kumar. For example: Bhajan Lal Sharma (Bhajan is his first name, Lal is a middle name, and Sharma is a caste surname). Many women, especially in rural areas, take on the surname Devi (meaning Goddess) or Kumari (princess) when they are married (ex. Phoolan Devi, known as Phoolan Mallah before marriage). Muslims in North India use Islamic naming conventions.

=== Kannada ===
Kannada names vary by region as follows.

North Karnataka follows the First name – Father's first name – Surname order. This system is also found in other parts of Karnataka.

Surnames are drawn from the names of places, food items, dresses, temples, type of people, platforms, cities, professions, and so on. Surnames are drawn from many other sources.

Katti as a suffix is used for soldiers while Karadis is related to local folk art. Surnames according to trade or what they traditionally farm include Vastrad (piece of cloth), Kubasad (blouse), Menasinkai (chili), Ullagaddi (onion), Limbekai, Ballolli (garlic), Tenginkai (coconut), Byali (pulse), and Akki (rice). Surnames based on house include Doddamani (big house), Hadimani (house next to the road), Kattimani (house with a platform in its front), Bevinmarad (person having a big neem tree near his house), and Hunasimarad (person having a big tamarind tree near his house). A carpenter will have Badigar as a surname, while Mirjankar, Belagavi, Hublikar, and Jamkhandi are surnames drawn from places. Angadi (shop), Amavasya (new moon day), Kage (crow), Bandi (bullock cart), Kuri (sheep), Kudari (horse), Toppige (cap), Beegadkai (key), Pyati (market), Hanagi (comb), and Rotti (bread) are some other surnames.

In coastal Karnataka, the surnames are different in different regions. Surnames like Hegde and Hebbar belong to the Brahmin community, while other titles like Ballal, Shetty, and Rai are mostly used by the landed Bunt community. Names in coastal Karnataka have both systems Village name–Father's name–Personal name–Surname and Personal name – Father's name – Surname.

Names in South Karnataka follow Village name – Father's name – Personal name – Surname. Examples:

- H[aradanahalli] D[evegowda] Kumaraswamy: Haradanahalli is his native village, Devegowda is his father's name, and Kumaraswamy is his given name.
- T[umkur] M[ahesh] Pranav: Tumkur is his native town, Mahesh is his father's name, and Pranav is his given name.

For married women, it is Husband's name – First name or the opposite (ex. Sumalatha Ambareesh, where Ambareesh is her husband's name).

In South Karnataka, caste names are not common except among the higher castes. Kannada Brahmins have surnames like Rao, Murthy, Poojari, and Bhat. The title Gowda was a title given to any village headman, irrespective of caste, and was written as an appendage to the person's name. For example Siddaramaiah's father belonged to the Kuruba community but was called Siddarame Gowda. Nowadays it is mostly used as a Vokkaliga surname. Most people in South Karnataka, regardless of caste, do not use caste surnames.

=== Kashmiri ===
Kashmiri names often follow the naming convention First name – Middle name (optional) – Family name. (For example: Jawahar Lal Nehru)

Nicknames often replace family names. Hence, some family names like Razdan and Nehru may very well be derived originally from the Kaul family tree.

=== Malayali ===
Malayali surnames include Nair, Menon, Pillai, Nambootri, Panikkar, and Kurup. Some Malayalis follow similar naming customs to Tamils and people in South Karnataka, using Village name – Father's name – Personal name. Some Muslim Malayalis also follow this system, though their first names follow the Islamic system.

Members of the Menon, Nair, and related communities often use their mother's house name or directly add their caste name. For example, Kannoth Karunakaran, Karunakaran is his given name and Kannoth is his mother's house name. P. K. Vasudevan Nair, Vasudevan is his given name and Nair is his caste surname. Most of the Malayalis write name as Given name – Father's name – Grandfather's name/house name/village name – Surname/caste title. For instance, Shreelakshmi Dhanapalan Sadhu Kunjpilla, where Shreelakshmi is the first name, Dhanapalan is the middle name/father's name, Sadhu is the grandfather's name, and Kunjpilla is the surname/caste title. It might also be written as Shreelakshmi Dhanapalan S K.

Earlier (until the 20th century), Malayali Christians (Nasranis) were bound by Christian names only and usually used the Family/house name – Father's name – Baptismal name naming convention. Nowadays, however, Christians have various naming conventions such as:

- Name – Middle name – Father's Name (E.g. Shine Tom Chacko)
- Name – Father's name (E.g. Nivin Pauly, Amala Paul)
- Name – Family/House Name (E.g. Asin Thottumkal)
- Name – Father's Name – Grandfather's Name
- Name – Father's Name – House/Family Name (E.g. Innocent Vareed Thekkethala).
- House/Family Name – Father's Name – Name (E.g. Kunnumpurath Mathew Augustine)

It can be concluded that Syrian Christian names are patronymic. E.g.: Arackaparambil Kurien Antony, better known as A. K. Antony, here the politician's name is Antony, while his father's name is Kurien, and his family name is Arackaparambil. For females, their Syrian Christian names are matronymic sometimes; the first-born girl is traditionally named after the paternal grandmother, and the second-born girl after the maternal grandmother. From around the mid-1980s, it became common to use a more secular or modern first name, with the grandmother’s name shifting to the middle name. So, for example, if a man named George has a mother named Mary and his wife's mother is named Lisa, and they have two daughters named Elsa and Theresa, their full names would typically be Elsa Mary George and Theresa Lisa George. (E.g. Tania Rachel James, where Tania is the first name, Rachel is the grandmother's name, and James is the family name). During the 20th century, some names were created by joining two or more syllables. For example, Abey (AB), Aji (AG), Bibi (BB), Biji (BG), Siby (CB) and so on. Today, several Syrian Christians name their children after popular Indian names such as Deepak, Rahul, Neethu, Asha, etc. But by the 21st century, more biblical names began to reappear. Thus names like, Isaac, Joshua, David, Saul, Albin, Abel, Anna, Sara, Theresa, Joel, Timothy, appeared on the scene.

=== Marathi ===
Marathi people of Hindu religion follow a partially patronymic naming system. For example, it is customary to associate the father's name with the given name. In the case of married women, the husband's name is associated with the given name. Therefore, the constituents of a Marathi name as given name/first name, father/husband name, family name/surname. For example:

- Mahadev Govind Ranade: Here Mahadev is the given name, Govind is his father's given name and Ranade is the surname.
- Sunil Madhav Jadhav: Here Sunil is the given name, Madhav is his father's name and Jadhav is the surname.
- Jyotsna Mukund Khandekar: Here Jyotsna is the given name, Mukund is the husband's given name, and Khandekar is the surname of the husband

==== Personal names ====
Marathi Hindus choose given names for their children from a variety of sources. They could be characters from Hindu mythological epics such as the Ramayana or Mahabharat, names of holy rivers such as Yamuna and Godavari, Hindu historical characters from Maratha or Indian history such as Shivaji and Ashoka, Marathi varkari saints such as Tukaram, Dnyaneshwar, Janabai, popular characters from modern Marathi literature, names of fragrant flowers for girls (e.g. Bakul, Kamal/Kamla for lotus), senses such as Madhura for sweetness, precious metals such female name Suwarna for gold, heavenly bodies such as the Sun and the Moon, Vasant and Sharad for spring and autumn respectively, names of film stars (e.g. Amit after Amitabh Bachchan) or sportsmen, and after virtues (e.g.,Vinay for modesty). Nicknames such as Dada, Bandu, Balu, Sonya and Pillu for males and Chhabu and Bebi for girls have been popular too.

==== Surnames ====
A large number of Maharashtrian surnames are derived by adding the suffix kar to the village from which the family originally hailed. For example, Junnarkar came from town of Junnar, Waghulkar comes from the town of Waghul. Names like Kumbhar, Sutar, Kulkarni, Deshpande, Deshmukh, Patil, Pawar, Desai, and Joshi denote the family's ancestral trade or professions.

Families of the historical Maratha chiefs use their clan name as their surname. Some of these are Jadhav, Bhosale, Chavan, Shinde, Shirke, More, Nimbalkar, Pawar, and Ghatge. Members of the numerically largest Maratha-Kunbi cultivator class among Marathi people have also adopted some of the Maratha clan names, whether to indicate allegiance to the Maratha chief they served, or as an attempt at upward mobility.

=== Punjabi ===
Punjabi names vary based on religious and regional sub-systems. Punjabi Muslims, Hindus, and Sikhs follow different naming traditions. Punjabi Muslims often have Urdu or Islamic names, such as Muhammad, whilst Hindus have general Hindu names. Punjabi Sikhs and Hindus may share a common set of names. For Punjabi Muslims and Hindus, names are generally not unisex and thus certain names are only given to bearers' belonging to a particular gender. For Muslims, an example of this is Razia being given to females whilst for Hindus an example is Shóba being given to females. For Punjabi Sikh names, a common set of names are used for both males and females as Sikh names are generally unisex, with the marker of the gender of the bearer resting on if either Kaur or Singh forms part of their name. After getting married, Punjabi women adopt a new name from their husband's family. Married Sikh and Hindu Punjabi women have the shrimatī title prepended to their first name when others call on them. Meanwhile, unwedded Punjabi women have the kumārī title prepended to their first name when others mention them. In intimate settings, both the personal name or the family name are said. Honorifical terms, such as -ji, can be used in conjunction either the first, middle, or last name, being appended to the respective name. To show closeness to someone, the person's nickname may also be appended with the -ji honorifical suffix.

In rural areas of Punjab, wives generally do not refer to their husbands by their actual first name, preferring instead to use vocative rather than interrogative intonative language. Methods of this including calling their husband as the father of one of their children, such as "the father of Ram", or by using expressions, such as bolde náī ['don't (you) speak'] or suNde o ['do (you) hear (me)?']. Some rural wives only call their husbands with the ji honorific. Another naming trend in rural Punjab is naming children "unflattering names with negative overtones" due to a prevailing superstition.

=== Sikh ===
Sikh names often have the following format: First name – Religious name – Family name. Sikh first names serve as personal names and are selected through the Naam Karan ceremony, where a random page of the Guru Granth Sahib is opened by a granthi (Sikh priest) and the first letter of the first prayer on the opened page is used as the basis for the first name as an initial. Most Sikh first names are unisex and often are appended with prefixes and suffixes, such as -jit, -winder, or -want. The religious name is Singh ("lion") for males and Kaur ("princess") for females. First and religious names are usually used together by Sikhs. Some Sikhs have a family name whilst others only have a personal name and religious name. For the Sikhs that have a family name, it usually consists of a caste-based or sub-caste-based name which marks the individual's caste identity. Sikhism opposes the caste system, thus traditionally Sikhs did not have caste-based surnames, however they have been adopted by some Sikhs to match with naming conventions outside India. For the Sikhs who do not have a caste-based surname, some use Singh or Kaur as their surname instead.

Many Sikhs append the name of their sub-caste (known as a got in Punjabi and gotra in Hindi) as their surname. A got is an exogamous grouping within a particular caste (known as a zat in Punjabi and jati in Hindi). A zat is an endogamous caste grouping, which contains gots under it. Some Sikhs are against the usage of got names as surnames because they think it promotes the caste system and the discrimination that comes from it, which is against Sikh doctrines. Sikhs tend to marry someone belonging to a different got as themself whilst belonging to the same zat. Since the second-half of the 20th century, some Sikhs from socially and economically-disadvantaged castes have adopted the gotra names of privileged castes as their surnames in an attempt to hide their original caste-background and seek upward social mobility.

Sardar for males and Sardarni for females are sometimes prefixed as titles. A lot of Sikh first names can be used by both sexes.

=== Tamil ===
Tamil names usually follow this pattern: Initial (Village name) – Initial (Father's name) – Given name (Example: M. P. Sivagnanam, where the M stands for Mylai, and P stands for Ponnusamy, the father's name. Another example is R. Karthik, where R stands for Ravichandran, the father's name). There is a widespread usage of a patronym (use of the father's given name as the last name). This means that the first name of one generation becomes the last name of the next. In many cases, the father's given name appears as an initial and when written in full (for example, on a passport), the initial is expanded as last name. For example, a name like "R. Kumaresh" will be written in full as "or "Kumaresh Ramaiah", and refers to "Kumaresh son of Ramaiah". If Kumaresh then has a son named Vijay, then his name would be "K. Vijay" or "Vijay Kumaresh" as it would be in the West. There is also a general custom for Tamil women, after marriage to adopt their husband's first name as their new initial or new last name instead of their father's. A woman named K. Anitha / Anitha Kumaresh (Anitha daughter of Kumaresh) might change her name after marriage to S. Anitha / Anitha Saravanan (Anitha wife of Saravanan). However, these customs vary from family to family and are normally never carried on over successive generations.

One of the factors is due to the influence of the Dravidian movement, from the 1930s, most Tamils abandoned their surnames, both in India and nations like Singapore, due to the arising consciousness that these surnames were synonymous with their caste identity, leading to social stigma. This is just one of the reasons.

More common among women, making the patronym or husband name the last name is a custom adopted by people migrating to the West, who want to be called by their first names without having to explain Indian naming conventions. However, women frequently adopt their father's or husband's name, and take it for successive generations.

The various Tamil caste names include Paraiyar, Vishwakarma, Aachari, Konar, Idaiyar, Udayar, Yadhavar, Iyengar, Iyer, Pillai, Mudaliar, Thevar, Nadar, Chettiar, Gounder, Vanniyar etc. The naming is therefore done in the fashion: Sunitha Ram Kumar Iyer. And hence they are known to only use initials besides their name except for when caste names are given more preference by certain families rather than the family name itself.

=== Telugu ===
Telugu people have a different naming style from the rest of India. The family name is a genitive case, hence stands first, which is followed by personal name. This practice of placing family name first is also seen in Chinese, Japanese, Koreans, Vietnamese and Hungarians.

This "Family name (surname), Given name" format differs from that used in North India, where the family name typically appears last. This practice also contrasts with that of other parts of South India, where family names are little used. These differences can sometimes cause confusion within India and rest of the world.

Occasionally, caste name is also suffixed at the end. For example, Neelam Sanjiva Reddy, where Neelam is the family name, Sanjiva is the given name, and Reddy is the caste name.

Occasionally, some Telugu names may follow a slightly different convention where two personal names are given along with a family name. In the name, Aakula Anjaneya Prasad, Aakula is the family name and Anjaneya Prasad are the given names.

Telugu Muslims, however, typically have family names expressed at the end of their names.

==== Personal names ====
Telugu people are often named after Hindu gods or goddesses.

==== Family names ====
Nearly all Telugus possess family names called "Inti peru" (lit. 'House name').

Telugu family names are often named after places. For example, Pasupaleti after Pasupaleru, Kondaveeti after Kondaveedu, Kandukuri after Kandukur, etc. Unlike western names, in which the family name is more well known than the personal name, among the Telugu given names are how people are most widely known.

Telugu family names are often abbreviated and written, e.g., P. V. Narasimha Rao, D. Ramanaidu, etc., unlike western names where given name is abbreviated.

== Indexing ==
According to The Chicago Manual of Style, Indian names are usually indexed by the family name, with the family name separated from the other names by a comma, but indexing may differ according to the local usage and the preferences of the individual.

== Global Indian influence in names ==
See Indosphere, Sanskritisation, Indianization of Southeast Asia as well as Influence of Indian honorifics in Southeast Asia, influenced the Malay/Indonesian, Thai, and Filipino honorifics.

== See also ==
- Indian honorifics
- Place names in India
- Surnames by country
