= Karan Kayastha =

Community of Kayasthas in India and Nepal

Karan Kayastha is a community of Kayasthas that inhabit Odisha and the Mithila region, a region now divided between India and Nepal.

== Origin ==
According to Manu, a Hindu scripture, the Karans are regarded as bratya (degraded) Kshatriyas.

== Culture and profession ==
The archaeologist B. P. Sinha says that the duty of Karanas was rajaseva and durgantapuraraksha.

Epigraphist Dineshchandra Sircar mentions that several historial edicts and inscriptions have been found in the relevant geographic locations that show that the terms Karana, Karanin, Karaneeka, Karanakas and Karaneegars are used to represent a bureaucratic range from clerks to ministers. Significant among these are Minor Rock Edict No. II, the Kanas plates of Lokavigraha, the Ghugrahati copperplate of Samacharadeva and the Tipper copperplate of Lokanath etc.

== Karn of Mithila ==
The Karna Kayasthas are viewed as a part of the ancient embodiment of Mithila culture along with Maithil Brahmins. They do not fit in four varna system but still became a dominant caste of this region.

== Karan of Bengal ==
The Karan caste group can also be found in Bengal region from the mediaeval era(Bengali Kayastha). The post of Karan used to be a professional designation that was occupied by literate people. They exclusively served the ruling powers as their ministers, advisors, governors, military commanders, accountants, record keepers and diwans. According to Historian Ramesh Chandra Majumdar the Karan merged themselves into the Kayastha caste who performed the same profession.

=== Notable people ===
- Jyoti Basu
- Bidhan Chandra Roy
- Sukanta Majumdar, Central Union Minister in Council of Ministers of India.

== Karana of Odisha ==
Karanas in Odisha are referred to as members of writer caste community, they are a prosperous and influential community of Odisha and rank next to Brahmins in the social hierarchy. Karanas received land grants in mediaeval period and held feudatory status in Odisha. Karanas also held high positions in government during mediaeval period. As per Sircar the Bhajas inscription, mentions a list of individuals involved in land records and contains a phrase 'Brahmana-Karana-Puroga-Nivasi' which is a good indication of their social status. Historian RS Sharma has also mentioned that Loknatha, a Karana, was also referred to as a Brahmin in inscriptions, even in current scenario they hold good political power in Odisha including several Chief Ministers in recent years. Karanas consider themselves as a separate group distinct from Kayasthas. Karanas had also developed their own unique "Karani" script named after their community to write documents in Odisha. Additionally Karanas are also mentioned as "Grama Karana" and "Mandala Karana" in Ganga and Gajapati records having authority over a large number of villages, similarly the "Chamu Karana" and "Deula Karana" of Gajapati period were the private secretary of the king and the chief administrator of Jagannath Temple respectively. Karanas emerged as a significant social group in Eastern Ganga dynasty as evident from early Ganga records, they occupied various important positions in the Ganga administration, from that of a village headman and accountant to that of a prime minister and army general. An important official under Narasimha Deva 4 of Ganga dynasty named “Srikarana Pattanaik Viswanatha Mahasenapati” was the governor and army general of four Dandapatas or regions in Eastern Ganga dynasty, he was known to be the “Chaturadikha Danda Pariksha” of Eastern Ganga Dynasty or “Governor General” of all the four directions north, south, east and west as evident from Ganga inscriptions. A military general named Srikaran Patnaik of Athagada Patna Kingdom of Ganjam district under the ruler Govindchandra is said to have led a successful expedition against the Bhanja ruler and defeated him, the victorious army under his command had captured the Bhanja fort of Kakarsali and built a new fort named Mandaragad, Srikaran Patnaik had placed 300 soldiers to guard the captured fort. Similarly Ramananda Ray and his brother Gopinatha Badajena were governors in Gajapati Empire. Karanas emerged from the community of Kshatriyas. Karanas were the major landholders of Odisha, however post Orissa famine of 1866, the percentage of landholdings for some Karana Landlords declined. An official named Trilochan Patnaik of the Karan Community who was in charge of collection of revenue during the Maratha Rule of Odisha had managed to acquire the zamindari of “Kotdesh” from the Marathas by paying a large amount of nazarana (money) in 1775, Trilochan Patnaik had made himself known in the Maratha administration through his intelligence and skills, he became the founder of one of the largest Zamindari estates of Odisha. Trilochan Patnaik was succeeded by his son Narayan Chotrai in 1792, Narayan Chotrai was the Zamindar of Kotdesh during the British conquest of Odisha, “KOTDESH” was one of the 7 great zamindaris of Odisha at the time of British conquest. The zamindari was later auctioned off by the British government in 1896 due to arrears of revenue and debt of the estate.

=== Notable people ===
- Naveen Patnaik
- Nabakrushna Choudhuri
- Biju Patnaik
- Janaki Ballabh Patnaik
- Biren Mitra
- Madhusudan Das
- Laxmikanta Mohapatra
- Radhanath Ray
- Gourishankar Ray
- Achyutananda Dasa
- Balarama Dasa
- Ananta Dasa
- Bisara Mohanty
- Ramananda Ray
- Birakishore Das
- Nityanand Kanungo
- Sarala Devi
- Ramadevi Choudhury
- Bira Kishore Ray
- Sukanta Kishore Ray
- Ananga Kumar Patnaik
- Braja Sundar Das
- Jagu Dewan
- Banamali Dasa
- Gopalakrusna Pattanayaka
- Kalicharan Pattnaik
- Gopinath Mohanty
- Akshaya Mohanty
- Prana Krushna Parija
- Gopal Ballav Pattanaik
- Nikhil Mohan Pattnaik
- Chandi Prasad Mohanty
- Sarat Pattanayak
- Bijoy Mohapatra
- Uttam Mohanty

== Karanam or Sistakarnam of Andhra and Telangana ==
Karanam (Telugu: కరణం) or Karnam was an office and title native to the Indian states of Andhra Pradesh and Telangana. Traditionally, Karanam was an official who maintained the accounts and records of the villages and collected the taxes. Sircar mentions that they mostly dealt with accounting, bureaucracy, teaching etc.
