= Patnaik =

Patnaik (also spelled: Pattanayak, Pattanaik, Pattnayak, Chau Patnaik) is a native Odia surname found in states like Odisha, northeastern districts of Andhra Pradesh and southern districts of West Bengal in India. This surname is mainly found in Karana community of Odisha. Tadhau Karana servitors of Jagannath Temple, Puri belonging to Karana community mainly use the title "Pattanayaka". Historically, Deula Karana servitors of Jagannath Temple, Puri also used the title of “Pattanayaka” alongside titles like “Pattajoshi” and “Paricha”.

Notable people with the surname include:

- Ananga Kumar Patnaik (born 1949), Indian jurist, who server on the Supreme Court of India
- Arup Patnaik (born 1955), former Police Commissioner of Mumbai & Indian Politician
- Biju Patnaik (1916–1997), Indian politician & Former Chief Minister Of Odisha
- Ramananda Ray Patnaik, Vaishnava philosopher and governor of the southern territories of Suryavanshi Gajapati Empire of Odisha
- Gopalakrusna Pattanayaka, Vaishnava Saint also a prominent court poet and minister of the Paralakhemundi kingdom of Eastern Ganga dynasty of Odisha
- Banamali Dasa (Pattanayaka), Vaishnava Saint and court poet under King Birakishore Deva of Bhoi dynasty of Odisha
- Jagabandhu Patnaik (Jagu Dewan), Dewan of Raja Arjun Singh of Porahat in Singhbhum
- D. B. M. Patnaik (1925–2009), Indian lawyer, politician and communist leader
- Devraj Patnaik (born 1975), Canadian-born composer, musician and choreographer
- Dinesh K. Patnaik (born 1967), Diplomat
- Donkada Patnaik (1925–2009), Indian solicitor and politician
- Ellora Patnaik (born 1968), Canadian-born actress and Odissi dancer
- Gopal Ballav Pattanaik (born 1937), former Chief Justice of India
- Hara Patnaik (1958–2015), Oriya actor, film director and screenwriter
- Ila Patnaik, Indian economist and a financial journalist
- Janaki Ballabh Patnaik (1927–2015), was leader of the Indian National Congress and former chief minister of Orissa
- Naveen Patnaik (born 1946), former Chief Minister of Orissa & Former Central Minister of Government of India
- Niranjan Patnaik, Indian politician & Former OPCC President
- Prabhat Patnaik (born 1945), Indian Marxist economist and political commentator
- R. P. Patnaik, Indian film music director
- Raghunath Patnaik, veteran leader of the Indian National Congress
- Soumya Ranjan Patnaik, businessman, member of Parliament Rajya Sabha
- Sudarshan Patnaik (born 1977), inventor of sand art in India
- Sudhir Pattnaik, journalist and a social activist of Odisha
- Utsa Patnaik, Indian Marxist economist
- Devdutt Pattanaik (born 1970), Indian mythologist, writer and columnist
