= Mallik =

Mallik may refer to:

- Mallik Island in Canada
- Mallik gas hydrate site in Canada
- Mallik, Northwest Territories, see Ice Road Truckers#Season 2
- Mallik Rehan Tomb, Sira, a mausoleum in India
- Mallik (surname)
