= Jena (surname) =

Jena is an Odia surname. People surnamed Jenā mostly belong to the Chasa, Khandayat, Shudra Mahalayak and Pano castes and also the Karan community.

Indian people with the surname include

- Bhanu Pratap Jena (born 1955), American cell biologist
- Bijaya Jena, Indian actress, film director and producer
- Kishore Jena (born 1995), Indian track and field athlete
- Mohan Jena (born 1957), Indian politician
- Srikant Kumar Jena (born 1950), Indian politician
- Surendra Nath Jena, Indian Odissi dancer

Other people

- Günter Jena (1933–2026), German choral conductor and musicologist

== See also ==
- Odia surnames
