= Kripesh =

Kripesh (Devanagari: कृपेश) is an Indian masculine given name. It is a compound of the Sanskrit kṛpā 'compassion' and īśa 'lord'. The variant Krupesh is used in parts of Karnataka and Gujarat.

== Usage ==
In Gujarat, Krupesh is a name commonly given to children in which the gender is thought to be female before birth, but is determined to be a boy at delivery. Krupa is the actual name given if the child turns out to be a female.

This is true in some parts of Gujarat.
