= Dinakrushna Dasa =

Odia poet and lyricist

Dinakrushna Das
- ଦୀନକୃଷ୍ଣ ଦାସ
- Born: c. 1650; Munutunia village, Jaleswar, Balasore district, Odisha, India
- Died: c. 1710 (aged 59–60); Ekagharia, Dhenkanal, Odisha, India
- Occupations: Poet, lyricist
- Writing career
- Language: Odia
- Period: Medieval period
- Genres: Bhajan, Chautisa, Chaupadi, Janana
- Notable work: Rasakallola, Artatrana Chautisa, Rasa Vinoda
- Literary movement: Bhakti movement (Vaishnavism)

Dinakrushna Dasa (Odia: [t̪aːriɳi t͡ʃɔɾɔɳɔ paːt̪ɾɔ]; ଦୀନକୃଷ୍ଣ ଦାସ; 1650–1710) was an Odia poet, belonging to the Vaishnava tradition of Bhakti movement. He is known for his Odia poem titled "Rasakallola", which is devoted to Lord Krishna. Among his many literary compositions, "Artatrana Chautisa" is a reputed one. Dinakrusna's Rasakallola and his standalone compositions including "Chaupadi", "Prabhati", "Janana", "Chautisa", "Bhajana", and "Malasri" are central to the repertoire of Odissi music, the traditional classical music of the state.

== Biography ==
=== Early life and lineage ===
Dinakrushna Dasa was born into a scholarly Karan family in Munutunia village, located near Jaleswar in the Balasore district of Odisha. Dasa lived during the late 17th to early 18th century. He was a contemporary of the Bhoi dynasty kings of Puri, notably Raja Mukunda Deva I (1651–1686 A.D.) and Raja Divyasingha Deva I (1686–1713 A.D.). While he lacked formal high-level institutional schooling, he achieved deep erudition independently, gaining mastery over Sanskrit poetics (Alankara Shastra), grammar, astrology, and traditional Indian classical medicine.

=== Illness and royal confrontation ===
A major part of Dasa's adult life was spent in Puri, where his personal life was fraught with continued poverty and physical suffering. He was afflicted with leprosy, which was treated as a severe social curse during his era. Despite his physical ailments and subsequent social isolation, he regularly visited the Jagannath Temple in Puri, standing behind the Garuda Stambha (Garuda pillar) to sing moving devotional songs (Jananas).

Recognizing his immense poetic capability, the contemporary Gajapati King of Puri offered Dasa royal patronage, wealth, and medical assistance on the condition that the poet write a panegyric (praise poem) in the king's honor. Dasa famously rejected all royal allurements, asserting that his literary skills would solely glorify Lord Jagannath. This defiance drew the wrath of the royal court, leading to his eventual banishment from Puri.

=== Final years ===
Dasa spent the final phase of his life in Ekagharia, near the Brahmani River in Dhenkanal. He died at a site that was later honored and constructed as "Sarana Srikhetra".

== Literary career and style ==
Dinakrushna Dasa has over 15 major epic poems (kavyas), as well as numerous Chautisa (34-stanza poems) and lyrical Chaupadis to his credit. The most recurrent themes in his bibliography are the glorification of Lord Jagannath and the portrayal of the mystical love between Radha and Krishna. Stylistically, Dasa had a unique signature of suffixing several of his secondary theological texts with terms like "Sagara" (Ocean) or "Sindhu" (Sea).

=== Notable works ===
- Rasakallola (ରସକଲ୍ଲୋଳ) — Magnum opus
- Rasa Binoda (ରସ ବିନୋଦ)
- Bhaba Samudra (ଭାବ ସମୁଦ୍ର)
- Guna Sagara (ଗୁଣ ସାଗର)
- Amruta Sagar (ଅମୃତ ସାଗର)
- Tattva Sagar (ତତ୍ତ୍ୱ ସାଗର)
- Bhuta Keli (ଭୂତ କେଳି)
- Naba Keli (ନବ କେଳି)
- Samsara Bodhana (ସଂସାର ବୋଧନ)

== Rasakallola ==
Rasakallola (meaning "The Waves of Divine Delight") holds an unparalleled status in classical Odia literature for its structural complexity and musicality. Dealing with the amours of Krishna with the maidens of Vraja, the work consists of 34 melodious cantos (Chhandas).

The epic poem is celebrated for its unique lipogrammatic constraint: every single line of the entire 34-canto work begins with the initial sound "Ka" (କ), the first consonant in the Odia alphabet. Despite this strict structural restriction, Dasa maintained fluid emotional expression (Rasa), narrative rhythm, and extensive vocabulary throughout the text.

The cantos are musically arranged according to traditional Odissi Ragas and Raginis, intended for vocal performance. Philosophically, the book reinforces a core tenet of Odia Vaishnavism by treating Lord Jagannath and Lord Krishna as the absolute same cosmic entity. Unlike many of his contemporary poets from the Reeti/Riti era who wrote with heavy eroticism, Dasa exercised profound aesthetic restraint, focusing instead on landscape imagery, seasonal cycles, and the psychological depth of spiritual longing.

== Scholarly debates on identity ==
In Odia literary historiography, there is an ongoing scholarly debate regarding whether "Dinakrushna Dasa" refers to a single individual or multiple historical poets writing under the same name. Some scholars divide the works between "Kavi Dinakrushna" (the master of style who wrote Rasakallola) and "Bhakta Dinakrushna" (the devotee who wrote simpler, deeply emotional prayers). However, traditional consensus views him as a singular historical figure whose stylistic evolution accommodated both complex classical poetry and simple devotional lyrics.

== See also ==
- Odia literature
- Odissi music
- Upendra Bhanja

== Bibliography ==
- Surendra Mahanty (1985). Dinakrushna Das. Sahitya Akademi.
