= Karan (caste) =

Social community of Odisha, India

- କରଣ
- Religions: Hinduism
- Languages: Odia
- Populated states: Odisha
- Subdivisions: Karan, Karan Vaishnav
- Related groups: Brahmin
- Status: Forward caste

The Karan is a writer caste community found in the state of Odisha in India. The post of Karana used to be a professional designation that was occupied by literate peoples. They held Karanam posts in some parts of Andhra Pradesh, where they speak Odia and played a similar role in Odisha to that of the Kayasthas of West Bengal and Bihar. In the social hierarchy of Odisha they rank next to Brahmins, they are also considered a highly influential and prosperous caste of Odisha. They exclusively served the ruling powers as their ministers, advisors, governors, military commanders, village headman, accountants, record keepers and dewans. They owned most Zamindaris in Odisha. They have the highest literacy caste-wise and are highly prosperous. Today they are a politically dominant community and have reigned over the politics of Odisha for more than 50 years.

== Origin ==
=== Divisions ===
Karanas in Odisha are divided into various divisions, out of these divisions Kshatriya Karanas are considered superior to other divisions of Karanas. They are classified as Vratyas. Karanas used to observe rituals like Sati and Upanayana in their community.

=== Medieval Period ===
The frequent admission of land grants to princes, Brahmins and various officials gave rise to a new class of writers. However the Karanas crystallized into a distinct caste only in the 10th or 11th century AD owing to social mobility. Any mention of the term prior to that period simply denotes its functional aspect rather than a caste affiliation.

== History ==
Medieval Period

Karanas along with Brahmins feature in the 10th century inscriptions of Odisha and are represented as heads of the local population through the following verse “Brahmana-Karana-Puroga-Nivasi”. Such depiction denotes their high social rank. Karanas enjoyed high status in medieval period and married within the royal households. An example of this can be found in the Arasavali copper plate of the Eastern Ganga monarch Vajrahasta III. They occupied high positions under the feudatory kings of Odisha, most of them were appointed as Dewans in the princely states of Odisha. Karanas find mention in Bhauma-Kara records and are represented as Sadhyadhikarana or Chief Judicial Officer of a district. Similarly Srikarana featured in the temple inscription is said to have been the accountant general of Anangabhima Deva III of Eastern Ganga dynasty. A Kosthakarana was a top administrative officer of Narsimha Deva IV of Eastern Ganga Dynasty. Terms like Deula Karana represented the rank of Temple administrator. Samanta Karanas were the aristrocratic families of Karanas from Odisha, the word Samanta was also used by the kings of Odisha, thus it can be said Karanas were associated with the royal families of Odisha. The head of a Karana family was known as Samanta while his wife was known as Samantani. Karanas also received land grants and held feudatory status in medieval Odisha. They appear to be an important community in Eastern Ganga dynasty as they held high positions in the government such as the post of army general, prime minister, village headman and accountant. Karanas find mention in Ganga records as Sthala-Karana (sub-divisional accountant), Behara-Karana (an executive or sub-divisional accountant) and Vura-Karana or Grama-Karana (village accountant), the Simhachalam temple inscription of Ganga dynasty also mentions an official named Narasimha Nayaka of the Karana community as an individual rich in the knowledge of accounts and was honoured as “Ganita Jnanasampanno”. Additionally Karanas are also mentioned as "Grama Karana" and "Mandala Karana" in Ganga and Gajapati records having authority over a large number of villages, similarly the "Chamu Karana" and "Deula Karana" of Gajapati period were the private secretary of the king and the chief administrator of Jagannath Temple respectively. Karanas were associated with the administration of the ruling dynasties of Odisha, a general named Srikarana Mahananda Senapati of the Karan caste was the army general and governor of the ruler Anangabhima Deva III of Eastern Ganga dynasty. Srikarana Mahananda Senapati was the “Senadhyakshawara” of the kingdom or Commander-in-Chief of the Ganga forces. Another general named Srikarana Pattanaik Viswanatha Mahasenapati was the army general and governor of the ruler Narsimha Deva IV of Eastern Ganga Dynasty, he was the governor of four Dandapatas or Rajyas of Eastern Ganga Dynasty spread across the four directions north, south, east and west of the kingdom, he was also the Puro Srikarana of the Kingdom or Prime Minister, he was honoured with the epithet “Chaturdik-Danda-Pariksha” or Governor General of all the four directions. Another general and “Mahamandalika,” or feudal chief, named Srikarana Suru Senapati, under the reign of Anangabhima Deva III of the Eastern Ganga Dynasty, donated lands to the Jagannath Temple of Puri, as evident from the inscriptions. Ramananda Ray was the governor of the southern territories in the Suryavamsha Gajapati Empire; he was also a minister of Gajapati Prataparudra Deva. Governors in Gajapati Empire were designated as "Rajas" also known as "Parikshas" of their territory, Prataparudra Deva had appointed Ramananda Raya as the Raja of Rajahmundry in Gajapati Empire during his reign. Ramananda Raya belonged to an influential and aristocratic Karana family. Ramananda Raya's brother Gopinatha Badajena Pattanayaka was also the governor of Midnapore in the northern frontier of the Suryavamsha Gajapati Empire. Ramananda Raya's father, Bhavananda Ray Patnaik, was the Samanta, or feudal chief, of Bentapur in the Suryavamsha Gajapati Empire. As the governor of the southern territories, Ramananda Raya commanded a large royal entourage of elephants, horses and soldiers, he ruled over the southern territories of the Gajapati kingdom from his capital at Rajahmundry. The Princely state of Athgarh was established by Raja SriKaran Niladri Bhagirath Barman Patnaik in the 12th century whose descendants ruled the kingdom with the hereditary title of “Raja Srikarana” until the kingdom's accession to India. He was the minister of the Raja of Puri, who conferred on him the title of Raja and gave him Athgarh for his service. Jagannath Temple inscriptions of the ruler Kapilendra Deva of Suryavamsha Gajapati Empire also mentions Pattanayaka Damodara Mahasenapati as a prominent courtier of Kapilendra Deva, it also records other officials like Srikarana Sivadas Mahasenapati who presented gifts to Kapilendradeva. Pattanayak Damodara was an army general and one of the key associates of Kapilendra Deva who helped Kapilendra in usurping the throne from the last Ganga ruler Bhanudeva IV. Bissamcuttack kingdom was founded by Mallu Mohanty, a trader from Karana community who migrated from Paralakhemundi, he is said to have won the confidence of the local tribal groups of the region and was elected by them as their ruler, his descendants were known as ‘Thatrajas’ who ruled over the kingdom, Mallu Mohanty maintained a military force of over 1000 armed Paikas (soldiers), this kingdom was known for its alliance and dispute with the neighbouring Jeypore kingdom, Bissamcuttack rulers provided 800 Paikas (soldiers) to Jeypore in times of alliance as a mark of support while the later Bissamcuttack rulers defied the authority of Jeypore rulers one of whom also declared his kingdom independent from the Jeypore state during the British rule under the influence of one of his Brahmin ministers. Sridhara Pattanayak was the army general of the royal forces of Khurda kingdom during the reign of Gajapati Birakishore Deva I of Bhoi dynasty, he waged a war against the ruler of Banki kingdom, defeated him and took him as a prisoner in Khurda on the orders of the Gajapati. Sridhara Pattanayak had also renovated and constructed the roof of Mukti Mandapa temple complex for Brahmins in Jagannath temple of Puri during the reign of Birakishore Deva I. Ramachandra Pattanaik and his father Paramananda Pattanaik were Dewans under Gajapati Dibyasingha Deva I of Khurda, they were instrumental in coronating the Gajapati amid invasions of Mughal subedars on Khurda and were also the founders of the fort of Rathipur. An official named Mukunda Pattanayaka was appointed as chief temple superintendent or Pariksa of Jagannath temple of Puri by Ramachandra Deva I of Bhoi dynasty after he renovated the temple post the invasion of Kalapahad, Mukunda had reestablished the rituals of Jagannath temple and also recalled the servitors who moved to different places due to invasion. A military general named Srikaran Patnaik of Athagada Patna Kingdom of Ganjam district under the ruler Govindchandra is said to have led a successful expedition against the Bhanja ruler and defeated him, the victorious army under his command had captured the Bhanja fort of Kakarsali and built a new fort named Mandaragad, Srikaran Patnaik had placed 300 soldiers to guard the captured fort. An official named Trilochan Patnaik of the Karan Community who was in charge of collection of revenue during the Maratha Rule of Odisha had managed to acquire the zamindari of “Kotdesh” from the Marathas by paying a large amount of nazarana (money) in 1775, Trilochan Patnaik had made himself known in the Maratha administration through his intelligence and skills, he became the founder of one of the largest Zamindari estates of Odisha. Trilochan Patnaik was succeeded by his son Narayan Chotaraya in 1792, Narayan Chotaraya was the Zamindar of Kotdesh during the British conquest of Odisha, “KOTDESH” was one of the 7 great zamindaris of Odisha at the time of British conquest. Kotdesh Estate was the largest Zamindari of Puri district; it covered an area of 182 square miles and encompassed 355 villages. The zamindari was later auctioned off by the British government in 1896 due to arrears of revenue and debt of the estate. Odia Vaishnava saints of the ‘Pancha Sakha’ group namely Achyutananda Dasa, Balarama Dasa, and Ananta Dasa also hailed from prominent Karana families of their time. Bhramara Pattanayaka was the Dewan of Gajapati Divyasingha Deva II of Bhoi Dynasty, he was given the important task of unearthing the Konark Sun Temple by Gajapati Divyasingha Deva II. The ‘Baya Chakada Pothi’, a chronicle of Konark Sun Temple's construction accounts, was authored by Vidyadhara Pattanayaka, a Baya Karana under Narasingha Deva I. He records that his grandfather, Laxmana Chaukarana, died fighting under Anangabhima Deva III, while his father, Nidhi Pattanayaka, was martyred in Gaudadesa (Bengal) during Narasingha Deva I's campaign. Vidyadhara later became the ‘Sana Paricha’ (deputy supervisor) of the Konark temple.

== Social status ==
Modern Period

In British colonial era, Karanas owned most Zamindaris in Odisha and were extremely rich. They also received large amounts of land grants in Khurda administration of Khurda Kingdom. Karanas also occupied the post of principal village headman of all the villages in Khurda Bhoi kingdom as evident from the administrative documents maintained in Karani script by the Bhoimuls or accountants of Khurda kingdom who themselves hailed from Karana community. Thus Karanas worked as Bhois/Accountants and Principal Village headman in Khurda Bhoi kingdom.

In recent post-Independence era India, they have also played a dominant role in politics. Such is their prominence in politics that many members from the Karan community have been elected as the Chief Ministers of Odisha, hence they are also dubbed as the political caste of Odisha.

== Society and culture ==
Role in temple administration

Deula Karana and Tadhau Karana sub divisions of Karanas are the key servitors in the Jagannath Temple of Puri. They along with other key servitors manage the administration of temple. Historically, Deula Karana servitors served as the “Chief Temple Superintendent” or “Chief Administrator” of the Jagannath Temple, Puri, under various ruling dynasties of Odisha. Deula Karana and Tadhau Karana servitors are also the representatives of the Raja of Puri and assist him in performing the temple rituals associated with Lord Jagannath. As per Jagannath temple traditions, Deula Karana and Tadhau Karana servitors hold the Pata Khanda sword of Lord Jagannath during the Nabakalebara ceremony of the temple. Deula Karana and Tadhau Karana servitors are also accorded the “Mahanayaka” status alongside the Rajguru and the Gajapati Raja in the Jagannath Temple of Puri. Historian Hermann Kulke also states that the Turban worn by the Deula Karana servitors is tied on their head by the Brahmin priests of the temple unlike the other servitors whose turbans are different from the one worn by the Karana servitors and their turbans are tied on their head by the Karana servitors of the temple. Other Karana servitors like Kotha Karana sub division act as the protective force of Lord Jagannath carrying swords and knives during the Chandan Yatra ceremony, while Behera Karana sub division plays an important part during the Sari Bandha (turban tying) ritual of Jagannath temple on behalf of the Gajapati king.

== Notable people ==
=== Chief Ministers ===
- Nabakrushna Choudhury; freedom fighter and former Chief Minister of Odisha who served twice from 1950 to 1952 and from 1952 to 1956. He played an important role in shaping the state's early governance. He is especially known for his efforts to abolish the Zamindari system, which helped end feudal land ownership and improved the condition of farmers. He also worked for rural development, land reforms, and social justice, leaving a lasting impact on Odisha's progress.
- Biren Mitra; Indian politician and freedom fighter who served as the first Deputy Chief Minister of Odisha from 1961 to 1963 and subsequently as the 4th Chief Minister of Odisha from 1963 to 1965. A key leader during Odisha's post-independence era, his administration focused heavily on modernization, economic growth, and expanding the state's heavy industrial infrastructure, notably promoting large-scale projects like the Rourkela Steel Plant.
- Biju Patnaik; a towering Indian statesman, freedom fighter, aviator, and industrialist, widely regarded as one of the most influential leaders in Odisha's history. He served as the Chief Minister of Odisha twice (1961 to 1963 and 1990 to 1995), where he emphasized rapid industrialization, infrastructure development, and regional empowerment. His governance focused on transforming Odisha into a modern, self-reliant state. At the national level, Biju Patnaik also held important positions in the Union Government. He served as a Union Cabinet Minister for Steel and Mines (1977–79) under Morarji Desai. In this role, he contributed to strengthening India's industrial and mineral sectors. Beyond politics, he gained international recognition for his daring role as a pilot during World War II and for assisting in the Indonesian independence movement, earning honors from Indonesia.
- Janaki Ballabh Patnaik; Indian politician, writer, and one of long-serving leader of Odisha. He served as the Chief Minister of Odisha in three terms (1980 to 1985, 1985-1989 and 1995–1999),making him one of the longest-serving CMs of the state. His tenure focused on industrial growth, rural development, and expansion of education. At the national level, he also held important responsibilities. He served as a Union Cabinet Minister for Tourism, Civil Aviation, and Labour (1970s–1980s) under the leadership of Indira Gandhi, contributing to policy development in these sectors. Later, he was appointed as the Governor of Assam (2009–2014).
- Naveen Patnaik; Indian politician and second longest-serving Chief minister in India. He is the leader of the Biju Janata Dal and the son of legendary Biju Patnaik. He has served as the Chief Minister of Odisha continuously from 5 March 2000 to 12 June 2024, completing five consecutive terms (2000–2004, 2004–2009, 2009–2014, 2014–2019, 2019–2024). His governance is known for clean administration, welfare schemes, disaster management, and development work in rural and urban areas. Before becoming Chief Minister, he served in the Union Government as Cabinet Minister for Mines from 1998 to 2000 under Atal Bihari Vajpayee. After the 2024 Odisha Assembly elections, he assumed the role of Leader of Opposition in the Odisha Legislative Assembly.

=== Freedom Fighters & Social Reformers ===
- Utkala Gouraba Madhusudan Das; a distinguished Indian nationalist, eminent lawyer, social reformer, and a key architect of modern Odisha, widely revered as “Utkal Gourab” (Pride of Odisha). He holds the distinction of being the first graduate and first barrister from Odisha, and was among the earliest leaders to advocate for the unification of Odia-speaking regions into a separate province. His efforts laid the foundation for the eventual creation of Odisha as a distinct state. He served as a minister in the Bihar and Orissa Province from 1921 to 1923, where he actively promoted industrial development, self-reliance, and the growth of indigenous enterprises. He was a strong supporter of local industries and worked to uplift artisans and promote economic independence. He was also championed social reform, education, and the preservation of Odia language and culture. His visionary leadership and lifelong dedication to public service have left a lasting legacy, making him one of the most revered figures in Odisha's history.
- Gopabandhu Choudhury; a prominent freedom fighter, social reformer, and dedicated Gandhian leader from Odisha. He played a significant role in India's independence movement and worked closely with the ideals of Mahatma Gandhi. He left his government job as a Deputy Collector under the British administration to join the freedom struggle and actively participated in movements like the Non-Cooperation Movement and Civil Disobedience Movement. He devoted his life to serving the poor, promoting rural development, and uplifting marginalized communities. He was deeply committed to social justice and worked towards the eradication of untouchability and the spread of education in rural areas. His simple lifestyle, selfless service, and dedication to Gandhian principles made him a highly respected figure in Odisha's history.
- Ramadevi Choudhury; a prominent freedom fighter, social reformer, and dedicated follower of Gandhian principles from Odisha. She is widely regarded as one of the leading women figures in the state's independence movement. She actively participated in major movements like the Non-Cooperation Movement and Civil Disobedience Movement under the guidance of Mahatma Gandhi. She played a key role in mobilizing women to join the freedom struggle and worked extensively for rural upliftment. She devoted her life to social service, especially in the areas of women's empowerment, education, and the eradication of untouchability.
- Annapurna Choudhury; freedom fighter, Gandhian, and social worker from Odisha, known for her lifelong dedication to social service and women's empowerment. She was the daughter of Gopabandhu Choudhury and Ramadevi Choudhury. She actively participated in India's freedom struggle from a young age and worked closely with the ideals of Mahatma Gandhi. She was involved in movements promoting self-reliance, khadi, and rural development. After independence, She continued her work in social reform, women's rights, and upliftment of the underprivileged. She dedicated her life to education, village development, and promoting Gandhian values such as simplicity and non-violence.
- Braja Sundar Das; freedom fighter, social reformer, third graduate of Odisha and political leader from Odisha. He actively participated in India's independence movement and worked for the upliftment of society. He was associated with the Indian National Congress and contributed to movements inspired by Mahatma Gandhi. He worked for rural development, education, and social equality. He also played an important role in public service after independence, focusing on welfare activities and development work in Odisha. He is remembered for his dedication to the people and his contributions to social reform.
- Sarala Devi; Independence activist, feminist, social activist, writer, She was remembered for her pioneering role in women's empowerment and social reform in Odisha. She emerged as one of the early women leaders in the state who was the first woman to join the Non-cooperation movement also the first woman to be elected to the Odisha Legislative Assembly. She was actively participating in the freedom movement inspired by Mahatma Gandhi. She consistently worked for the advancement of women's rights, education, and social equality, while also striving for the upliftment of weaker sections of society. Her leadership and dedication helped break societal barriers, making her a significant figure in promoting progressive change and inclusive development.
- Gopala Ballabha Das; writer, social reformer, deputy magistrate in British Government, assistant of Odisha commissioner during British rule who played an active role in India's struggle for independence. Before joining the freedom movement, he worked in government service, but later left his job to dedicate himself to the national cause under the influence of Mahatma Gandhi. He was associated with the Indian National Congress and actively participated in movements such as the Non-Cooperation Movement, helping to spread political awareness among the masses. His contributions were significant in mobilizing people and promoting the ideals of self-reliance, unity, and social reform. After independence, he continued his public service, contributing to democratic development and welfare activities in Odisha.
- Jagabandhu Patnaik; Dewan of Porahat and the first martyr from Odisha in the Indian Rebellion of 1857 who played a courageous role in resisting British authority and stood firmly against colonial oppression. He is remembered for his bravery and sacrifice in the struggle against British rule, where he laid down his life for the cause of freedom. His martyrdom made him a symbol of resistance and patriotism in Odisha's history.
- Bhagirathi Mahapatra; Indian lawyer, freedom fighter, and politician who co-founded the Utkal Pradesh Congress Committee in March 1921 alongside Pandit Gopabandhu Das, serving as its first founder secretary until 1937. A prominent leader of the Non-cooperation, Salt Satyagraha, and Quit India movements, his post-independence career included serving as a member of the Central Legislative Assembly (1945–1947) and representing Odisha in the Rajya Sabha from 1956 to 1962.
- Nityanand Kanungo; a prominent Indian politician, freedom fighter, and senior leader from Odisha. He played an active role in the Indian independence movement and was associated with the Indian National Congress. After independence, he held important positions in public life. He served as a Union Cabinet Minister for Commerce and Industry (1957–1962) under Jawaharlal Nehru, where he contributed to India's industrial and economic development. He also served as the Governor of Gujarat (1965–1967) and later as the Governor of Bihar (1967–1971), continuing his service in administrative and constitutional roles.
- Binod Kanungo; a noted writer, freedom fighter, and encyclopedist from Odisha, best known for his remarkable contribution to Odia literature and knowledge dissemination. He actively participated in the Indian freedom movement and was influenced by the ideals of Mahatma Gandhi. Despite limited resources, he dedicated his life to spreading knowledge among the masses. His most significant achievement was the creation of the Odia encyclopedia “Jnanamandala,” which he developed almost single-handedly to make knowledge accessible to common people in their native language. He also founded the Jnanamandala Foundation to support this work.
- Biswanath Pattnaik; a noted social worker and Gandhian leader from Odisha, best known for his active role in the Bhoodan Movement led by Vinoba Bhave. He dedicated his life to land reform, rural development, and the upliftment of the poor and marginalized. As a key leader of the Bhoodan movement in Odisha, he worked tirelessly to persuade landowners to donate land to landless farmers, promoting the ideals of equality and social justice. He also focused on education, tribal welfare, and community development, working to improve the living conditions of underprivileged sections of society. His simple lifestyle and commitment to Gandhian values made him a respected figure in social reform. .
- Sarangadhar Das; a distinguished politician, social reformer, and leader from Odisha who played an important role in shaping modern India. He was a member of the Constituent Assembly of India, contributing to the drafting of the Indian Constitution. He was actively involved in advocating for social justice, education, and the rights of marginalized communities. His work in the Constituent Assembly reflected his commitment to democratic principles, equality, and regional development.

=== Vaishnav Saints ===
- Achyutananda Dasa; a renowned 16th-century Vaishnava saint, poet, and spiritual leader from Odisha. He was one of the key figures in the Utkaliya Vaishnavism movement, which emphasized devotion to Lord Krishna and the spread of Bhakti (devotional worship). He was a disciple of Chaitanya Mahaprabhu's teachings and worked to propagate the principles of love, devotion, and moral living. He composed numerous devotional hymns and texts in Odia, contributing richly to Odia literature and spiritual thought. He is also known for his efforts in reforming society, promoting ethics, devotion, and spiritual discipline among people of all social backgrounds.
- Ananta Dasa; a prominent 16th-century Vaishnava saint, poet, and devotional leader from Odisha, associated with the Utkaliya Vaishnavism movement. He was a contemporary of Achyutananda Dasa and a follower of Chaitanya Mahaprabhu's teachings. He played a key role in spreading Bhakti (devotion to Lord Krishna) and moral-religious values among people of all social backgrounds. He is especially famous for his literary contributions, including devotional poems, songs, and spiritual texts in Odia that enriched Odia literature and promoted religious devotion. One of his major achievements was the composition of Bhakti Paddhatis and Chautisha works, which provided guidance on devotional practices and ethical living.
- Balarama Dasa; 15th-century poet seer, litterateur, writer of Jagamohana Ramayana and Lakshmi Purana, considered one of the pioneers of Odia devotional literature. He was deeply influenced by the Bhakti movement and devoted his life to spreading devotion to Lord Krishna. He is especially known for his literary masterpiece, the Odia Mahabharat, which was one of the first comprehensive retellings of the epic in the Odia language. Through his writings, Balarama Dasa popularized religious teachings, moral values, and devotion among the common people. Apart from his literary contributions, he worked to promote Bhakti, spiritual discipline, and moral living. His teachings and compositions had a lasting impact on Odia literature and the Vaishnava tradition in Odisha.
- Dinakrushna Dasa; a prominent medieval Odia poet and a leading figure of the Vaishnava bhakti tradition in Odisha. He is best known for his lyrical masterpiece Rasakallola, which depicts the divine love of Radha and Krishna with remarkable poetic elegance. he spent much of his life in Puri as a devoted worshipper of Lord Jagannath. His devotional songs and poetic compositions occupy an important place in Odia literature and Odissi music. Among his notable works are Rasakallola, Artatrana Chautisa, Rasa Binoda, and Guna Sagara.

=== Historical Figures ===
- Bisara Mohanty; 16th-century Odia Vaishnava devotee and historical figure of Jagannath culture who rescued the ''Brahma Padartha'' (the indestructible, sacred divine core) of Lord Jagannath. Disguised as a wandering musician, he retrieved the unburnt navel core from the ashes or the Hooghly/Ganga river bank after the iconoclast general Kalapahad desecrated and burned the deity's wooden idol during the 1568 Afghan invasion. He smuggled the sacred substance back to Kujanga Garh safely hidden inside a ''mridanga'' drum, preserving it until it was ceremonially returned to Puri by Gajapati Ramachandra Deva I to perform the first historical Nabakalebara ritual.
- Ramananda Ray; 15th-to-16th-century statesman, scholar, and saint who served as the governor of Rajahmundry, the southern territory of the Suryavamsi Gajapati Empire under Emperor Prataparudra Deva. A foundational figure in Gaudiya Vaishnavism and one of the most intimate spiritual associates of Chaitanya Mahaprabhu, he authored the celebrated Sanskrit devotional drama Jagannatha Vallabha Natakam, which explicitly synthesized standard Krishna-bhakti theology with Jagannatha culture.
- Madhavi Pattanayak; 16th-century CE devotional poet, mystic, and foundational figure of early Odia literature who is recognized as the first recorded female writer of Odisha. She became a close disciple of Chaitanya Mahaprabhu following her early widowhood, adoption of the ascetic name Madhavi Dasi, and association with her cousin, Governor Ramananda Ray. Her extensive early Odia and Sanskrit Brajavali compositions permanently introduced the complex theological concepts of Raganuga Bhakti into regional literature and historically document the formal institution of the specialized Pahili Bhoga food offerings inside the Jagannath Temple, Puri.

=== Art & Literature ===
- Brajanath Badajena; Odia poet and descendant of 16th-century poet Raghu Arakhita.
- Banamali Dasa; Odia bhakti-poet and composer of Odissi music .
- Jatiya Kabi Birakishore Das; National poet, social activist, politician and the editor of "Mo Desha" .
- Kanta Kabi Laxmikanta Mohapatra; illustrious Odia poet and patriot who wrote Odisha's immortal state anthem “Bande Utkala Janani” and is revered as the voice of Odia nationalism.
- Gopalakrusna Pattanayaka; Odia poet and composer of Odissi music.
- Radhanath Ray; poet, novelist, essayist, educationist, cultural relativist, orator and songwriter.
- Pratibha Ray; renowned author and academic, best known for her contributions to Odia literature. Jnanpith Award for her novel Yajnaseni, which powerfully reinterprets the character of Draupadi from the Mahabharata.
- Gourishankar Ray; writer and a prominent figure amongst the makers of Modern Odisha.
- Deba Prasad Das; Odissi classical dancer and Guru, recognized as one of the four first-generation masters who revived and structured the dance form, known for his robust style rooted in Gotipua traditions and recipient of the Sangeet Natak Akademi Award in 1977.
- Jagannath Prasad Das; renowned Odia writer, children's author, essayist, educationist, playwright, and translator. He made significant contributions to Odia literature through his novels, essays, dramas, and literary criticism. His works reflected social, cultural, and human values and earned him widespread recognition. He was honored with several prestigious awards, including the Sahitya Akademi Award, for his outstanding contribution to literature.
- Artaballabha Mohanty; writer, literary critique and the publisher of only available print record of Madala Panji.
- Kalicharan Pattnaik; eminent literary and artistic figure of Odisha.
- Annada Shankar Ray; Indian poet and essayist.
- Gopinath Mohanty; novelist, winner of Jnanpith Award and Sahitya Akademi Award.
- Surendra Mohanty; author, politician and Padma Shri award winner.

=== Education & Research ===
- Prana Krushna Parija; Botanist, academic, and politician who served as the foundational first Vice-Chancellor of Utkal University, Pro-Vice-Chancellor of Banaras Hindu University, and as an independent Member of the 1st Odisha Legislative Assembly. A pioneer in modern Indian plant physiology, he was appointed an Officer of the Order of the British Empire (OBE) in 1944 and awarded the Padma Bhushan in 1955.
- Sudhira Das; first woman engineer of Odisha, pioneering technical education for women in the state.
- Bidhu Bhusan Das; educator, public intellectual and ex-principal of Ranchi University (now Dr. Shyama Prasad Mukherjee University), vice Chancellor of Utkal University, an advisor to King Mahendra of Nepal and played a key role in establishing Kathmandu's Tribhuvan University also helped to setup Nagaland University.
- Prabhat Nalini Das; Public intellectual, first dean/director of Humanities division at IIT Kanpur, vice chancellor of North-Eastern Hill University also served as a professor of English and head of the English department at several prestigious institutions including Delhi University, Ranchi University, Lady Shri Ram College and Utkal University.
- Madhu Sudan Kanungo; renowned Indian scientist in the fields of neuroscience and gerontology. He is best known for his Gene Expression Theory of Aging, also founder-director of Institute of Life Sciences, Bhubaneswar, chancellor of Nagaland University and Padma Shri award winner.
- Jitendra Nath Mohanty; Indian philosopher, served as an emeritus professor of philosophy in Temple University, Philadelphia, Pennsylvania, United States.
- Nikhil Mohan Pattnaik; Indian scholar, scientist and founder of Srujanika, a science education and research non profit organization situated in Bhubaneswar.

=== Jurists ===
- Ananga Kumar Patnaik; Jurist who served as a Justice of the Supreme Court of India from 2009 to 2014. He previously served as the Chief Justice of the High Court of Chhattisgarh and the High Court of Madhya Pradesh.
- Gopal Ballav Pattanaik; Jurist who served as the 32nd Chief Justice of India in 2002. He previously served as a Judge of the Supreme Court of India and as the Chief Justice of the Patna High Court.
- Bira Kishore Ray; Jurist who served as the first Chief Justice of the Orissa High Court following its establishment in 1948, and previously served as the first Advocate General of Odisha.
- Sukanta Kishore Ray; Jurist who served as the Chief Justice of the Orissa High Court and briefly as the acting Governor of Odisha, later serving as the state's Lokpal.
- Jugal Kishore Mohanty; Jurist who served as the Chief Justice of the Sikkim High Court and previously as a senior judge of the Orissa High Court.
- Pradip Kumar Mohanty; Jurist who served as the Chief Justice of the Jharkhand High Court and later as the Acting Chairperson of the Lokpal of India. He is the son of former Sikkim High Court Chief Justice Jugal Kishore Mohanty.

=== Notable individuals ===
- Chandi Prasad Mohanty; retired Lieutenant General of the Indian Army, 42nd Vice Chief of the Army Staff, former General Officer Commanding-in-Chief of the Southern Command.
- Shaktikanta Das; retired 1980-batch IAS officer of the Tamil Nadu cadre, former Governor of the Reserve Bank of India (2018–2024), and nephew of the prominent Odisha freedom fighter and legislator Prananath Pattnaik.
- Kishen Pattnaik; Socialist leader, author, and politician who served as a Member of Parliament in the 3rd Lok Sabha representing Sambalpur. He was the national president of the Samajwadi Jan Parishad and founded the Hindi political journal Samayik Varta.
- Jayanti Patnaik; four-time Member of Parliament, first Chairperson of National Commission for Women and wife of former Chief Minister of Odisha and former Governor of Assam Shri Janaki Ballabh Patnaik.
- Niranjan Patnaik; Indian politician who served as the President of the Odisha Pradesh Congress Committee 3 times and held multiple cabinet portfolios, including Industries, Revenue, and Health, in the Government of Odisha.
- Sarat Pattanayak; Indian politician who served as a two-time President of the Odisha Pradesh Congress Committee and represented the Bolangir constituency as a Member of Parliament in the 10th and 11th Lok Sabha.
- Banamali Patnaik; Freedom fighter and politician who served as the president of the Utkal Pradesh Congress Committee, an elected Member of Parliament in the 5th Lok Sabha representing Puri, and a state cabinet minister in Odisha.
- Samir Mohanty; Indian politician who served as the president of the Bharatiya Janata Party (BJP) Odisha state unit and has been active in public service as a senior state leader.
- Soumya Ranjan Patnaik; politician, writer, and film producer who served as a Member of the Legislative Assembly and Member of Parliament. He is the founder-editor of Sambad, Odisha's largest circulated Odia daily newspaper.
- Arup Patnaik; Retired Indian Police Service (IPS) officer who served as the 36th Police Commissioner of Mumbai and later transitioned into public service as a state political leader in Odisha.
- Ashok Kumar Das; Indian politician who served as the Leader of the Opposition in the Odisha Legislative Assembly from 1996 to 1997 and was elected as a five-time Member of the Legislative Assembly representing the Korei constituency.
- Pranab Prakash Das; Indian politician who served as the Minister for Energy, Information Technology, and Regional Development in Naveen Patnaik Government, and was elected as a three-time Member of the Legislative Assembly representing the Jajpur constituency.
- Bijoy Mohapatra; Indian politician who served as the Minister for Irrigation, Water Resources, and Parliamentary Affairs in the Odisha state government, and was a key strategist during the Biju Patnaik administration.
- Naba Kishore Das; Indian politician who served as the Minister of Health and Family Welfare in the Odisha state government and was elected as a three-time Member of the Legislative Assembly representing the Jharsuguda constituency.
- Manas Mangaraj; Indian politician and journalist who serves as a Member of Parliament in the Rajya Sabha representing Odisha. He previously served as the general secretary of the Biju Janata Dal and as the media advisor to the Government of Odisha.
- Akshaya Mohanty; Renowned playback singer, lyricist, composer, and author who shaped modern Odia music. He received the Jayadev Award, Odisha's highest state honour in cinema, for his lifelong contributions to the industry.
- Hara Patnaik; Odia actor, director, and screenplay writer who appeared in over 60 films and directed nearly 20 features, playing a defining role in Odisha's cinema industry. He was also credited with introducing multiple successful actors to the Odia film market.
- Akshay Parija: Film producer, director, and international businessman who has produced critically acclaimed Odia and Bengali cinema. He has won multiple National Film Awards and Odisha State Film Awards for his artistic and socially relevant productions.
- Bijay Mohanty; Versatile actor and director who appeared in more than 300 films and was honored with the Jayadev Award for his life-long contribution to Odia cinema. He won a National Film Award for his debut performance and went on to secure six Odisha State Film Awards alongside the Orissa Cine Critics Award.
- Arindam Ray; Odia film actor and politician who has played leading roles in numerous commercially successful action and romantic feature films.
- Buddhaditya Mohanty; Television and film actor who has worked across the Odia and Hindi entertainment industries, appearing in popular national television soap operas, regional commercial movies, and reality shows.
- Mahasweta Ray; Veteran actress who has worked extensively across the Odia, Telugu, and Bengali film industries. She has won multiple Odisha State Film Awards and the Jayadev Award for her lifelong contributions to regional cinema.
- Anubhav Mohanty; Actor and politician who has appeared in numerous commercially successful Odia and Bengali films. He served as a Member of Parliament in both the Rajya Sabha and the 17th Lok Sabha, representing the Kendrapara constituency, and later joined the Bharatiya Janata Party
- Uttam Mohanty; Veteran actor who has appeared in more than 130 Odia films alongside multiple Bengali and Hindi projects. He is a recipient of the Jayadev Award for lifetime achievement and holds a record for winning the Odisha State Film Award for Best Actor six times.
- Babushaan Mohanty; Actor and playback singer who works primarily in the Odia film industry and is the son of veteran actors Uttam Mohanty and Aparajita Mohanty. He has delivered multiple commercially successful romantic and action feature films, winning the Odisha State Film Award for Best Actor.

== Surnames ==
Some titles associated with the Karan caste includes:

Patnaik, Mohanty, Choudhury, Das, Ray, Mohapatra, Samantaray, Routray, Chhotray, Kanungo, Bakshi, Raychoudhury, Bohidar, Srikarana, Dandapata, Das Mahapatra, Parija, Pruseth, Narendra, Mahasenapati, Srichandan, Harichandan, Bebarta, Mangaraj, Samantasinghar, Badajena, Behera, Pattajoshi, Paricha etc.

== See also ==
- Madala Panji, a chronicle of Jagannath Temple written by Karanas.
- Bhoi dynasty, a medieval Hindu dynasty founded by Govinda Vidyadhara.
- Athgarh State, a Princely state founded by Raja Niladri Bhagirathi Barman Pattanayak.
- Bissamcuttack kingdom, founded by Mallu Mohanty in 17th century.
- Karani Script, an Odia Script introduced by Karanas, it was primarily used for court, land, temple, and accounting records as well as other administrative purposes.
- Chandraseniya Kayastha Prabhu
- Bengali Kayastha
- Karanam
