= Palit =

Palit may refer to:

- Palit (company), a Taiwanese electronics company
- Palit (surname), a Bengali surname
- Palit, Croatia, a village on Rab
