= Routray =

Routray/Rautara (Odia: ରାଉତରାୟ) is a surname found in Odisha used mainly by Khandayat and Karan Caste, Deula Karana servitors of Jagannath Temple, Puri belonging to Karana community mainly use titles like "Samantray", "Rautray", "Mangaraj" etc. Deula Karana attendants of Karan caste were the Chief Temple Superintendents of Jagannath Temple, Puri during the Bhoi rule of Khordha under the Bhoi kings.

== Notable people ==
- Madhab Chandra Routray, Indian leader who led a revolt against the British East India Company
- Bijayshree Routray, Indian politician
- Nilamani Routray, Indian politician
- Sachidananda Routray, Indian Odia-language literary figure
- Samaresh Routray, Indian film actor, producer and television personality
- Supriya Routray, Indian footballer
