= Kanjilalia =

Scientific classification
- Kingdom: Plantae
- Clade: Tracheophytes
- Clade: Angiosperms
- Clade: Eudicots
- Clade: Rosids
- Order: Fabales
- Family: Fabaceae
- Genus: Kanjilalia; Sanjappa & Pusalkar

Species
- Kanjilalia griffithii (Benth.) Sanjappa & Pusalkar; Kanjilalia umbrosa (Wall.) Sanjappa & Pusalkar

Genus of flowering plants

Kanjilalia is a genus of flowering plants in the family Fabaceae. It includes two species native to the Andaman Islands, Bangladesh, northeastern India, Myanmar, and western Yunnan Province in China.

Two species are accepted.

- Kanjilalia griffithii (Benth.) Sanjappa & Pusalkar
- Kanjilalia umbrosa (Wall.) Sanjappa & Pusalkar

The genus was named in honour of Upendra Nath Kanjilal (1859–1928), an Indian botanist and forest officer, "for his unparalleled contribution in plant exploration and documentation of the flora of Northeast India (erstwhile Assam), published as Flora of Assam."
