= Mohapatra =

Hindu family surname from Odisha, India

Mahapatra, Mohapatra, or Mahapatro (Odia: ମହାପାତ୍ର) is originally a Hindu family surname belonging to the Indian state of Odisha. It can be found among the Utkala Brahmins and the Karana community.

== Notable people ==
- Shantanu Mohapatra (1936–2020), Indian musician, singer, and composer
- Jayanta Mahapatra (born 1928), Indian writer and poet
- Siddhanta Mahapatra (born 1966), Indian actor
- Sitakant Mahapatra (born 1937), Indian poet
- Jadumani Mahapatra (1781–1868), Indian poet
- Kelucharan Mohapatra (1926–2004), Indian dancer
- Manmohan Mahapatra (1951–2020), Indian filmmaker, director, producer, and writer
- Pyarimohan Mohapatra (1940–2017), Indian bureaucrat and politician
- Souvik Mahapatra, Indian engineer
- Sona Mohapatra (born 1976), Indian singer
- Nirad Mohapatra (1947–2015), Indian film director
- Nityananda Mohapatra (1912–2012), Indian writer
- Ramesh Prasad Mohapatra (1939–1989), Indian historian and archaeologist
- Rabindra Mohapatra (born 1944), Indian theoretical physicist
- Raghunath Mohapatra (1943–2021), Indian architect, sculptor, and politician
- Bibhu Mohapatra (born 1972), Indian fashion designer
- Bijoy Mohapatra (born 1950), Indian politician
- Bhagirathi Mahapatra (born 1892), Indian politician and social reformer
