= Madhavi Pattanayak =

Poet in the Oriya language

- Born: Bentapura, Puri District
- Occupation: Poet
- Writing career
- Language: Odia
- Subject: Religious Poetry

Madhavi Pattanayak (or Madhavi Davi, Madhavi Dasi, Madhavi Das, 16th-century CE) was one of the earliest female poets to write in the Odia language. She was a disciple of Sri Chaitanya and a contemporary of the famous Pancha Sakha poets in the late fifteenth and early sixteenth centuries.

== Early life and family ==
Madhavi Pattayanak was born in a well known Karan family in Bentapura, a village of the Puri district. After becoming a widow at a young age, Pattayanak began to live with her cousin Ramananda Ray, who was the governor of Rajahmundry. During this period, Pattayanak, Ramananda, and Pattayanak's brother Sikhi Mohanty all became followers of Sri Chaitanya Mahaprabhu.

== Literary works ==
Pattayanak was devoted to the god Jagannath. She wrote religious poetry in the mid-16th century.
