= Brajanath Badajena =

18th-century Odia writer

- Born: Brajanath Patnaik; 1729; Dhenkanal, Odisha, India
- Died: 1799 (aged 69–70); Puri
- Writing career
- Language: Odia
- Genres: Poetry, Fictional Prose
- Notable works: Samara Taranga, Chatura Binoda
- Notable awards: Kabi Bhusana
- Literary movement: Riti Juga

Brajanath Badajena (1729–1799) was an Odia poet best known for his historical ballad Samara Taranga. He was born in Dhenkanal. Brajanath was patronized by several local rulers. His work was Samara Taranga appreciated the king of Dhenkanal for which he was given the title of Badajena.

== Family ==
Brajanath Badajena was born Brajanath Patnaik to Balukeswar Patnaik in a Karan family. His family were descendants of 16th century poet Raghu Arakhita. He had three siblings who were serving the king of Dhenkanal. He was well versed in many languages such as Sanskrit, Prakrit, Hindi, Bengali and Telugu.

== Writing ==
His major works were before introduction of printing press in Odisha. So all of his works are found in the form of Palm leaf manuscript. He has experimented with different forms of and styles of writing. He wrote Chatura Binoda (English translation "Four Tales of amusement" ) around 1770. This is regarded as one of the earliest Odia Fictional prose. The main story of this work is the romance between a prince and a rich merchant's daughter. There are several stories that follow when these 2 characters meet which in turn have more subplots. This form of fiction writing was not new but the usage of language makes it a nearly modern work.

His magnum opus is Samara Taranga (English translation "Wave of war"), ballad written on Maratha -Dhenkanal war of 1781. He was an eyewitness to the battles and the poem is a testimony to the events. It has been historically accurate as the events and places mentioned have been corroborated by other sources. The king of Dhenkanal was pleased with his work and granted him a village named Nuagaon near the river Brahmani.

His known works are listed below

=== Odia Poems and Ballads ===
- Ambika Bilasa
- Bidesha Anuchinta
- Bichakshana
- Chandi Malasri
- Dasapoi
- Gopi Bilapa
- Kelikalanidhi
- Rajananku Chalokti
- Janana O Sangeeta
- Rajasabha
- Samara Taranga
- Syamarasotsava

=== Odia Prose ===
- Chatura Binoda

=== Hindi Poem ===
- Gundicha Bije

== Later life ==
While a gifted poet/author he has had a difficult life. He was patronized by many kings such as Dhenkanal, Keonjhar. He however moved around from place to place to earn a livelihood. He spent later part of his life at Puri during the reign of Gajapati DibyaSimha Deva II .

== See also ==
- List of Indian poets
