= Raja Arjun Singh =

King of Porahat

- Born: 1829
- Died: 1890 (aged 60–61)
- Title: Raja of Porahat (Singhbhum)
- Father: Raja Achyut Singh

Raja Arjun Singh (1829 – 1890) was a prominent leader of the Indian Rebellion of 1857 in Singhbhum. He served as the Raja of Porahat zamindari estate in Singhbhum, (now in West Singhbhum, Jharkhand). Arjun Singh had great influence over Kols (also called Hos) who looked upon him with the "reverence due to the deity". He was the son of Raja Achyut Singh. During his rule the Dewan was Jagabandhu Patnaik (Jaggu Dewan).
