= Souvik Mahapatra =

Indian electrical engineer

Souvik Mahapatra is a professor of electrical engineering at Indian Institute of Technology Bombay (IIT Bombay) and Fellow of the Institute of Electrical and Electronics Engineers (IEEE) for contributions to "CMOS transistor gate stack reliability".
