= Mohanty =

Mohanty (Odia: ମହାନ୍ତି) is a Odia surname native to Odisha used by Karan community, it is also used in neighbouring states of Odisha such as Andhra Pradesh, Chhattisgarh and Telangana.

== Notable people ==
- Akshaya Mohanty (1937–2002), a music personality from Odisha, India
- Anubhav Mohanty, a movie star from Odisha, India
- Babushaan Mohanty, an Ollywood star
- Bijay Mohanty (1950–2020), an Indian actor
- Byomakesh Mohanty (1957–2010), an Indian artist and academic
- Chandi Prasad Mohanty, Vice chief of Army staff
- Chandra Talpade Mohanty (born 1955), a postcolonial and transnational feminist theorist
- Debashish Mohanty (born 1976), an Indian cricketer
- Deepak Mohanty, the executive director at the head office of RBI, Mumbai
- Durga Charan Mohanty (1912–1985), a dharmic writer
- Gopinath Mohanty (1914–1991), a novelist
- Indrajit Mahanty, Chief Justice of Rajasthan high court
- Jagadish Mohanty (born 1951), a fiction writer
- Jitendra Nath Mohanty, a professor emeritus at Temple University
- Leena Mohanty (born 1972), leading exponent of Odissi dance
- Rituraj Mohanty, the winner of 2014 edition of India's Raw Star
- Sanghamitra Mohanty (1953–2021), Indian computer scientist
- Saraju Mohanty, professor at the University of North Texas (UNT) in Denton, Texas
- Surendra Mohanty (1922–1990), Odia writer and Politician
- Uttam Mohanty (1958–2025), Indian film and television actor
