= Birakishore Das =

Revolutionary poet

- Born: 23 November 1898; Punanga, British India (now in Jagatsinghpur, Odisha)
- Died: 28 April 1973 (aged 74)
- Occupations: Poet; Social activist; Politician
- Spouse: Sarada Sundari Dei
- Children: 4 (3 daughter, 1 son)
- Writing career
- Language: Odia
- Notable works: • Mo Desha • Mohana Banshi • Rana Dunduvi

Birakishore Das (23 November 1898 – 28 April 1973), popularly known as "Jatiya Kabi Birakishore" (lit. National Poet, Birakishore) was a poet, social activist and politician from Odisha. Best known for the editor of " Mo Desha" a monthly magazine.

== Early life ==
Birakishore Das was born on 23 November 1898 in a Zamindar Vaishnav Karan family at Punanga village of Cuttack district (now in Jagatsinghpur). He completed his matriculation at Victoria high School, Cuttack and later worked in the co-operative department of Odisha. After five years of service, he joined Non-cooperation movement in 1921.

== Works ==
He was very famous during the time of freedom struggle for his patriotic songs, directed against the British rule and inspired thousands numbers of peoples. His first publication " Mohana Banshi", a compilation of national songs, was prescribed by the British government. He wrote poems to be recited in public meetings and in processions. for his poems against British empire he was imprisoned several times by British government. Among them " Bijuli Bati", " Mohana Bansi", " Sabuja", "Sarathi", "Bidrohi Vina", "Bana Bheri", "Rana Dunduvi" and "Ari Ferinahin Yuddha Sarinahin" are some of his popular collection.

In 1947 he edited and published a children's magazine " Mo Desha" (My Country) from Cuttack to inculcate love for the motherland among the children, which influenced and inspired a number of writers.

== Personal life ==
He was married to Sarada Sundari Dei and they had 3 daughters and a son.

== Later life ==
In 1957 by election at Jagatsinghpur, he was elected as a legislator (1957-1961) and 1961 to till death (1973) worked as the secretary of Odisha Syllabus and text book committee. He was pioneer in publishing suitable text books and got awards from the Government of India.
