= Upendranath Kanjilal =

Indian botanist and forest officer (1859-1928)

Upendra Nath Kanjilal, Upendranath Kanjilal or U.N. Kanjilal (1859–1928) was an Indian botanist and forest officer. He published numerous botanical works. He was given the title of Rai Bahadur in 1911.

Kanjilal was born in 1859 to a family who advised King Adi Sura of the Gauda Kingdom. He studied at the Mahratta School in Jessore, the Hetrampur school in Birbhum and the Presidency College in Calcutta followed by the Imperial Forest School at Dehra Dun. He became a forest officer and rose to the position of Extra Deputy Conservator of Forests. He was elected Fellow of the Linnean Society in 1902. He died in 1928 while he was working on the Flora of Assam. The work was completed by his son P. C. Kanjilal (Praphulla Chandra Kanjilal) a forest officer serving in Uttar Pradesh.

The genus Kanjilalia was named in his honour.
