= Laxmikanta Mohapatra =

Indian poet, writer, and freedom fighter

Kantakabi Laxmikanta Mohapatra
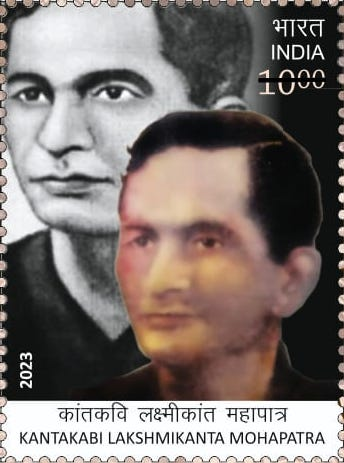
- Mohapatra on a 2023 stamp of India
- Born: Laxmikaanth Mahapatra; 9 December 1888; Bakhrabad Talapada, Tihidi, Bhadrak, Odisha, India
- Died: 24 February 1953 (aged 64); Bhadrak, Odisha, India
- Education: Bachelor of Arts
- Alma mater: Ripon College, Ravenshaw University
- Occupations: Poet, novelist, playwright, performance artist, editor
- Spouse: Labangalata Das
- Children: Nityananda Mohapatra, Goura Chandra Mohapatra
- Parent(s): Choudhury Bhagabat Prasad Samantaray Mohapatra and Radhamani Devi
- Writing career
- Period: Satyabadi Era
- Genres: Poetry, drama, parody, satire, children's literature, essays
- Notable works: Bande Utkala Janani, Kana Mamu, Budha Sankhari

Laxmikanta Mohapatra (9 December 1888 – 24 February 1953), popularly revered as Kantakabi, was a pioneering Indian Odia poet, novelist, playwright, and freedom fighter. Renowned for his nationalistic poetry and sharp social satire, he authored more than ten seminal literary works. Mohapatra was a key architect of the Odisha State Unification Movement and an active organizer within the Utkal Sammilani. He is best known for composing Bande Utkala Janani, which was officially adopted as the state anthem of Odisha in 2020.

== Early life and education ==
Laxmikanta was born on 9 December 1888 into an aristocratic Zamindar Karan family at Talapada village in the Tihidi block of Bhadrak district (then part of the Bengal Presidency). His father, Choudhury Bhagabat Prasad Samantaray Mohapatra, was a prominent public figure who served four terms in the Bihar and Orissa Legislative Council and was twice elected as its deputy speaker. His mother was Radhamani Devi.

Laxmikanta spent a significant part of his childhood at his maternal uncle's residence and completed his primary schooling in Balasore. For higher education, he relocated to Kolkata and enrolled at Ripon College (now Surendranath College). In 1913, he returned to Odisha, joining Ravenshaw College in Cuttack, where he graduated with a Bachelor of Arts degree.

He married Labangalata Das, the daughter of Zamindar Lalmohan Das. At an early stage of his adulthood, Laxmikanta contracted leprosy, which severely impaired his physical mobility. Despite his illness, he remained intensely dedicated to literary composition and political activism.

== Literary life and state unification ==
Mohapatra contributed extensively to Odia literature across diverse genres, including poetry, short stories, novels, parodies, and essays. His writings played a pivotal role in revitalizing the Odia language during a period when its cultural preservation faced administrative threats.

As a socio-political critic, Mohapatra utilized sharp wit and satire to critique contemporary politicians and the feudal aristocracy. He was also a passionate dramatist and performance artist, establishing a village theater troupe called the Gopinath Natya Samaj to promote traditional Odia performing arts.

His patriotic songs, notably Bande Utkala Janani, Koti Koti Kanthe Aji, and Udaee Nisana Bajai Veri, became powerful rallying cries for freedom fighters during the Indian independence movement and the movement for a separate Odisha province. Bande Utkala Janani was first performed as the welcome song at the Balasore session of the Utkal Sammilani. In June 2020, the Government of Odisha formally accorded the song the statutory status of the state anthem.

== Published works ==
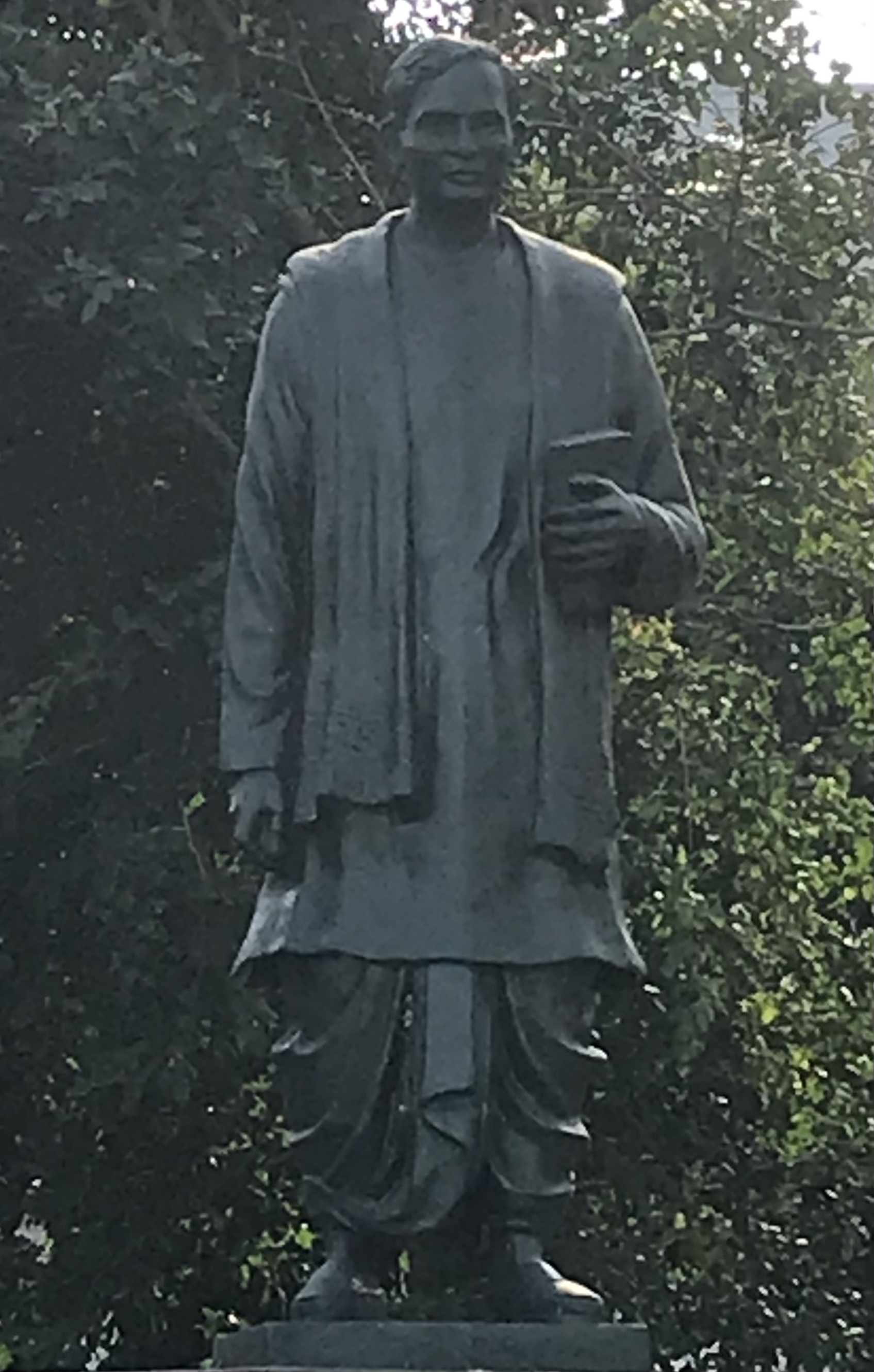
Statue of Laxmikanta Mohapatra in Bhubaneswar

=== Novel ===
- Kana Mamu (The One-Eyed Uncle)

=== Short stories ===
- Budha Sankhari (The Old Bangle Seller)

=== Mythological works ===
- Basanta Bilasa
- Baruna Bijaya
- Kaliyadalana
- Brajabarjana
- Besabadala

=== Plays ===
- Karna
- Kalapahada
- Chandraahasa

=== Children's literature ===
- Chidiakhana
- Dharma Sangeeta
- Balachara
- Sunapua
- Mo Desa

=== Essays ===
- Keisora Swapna
- Joubana Pathe
- Nibhruta Nisithe
- Jibanta Maran

Mohapatra was also the founder-editor of the influential literary journal Dagara, which served as a major platform for contemporary social commentary, political satire, and children's literature in Odisha.
