= Bande Utkala Janani =

State anthem of Odisha state in India

Bandē Utkaḷa Jananī
English: I Adore Thee, O Mother Utkala
- ବନ୍ଦେ ଉତ୍କଳ ଜନନୀ
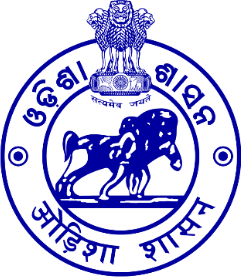
- Emblem of Odisha
- State anthem of Odisha
- Lyrics: Laxmikanta Mohapatra, 1912
- Music: Gokul Mohanty, 1932 (arranged by Balakrushna Dash)
- Adopted: 1994 (de facto); 7 June 2020 (de jure)

Audio sample
- Bandē Utkaḷa Jananī (2023): file; help

Bandē Utkaḷa Jananī is an Odia patriotic poem written by Laxmikanta Mohapatra in 1912. Odisha became the first state in British India to be formed on linguistic basis on 1 April 1936. The music was first recorded by Gokul Mohanty in 1932. The modern notation was arranged by the Odissi musician Balakrushna Dash which was adopted as the state anthem. The Odisha Cabinet on 7 June 2020, accorded the poem the status as the Anthem of Odisha.

== History ==
This song was first sung at the Utkal Sammilani's Conference at Balasore in 1912. It was used as a weapon by the Utkal Sammilani to emancipate Odisha. In a meeting at Bhadrak, where the poet Mohapatra was felicitated, the then young leader of Odisha Harekrushna Mahtab admitted that the poet Laxmikanta's patriotic songs have inspired him a lot. In the past, outsiders like Mughals, Marathas and Britishers ruled Odisha and its geographical boundaries changed from time to time accordingly.

The poem envisages a Utkala who maintains her self-respect and dignity from a position of confidence and strength rather than insecurity and fear. This movement for a separate province also gathered momentum in Odisha. The Utkal Sammilani (a federation of Odias) was leading this movement. This influenced the poet Laxmikanta Mohapatra, who was then young and energetic. He started writing Bande Utkala Janani (Glory To The Mother Utkala!) and some other fiery songs with a patriotic motive. Well, known national poet of Odisha Banchhanidhi Mohanty was also a good singer. He used to sing Laxmikanta's patriotic songs throughout Odisha and inspired everyone. Once Rabindra Nath Tagore wrote in one of his essays i.e. "A Vision of India's History" that 'the history of India has been the history of a struggle between the mechanical spirit of conformity in social organization and the creative spirit of man which seeks freedom and love in self-expression' justifies Laxmikanta as a true patriotic poet.

== Adoption ==
In the early 1990s, the then Chief Minister of Odisha Biju Patnaik requested the then Speaker of Odisha Legislative Assembly Yudhistir Das that the adoption of the song be played at the end of the Assembly Session. In 1994, at an all-party meeting presided by Das, the song was adopted to be played and sung at the valedictory session of the Odisha Legislative Assembly.

In 2020, a state cabinet meeting chaired by Chief Minister Naveen Patnaik gave state song status to the poem. This came after Patnaik encouraged the recitation of Bande Utkala Janani to boost the morale of healthcare workers fighting the coronavirus outbreak.

== Lyrics ==
Odia original	ISO-15919 Romanization	English translation
ବନ୍ଦେ ଉତ୍କଳ ଜନନୀ ଚାରୁ ହାସମୟୀ ଚାରୁ ଭାଷମୟୀ, ଜନନୀ, ଜନନୀ, ଜନନୀ । ପୂତ-ପୟୋଧି-ବିଧୌତ-ଶରୀରା ତାଳତମାଳ-ସୁଶୋଭିତ-ତୀରା ଶୁଭ୍ରତଟିନୀକୂଳ-ଶୀକର-ସମୀରା ଜନନୀ, ଜନନୀ, ଜନନୀ ।। ଘନ ଘନ ବନଭୂମି ରାଜିତ ଅଙ୍ଗେ, ନୀଳ ଭୂଧରମାଳା ସାଜେ ତରଙ୍ଗେ, କଳ କଳ ମୁଖରିତ ଚାରୁ ବିହଙ୍ଗେ ଜନନୀ, ଜନନୀ, ଜନନୀ ।। ସୁନ୍ଦରଶାଳି-ସୁଶୋଭିତ-କ୍ଷେତ୍ରା, ଜ୍ଞାନବିଜ୍ଞାନ-ପ୍ରଦର୍ଶିତ-ନେତ୍ରା, ଯୋଗୀଋଷିଗଣ-ଉଟଜ-ପବିତ୍ରା ଜନନୀ, ଜନନୀ, ଜନନୀ ।। ସୁନ୍ଦର ମନ୍ଦିର ମଣ୍ଡିତ-ଦେଶା ଚାରୁକଳାବଳି-ଶୋଭିତ-ବେଶା ପୁଣ୍ୟ ତୀର୍ଥଚୟ-ପୂର୍ଣ୍ଣ-ପ୍ରଦେଶା ଜନନୀ, ଜନନୀ, ଜନନୀ ।। ଉତ୍କଳ ସୁରବର-ଦର୍ପିତ-ଗେହା, ଅରିକୁଳ-ଶୋଣିତ-ଚର୍ଚ୍ଚିତ-ଦେହା, ବିଶ୍ୱଭୂମଣ୍ଡଳ-କୃତବର-ସ୍ନେହା ଜନନୀ, ଜନନୀ, ଜନନୀ ।। କବିକୁଳମୌଳି ସୁନନ୍ଦନ-ବନ୍ଦ୍ୟା, ଭୁବନବିଘୋଷିତ-କୀର୍ତ୍ତିଅନିନ୍ଦ୍ୟା, ଧନ୍ୟେ, ପୁଣ୍ୟେ, ଚିରଶରଣ୍ୟେ ଜନନୀ, ଜନନୀ, ଜନନୀ ।।	Bandē utkaḷa jananī Cāru hāsamayī cāru bhāṣamayī, Jananī, jananī, jananī ! Pūta-payōdhi-bidhauta-śarīrā, Tāḷatamāḷa-suśōbhita-tīrā, Śubhrataṭinīkūḷa-śīkara-samīrā; Jananī, jananī, jananī ! Ghana ghana banabhūmi rājita aṅgē, Nīḷa bhūdharamāḷā sāje taraṅgē, Kaḷa kaḷa mukharita cāru bihaṅgē Jananī, jananī, jananī ! Sundaraśāḷi-suśōbhita-kṣetrā, Jñānabijñāna-pradarśita-netrā, Ẏōgīr̥ṣigaṇa-uṭaja-pabitrā; Jananī, jananī, jananī ! Sundara mandira maṇḍita-deśā, Cārukaḷābaḷi-śobhita-beśā, Puṇya tīrthacaya-pūrṇṇa-pradeśā Jananī, jananī, jananī ! Utkaḷa surabara-darpita-gēhā, Arikuḷa-śoṇita-carccita-dēhā, Biśwabhūmaṇḍaḷa-kr̥tabara-snēhā; Jananī, jananī, jananī ! Kabikuḷamauḷi sunandana-bandyā, Bhubanabighōṣita-kīrttianindyā, Dhanyē, puṇyē ciraśaraṇyē Jananī, jananī, jananī !	I adore Thee, O Mother Utkala! How loving are thy smile and voice! O Mother! Mother! Mother! Bath’d art Thou by the sacred Sea, Thy shores adorned with trees tall and green, Balmy breeze blowing by beauteous streams, O Mother! Mother! Mother! Thy body bedeck’d with dense woodlands, Arrayed with verdant hills plaited like waves, Thy sky ringing with choirs of singing birds, O Mother! Mother! Mother! How charming are Thy rich fields of paddy! Thou art Eye to Erudition enow, Sacred Abode to saints and seers, O Mother! Mother! Mother! Thy land bejewelled with splendid temples, Richly dress'd art Thou in varied arts, Thy limbs studded with sacred sites, O Mother! Mother! Mother! Thou Home to the valiant heroes of Utkala, Thy frame crimsoned with enemies' blood, Prime Darling of the whole universe, O Mother! Mother! Mother! Greeted by Thy great sons, the crowning bards, Thy untarnished glory proclaimed all around, Blessed art Thou, the Holy, the Unfalling Abode! O Mother! Mother! Mother!

== See also ==
- List of Indian state songs
