= Janana =

Coordinates: 29.2126724°N 75.2836418°E

Janana is a village in the municipality of Bhadra, Hanumangarh district, in the Indian state of Rajasthan.

== Overview ==
Janana contains approximately 750 houses and has a population of approximately 6,500, primarily Jat. No Muslims, Christians, or people holding the title of Thakur are permitted to enter the village. People of various Jat gotras (sub-castes), such as Bhawaria, Saharan, Soni, Fageria, Jhajharia, Dhaka, Tetarwal, Sheoran and Godara (Meghwal) reside in Janana.

Constructed in 1958, the Amar Singh Branch Canal passes through and provides water to Janana. The village has a private elementary school, K.C.M. Modern School, and two public secondary schools, one of which is female-only.

Hinduism plays a prominent role in village life: Janana is the location of the locally renowned Samadhi Baba temple, which people visit seeking cures for animal and human afflictions. Located nearby are other Hindu temples such as Hanuman Mandir, Shyam Baba Mandir, Ramdev-ji, Bhomia-ji, Jhoojhar, Kali Mata, Bhairav-ji, Shiv Mandir, and Ram Sita Lakshman Mandir. Shri Balaji Seva Samiti is being constructed by local residents for visitors.

A large fair is held on the Davitiya of each Shukla Paksha in Janana, and a smaller one is held on each Thursday.
