= Malik Rihan Dargah, Sira =

Malik Rihan Tomb, Sira
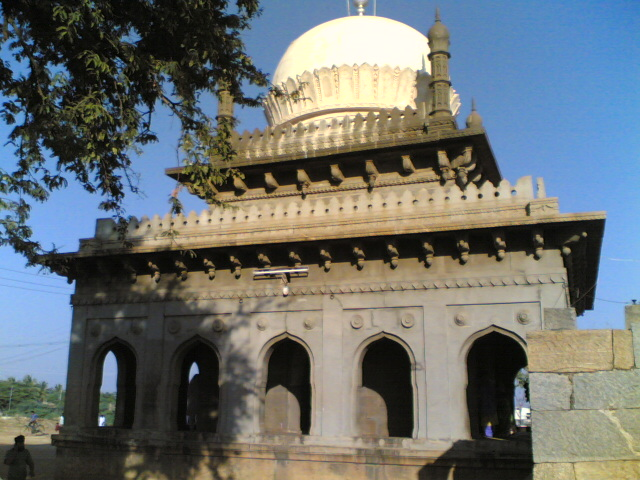

- Location in Karnataka, India

Religion
- Affiliation: Islam
- District: Tumakuru district
- Year consecrated: 1651 CE

Location
- Location: Sira, India
- State: Karnataka
- Interactive map of Malik Rihan Tomb, Sira
- Coordinates: 13°44′06.3″N 76°54′31.9″E

Architecture
- Type: Tomb

Malik Rihan Dargah, also known as Malik Rihan tomb, is a mausoleum in Sira, Karnataka, India. It contains the grave of Malik Rihan who was the governor of Sira province in the 17th-century. It has a square plan and illustrates the Indo-Saracenic style in Deccan architecture.

== Location ==
The tomb is located in the Sira town which is a taluk in Tumkur District in the Province of Sira in the Indian State of Karnataka. It is a municipal town on the National Highway (NH-48) (from Bangalore to Pune), and is 123 kilometres (76 mi) away from Bangalore.

== History ==
Sira was near the eastern edge of the region under the control of the Bijapur Sultans from 1638 to 1687, before Aurangzeb dismissed them and expanded the Mughal empire. Sira was also the place where Hyder Ali began his career, before seeking employment with the Wodeyars and later organizing a coup to dismiss them to found the Mysore Sultanate. His son Tipu Sultan forced the relocation of most Muslims from Sira to a new town he founded on the island of Seringapatam. This led to a large decline of Sira.

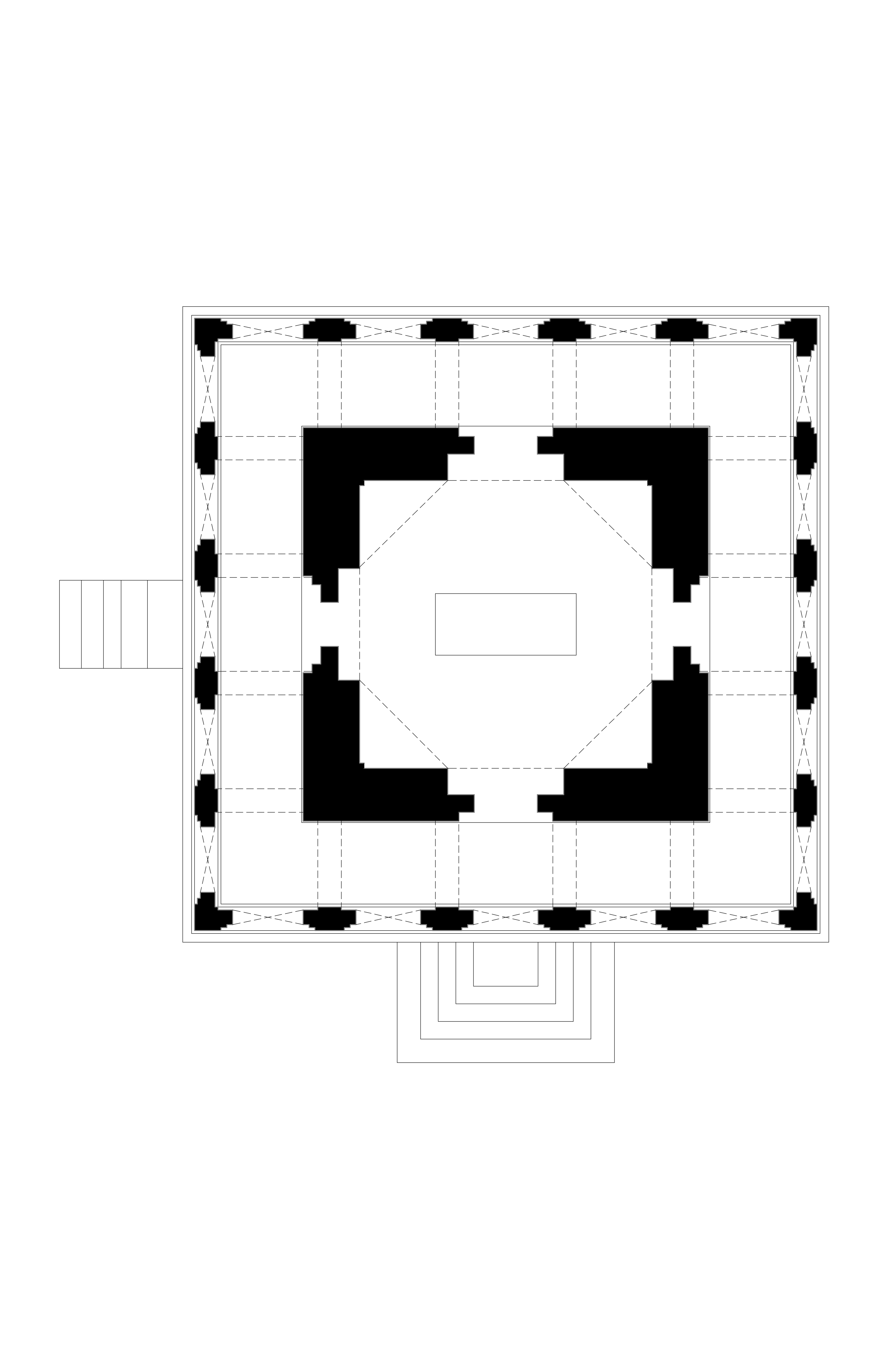
Floor plan of the Malik Rihan dargah.

While under the control of Bijapur Sultanate, Malik Rihan was appointed the Subahdar (governor) of Sira by the Adil Shahis from 1638 to 1651. This mausoleum was completed in 1651, over his tomb.

In October 2012, under the High Court order, the Hazrath Malik Rehan Dargah- Wakf was brought under Section 65 of the Wakf Act, 1995 by the Karnataka State.

== Features ==
The mausoleum built in 1651 in Mudéjar style has a square plan. It has a central hall, with a sheltered arcade with sculpted brackets. The dome on the top is "three quarters hemispherical" with Adil Shahi-style "domical finials". It illustrates the Saracenic style.

The tomb, which is a protected monument under the Archaeological Survey of India (ASI), is located close to the Jama Masjid, Sira.

== Other structures ==
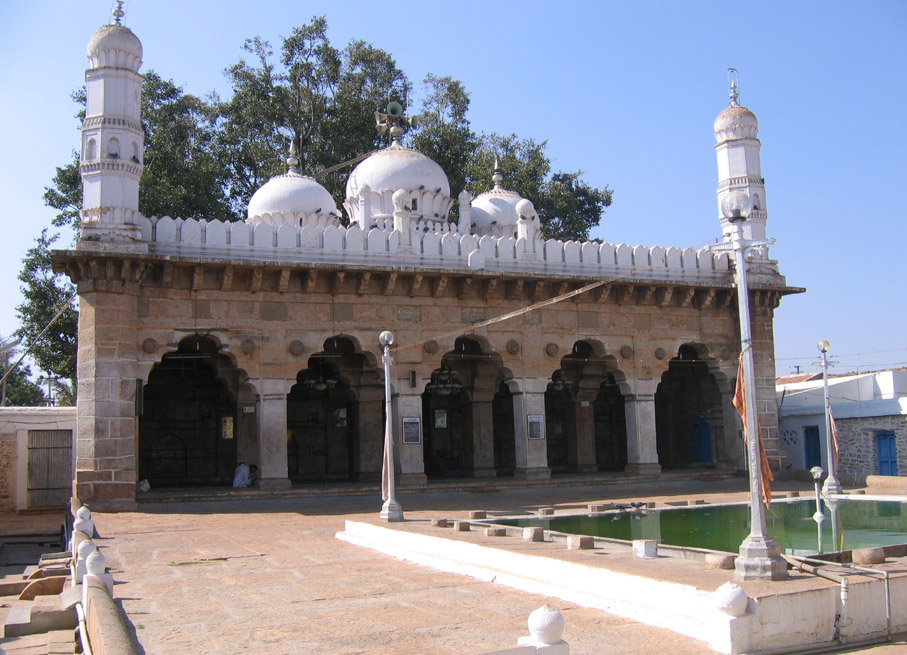
Juma Masjid nearby

Apart from the Kasturi Rangappa Nayaka Fort, the Juma Masjid close to the tomb was built in 1696. The masjid is decorated with five arches in the facade. Ornamented parapet walls are built above the arches. The roof of the masjid is made up of three domes.
