= Chautisa =

Genre of Indian literature

Chautisa or Chautisha (Odia: ଚଉତିଶା) is a genre of literary composition in Indian literature. It was popular form of writing in medieval Indian poetry. It is a form of constrained writing where each verse begins with consecutive letters of the alphabet, typically starting with the first consonant. The word 'Chautisa' means thirty four, signifying the number of consonants in Odia script.

== History ==
Chautisa is one of the earliest form of poetry in Odia language. Numerous Chautisas have been written in medieval Odia literature. The Prachi Samiti (1925–34) collected and published four volumes of medieval poetry and contains hundreds of Chautisas. The earliest known Chautisa is the Kesaba koili of Markanda Dasa.

Baladeba Ratha, Banamali Dasa, Dinakrushna Dasa are some of the most famous poets who wrote Chautisas.

== Structure ==
Typically the poetry starts with the letter କ and ends with କ୍ଷ. Each verse or line of each couplet starts with the same letter.

Kamalalochana Chautisha, Balarama Dasa	Transliteration
କମଳ ଲୋଚନ ଶ୍ରୀହରି। କରେଣ ଶଙ୍ଖ ଚକ୍ରଧାରୀ॥ ଖଗ ଆସନେ ଖଗପତି। ଖଟନ୍ତି ଲକ୍ଷ୍ମୀ ସରସ୍ୱତୀ॥ ଗରୁଡ଼ ଆସନେ ମୁରାରି। ଗୋପରେ ରଖିଲେ ବାଛୁରୀ॥	Kamala lochana srihari; karena sankha chakradhaari. Khaga aasane khagapati; khatanti Laxmi Saraswati. Garuda aasane Murari; gopare rakhile baachuri.

There are some poetic liberties taken by the poets. Such as in place of the letter ଙ/ଞ, words beginning with ନ are used as there are no words that begin with those letters.

Some poets reverse the order of the letters and wrote starting from କ୍ଷ and ends with କ. This is called Olata Chautisa.

Typically the Chautisas have 34 couplets/stanzas. Other popular variants include:

- Chautisa with 2 couplets – each couplet containing 17 consonants.
- Chautisa with 3 couplets – two couplets containing 12 consonants and one couplet with 10 consonants.
- Chautisa with 6 couplets – E.g. Chitau chautisa by Upendra Bhanja.
- Chautisa with 9 couplets – E.g. Hanumanta Janana Chautisa by Damodara Dasa.
