= Karani script =

Writing system for the Odia language of India

Karani script Karaṇī akṣara କରଣି ଅକ୍ଷର
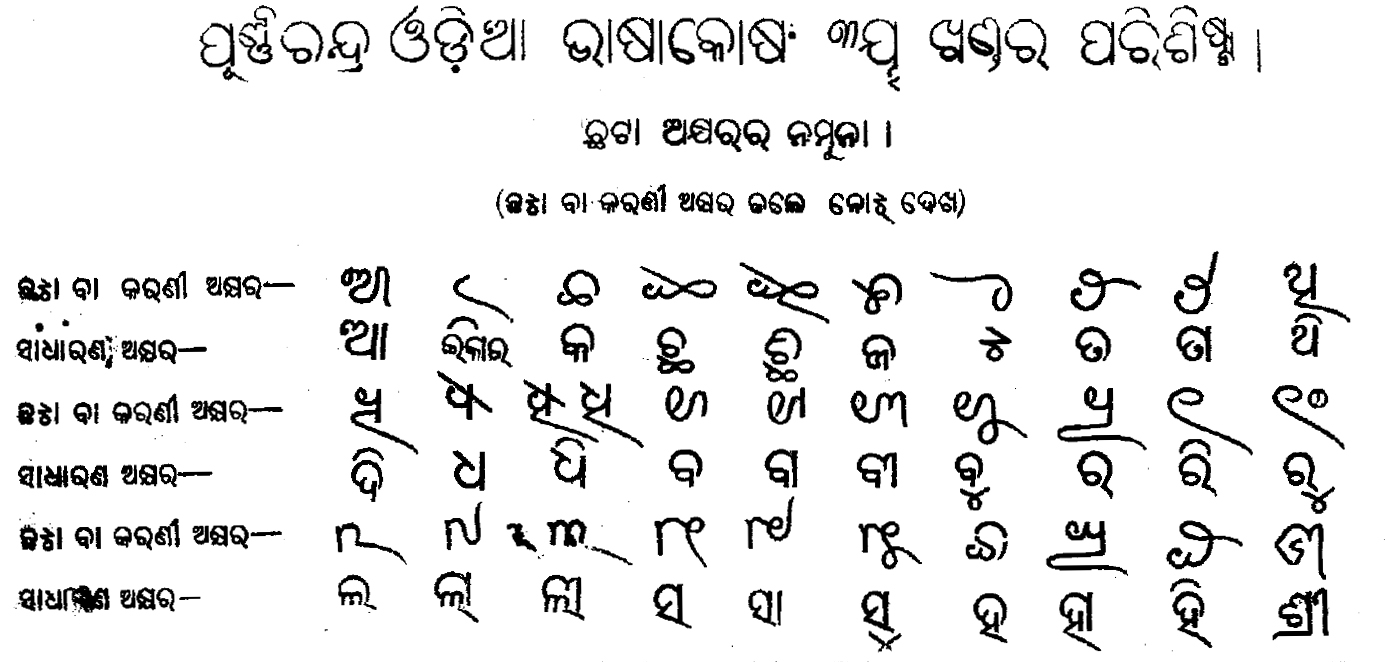
- Karani script sample from Purnachandra Odia Bhashakosha
- Script type: Abugida
- Period: c. 1700 - 1900s CE
- Languages: Odia language

Related scripts
- Parent systems: Odia script (cursive style): Karani script

Karani or Chhata was a handwritten cursive writing system historically used to write the Odia language primarily for court, land, temple and accounting records, and other administrative purposes. Karani was quite different from the printed form, the Odia script, which replaced it. Karani gradually became unintelligible to the readers of the latter. The writers historically belonged to the Karan caste group who were designated to use Karani. The script was used in the Odia-speaking regions during British Raj including the Orissa Tributary States. Both the names "karani" and "karana" are derived from "karani", a metal stylus used for writing on palm leaf. Karani script was considered popular in Odisha predating the reign of Prataparudra Deva of Gajapati Empire, it got its modern form in 16th century. Historical records from mid-eighteenth century were also written in this script primarily of the Khurda Bhoi Kingdom. Karani was written both on palm leaves and paper. Bhoimuls (Accountants) of Khurda Kingdom primarily used Karani script for writing and preparing documents for administrative purposes.

== History ==
Karani is often explained as "karaninabaja" or "chhata", a "running" script introduced by the Karanas, most of the old Odia palm leaf manuscripts were written in Karani, the script is less standard by modern terms or it could be described as a form of Odia script before it was standardised. The script did not use spaces between words with less punctuation marks which made it hard to decipher.

== Influence on modern Odia script ==
Karani diacritic remnant in Odia script
| Vowel Letter | Diacritic forms |
|---|---|
| For the vowel ଇ (short i), the standard Odia diacritic form is ି. Eg- For consonant କ (ka) - କି (ki); But for these consonants - ଖ (kha), ଥ (tha), ଧ (dha), the equivalent ଇ diacritic from Karani script is also used. | ଖି (khi) ଥି (thi) ଧି (dhi) |

== Gallery ==
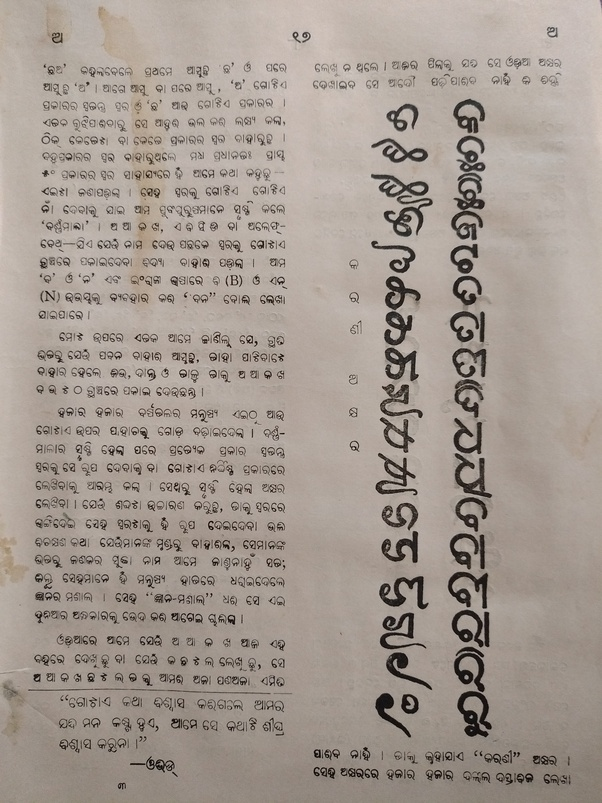
Karani script sample from Jnanamandala

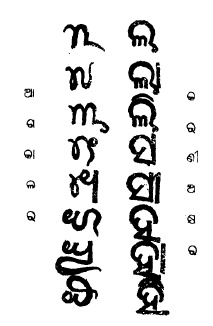
Karani script sample from Jnanamandala

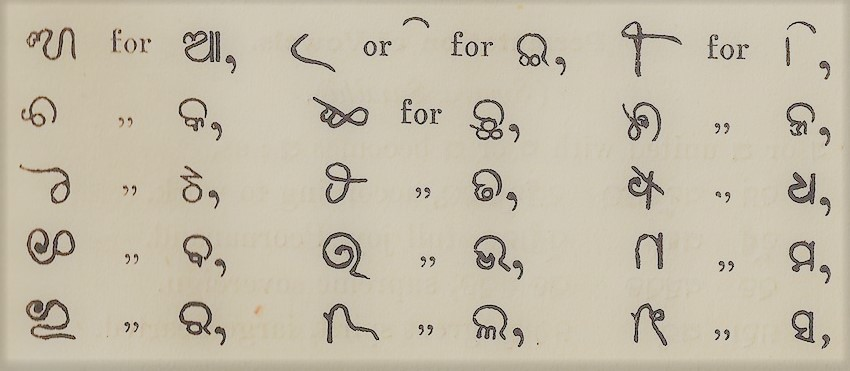
Karani script letters

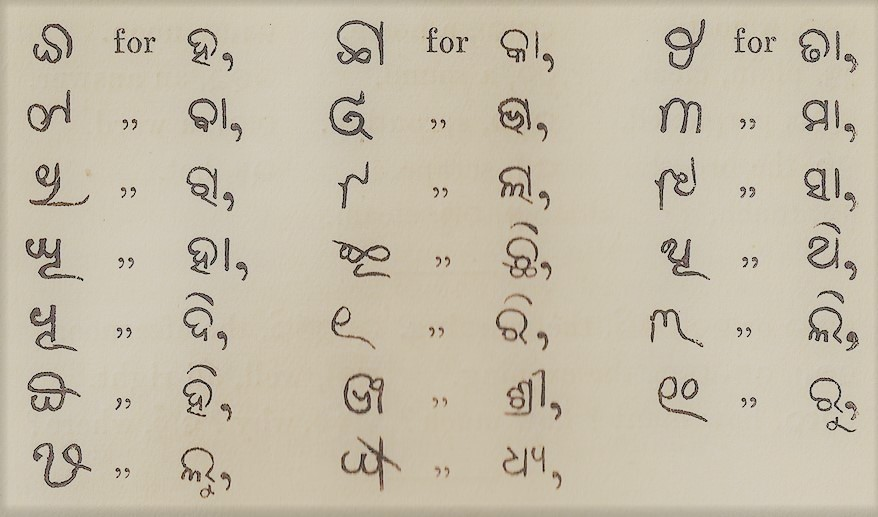
Karani script letters

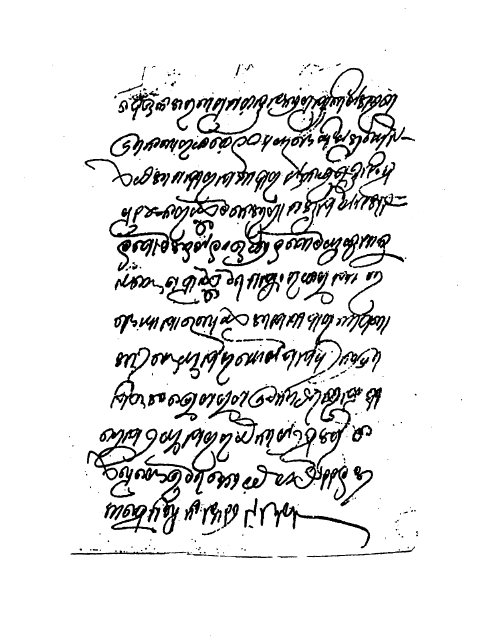
Karani writing
