= Ramananda Ray =

15th–16th century writer, minister and governor of Suryavamsha Gajapati Empire

Ramananda Ray Patnaik Pariksha, Raja
- ରାମାନନ୍ଦ ରାୟ ପଟ୍ଟନାୟକ
- Born: Ramananda Patnaik; Bentapur, Gajapati Empire (present-day Odisha, India)
- Died: Puri, Gajapati Empire (present-day Odisha, India)
- Occupations: Statesman, Playwright, Governor, Temple Administrator
- Writing career
- Language: Sanskrit, Odia
- Period: Late 15th century – mid-16th century CE
- Genres: Drama, Sanskrit theatre, Devotional literature
- Notable work: Jagannatha Vallabha Natakam

Ramananda Ray Patnaik (IAST: Rāmānanda Rāya; Odia: ରାମାନନ୍ଦ ରାୟ ପଟ୍ଟନାୟକ), known in historical records as Ramananda Raya, was a 15th-16th century military commander, and governor under the Suryavamsha Gajapati Empire of Odisha. He historically served as the Viceroy and Governor of the southern territories at Rajahmundry under Emperor Prataparudra Deva (r. 1497–1540 CE). Within Gaudiya Vaishnavism, he is revered as one of the spiritual companions of Chaitanya Mahaprabhu, with whom he engaged in theological dialogues known through Raya Ramananda Samvada.

== Personal life and lineage ==
Ramananda took birth in an aristocratic Karana family belonging to the village of Bentapur. Bentapur was located near the holy site of Alalaranatha (Brahmagiri), approximately 12 miles west of Puri and adjacent to Chilika Lake. His father, Bhabananda Ray Patnaik, was the Samanta (feudal chief) of Bentapur under the Gajapati crown. Ramananda was the eldest of five brothers, all of whom went on to hold instrumental positions within the Gajapati kingdom:

- Gopinatha Badajena Patnaik: Appointed as the Governor of the northern frontier division of Midnapore, managing border defense against external incursions.
- Vaninatha Nayaka Patnaik: Acted as a central institutional officer and personal coordinator for Chaitanya Mahaprabhu's traveling group during their years in Puri.
- Kalanidhi Patnaik and Sudhanidhi Patnaik: Senior revenue officials and state administrators who oversaw provincial treasuries and estate logistics for the Gajapati crown.

The family also shared a close relationship with their cousin sister, Madhavi Pattanayak (commonly known as Madhavi Dasi), a celebrated female poet of medieval Odisha who was the sister of devotees Sikhi Mahiti and Murari Mahiti. Following her early widowhood, she lived under the protection of Ramananda Ray during his governorship in Rajahmundry, later becoming an influential advanced devotee within the inner circle of Chaitanya Mahaprabhu in Puri.

In Gaudiya Vaishnava texts such as Kavi Karnapura's Gaura-ganoddesha-dipika, the family is accorded an elevated spiritual status. Bhabananda is described as the reincarnation of King Pandu, while his five sons are considered personifications of the five Pandava brothers, with Ramananda explicitly identified as the incarnation of Arjuna.

== Military and political career ==
Ramananda's governorship occurred during a critical period of territorial consolidation and border warfare for the Gajapati Empire. Emperor Prataparudra Deva appointed Ramananda Patnaik as the provincial Viceroy or Governor (styled as Raja or Pariksha) of the empire's southern territories. He established his seat of power at Rajahmundry along the banks of the Godavari River and ruled over the southern territories of Gajapati Empire.

Ramananda Raya’s governorship was heavily militaristic, the Dandapatas under his jurisdiction were large imperial provinces comprising entire districts that had large standing armies under his command to defend the empire against the expansionist pushes of the Vijayanagara Empire and the Southern Sultanates. Ramananda's headquarters was an epicentre of great activity as it housed extensive infantry deployments, cavalry squads, and state war elephant blocks under his service. Besides ruling over the territories as governor of the kingdom, his duties also included administering civil justice, overseeing land surveys, and gathering local agrarian revenue. Below the Dandapatas were villages and Fortresses (Simas) along the southern boundaries which also came under the direct jurisdiction of Ramananda Raya. Ramananda Raya had also urged Chaitanya Mahaprabhu to return to Puri without him as being the Governor of the southern territories of the Gajapati kingdom, Ramananda Ray would travel with a large royal entourage of elephants, horses and soldiers creating disruptive and noisy tumult as mentioned in the biography Chaitanya Charitamrita of Chaitanya Mahaprabhu.

== Encounter and dialogues with Chaitanya Mahaprabhu ==
In 1510 CE, during his pilgrimage through Southern India, Chaitanya Mahaprabhu reached the Godavari River near Rajahmundry, acting on a recommendation from the prominent Puri court scholar Sarvabhauma Bhattacharya. Ramananda arrived at the riverbank with his large retinue of ministers, military officials, and Brahmins.

Despite the rigid socio-religious hierarchies of medieval India—wherein Ramananda, as a Karan, was considered a non-Brahmin householder—Chaitanya openly embraced him. This encounter initiated a series of deep theological discussions over several consecutive nights, which were later compiled in Krishnadasa Kaviraja's Chaitanya Charitamrita under the title Raya Ramananda Samvada.

During these conversations, Ramananda systematically explained the progression of bhakti (devotion), demonstrating that pure love (Prema) transcends structural social standing and ritualistic caste duties. According to Gaudiya Vaishnava theology, it was during these exchanges that Chaitanya first revealed his esoteric, combined divine form as Radha and Krishna (Rasaraja-Mahabhava) directly to Ramananda.

== Later life and royal mediation ==
Deeply transformed by his interaction with Chaitanya, Ramananda decided to retire from political life. Despite the ongoing military challenges on the southern frontier, Emperor Prataparudra Deva granted Ramananda's request for voluntary retirement out of respect for his spiritual devotion, allowing him to retain his state stipend.

Ramananda permanently relocated to Puri, where he became an essential mediator between the imperial court and Chaitanya's monastic circle. Because Chaitanya followed strict ascetic vows prohibiting direct audiences with worldly monarchs, Emperor Prataparudra was initially unable to meet him. Ramananda worked closely with Sarvabhauma Bhattacharya to bridge this gap, ultimately helping facilitate the meeting that led the Emperor to become a devoted supporter of Chaitanya's movement.

== Administration of the Jagannath Temple and social reforms ==
Upon his return to Puri, Ramananda was appointed by the crown as a senior Pariksha (chief superintendent and trustee) of the Jagannath Temple, Puri. His administrative tenure left a lasting impact on both temple traditions and local society:

- Cultural and Ritual Reforms: Leveraging his expertise in music and dance, Ramananda personally trained the temple's Maharis (devotional temple dancers) in emotional expression and rhythmic movement, directly shaping early classical Odissi traditions.
- Liturgical Integration: He was instrumental in integrating the musical performance of Jayadeva's Gita Govinda into the temple's night rituals, establishing a tradition that remains part of Lord Jagannath’s daily worship.
- Social Equality: Ramananda used his position as a high-ranking temple administrator to challenge conservative caste restrictions within the temple complex, helping ensure that devotional groups could access spiritual spaces regardless of their social background.

In Chaitanya’s final years, Ramananda and Swarup Damodar served as his closest companions in Puri, supporting the saint through his intense states of devotional ecstasy.

== Literary contributions ==
Ramananda was an accomplished scholar of Sanskrit dramaturgy. His most celebrated work is the five-act Sanskrit drama titled Jagannatha Vallabha Natakam (also known as the Jagannatha-vallabha-nataka). Written in the Sangeet-Natak (musical theatre) style, the play portrays the pastoral pastimes of Radha and Krishna in Vrindavan. It is highly regarded for its elegant lyrical composition, complex metric structures, and emotional depth, mirroring the poetic style of Jayadeva. The songs from this drama were regularly performed in front of Lord Jagannath and served as an important foundational element for the classical Odissi musical repertoire.
