= Palit (surname) =

Origin
- Origin: Bengali Hindu
- Region of origin: Bengal

Palit (Bengali: পালিত) is a native Bengali surname, mostly used by the Bengali Kayastha community of India and Bangladesh. The surname is also found among Baishya Kapali, Ugra Kshatriya, Karmakar, Namasudra and some other castes of Bengal.

== Notable people with the surname ==
- Dibyendu Palit, Indian Bengali poet and writer
- Modhura Palit, Indian cinematographer
- Nityananda Palit, Indian playwright, actor and director
- Sayani Palit, Indian playback singer
- Taraknath Palit, Indian lawyer and philanthropist
