= Ananga Kumar Patnaik =

Former judge of Supreme Court of India (2009-2014)

Hon'ble Justice (Retd.) Ananga Kumar Patnaik
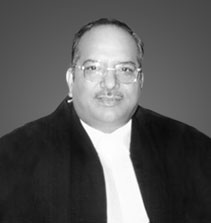

Judge of Supreme Court of India
- In office 17 November 2009 – 2 June 2014
- Nominated by: K. G. Balakrishnan
- Appointed by: Pratibha Patil

19th Chief Justice of Madhya Pradesh High Court
- In office 2 October 2005 – 16 November 2009
- Nominated by: R. C. Lahoti
- Appointed by: A. P. J. Abdul Kalam
- Preceded by: R. V. Raveendran; Deepak Verma (acting)
- Succeeded by: Syed Rafat Alam; R. S. Garg (acting)

4th Chief Justice of Chhattisgarh High Court
- In office 14 March 2005 – 1 October 2005
- Nominated by: R. C. Lahoti
- Appointed by: A. P. J. Abdul Kalam
- Preceded by: A. S. V. Moorthy; Fakhruddin (acting)
- Succeeded by: S. R. Nayak; Fakhruddin (acting)

Judge of Orissa High Court
- In office 15 April 2002 – 13 March 2005
- Nominated by: S. P. Bharucha
- Appointed by: K. R. Narayanan
- In office 13 January 1994 – 6 February 1994
- Nominated by: M. N. Venkatachaliah
- Appointed by: S. D. Sharma

Judge of Gauhati High Court
- In office 7 February 1994 – 14 April 2002
- Nominated by: M. N. Venkatachaliah
- Appointed by: S. D. Sharma

Personal details
- Born: 3 June 1949 (age 77)
- Parent: Gopal Chandra Patnaik
- Education: Rajkumar College, Raipur, Madhusudan Law College, Delhi University

Ananga Kumar Patnaik (born 3 June 1949) is an Indian jurist and a former judge of the Supreme Court of India.

== Early life and education ==
Patnaik was born on 3 June 1949 in a noble Karan family. He is the son of Gopal Chandra Patnaik, an Indian businessman and Shantilata Patnaik. He did his schooling from Rajkumar College, Raipur and graduated from University of Delhi with honours in political science. He then pursued his Bachelor of Laws degree from Madhusudan Law College in Cuttack. He was selected by the Rotary Foundation in Group Study Exchange Programme in 1976 and went to New Jersey, United States for study of the institutions of America and its people.

== Career ==
=== Legal practice ===
He enrolled with the Bar Council of Orissa in 1974. As an advocate, he practiced in the High Court of Orissa, and subordinate courts & tribunals in the state. He also appeared in several matters before the Supreme Court of India. He has specialized in commercial law and constitutional law. From 1989 to 1990, he was the standing counsel for Orissa State Road Transportation Corporation and also the senior standing counsel for Commercial Tax Department of the Government of Orissa between 1990 and 1994.

=== Judgeship ===
Patnaik was elevated as an additional judge of the Orissa High Court on 13 January 1994. Subsequently, on 7 February 1994, he was transferred to the Gauhati High Court as an additional judge. He was made a permanent judge (puisne judge) of the Gauhati High Court in 1995. In 2002 he was transferred to the High Court of Orissa, where he subsequently became the senior most puisne judge of Orissa High Court. In that capacity he served as the executive chairman of the Orissa State Legal Services Authority, which provides legal aid to petitioners in the State of Orissa.

He became Chief Justice of the Chhattisgarh High Court on 14 March 2005. He was praised by the then Chief Justice of India Ramesh Chandra Lahoti for his role in the running of Chhattisgarh High Court. Later that year he became Chief Justice of the Madhya Pradesh High Court, serving there for four years. During his tenure as the chief justice of both these states he was known for his bold judgements and was seen to be a judge who was pro poor and strongly supported the underprivileged classes.

On 17 November 2009, he was appointed a judge of the Supreme Court of India which he served until his retirement on 2 June 2014. After retirement he was offered the post of chairman of Odisha State Human Rights Commission which he declined as he wanted to stay in Delhi.

He was nominated by the then Chief Justice of India (CJI) as the Chairman of the Supreme Court Legal Services Committee. He was also nominated by the CJI who is the ex-officio President of Indian Law Institute, as the Chairman of the Committee on “Constitutional Law and Allied Subjects” for the project of the Indian Law Institute on Restatement of Indian Law.

== Notable work ==
Patnaik was a member of the "In-House Committee" to probe into the allegations made against Justice Soumitra Sen. The committee concluded that Soumitra Sen was guilty of misconduct and that misconduct disclosed was so serious that it called for initiation of proceedings for his removal. Rajya Sabha accepted the motion of impeachment against him. He resigned ahead of a similar impeachment motion against him in the Lok Sabha.

Patnaik was a part of the bench which on 27 February 2012 ordered the Government of India to implement the ambitious interlinking of rivers project in a time-bound manner and appointed a high-powered committee for its planning and implementation.

On 16 March 2012, Patnaik became a part of a special two-judge bench (constituted by Chief Justice of India S H Kapadia) for hearing all cases arising out of 2G spectrum case.

On 26 October 2018, the Supreme Court of India ordered a Central Vigilance Commissioner inquiry under Patnaik's supervision against CBI Director Alok Verma.

In Lily Thomas v. Union of India a two-judge bench of Justices Patnaik and S. J. Mukhopadhaya on 10 July 2013 ruled that any Member of Parliament (MP), Member of the Legislative Assembly (MLA) or Member of a Legislative Council (MLC) who is convicted of a crime and given a minimum of two years' imprisonment, loses membership of the House with immediate effect. This was in contrast to the earlier position, where convicted members held on to their seats until they exhausted all judicial remedy in lower court, High Court and the Supreme Court of India. Further, Section 8(4) of the Representation of the People Act, which allowed elected representatives three months to appeal their conviction, was declared unconstitutional.

== Honours ==
In March 2012, Patnaik was conferred with the degree of Doctor of Law (Honoris Causa) by the Utkal University.
