= Mallik (surname) =

Origin
- Origin: Bengali Hindu
- Region of origin: Bengal

Mallik (Bengali: মল্লিক) also known as Mallick or Mullick is a Bengali surname. The surname is found among many Bengali Hindu castes like Bengali Kayastha, Namasudra, Bagdi, Tili, Suvarna Baniks, Baidyas, Dom, and others as well as the Bengali Muslim community of India and Bangladesh.

== Notable people with the surname ==
- Abdul Hafiz Mallik, Bangladeshi major general and politician
- Abdul Majid Mallick, Bangladeshi politician
- Abhilash Mallick (born 1991), Indian cricketer
- Amaal Mallik, Indian music composer and playback singer
- Anne-Marie Mallik (born 1952), English actress
- Atikur Rahman Mallik (died 2017), Bangladeshi film editor
- Azharuddin Mallick (born 1997), Indian-Bengali football player
- Azizur Rahman Mallik (1918–1997), Bangladeshi historian and educationist
- Bani K Mallick, Indian statistician
- Basanta Kumar Mallik (1879–1958), Indian Bengali philosopher
- Donald L. Mallick (born 1930), American pilot
- Fakhrul Islam Mallick, Bangladeshi police officer and rector of Police Staff College
- Heather Mallick (born 1959), Canadian columnist, author and lecturer
- Indumadhab Mallick (1869–1917), Indian polymath
- Jyotipriya Mallick, Indian politician
- Koel Mullick (born 1982), Indian film actress
- Kumarendra Mallick (born 1942), Indian geophysicist and poet
- Matiur Rahman Mallik (1953–1969), Bengali child activist
- Mohammed Adam Mallik (died 2013), Indian politician
- Muhammad Naqi Mallick (born 1928), Pakistani cyclist
- Motiur Rahman Mollik (1950–2010), Bangladeshi poet lyricist, compositor, writer, researcher and editor
- Nagma Mohamed Mallick, Keralite diplomat
- Netar Mallick (born 1935), English nephrologist
- Nodu Mallik, Indian sitar maker
- Pravesh Mallick (born 1980), Indian composer, songwriter and playback singer
- Ram Chatur Mallick (1902–1990), Indian classical musician
- Ranjit Mallick (born 1944), Indian film actor and blogger
- Ranjit Mallik (born 1944), Bengali film actor
- Rasik Krishna Mallick (1810–1858), Indian journalist, editor and educationist
- Roop Mallik, Indian biophysicist
- Sadya Afreen Mallick, Bangladeshi singer and journalist
- Samad Ali Mallick (born 1994), Indian-Bengali football player
- Shirala Mallick, Pakistani politician
- Subodh Chandra Mallik (1879–1920), Bengali industrialist and philanthropist
- Surabuddin Mallick (born 1992), Indian-Bengali football player
- Zia Mallick (born 1977), British born investor and businessman

== See also ==
- Bengali Kazi
- Mullick
