= Samantray =

Samantaray (Odia: ସାମନ୍ତରାୟ/ସାନ୍ତରା) is a title used by people belonging to the Karan caste and Khandayat caste in Odisha. It is also used by Utkala Brahmins.

== Notable people ==
- Biplab Samantray (born 1988), Indian cricketer.
- Elina Samantray, Indian actress.
- Debasish Samantray (born 1996), Indian cricketer
- Yudhistir Samantray (1953–2023), Indian politician.
