= Jagabandhu Patnaik =

19th-century statesman, freedom fighter from Odisha, and Dewan of Porahat

Jagabandhu Patnaik (Jagu Dewan)
- Born: Kera, Singhbhum, Porahat Estate (now in West Singhbhum, Jharkhand)
- Died: October 1857 Chakradharpur, Singhbhum
- Cause of death: Executed (Hanged by British East India Company forces)
- Allegiance: Porahat Kingdom (under Raja Achyut Singh and Raja Arjun Singh)
- Branch: Porahat Military Forces
- Rank: Dewan (Prime Minister and Military Advisor)
- Commands: Co-commander of the insurgent forces with Raghdeo
- Known for: Instigating the 1831 Kol Rebellion; First martyr from Odisha in the 1857 War of Independence
- Conflicts: Kol Rebellion (1831); Indian Rebellion of 1857; Battle of Chakradharpur (1857)
- Memorials: Statue at Kera Maa Mandir Sahi, West Singhbhum
- Children: Balmukunda Patnaik

Jagabandhu Patnaik (or Jagu Dewan) was the Dewan of Porahat in Singhbhum, village Kera (now in Jharkhand). He served as the Dewan under Raja Achyut Singh and his successor Raja Arjun Singh. Jagu Dewan took part in anti-British activities during the 1857 Indian rebellion of Independence.

== Background ==
The Kol rebellion of Singhbhum in 1831 was the outcome of the inspiration and instigation of Jagabandhu Patnaik more popularly known as Jagu Dewan to the Kols. Jagu Dewan was considered a dangerous enemy by the British government, a ransom was also put up by the British government for his capture as reported in then British administrative documents and records like Halliday’s Minute of 30 September 1858 by Sir Frederick James Halliday (first Lieutenant-Governor of Bengal).

== Chakradharpur Uprising ==
In the 1857 war he encouraged Raja Arjun Singh to raise his arms against the British. Jagu Dewan with a strong Kol force and an army of 300 Odia soldiers rose against the British and banished the British soldiers of the region thus Jagu successfully occupied Chakradharpur from the British, he also abolished all the British Chaukis (Outposts) located in Chakradharpur.

== Final stand and Martyrdom ==
In the aftermath of occupying Chakradharpur, Jagu Dewan now prepared for the final stand against the incoming British forces under the command of Lt. Birch, he became the commander of the Chakradharpur Fort and was assisted by Raja Arjun Singh's brother Raghdeo in his resistance against the British. Jagu Dewan fought valiantly against the British army however in the month of November 1857, the British force under Lt. Birch reoccupied Chakradharpur and defeated the forces assembled under Jagu Dewan, Jagu Dewan was captured and executed by the British Authorities.

== Legacy ==
Dewan Jagabandhu Patnaik's son Balmukunda Patnaik had also conspired against the British by helping Veer Surendra Sai and his rebels in their freedom struggle against the British. Balmukunda Patnaik was later hanged by the British authority for treason. Dewan Jagabandhu Patnaik is also regarded as the first martyr from Odisha in the Indian Rebellion of 1857.

== See also ==
Raja Arjun Singh
