= Gopinath Mohanty =

Indian (Odia) writer (1914–1991)

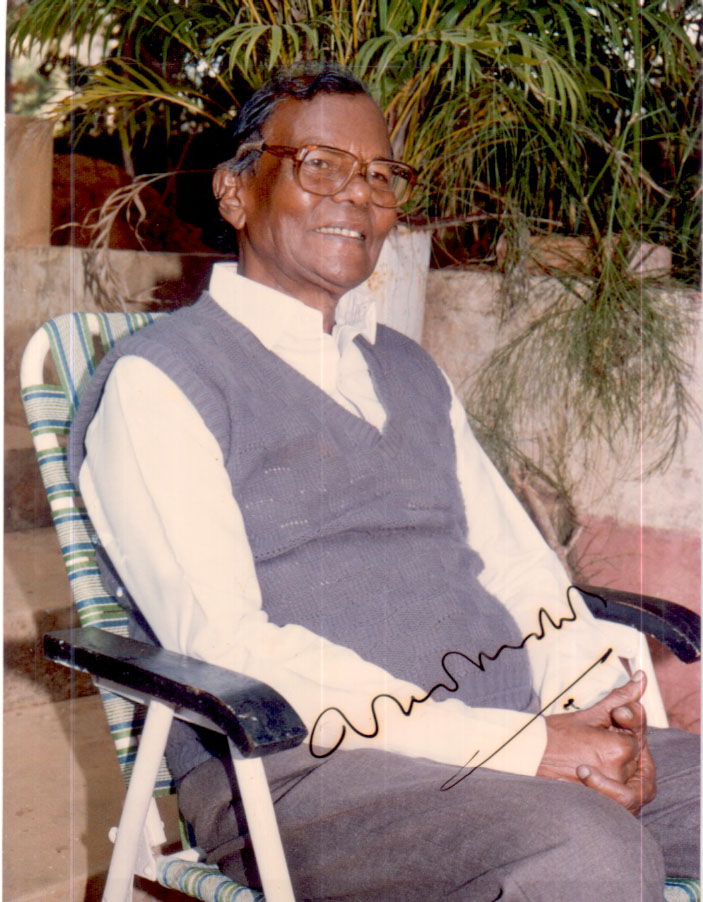
- Gopinath Mohanty at Home in Bhubaneswar in 80s
- Born: 20 April 1914; Nagabali, Cuttack
- Died: 20 August 1991 (aged 77); San Jose, California
- Education: M.A.
- Alma mater: Ravenshaw College; Patna University
- Occupations: Administrator; UGC distinguished visiting professor, Utkal University
- Awards: Jnanpith Award; Padma Bhushan

Gopinath Mohanty (1914–1991), winner of the Jnanpith award, and the first winner of the National Sahitya Akademi Award of odia language in 1955 – for his novel, Amrutara Santana – was a prolific Odia writer of the mid-twentieth century. Satya Prakash Mohanty, professor of English, Cornell University says: "In my opinion, Gopinath Mohanty is the most important Indian novelist in the second half of the twentieth century."

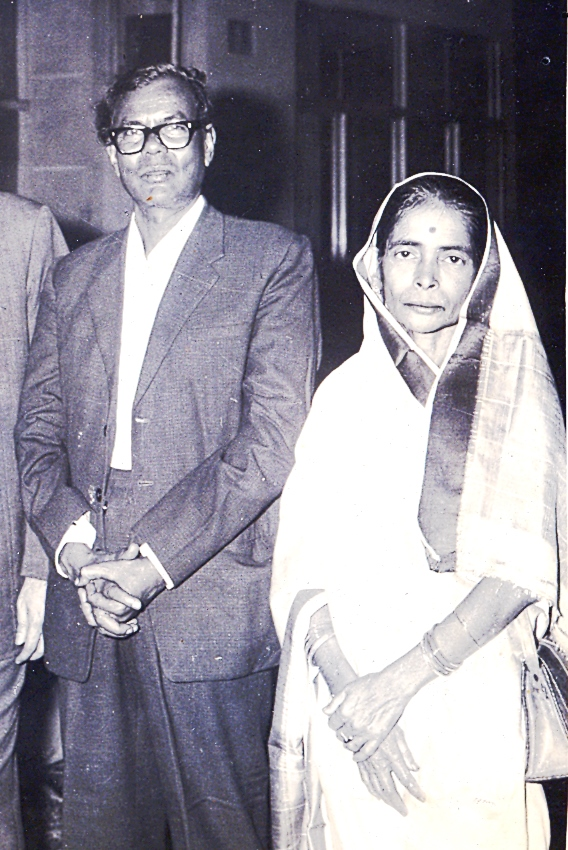
Gopinath Mohanty with wife Adaramani in 1960s

== Career ==
Mohanty joined the Odisha Administrative Service in 1938 and retired in 1969. He was invited by Professor Prabhat Nalini Das, then head of the English department at Utkal University as University Grants Commission, UGC Distinguished Visiting Professor and writer-in-residence for two years at the English department, Utkal University, in the late 1970s.

In 1986, he joined San Jose State University in the United States as an adjunct professor of Social Sciences. He died at San Jose, California on 20 August 1991.

== Novels ==
Gopinath's first novel, Mana Gahirara Chasa, was published in 1940, which was followed by Dadi Budha (1944), Paraja (1945) and Amrutara Santana (1947). His literary output was prolific. He wrote twenty-four novels, ten collections of short stories, three plays, two biographies, two volumes of critical essays, and five books on the languages of the Kandha, Gadaba and Saora tribes of Odisha. He translated Tolstoy's War and Peace (Yuddh O Shanti), in three volumes, 1985–86), and Rabindranath Tagore's Jogajog, (1965), into Odia.

Dadi Budha (The Ancestor) (1944) is his first novel on the tribal community and it offers a realistic portrait of life and tradition of the tribal people of the mountainous region surrounded by thick forest. It is a seminal novel in Tribal Literature and corresponds to Chinua Achebe's classic tale of Colonial invasion of tribal culture Things fall Apart and foregrounds almost the same theme – the impact of modernity and disintegration of tribal society.

Paraja (1945) is a moving narrative based on the life of a tribal community. It is the tale of one's attachment to land, the soil of one's ancestors. Sitakant Mahapatra describes the novel as "the story of shattered dreams". The novel also implicitly portrays the impact of colonial rule on Odia tribals.

Amrutara Santana (1949), the first novel to receive the Central Sahitya Akademi Award (1955), is centered round the life of the Kandhas, another tribe in the southern parts of Odisha.

== Short stories ==
In the post-Independence era Odia fiction assumed a new direction. The trend which Fakir Mohan Senapati had started developed after the 1950s. Gopinath Mohanty, Surendra Mohanty and Manoj Das are considered the three literary jewels of this period. They were pioneers of a new trend, namely, that of developing or projecting the "individual as protagonist" in Odia fiction. Another of Gopinath's stories, 'Pimpudi' has had great influence. It is the story of a forest officer checking rice smuggling to Madras.

== English translations ==
Six of Mohanty's novels, along with a number of short stories, have been translated into English. It is extremely difficult to render in English the nuances of Gopinath Mohanty's language. However, translators have attempted to convey the richness and complexity of the original texts to readers unfamiliar with Odia.

English Translations of Gopinath Novels
Title	English title	Translator(s)	Publisher(s)	Publication Date
Danapani	The Survivor	Bikram K. Das	Macmillan India Limited	1985
Paraja	n/a	Bikram K. Das	Faber and Faber (UK) and Oxford University Press (India)	1987
Dadi Budha	The Ancestor	Aruṇa Kumāra Mahānti	Sahitya Akademi	1997
Laya Bilaya	High Tide, Ebb Tide	Bikram K. Das	Lark Books	1999
Amrutara Santana	The Dynasty of the Immortals	Bidhu Bhusan Das, Prabhat Nalini Das, and Oopali Operajita	Sahitya Akademi	2016

== Awards ==
Mohanty received the Visuva Milan citation in 1950. He won the first central Sahitya Akademi Award in 1955 for his novel, Amrutara Santana.. It was the first Sahitya Akademi Award ever given to a creative literary work in any language or any genre. The Jnanpith Award was conferred on him in 1973 for his epic Mati Matala (The Fertile Soil). He was awarded the Soviet Land Nehru Award in 1970, for his Odia Translation of Gorky's work, a D.Litt. by Sambalpur University in 1976 and a distinguished visiting professorship for creative writing by the U.G.C. at the Department of English, Utkal University in 1976. In 1981, the government of India conferred the Padma Bhushan on him in recognition of his distinguished contribution to literature. He was an Emeritus Fellow of the Government of India for creative writing.

== Bibliography ==
- Mohanty, Gopinath (1963). Ranadhandola; galpa sangraha (in Odia). Bikasa pratishthana. OCLC 46465771.
- Mohanty, Gopinath (1963). Tantrikara : upanyasa (in Odia). Bikasa Pratishthana. OCLC 31273912.
- Mohanty, Gopinath (1964). Matimatala (in Odia). Aloka Sahitya Pratishthana. OCLC 19361991.
- Mohanty, Gopinath (1965). Amrutara santana (in Odia). Jagannatha Ratha. OCLC 19363005.
- Mohanty, Gopinath (1967). Harijana (in Odia). Jagannatha ratha. OCLC 30996252.
- Mohanty, Gopinath (1967). Gupta Ganga (in Odia). Jagannath Ratha. OCLC 30990581.
- Mohanty, Gopinath (1968). Nam mane nahim (in Odia). OCLC 30883679.
- Mohanty, Gopinath (1971). Danapani (in Odia). Kataka shtudents shtora. OCLC 46465738.
- Mohanty, Gopinath (1971). Managahirara casha (in Odia). Shtudentas Shtora. OCLC 18470514.
- Mohanty, Gopinath (1971). Udanta khai (in Odia). Kataka shtudents shtora. OCLC 46465824.
- Mohanty, Gopi Nath (1973). Kala-sakti (in Odia). Agraduta. OCLC 19361604.
- Mohanty, Gopinath (1979). Digadihudi : upanyasa (in Odia). Bidyapuri. OCLC 8051826.
- Mohanty, Gopinath (1979). Manara niam (in Odia). Mayura Pablikesansa. OCLC 8669195.
- Mohanty, Gopinath (1980). Analanala (in Odia). Odisa Lekhaka Samabaya Samiti. OCLC 17879923.
- Mohanty, Gopinatha (1983). Paraja (in Odia). Bidyapuri. OCLC 499123865.
- Mohanty, Gopinatha (1985). Laya bilaya (in Odia). Bidyapuri. OCLC 499128654.
- Mohanty, Gopinath (1985). Dhulimatira santha (in Odia). Bidyapuri. OCLC 16804828.
- Mohanty, Gopinath (1988). Bundae pani (in Odia). Bidyapuri. OCLC 21598837.
- Mohanty, Gopinath (1989). Sata pañca (in Odia). Odisa Buk Shtora. OCLC 22006434.
- Mohanty, Gopinath (1989). Kichi kahibaku chahem : upanyasa (in Odia). Phrendas Pablisarsa. OCLC 22006052.
- Mohanty, Gopinath (1991). Yuddha (in Odia). Phrendas Pablisarsa. OCLC 28723943.
- Mohanty, Gopinath (1991). Mahapurusha (in Odia). Phrendas Pablisarsa. OCLC 27938222.
- Mohanty, Gopinath (1992). Srotasvati : atmajibani (in Odia). Bidyapuri. OCLC 30512277.
- Mohanty, Gopinath (1992). Sarasayya (in Odia). Phrendas Pablisarsa. OCLC 28293188.
- Mohanty, Gopinath (1993). Tinikala (in Odia). Phrends Pablisarsa. OCLC 30513367.
- Mohanty, Gopinath (1993). Anama : upanyasa (in Odia). Phrends Pablisarsa. OCLC 30512765.
- Mohanty, Gopinath (1995). Baghei (in Odia). Phrends Pablisarsa. OCLC 33970292.
- Mohanty, Gopinath (2012). Dipam jyoti : pujya Gopabandhu Caudhurinka jibani (in Odia). Vidyapuri. ISBN 978-81-7411-853-0. OCLC 805702022.

== See also ==
- List of Indian writers
- List of Sahitya Akademi Award winners for Odia
- Kanhu Charan Mohanty
