= Biswajit Das =

Biswajit Das may refer to:

- Murder of Biswajit Das, a Bangladeshi tailor, in 2012
- Biswajit Das (playwright) (1936–2004), Indian playwright
- Biswajit Das (politician) (born (1967), Indian politician
