= Lakshmi Raghupati =

Indian public servant (born 1947)

Lakshmi Raghupaty (born 23 September 1947 at Trivandrum, India) is an Indian public servant. She served as Director of the Ministry of Environment and Forests. She worked at the ministry from 1987 to 2007 and provided scientific and technical inputs in policy and strategy formulation.

== Education ==
She earned a double masters in sciences and technology from Birla Institute of Technology and Science, Pilani, in 1971 and 1976, respectively. She completed her PhD there in 1985.

== Career ==
She worked in environmental impact assessment, which included environmental clearances (EC) for industrial projects and specifying ecologically sensitive areas (ESA). She is an environmentalist, and works as a visiting faculty member in the TERI School of Advanced Studies. She represented the Government of India in the negotiations of UNEP Basel Convention on the Control of Transboundary Movement of Hazardous Wastes and their Disposal.

She was elected Chair and Vice-Chair of TWG during 1993-97 and invited as a Technical Expert in the technical and special meetings of the Basel Convention. She handled World Bank Funded Capacity Building for Industrial Pollution Management Project (CBIPMP) on Development and Implementation of National Remediation/Rehabilitation Plan for Polluted Sites, during 2005–2007.

She coordinated projects aided by International agencies such as the World Bank, Danish International Development Assistance (DANIDA) and as a focal point and National Project Director for United Nations Development Programme (UNDP) on Medical Plant Conservation.

She handled the UNEP Basel Convention and was responsible to coordinate with the Secretariat of the Basel Convention (SBC). She represented the Ministry in the Technical Working Group (TWG) and was the Chair and Vice-Chair of TWG and participated as a Technical Expert in Basel Convention Meetings including the Meeting of the Conference of the Parties (COPs). She was a part of the Basel Convention as a member of the Mobile Phone Partnership Programme (MP3) and participated in meetings of the Basel Convention from 1997 to 2007.

She was a part of India's Waste Management Policy and System presented in 3R Conferences and meetings Japan (2004-2007). She facilitated a study on e-waste management in India for the Basel Convention and funded by the Government of Japan in 2004 to 2005. She prepared a road map for E-waste management in India via the India-EU Waste Forum and India-EU waste programme from 2006 to 2007.

She began working as a Consultant in national and international organizations such as Confederation for Indian Industries (CII-ITC Centre for Sustainable Development), in 2011. She worked on the Indo-German Environment Programme (IGEP) - Deutsche Gesellschaft für Internationale Zusammenarbeit (GIZ) GmbH, New Delhi from 2007 to 2015, Municipal Solid Waste Management from 2013–14, Associated Chamber of Commerce & Industry (ASSOCHEM) on Hazardous Chemicals & Waste Management from 2007 to 2009, Hazardous Wastes, Confederation for Indian Industries, New Delhi from 2007 to 2008.

She worked as a Technical Specialist in E-waste WEEE Recycle Project on e-waste management, the European Union-funded project ‘SWITCH ASIA’ on E-waste Management from 2010 to 2013. She was designated as a Senior Project Manager, Indo-European E-waste Initiative for waste from 2009 to 2010. She was an Adviser to the E-waste Management Manufacturers’ Association for Information Technology (MAIT), Indo-European E-waste Initiative (IEe-waste) Project, New Delhi (2008–10).
