= Eumeta crameri =

Scientific classification
- Kingdom: Animalia
- Phylum: Arthropoda
- Clade: Pancrustacea
- Class: Insecta
- Order: Lepidoptera
- Family: Psychidae
- Genus: Eumeta
- Species: E. crameri

Binomial name
- Eumeta crameri (Westwood), 1854

Species of moth

Eumeta crameri is a bagworm moth of the family Psychidae. It was described by John O. Westwood in 1854 and has worldwide distribution in tropical and subtropical habitats, including India, Bangladesh, Sri Lanka, New Zealand and Puerto Rico.

== Description ==
In the male, the head, thorax and abdomen are clothed with light and dark brown hair. Forewings are reddish brown with the veins streaked with black. The interspaces with pale streaks, more or less fuscous suffusion on outer area. Hindwings are smoky brown. Wings rather short and broad.

== Ecology ==
The characteristic of the species is that it spins its cocoon all its larval life, decorating it with small twigs, bark and thorns from the trees on which it feeds. (For this reason, it is sometimes known as the large faggot worm). After hatching, the larva climbs to the top of its host tree and begins feeding on the tender shoots.

The Eumeta crameri larva renovates its case three times during the two- to three-month larval stage, doing it progressively faster each time. Case renovation consists of replacing the twigs and thorns that make up the case with longer materials, with one piece noticeably longer than the others. The larva approaches 3 cm in length when entering the pupa stage. Adult male moths are reddish brown with wings.

Females lay about 500 eggs that incubate for 10 to 15 days.

As the larvae grow, they prefer older leaves and bark of a variety of hosts: acacia (wattle), tea, mimosa, Australian pine, eucalyptus, gmelina, lychee, thuja, Rangoon creeper, strawberry guava and many other species.

Some ghost species of commercial significance, such as acacia and tea, are particularly susceptible to Eumeta crameri. As a result, this species is frequently dealt with as a pest. Some plantations are treated with aerial insecticides to protect the host plants. Plantation environments are more susceptible to the larvae than natural habitats.

== Sources ==
- Upsasi Tea Research Foundation Retrieved on 23 October 2005.
- Agrawal, Arvind; Pati, Atanu Kumar (2003-12-25). "Larval case renovation – a unique behaviour in bagworm moth, Eumeta crameri Westwood" (PDF). Current Science. 85 (12): 1674–1679.
- Agrawal, Arvind; Pati, Atanu Kumar (2000). "Hierarchical perception of stimuli during case construction in the bagworm moth Eumeta crameri (Lepidoptera: Psychidae)". Journal of Insect Behavior. 13 (5): 667–677. doi:10.1023/A:1007839926460. ;
- Ameen, Mahmud-Ul; Sultana, Parvin (1977). "Biology of the bag-worm moth Eumeta crameri Westwood (Lepidoptera: Psychidae) from Dacca, Bangladesh". Journal of Natural History. 11 (1): 17–24. doi:10.1080/00222937700770021.
