= Manoranjan Das =

Indian (Odia) Writer

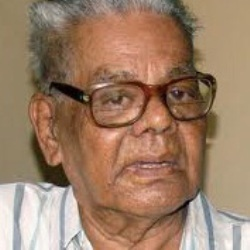
- Born: Babu; 23 July 1923; Cuttack district, 42 mauza, patana, Odisha, India
- Died: 17 February 2013 (aged 89); Cuttack district, Odisha, India
- Occupation: playwright
- Spouse: Kusum Kumari Das
- Children: Punyasloka, Sabita, Sujata, Sikata
- Writing career
- Notable awards: Padma Shri, Sahitya Academy
- Movements: modernism, experimentalism

Manoranjan Das (23 July 1923 – 17 February 2013) was an influential Indian dramatist, and pioneer of modernism in Odia Literature. He was known for his experimentalism and deep socio-political awareness, who became most known in the 1960s with his experimental theatre.

Amongst his most known work are, Kathagodha (The Wooden Horse) and Aranya Fasal (The Wild Harvest), which won him the Sahitya Akademi Award (1971). In a career spanning over four decades, his plays include Janmamati (Land of Birth) written in 1943 and his latest Nandika Kesari which appeared in 1985.

== Early life and education ==
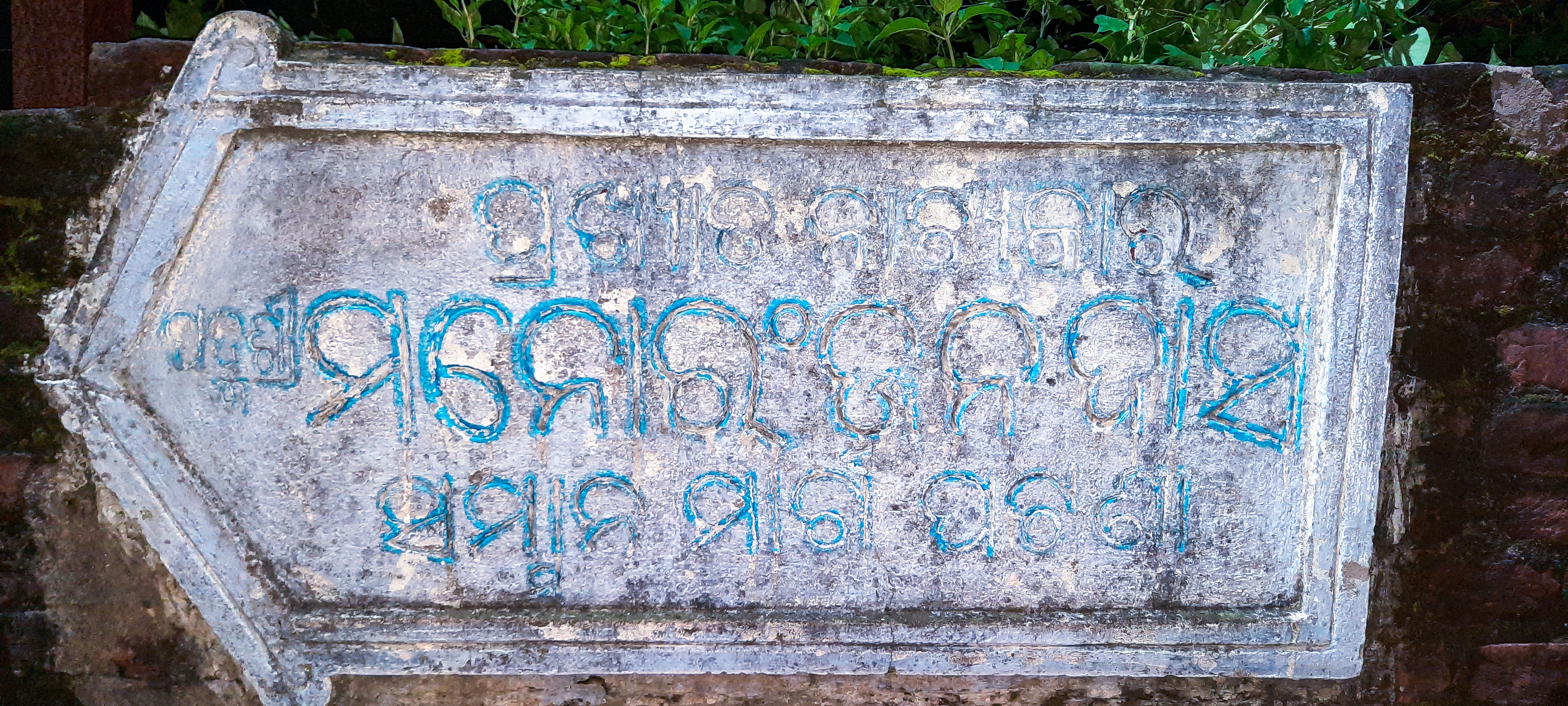
A street in 42 muza, patana, dedicated to Sri Manoranjan Das.

Born in 1923 in a village (named "Patana,42-Mouza, Cuttack sadar") near Cuttack, he did his schooling in Kujang near Paradip, completing his intermediate in 1942. Thereafter he joined Ravenshaw College in Cuttack.

== Career ==
He joined All India Radio where he rose to the level of Producer Emeritus. During his literary career, he has written 14 other plays, including Aranya Fasal (The Wild Harvest), which won him the Sahitya Akademi Award given Sahitya Akademi, India's National Academy of Letters in 1971, and the Padma Shri by Government of India in 2004.

His other plays are Jauban (Youth), August Na (The Ninth August 1947), Baxi Jagabandhu (The Sacrifice of Jagabandhu), Agami (The Oncoming), Abarodha (The Seize), Kathagodha (The Wooden Horse), and Sabdalipi (The Word-script).

== Works ==
- Smriti samlap (autobiography). Friends Publishers, 1999; ISBN 81-7401-274-5.
- Ten essays on poet, poetry and psychology. Future Publications, 2005.
- Aranya Fasal. Sahitya Akademi Publications, 2001; ISBN 81-260-1213-7.

== Works in translation ==
- The Wooden Horse: drama. Pub. Bookland International (1982)
- The Wild Harvest. Translated by Prabhat Nalini Das. Pub. Sahitya Akademi, 1993; ISBN 81-72014-36-8
- A game of words: a play. tr. by Bibhu Padhi, Guru Charan Behera. Pub. Prachi Prakashan, 1997; ISBN 81-85824-05-3
- A ray's rope. Pub. Ila Das, 1997.
- Arun Kymar Mohanty (1998). The ninth of August: a play. J. K. Nayak (tr.). Sahitya Akademi. ISBN 81-260-0484-3.
- Nandika Keshari: (Sarala award winning play). tr by Prabhat Nalini Das. Prachi Prakashan (2000); ISBN 81-85824-12-6
- Afternoon flurries. Pub. Subarnarekha, 2002. ISBN 81-87467-14-2
- A dialogue with memory (autobiography). tr. by Aruna Kumar Mohanty & J. K. Nayak. National Book Trust, India, (2002); ISBN 81-23739-38-9
