= Gopal Krishna Sarangi =

Indian economist

Academic background
- Education: Teri University, Ravenshaw University

Academic work
- Discipline: Energy economics
- Institutions: Teri University; New Delhi, India

Gopal Krishna Sarangi is an Indian economist specializing in energy economics, climate change, energy regulations, energy access, etc. He is the former Head of the Department (HOD), Department of Policy and Management Studies (DoPMS), Teri University.

== Education ==
His doctoral thesis at Teri University was entitled, "Electricity sector regulation and sustainable development outcomes: An analysis of regulatory impact in 12 Indian states for 2001–2010." under the supervision of Professor Arabinda Mishra. He had earlier pursued his Master's in Economics from Ravenshaw University, Odisha.

== Selected bibliography ==
=== Selected scholarly articles ===
- Mishra, Arabinda; Sarangi, Gopal; Wadehra, Shivani (May 2016). "Off-grid Energy Development in India : An Approach towards Sustainability". Economic and Political Weekly. 51 (22): 105–114.
- Sarangi, Gopal; Kumar, Surendra (June 2012). "Measuring the performance of water service providers in urban India: implications for managing water utilities". Water Policy. 14 (3): 391–408. doi:10.2166/wp.2011.109.
- Sarangi, Gopal (2011). "State of Competition in Indian Power Sector : An Exploratory Analysis". International Journal of Regulation and Governance. 11 (2): 21–39. doi:10.3233/IJR-120101.
- Sarangi, Gopal; Arabinda, Mishra; Jörgensen, Kirsten (November 2015). "Multi-level climate governance in India: the role of the states in climate action planning and renewable energies". Journal of Integrative Environmental Sciences. 12 (4): 267–283. doi:10.1080/1943815X.2015.1093507. S2CID 155619766.
- Sarangi, Gopal; Arabinda, Mishra (December 2013). "Competitive Mechanisms in Indian Power Sector Some Reflections on Trends and Patterns". Journal of Infrastructure Development. 5 (2): 103–120. doi:10.1177/0974930614521273. S2CID 156707416.
- Sarangi, Gopal; Mishra, Arabinda; Varma, Navarun (2009). "The impact of climate change on a Hydro-Geographic "Region of Conflict": Case study of the Ganga basin" (PDF). World Affairs. 13 (2): 40–64.

=== Book chapters ===
- Sarangi, Gopal (2014), "Analytical frameworks and an integrated approach for mini-grid based electrification", in Bhattacharyya, Subhes; Palit, Debajit (eds.), Mini-Grids for Rural Electrification of Developing Countries, London: Springer, ISBN 978-3-319-04816-1.
- Sarangi, Gopal (2014), "Energizing rural India using distributed generation: The case of solar mini-grids in Chhattisgarh State, India", in Bhattacharyya, Subhes; Palit, Debajit (eds.), Mini-Grids for Rural Electrification of Developing Countries, London: Springer, ISBN 978-3-319-04816-1.
- Sarangi, Gopal (2014), "Poverty amidst plenty: renewable energy based mini-grid electrification in Nepal", in Bhattacharyya, Subhes; Palit, Debajit (eds.), Mini-Grids for Rural Electrification of Developing Countries, London: Springer, ISBN 978-3-319-04816-1.
- Sarangi, Gopal; Mishra, A (2007), "Economic Reforms and Public Expenditure on Social Services.", in Nayak, NC; Goswami, K; Chatterjee, B (eds.), Economic Reforms, Human Welfare and Sustainable Development in India, New Delhi: New Century Publications, ISBN 978-8177081466.
- Sarangi, Gopal; Goswami, A; Srivastava, Leena (2008), "Possible Empirical Ways of Analyzing Impact of Regulation Sectors in India", in Sarkar, NC; Aggarwal, V; Chawla, R; Malik, S (eds.), Regulatory Performances in India : Achievements, Constraints and Future Action, New Delhi: TERI Publication, ISBN 978-8179931295.

=== Publications in magazines and monographs ===
- Sarangi, Gopal (2008). "Regulating Merchant Power Plants in India". Regulateri.
- Sarangi, Gopal (2012). "Contours of Public Private Partnership Maegime in Decentralized Renewable Energy Systems in India. Mainstreaming Public Partnership in India" (PDF). CUTs Institute of Regulation and Competition.
- Sarangi, Gopal; Palit, Debajit (2014). "Renewable energy-based rural electrification : The mini-grid experience from India". Global Network on Energy for Sustainable Development.

== See also ==
- List of economists
- Teri University
