= Oopali Operajita =

Classical Indian dancer and public policy advisor

Oopalee Operajita
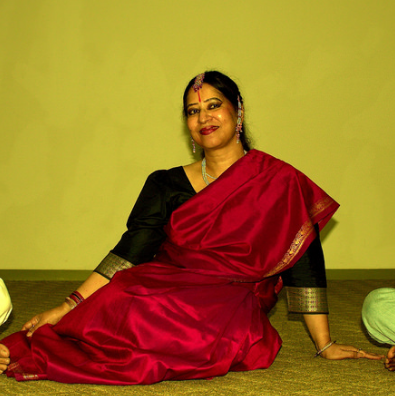
- Education: Carnegie Mellon University (MA); Dalhousie University; Delhi University; Rishi Valley School
- Occupations: Classical Odissi and Bharatanatyam dancer and choreographer
- Parent(s): Bidhu Bhusan Das; Prabhat Nalini Das
- Relatives: Sarala Devi (paternal great aunt); Nityanand Kanungo (great uncle)
- Website: oopalioperajita.com

Oopalee Operajita (also spelled Oopali Operajita) is a classical Odissi and Bharatanatyam dancer and choreographer. As well as the chair and founder of the Al Gore Sustainable Technology Venture Competition. The competition is named for former U.S. vice president Al Gore but operates without his involvement.

== Education and career ==
Operajita went to Rishi Valley School at age six, and studied there for nine years, graduating with the GCE 'O' levels (Indian School Certificate). At Rishi Valley School, she studied Bharatanatyam of the Pandanallur style.

Operajita founded a sustainable technology venture competition in 2007, which she named in honor of former US Vice President Al Gore. The Al Gore Sustainable Technology Venture Competition (AGSTVC) is open to MBA, Science and Technology graduate and final year undergraduates, and was held annually from 2009-2011. It has attracted entries from institutions across India, Bangladesh, and the USA, including Indian Institutes of Technology (IITs), National Institutes of Technology (NITs) and Indian Institutes of Management (IIMs). The first competition, 2009, was held at IIT Kharagpur, which was the official partner. In 2010 and 2011 the competition was at IIT Madras, which was one of its education partners, together with IIM Calcutta. A team from Bangladesh, and another from the Tata Institute of Social Sciences (TISS) took first and second prizes in 2011.

Together with her parents, Operajita translated Gopinath Mohanty's Amrutara Santāna into English. The translation, published in 2015, is called, Amrutara Santāna: The Dynasty of The Immortals.

== Dance ==
Having trained under Kelucharan Mohapatra and Deba Prasad Das, Operajita has performed worldwide. The New York Times has called her one of Mohapatra's "star pupils."

She is the first classical Indian artist to have performed at the Carnegie Music Hall in Pittsburgh. She served as the artistic director and choreographer for a concert India's president hosted for US president Barack Obama in 2010. Her dance performance with Kelucharan Mohapatra was ranked as one of the top 10 Pittsburgh classical dance performances of 1996 by the Pittsburgh Post-Gazette.

As a classical dancer, she was cast in the dance dramas in Sanskrit, Telugu and Tamil, staged each year under the school's banyan tree for its founder, Jiddu Krishnamurti. The music for these productions was composed by Veena G Visalakshi, a disciple of Vizianagaram Venkataramana Das, and the text was chosen or composed by Pandit Chundi Hanumantharao. Operajita studied the veena for seven years and Carnatic vocal music for nine years with Veena G Visalakshi.

== Bibliography ==
- Ronald Russel; Alex Medvedev (2017). Oopali Operajita. CreateSpace Independent Publishing Platform. ISBN 9781979092159.
