= Bhagirathi Mahapatra =

Indian politician

Bhagirathi Mohapatra

Member of Parliament, Rajya Sabha
- In office 3 April 1956 – 2 April 1962
- Constituency: Odisha

Member of the Central Legislative Assembly
- In office 1945–1947

Founder Secretary of the Utkal Pradesh Congress Committee
- In office 1921–1937

Personal details
- Born: 24 April 1892 Cuttack, Odisha, British India
- Party: Indian National Congress
- Spouse: Sarala Devi
- Children: Amitav Mohapatra
- Relatives: Nityanand Kanungo (brother-in-law)
- Education: M.A., B.L.
- Alma mater: Ravenshaw College, Cuttack
- Occupation: Lawyer, politician, freedom fighter
- Known for: Non-cooperation Movement, Trustee of Swaraj Ashram (1940), Director of Khadi Association

Bhagirathi Mohapatra was an Indian politician. He was a member of central legislative assembly from (1945–1947).He was a member of parliament, representing Odisha in the Rajya Sabha the upper house of India's Parliament as a member of the Indian National Congress.Sri Bhagirathi Mohapatra was also the founder secretary of Utkal Pradesh congress Committee (1921–1937) along with Utkalamani Pandit Gopabandhu Das, who was also the founder president. He was also one of the main trustee of Swaraj Ashram, Odisha (1940).

== Personal life and education ==
Mohapatra was born on 24 April 1892 into an aristocratic Karan family in Cuttack, Odisha (then part of the Bengal Presidency in British India). He completed his primary and secondary education locally before enrolling at Ravenshaw College in Cuttack, from where he graduated in 1914. He pursued higher studies to earn his Master of Arts (M.A.) degree in 1916, followed by a Bachelor of Laws (B.L.) degree in 1918. After completing his legal education, he established a successful law practice in Cuttack.

In 1917, Mohapatra married Sarala Devi, who became an iconic author, feminist, and the first female member elected to the Odisha Legislative Assembly. The couple had a son, Amitav Mohapatra. His brother-in-law, Nityanand Kanungo, was also a prominent political leader who served as a Union Minister in Jawaharlal Nehru's cabinet and as a state Governor.

== Political career and freedom struggle ==
In 1921, Mohapatra renounced his legal practice to join the Non-cooperation movement led by Mahatma Gandhi. He collaborated closely with Pandit Gopabandhu Das to organize the nationalist framework in Odisha. Together, they established the Utkal Pradesh Congress Committee (UPCC) in March 1921, with Mohapatra serving as its first Founder Secretary from 1921 to 1937. He was also inducted as a permanent member of the All India Congress Committee (AICC) in 1921.

Due to his active participation in anti-colonial agitations, Mohapatra was arrested by British authorities in 1922 and sentenced to more than two years of rigorous imprisonment. He later played a principal role in coordinating the Salt Satyagraha (1930) and the Quit India Movement (1942), which led to multiple prison terms at the Berhampur Circle Jail. In 1932, the colonial administration retaliated against his political mobilization by attaching and confiscating his personal properties.

Mohapatra served as the Chairman of the Cuttack Municipality from 1937 to 1941. He entered central legislative politics during the pre-independence era when he was elected as a member of the Central Legislative Assembly, serving from 1945 to 1947. Following India's independence, he was elected to the Rajya Sabha, representing Odisha from 3 April 1956 to 2 April 1962.

== Achievements and contributions ==
- Institutional Leadership: In 1940, Mohapatra took over as a principal trustee of the Swaraj Ashram in Cuttack, which functioned as the organizational hub for freedom activities in Odisha. He also established the Alka Ashram in Jagatsinghpur to promote rural empowerment and social welfare.
- Grassroots Economic Empowerment: As the Director of the Khadi Association, he vigorously campaigned for the boycott of foreign garments and set up handloom weaving centers to foster economic self-reliance at the grassroots level.
- Linguistic and Cultural Oversight: During his parliamentary tenure in the Rajya Sabha, he was selected as an active member of the specialized Parliamentary Board on Languages and Culture.
