= Pankaj Charan Das =

Father Of Odissi dance

Adi Guru Pankaj Charan Das
- ପଙ୍କଜ ଚରଣ ଦାସ
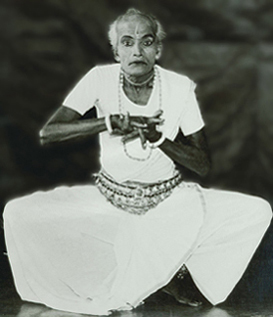
- Born: 17 March 1919; Puri, Odisha, India
- Died: 11 June 2003 (aged 84); Puri, Odisha, India
- Occupations: Indian classical dancer, choreographer
- Years active: 1933–2000
- Known for: Odissi
- Notable work: Panchakanyā Glānisanghāra Matrubandanā; Balagopalāshtaka
- Awards: Padmashree

Guru Pankaj Charan Das (1919–2003) was an Indian classical dancer, choreographer and the Ādi Guru of Odissi dance. He is known as the 'Father of Odissi dance'.

== Life ==
He was the adopted son of a mahari (temple dancer) Ratna Prabha Devi and from her he learnt the art of devotional movement. He was responsible to revive the dance form that later became the base for birth of Odissi. He was the man who was responsible for bringing odissi out of the temple precincts into broad daylight. He was also awardees of Padmashree in 1992. His dance was laden with bhakti rasa and each of its movements spelt the holy name of Lord Jagannath. He strictly followed the mahari style in his dance. He was especially adept in group choreographies and has left his indelible impression on masterpieces like Glānisanghāra, Matrubandanā, Balagopālashtaka and many more. His expertise dealt with both Odia and Sanskrit language. His choreographed dance episodes based on the lives of great poets of India Kalidas and Jayadeba. In mid-life he was made the head of department of Odissi dance, in Utkal Sangeet Mahavidyalaya, the only college of dance & music of Odisha. He taught Kelucharan Mohapatra, Deba Prasad Das, Mayadhar Raut, and Bhagaban Sahu.

== Awards ==
- President's Award by Sangeet Natak Academi
- Orissa Sahitya Academi Award
- State Sangeet Natak Academi
- Kabi Samrat Upendra Bhanja Award
- Padmashree by Govt. Of India
