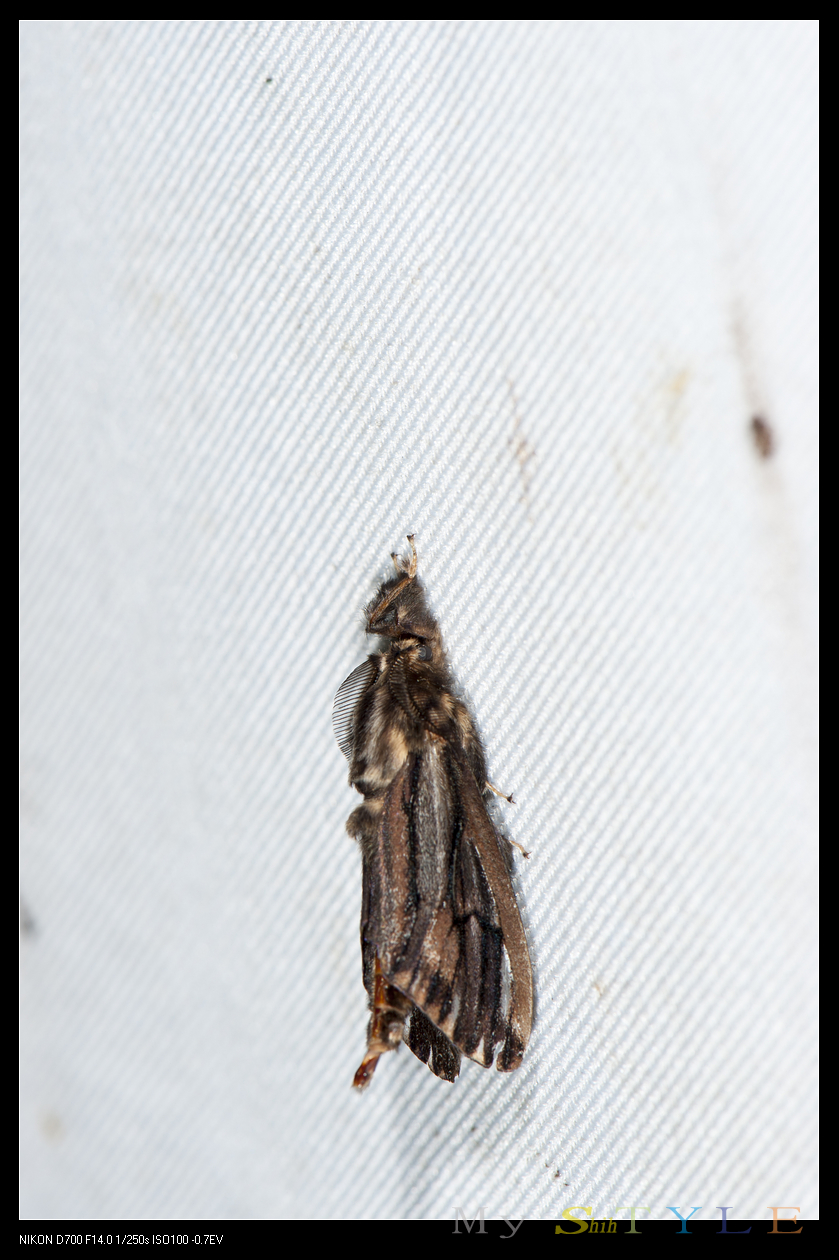
- Eumeta pryeri

Scientific classification
- Kingdom: Animalia
- Phylum: Arthropoda
- Class: Insecta
- Order: Lepidoptera
- Family: Psychidae
- Subfamily: Oiketicinae
- Tribe: Acanthopsychini
- Genus: Eumeta; Walker, 1855

Species
- See text

= Eumeta =

Genus of moths

Eumeta is a genus of bagworm moths. There are 18 described species found in Africa, Asia and Oceania.

== Species ==
- Eumeta bougainvillea
- Eumeta cervina
- Eumeta crameri
- Eumeta hardenbergi
- Eumeta layardi
- Eumeta maxima
- Eumeta mercieri
- Eumeta minuscula
- Eumeta moddermanni
- Eumeta nietneri
- Eumeta pictipennis
- Eumeta pryeri
- Eumeta rotunda
- Eumeta rougeoti
- Eumeta sikkima
- Eumeta strandi
- Eumeta variegata
- Eumeta wallacei
