= Eumeta variegata =

Scientific classification
- Kingdom: Animalia
- Phylum: Arthropoda
- Class: Insecta
- Order: Lepidoptera
- Family: Psychidae
- Genus: Eumeta
- Species: E. variegata

Binomial name
- Eumeta variegata (Snellen, 1879)

Synonyms
- Clania bougainvillea Strand, 1914; Eumeta maxima Butler, 1882; Eumeta sikkima Moore, 1891; Eumeta wallacei Swinhoe, 1892

Species of moth

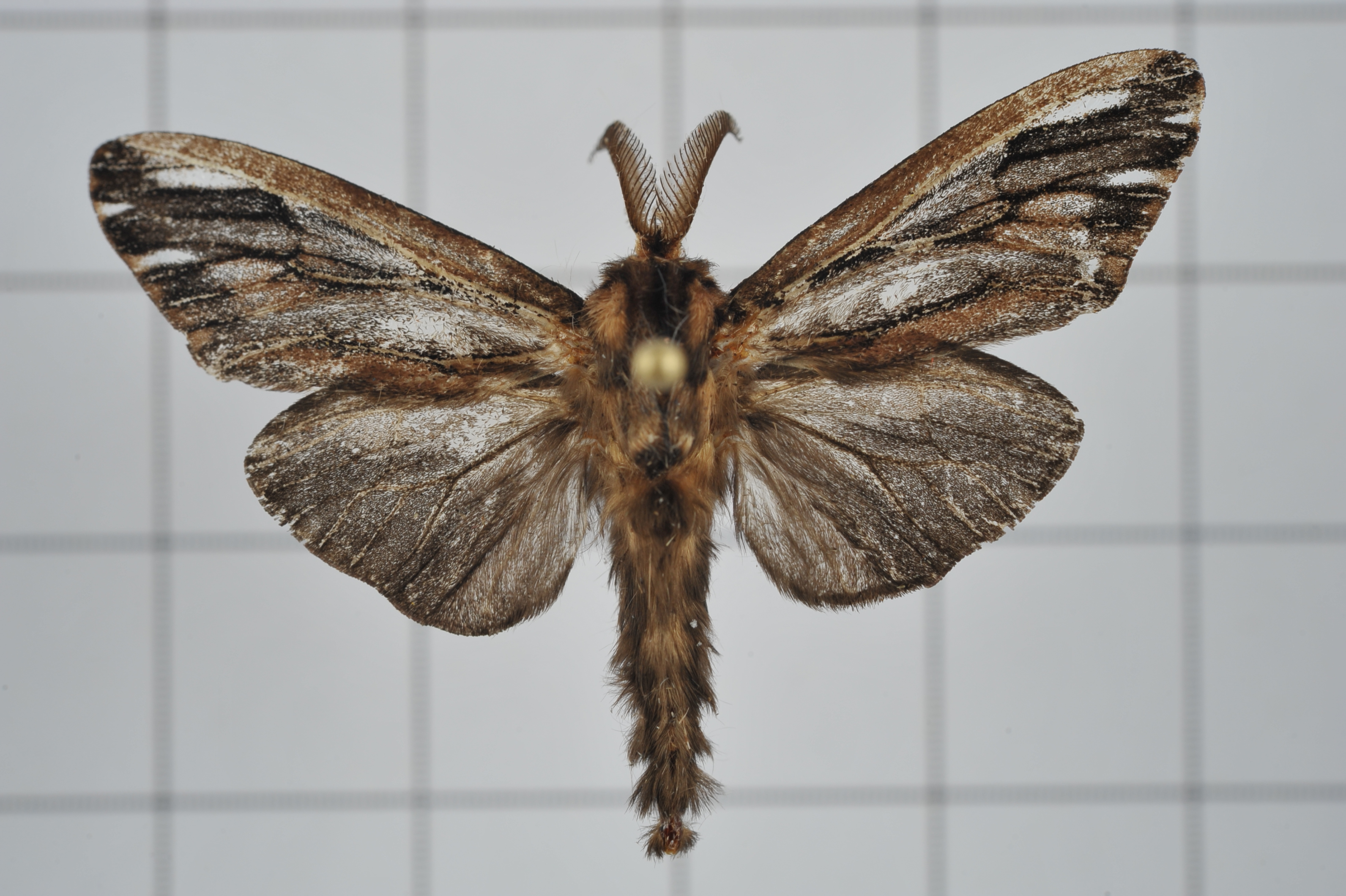

Eumeta variegata, commonly known as the paulownia bagworm or cotton bag worm, is a moth of the family Psychidae. The species was first described by Snellen in 1879. It is found in Japan, Papua New Guinea, India, the Solomon Islands and Sri Lanka.

== Description ==
Adults show strong sexual dimorphism. Adult females lack wings and live throughout their life in the larval case. Adult males have functional wings. This is due to that during final instar larvae, male show normal wing discs, whereas those of the female show rudimentary. The protective is about 5 cm in length. The silk is composed entirely of Glycine-Alanine repeats and poly-Alanine stretches.

In the male, wing discs proliferate rapidly in the eighth instar and continue proliferating. A conspicuous peripodial epithelium forms and the hemopoietic organs break down and disappear completely by the prepupal stage. Whereas in female, the wing discs remain as in the seventh instar, without proliferation of cells inside. Therefore, there is no peripodial epithelium formation and the hemopoietic organs are still attached to the wing discs. Finally the entire wing discs transform into a plain, thick epidermis in the prepupal period.

== Molecular basis ==
In 2018, the complete mitochondrial genome of the moth was sequenced using a nanopore sequencer as a single long read. It is the second report of a complete mitochondrial genome of psychid species.

== Ecology ==
It is a known pest of Citrus and tea cultivation, though it is considered to be polyphagous. It also a known pest of mango, cashew, casuarina, cinnamon, Shorea robusta.

The natural parasites of the species include: Apanteles claniae, Aulosaphes fujianensis, Chouioia cunea, Exorista japonica, Nealsomyia rufella, Sarcophaga caudagalli, and Sclerodermus guani. Pathogens are Bacillus thuringiensis and Nucleopolyhedrosis virus.

=== Host plants ===
- Acacia mangium
- Albizia
- Baccaurea ramiflora
- Camellia sinensis
- Casuarina equisetifolia
- Casuarina junghuhniana
- Ceiba pentandra
- Cinnamomum camphora
- Citrus
- Derris
- Hevea brasiliensis
- Hibiscus
- Lagerstroemia
- Mangifera indica
- Manihot esculenta
- Musa paradisiaca
- Myristica fragrans
- Palaquium
- Paraserianthes falcataria
- Peltophorum
- Pinus markusii
- Pinus roxburghii
- Piper
- Podocarpus macrophyllus
- Psidium guajava
- Ricinus
- Shorea robusta
- Theobroma cacao
- Uncaria gambir
- Vitis
