= Ravenshaw University =

Public Unitary University in Odisha, India

- Motto: "Jñānameva Shakti" "Knowledge is Power"
- Type: State University
- Established: 1868; 158 years ago (as College); 2006; 20 years ago (as University)
- Accreditation: NAAC
- Academic affiliations: UGC, AIU
- Chancellor: Governor of Odisha
- Vice-Chancellor: Arka Kumar Das Mohapatra
- Location: Cuttack, Odisha, India; 20°27′27.77″N 85°53′47.72″E
- Campus: 87 acres (350,000 m^{2}); Urban
- Colours: Brownish Red
- Website: ravenshawuniversity.ac.in

Ravenshaw University, formerly known as Ravenshaw College, is a co-educational state university situated in Cuttack, Odisha on the eastern coast of India. Founded as Ravenshaw College in 1868, the institution became a university in 2006. The university has nine schools, thirty three academic departments and a student enrolment of nearly 8,000. It is one of the oldest educational institutes in the country and its history is synonymous with the history of modern Odisha.

== History ==
=== Early years ===
After the great famine of 1866, the people of Odisha and some liberal Britons wanted to start a college at Cuttack. Thomas Edward Ravenshaw, officiating commissioner of Odisha Division made the government of Bengal realise the difficulties of Oriya students in getting college educations and succeeded in obtaining permission to start collegiate classes in the Cuttack Zilla School. Thus the first college in Odisha was born in January 1868 with intermediate classes and six students. Commissioner Ravenshaw proposed to convert the Collegiate School into a full-fledged degree college. The government of Bengal accepted the demand with the condition that a public contribution of Rs. 30,000 be deposited for the proposed college. Ravenshaw took up the matter as an object of personal interest and guaranteed the collection of the required amount. H. Woodrew, DPI of Bengal, supported Ravenshaw. H. J. Reynolds, secretary to the government of Bengal, requested the government of India to sanction the incidental charges and the post of the principal on the additional condition of meeting half the monthly expenses by public donation. Due to Ravenshaw's efforts and the financial support of the Maharaja of Mayurbhanj, HH Shri Krushna Chandra Bhanjdeo, the college department of the Collegiate School was converted in 1876 to a full-fledged Government Degree College bearing the name Cuttack College affiliated to the University of Calcutta. Samuel Ager was appointed as the first principal. The college had only 19 students. Krushna Chandra Bhanjdeo donated Rs. 20,000 as a permanent endowment which almost fulfilled the condition imposed by the government for public contribution. On Bhanjdeo's insistence the name was changed to Ravenshaw College in 1878 after Thomas Edward Ravenshaw to commemorate his services to the cause of education in Odisha. The college was granted permanent status by 1881. Growth in the initial days was slow. Altogether 94 graduates were produced by the closing year of the 19th century and the student strength had increased to 97. The science stream remained confined only to intermediate level until 1912 when Bihar and Odisha were separated from Bengal. It is the college where many Indian freedom fighters completed their graduation. There is no evidence of Thomas Edward Ravenshaw have a formal education. He came to India as an employee of the privately owned East India Company.

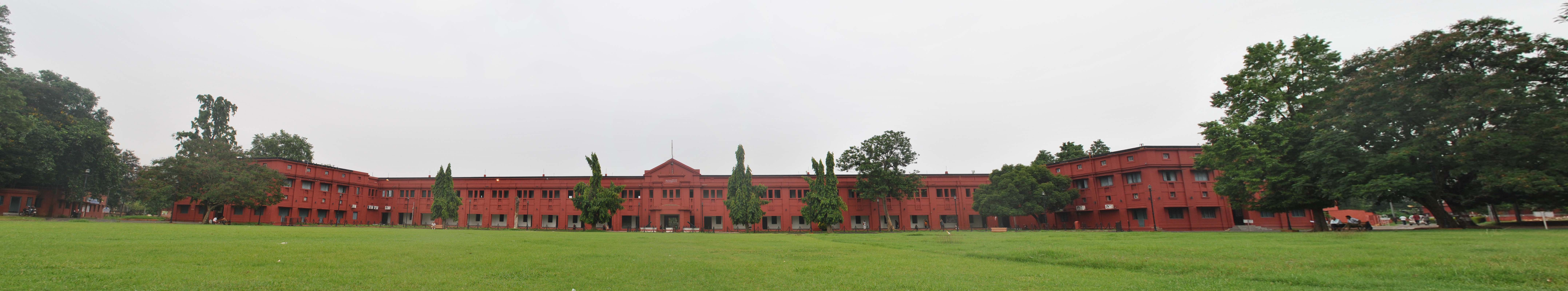
Panoramic view of Ravenshaw University, main entry, 2011

=== Ravenshaw in the 20th century ===
The college entered a new phase of development after 1912. School and survey classes were removed. Teachers of Indian Education Service were appointed as professors. New subjects such as Political Economy, Political Philosophy and honours in History and Persian were introduced. Infrastructure facilities for teaching of science at B.Sc. level were augmented. The student strength rose to 280 in 1912 and 375 in 1915. A new site (the present site) for the college at Chakkar Padia was located by the government to construct a complete set of new buildings at an approximate cost of Rs.10,00,000. In 1916 the University Bill proposed the transfer of Ravenshaw College from Calcutta University to Patna University. Although there was some public resistance for the change of affiliation, the then commissioner rightly supported the transfer by writing "Divorced from the Calcutta University, its progress would be rapid and in course of time it should be able to supply every educational need of the people of Odisha." Accordingly, the affiliation was transferred to newly created Patna University on 1 October 1917. The college was shifted to its present site in the erstwhile Chakkar Padia in 1921. While laying the foundation stone of the present building in November 1919 Sir Edward Gait, the governor of Bihar and Odisha wished that this mighty monument would one day grow into a university. The Maharaja of Mayurbhanj donated Rs. 1,00,000 for the electrification of the new building and purchase of equipment for science laboratories. A library building with an area of 9,000 sq ft (840 m^{2}) was opened in 1922 by Lt. Governor of Bihar and Odisha. Maharaja of Kanika Sri Rajendra Narayan Bhanjadeo generously donated Rs. 55,000 for its construction which stands today as a beautiful piece of architecture. In his honour the library is named Kanika Library and is very close to the hearts of educated Odias. In recognition of the public generosity, the government sanctioned Rs. 25,000 towards purchase of books for the new Kanika Library. After the shifting of the main library to the centenary building, the old premises houses the journal section. Legislators from Odisha such as Utkalmani Gopabandhu Das and Sri Krishna Mohapatra demanded time and again for further growth of the college in Bihar Odisha Legislative Council and Viceroy's Council. In the words of Krishna Mohapatra "Orissa had a pet child and that child was the Ravenshaw College." In response to public pressure, Mathematics honours got recognition by 1920. A year later affiliation was granted to B.Sc. in Botany and the college became a postgraduate institution with M.A. classes in English started in 1922 through the munificence of Maharani Smt. Parvati Devi, the queen of Sonepur, in granting Rs. 1,71,500 for its opening. The staff position of Ravenshaw College was strengthened with the appointment, in 1918, of scholars such as Sir Jaudunath Sarkar and R. P. Khosla as professors of History and Economics respectively. By 1922 the sanctioned strength of teaching staff had reached 31, out of which 13 came from Indian Education Service, two were Europeans and the rest were from provincial Education Service. Honours classes in Physics, Chemistry and Botany were opened from July 1930 and steps were initiated to start postgraduate teaching in all subjects which was fulfilled after Odisha became a separate province. Co-education began in 1929–30 with four girl students taking admission in the college. Their number gradually rose over the years. Medical facilities opened in the college with the appointment of a sub-assistant surgeon and medical examination became compulsory for all students from October 1929. The college remained affiliated to Patna University even after the separation of Odisha from Bihar in 1936. The affiliation was transferred to the newly created Utkal University in 1943.

=== Ravenshaw in the freedom struggle ===
Significant cultural, intellectual and political movements in the state were associated with the college. Notable individuals educated at the college include Madhusudan Das, Gopabandhu Das, Acharya Harihara Das, Nilakantha Das, Godabaris Mishra and Bhubanananda Das. Notable staff have included Artaballav Mohanty, Jadunath Sarkar, Sir Ross Masood, Pranakrushna Parija, Balabhadra Prasad, Acharya Jogeschandra Vidyanidhi, Mahendra Kumar Rout, Baba Kartar Singh, Parasuram Mishra, Shri P.A. Sunderam and A.K. Dasgupata. Most of the prominent political leaders of the state such as Shri Bansidhar Mishra( Surat Alley ), Shri Bishwanath Das, H.K. Mahatab, Shri Nityananda Kanungo, Shri S.N.Dwibedi, Shri Srinibas Mishra, Shri Biju Patnaik, Shri Nilamani Routray, Smt. Nandini Satpathy, Shri Janaki Ballabh Patnaik and Shri Rabi Ray were Ravenshavians. Ravenshaw's Assembly Hall was the venue of the Legislative Assembly of the new state of Odisha. It witnessed the debates of the legislators framing laws to govern the state. It remained so until the capital was shifted to Bhubaneswar.

=== Ravenshaw after independence ===
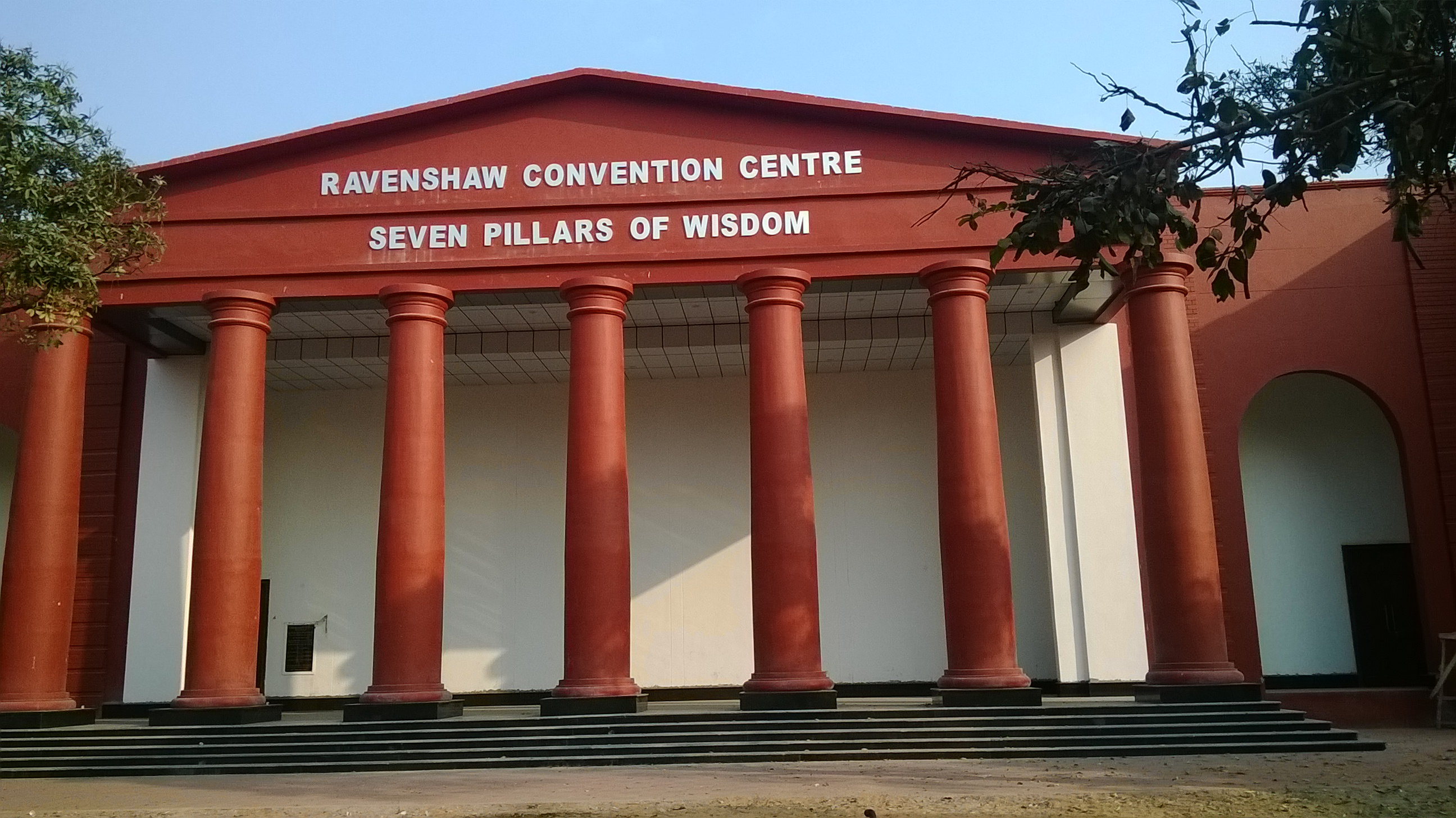
Ravenshaw Convention Centre

Indian Science Congress Association meet of 1962 was held in Ravenshaw College Quadrangle. The college achieved the unique distinction of being one of the three colleges of the country to have been awarded national honour by the government of India through the issue of a commemorative stamp in 1978. The college has seen 55 principals. It has been accorded autonomous status since 1989. It stands today on a sprawling campus of 87.4 acres (354,000 m^{2}). The magnificent red brick building of Gothic architecture has had several blocks added to it. The main library is in the new centenary library building. Government of Odisha accorded it unitary state university status in the year 2006 by passing the Ravenshaw University act. Subsequently, it got accredited with University Grants Commission under the section 2f of the UGC act. This was possible because of the efforts of the first vice-chancellor of the university, Devdas Chhotray. Since then a number of self-financing courses have been offered and the student strength has increased dramatically. Teaching is now imparted to more than 7000 students in arts, Science and Commerce, management, computer science, electronics and telecommunication, information technology and hotel and hospitality management. Altogether there are 33 academic departments out of which 28 have postgraduate teaching facility and M.Phil. and Ph.D. courses are available in 22 departments. In addition, several new courses have been added under autonomous functioning besides the regular courses. There are 11 hostels, 9 of which are on the campus, accommodating about 2,500 boarders. A new 140-acre campus is being built at Naraj in Cuttack. The college houses, besides Ravenshaw Junior College having student strength of 1536, the Cuttack Study Centre of Indira Gandhi National Open University having student strength of 1133, IAS Coaching Class and Pre-Examination Training Centre for SC/ST students.

== Academics ==
Ravenshaw University has nine degree-granting schools and they offer undergraduate programs in science, arts, commerce, management, computer science, electronics and telecommunication, hospitality and hotel management and information technology; graduate programs in science, arts, commerce, management (MBA) and computer application (MCA); and master of philosophy and doctoral degree programs in science, arts and commerce.

=== Schools and Departments ===
- School of Languages (Departments: Hindi, Odia, Sanskrit and English)
- School of Regional Studies & Earth Sciences (Departments: Geology and Geography)
- School of Social Sciences (Departments: Economics, History, Philosophy, Political Sciences, Psychology, Sociology, International Studies, Rural Development, Education and Journalism and Mass Communication)
- School of Life Sciences (Departments: Botany, Biochemistry, Biotechnology and Zoology)
- School of Mathematical Sciences (Departments: Mathematics and Statistics)
- School of Information & Computer Sciences (Departments: Electronics and Telecommunication, Information Science and Technology, Information Technology and Management, Computer Science and Computer Applications)
- School of Physical Sciences (Departments: Chemistry and Physics)
- School of Commerce (Department of Commerce)
- School of Management Studies (Departments: Business Administration, Hospitality & Hotel Administration, Integrated MBA in Financial Markets and MBA)

=== Admissions ===
Admissions to various undergraduate, graduate, master of philosophy and doctoral degree programs are made through entrance examinations held every year.

=== Research ===
Ravenshaw has been at the forefront of the research activities since its inception. Established as the first institution of Odisha for higher education, master of philosophy and doctoral degrees were awarded by the various departments of Ravenshaw for the first time in the history of Odisha. However, keeping in mind the changing scenario of modern science and technology, its research infrastructure and library facilities are now being augmented through external research grants and internal resources. Currently 22 departments of the university offer master of philosophy and doctoral degrees.

== Campus ==
The current campus sits on an 87-acre campus in the heart of Cuttack. The campus is located very close to the Cuttack railway station, and is only about a 45 minutes’ drive from the Bhubaneswar airport. The university has acquired another 140 acres of land on the bank of the river Mahanadi, to build the second campus for its new disciplines of management and applied sciences. The foundation stone of the new campus at Naraj has been laid by Naveen Patnaik.

=== Hostels ===
The university has 13 hostels, 7 for boys and 6 for girls. These hostels accommodate 1400 boys and 2200 girls students. Mahanadi and Lalitgiri hostels with capacity to accommodate 600 girls and 400 boys were recently inaugurated by Naveen Patnaik.

=== Ravenshaw Radio ===
Ravenshaw Radio 90.4 MHz is Odisha's first campus community radio station (CRS). It started broadcasting from April 2011. However, it has faced repeated problems and failed to provide continuous broadcasting services to the students and local community.

== Notable alumni ==
- Rahul Shrivastava, IFS Officer & Ambassador to Namibia
- Madhusudan Das, Lawyer, Freedom fighter, Social activist, Minister
- Baidyanath Misra, former Vice-Chancellor of the Odisha University of Agriculture and Technology, Chairman of Odisha State Planning Board and Chairman of Odisha's First State Finance Commission.
- Utkalamani Gopabandhu Das, social worker, reformer, political activist, journalist, poet and essayist.
- Nabakrushna Choudhury, former Chief Minister of Odisha and freedom fighter
- Biju Patnaik, former Chief Minister of Odisha and freedom fighter, Pilot
- Janaki Ballabh Patnaik, former Chief Minister of Odisha, 25th Governor of Assam.
- Biren Mitra, former Chief Minister of Odisha
- Harekrushna Mahatab, former Chief Minister of Odisha
- Dayanidhi Choudhury, former Chief Conservator of Forests, First Odia IFS
- Bishwanath Das, former Chief Minister of Odisha and freedom fim fighter
- Nilamani Routray, former Chief Minister of Odisha
- Nandini Satpathy, former Chief Minister of Odisha
- Pradip Kumar Mohanty, former Chief Justice of Jharkhand High Court
- Bira Kishore Ray, first Chief Justice of Orissa High Court
- Sukanta Kishore Ray, former Chief Justice of Orissa High Court
- Gopal Ballav Pattanaik, former Chief Justice of India
- Sarangadhar Das, Indian nationalist revolutionary & politician
- Kalicharan Pattnaik, was an eminent literary and artistic figure of Odisha
- Ramesh Chandra Panda, is an Social activist and former Member of Odisha Legislative Assembly, for the Ranpur Assembly constituency
- Annada Shankar Ray, indian writer & essayist
- Gopinath Mohanty, Jnanpith award-winning writer
- Prana Krushna Parija, Academician, Scientist
- Prabhat Nalini Das, Public Intellectual, Vice-Chancellor, Academician, Feminist, Dean IIT Kanpur
- Manoj Das, Indian author
- Manoranjan Das, Indian writer
- Artaballabha Mohanty, Indian writer, literary critique
- Biswajit Das, short story writer, film director and script writer
- Buddhaditya Mohanty, Indian actor
- Akshaya Mohanty, Indian singer, lyricist, composer, musician and writer
- Bidhu Bhusan Das, Public Intellectual, Academic, Vice-Chancellor, DPI Odisha
- Deepak Mohanty, executive director, Reserve Bank of India
- Oopali Operajita, Distinguished Fellow, Carnegie Mellon University; Odissi Exponent; Adviser to India's Parliamentary Leaders
- Amitav Acharya, Academician
- Trilochan Pradhan, Scientist, Academician
- Ibrahim Suhrawardy, linguist and author
- Farhat Amin, journalist and social activist
- Sitakant Mahapatra, notable Oriya poet, Jnanpith Award
- R.C. Majumdar, Historian, ex Vice-Chancellor of Dhaka University.
- Kalindi Charan Panigrahi, Writer, Padma Bhushan awardee
- Jogesh Pati, Academician, Scientist
- Gopal Krishna Sarangi, Energy Economist
- Sarojini Sahoo, feminist writer, blogger and columnist
- Ramesh Prasad Mohapatra, archaeologist, Indologist, scholar of Odishan studies, art historian
- Rabi Ray, former Speaker of Lok Sabha
- Chintamani Panigrahi, activist, politician and former Governor of Manipur
- Jayanta Mahapatra, poet
- Sachidananda Rout Roy, poet and Jnanpith awardee
- Mayadhar Mansingh, poet and educationist
- Rudra Madhab Ray, member of parliament
- Radhakant Nayak, member of parliament
- Kamakhya Prasad Singh Deo, member of parliament
- Ranganath Misra, former Chief Justice of India
- Lalit Mansingh, former foreign secretary of India
- Karamat Ali Karamat Indian Urdu language poet, author, literary critic and mathematician.
- Devdas Chhotray, Administrator, Writer, Poet
- Pratibha Ray, Jnanpith award-winning writer
- Ajay Kumar Parida, Indian Biologist
- Atanu Kumar Pati, Indian Zoologist
- Michael Patra, Indian economist and Deputy Governor of the RBI
- Subrat Kumar Prusty, linguist, Presidential award of Maharshi Badrayan Vyas Samman-winning Researcher
- Pratap Jena, former Cabinet Minister of Odisha
- Soumya Ranjan Patnaik, editor of Sambad, Politician, Parliamentarian
- Bansidhar Mishra(Surat Alley), Freedom fighter, founder of the British Communist Party in London.
- Srinibas Mishra, Ex MP Lok Sabha, Cuttack.

== Notable faculty ==
- Sir Jadunath Sarkar, former Vice-Chancellor of University of Calcutta
- Sir Ross Masood
- Jagannath Prasad Das (psychologist)
- Prana Krushna Parija, Indian Botanist
- Prabhat Nalini Das, first Director/Dean of the Humanities Division at the Indian Institute of Technology, Kanpur
