= Ramesh Prasad Mohapatra =

Indian archaeologist and art historian (1939–1989)

- Born: 1 October 1939; Bhapur, Dhenkanal, Odisha, India
- Died: 14 January 1989 (aged 49); Bhubaneswar
- Education: Ravenshaw College, Utkal University
- Known for: Studies on Odia cultural history, art, archaeology
- Awards: Director General Prize, Archaeological Survey of India; Puri Memorial Prize, Archaeological Survey of India; Citation by Odisha History Congress
- Scientific career
- Fields: Archaeology; Indology; Odishan Studies; Odia Art; Odisha History; Orissan Culture
- Workplaces: Odisha State Museum, INTACH
- Doctoral advisor: K . C. Panigrahi

Ramesh Prasad Mohapatra (1 October 1939 – 14 January 1989) was an Indian archaeologist and scholar on Odia Studies. He served as curator for archaeology at the Odisha State Museum from 1963 to 1989 and made significant contributions to historical research, especially in the fields of archaeology, art history, religion, and other aspects of Odia cultural history.

== Early life and education ==
Mohapatra was born in an orthodox Brahmin family with connections to the royal family of Dhenkanal, something that greatly helped him in his later work on Military History of Odisha. He was the eldest son of Sitanath Paramguru, then the Zamindar of the village, and Moti Devi and married to Kusum Mohapatra.

Mohapatra received his master's degree in history from Ravenshaw College in Cuttack, India and obtained a diploma from the Delhi School of Archaeology of the Archaeological Survey of India, New Delhi. He obtained his Ph.D. for his work on the Udayagiri and Khandagiri Caves from Utkal University, Bhubaneswar in 1976. His thesis outlines the importance of the twin caves of Udayagiri and Khandagiri in the development of Indian art and architecture, associated with the Kalinga emperor Kharavela. These caves represent India's earliest examples of Jaina architecture. In 1979, Mohapatra obtained a DLitt from Utkal University for his work Jaina Monuments of Odisha, presenting a systematic study of Jaina monuments of Odisha.

Mohapatra was initiated to historical research by N. K. Sahu with whom he had worked in 1962 (Utkal University History of Odisha, vol I, 1964, preface). After joining the Odisha state museum as curator for archaeology, he took up research in field archaeology and Odia art under the guidance of K. C. Panigrahi.

Mohapatra's reference book Archaeology in Odisha published in two volumes, presents details of prehistoric and historical archaeology in the thirteen districts of Odisha. His collection of art treasures, antiquities, and archaeological artifacts collected during his fieldwork is now in the Odisha State Museum.

Mohapatra served on many committees both nationally and internationally. He was nominated as a member of the Odisha Lalit Kala Akademi.

== Books ==
- Mohapatra, R. P. (1981). Udayagiri and Khandagiri Caves. Delhi, India: D.K. Publications. pp. xxii+270. OCLC 8069640.
- Mohapatra, R. P. (1984). Jaina monuments of Odisha. New Delhi, India: D.K. Publications. pp. xviii+254. OCLC 11645559.
- Mohapatra, R. P. (1986). Military History of Odisha. New Delhi, India: Cosmo Publications. pp. xii+336. OCLC 18694583.
- Mohapatra, R. P. (1986). Archaeology in Odisha (Sites and Monuments). New Delhi, India: B. R. Publishing Corp. ISBN 978-81-7018-348-8.
- Mohapatra, R. P. (1992). Fashion Styles of Ancient India. New Delhi, India: B. R. Publishing Corp. ISBN 81-7018-723-0.
- Mohapatra, R. P. (1989). Temple Legends of Odisha. Bhubaneswar: Odisha Sahitya Academy. pp. vii+104. OCLC 29859455.
- Mohapatra, R. P. (1991). Decorative art of Parasuramesvar Temple. Bhubaneswar: Odisha State Museum. OCLC 29335479.
- Mohapatra, R. P.; Donaldson T. E. (1998). Ornaments of Odisha. Delhi, India: B. R. Publishing Corp. pp. xv+326. ISBN 978-81-7646-031-6.

== Selected articles ==
Serial No.	Article Name	Published On(Source)
1	Griddles as depicted in temple sculpture of Bhubaneswar	O.H.R.J, Vol. XII/1
2	Two Patta Paintings of Jagannath in Odisha State Museum	O.H.R.J, Vol. XIII/4
3	Names of the Caves of Udayagiri and Khandagiri	O.H.R.J, Vol. XXII/3&4
4	Winged and Enigmatic animal figures in Udayagiri caves of Odisha	O.H.R.J, Vol. XXIII/1-4
5	Position of Women as depicted in the early sculptures of Udayagiri and Khandagiri	O.H.R.J, Vol. XXIV, XXv, and XXVI
6	Tradition in Architecture	Art Tradition of Odisha, Odisha Sahitya Academy, Bhubaneswar, 1982
7	Krishna Theme in Odia sculpture	O.H.R.J, Vol. XXXI No. 2,3,4
8	Folk elements of Udayagiri and Khandagiri Caves in Odisha	International Seminar on Folk Culture, 1978, Edited by Prof. K. S. Behera, etc.
9	Tirthankar and Sasanadevis of Khandagiri Caves	In Proceedings of the International Seminar on Buddhism and Jainism
10	Architecture of Jaina religion shrines of Odisha	Bharati, Prof. R. C. Majumdar Volume, Dept. of Ancient Indian History and Culture, Banaras Hindu University, Banaras
11	Problem of Kalinga Jina	in Krishna Pratibha, Commemoration volume for Dr. K. C. Panigrahi, Edited by Dr. H. C. Das, etc.

Note: O.H.R.J: Odisha Historical Research Journal
