= Bidhu Bhusan Das =

- Born: 11 April 1922; Puri, Odisha
- Died: 2 June 1999 (aged 77); Bhubaneswar, Odisha
- Education: A.M. Columbia University; M.Litt. University of Oxford
- Occupations: Professor, University President/Vice Chancellor
- Years active: 1943 - 1999
- Spouse: Prabhat Nalini Das
- Children: 3, Oopali Operajita
- Relatives: Sarala Devi (Aunt); Nityanand Kanungo (Uncle)

Bidhu Bhusan Das, also spelled Bidhubhusan Das (11 April 1922 – 2 June 1999), was a public intellectual, educator, professor, senior government official, and university president/Vice Chancellor from India.

== Background and education ==
Bidhubhusan Das was born in Puri Odisha in 1922 in a well known Karan family. He was the eldest child of Rai Bahadur Durga Charan Das, a senior government official in both British India and independent India, and the poet Nirmala Devi. Das received an A.M. from Columbia University and an M.Litt. from Christ Church, Oxford University. Earlier, he earned an M.A. in English from Patna University.

== Career ==
Das started teaching in Ravenshaw University in 1944. He became Sonepur Professor of English at Ravenshaw in 1950. In 1959, he was appointed Advisor to King Mahendra of Nepal as part of the Indian Aid Mission under the Colombo Plan, and wrote the entire set of statutes that established Kathmandu's Tribhuvan University. He was Principal of Ranchi College (now Dr Shyama Prasad Mukherjee University) from 1963 to 1968, and Principal of Ravenshaw University in 1968. After this, from 1968 until 1980, he was Director of Public Instruction and Vice Chancellor of Utkal University. Das taught English and American literature, comparative literature, linguistics and philosophy at Ravenshaw, Tribhuvan, Ranchi, Utkal and NEHU (Shillong) Universities. He was appointed advisor to chief minister Jamir of Nagaland and helped set up Nagaland University, a central university, in 1989.

== Family ==
Das and his wife, Prabhat Nalini Das, had three children, including Oopali Operajita. Das's maternal aunt was the leader, feminist, writer and social activist Sarala Devi. Das's maternal uncle, Nityanand Kanungo, was a prominent Indian politician from the state of Odisha.

== Publications ==
- "Some Criteria of Acceptability in Translation". Journal of Literary Studies. 13 (2). 1989.
- Literary Criticism - A Reading. Oxford University Press. 1985.
- Amrutara Santana - The Dynasty of The Immortals by Gopinath Mohanty, translated by Bidhubhusan Das, Prabhat Nalini Das and Oopali Operajita. Sahitya Akademi, New Delhi. 2015. ISBN 978-81-260-4746-8
