= Artaballabha Mohanty =

Indian writer, literary critic (1887–1969)

Prof. Dr. Artaballabha Mohanty
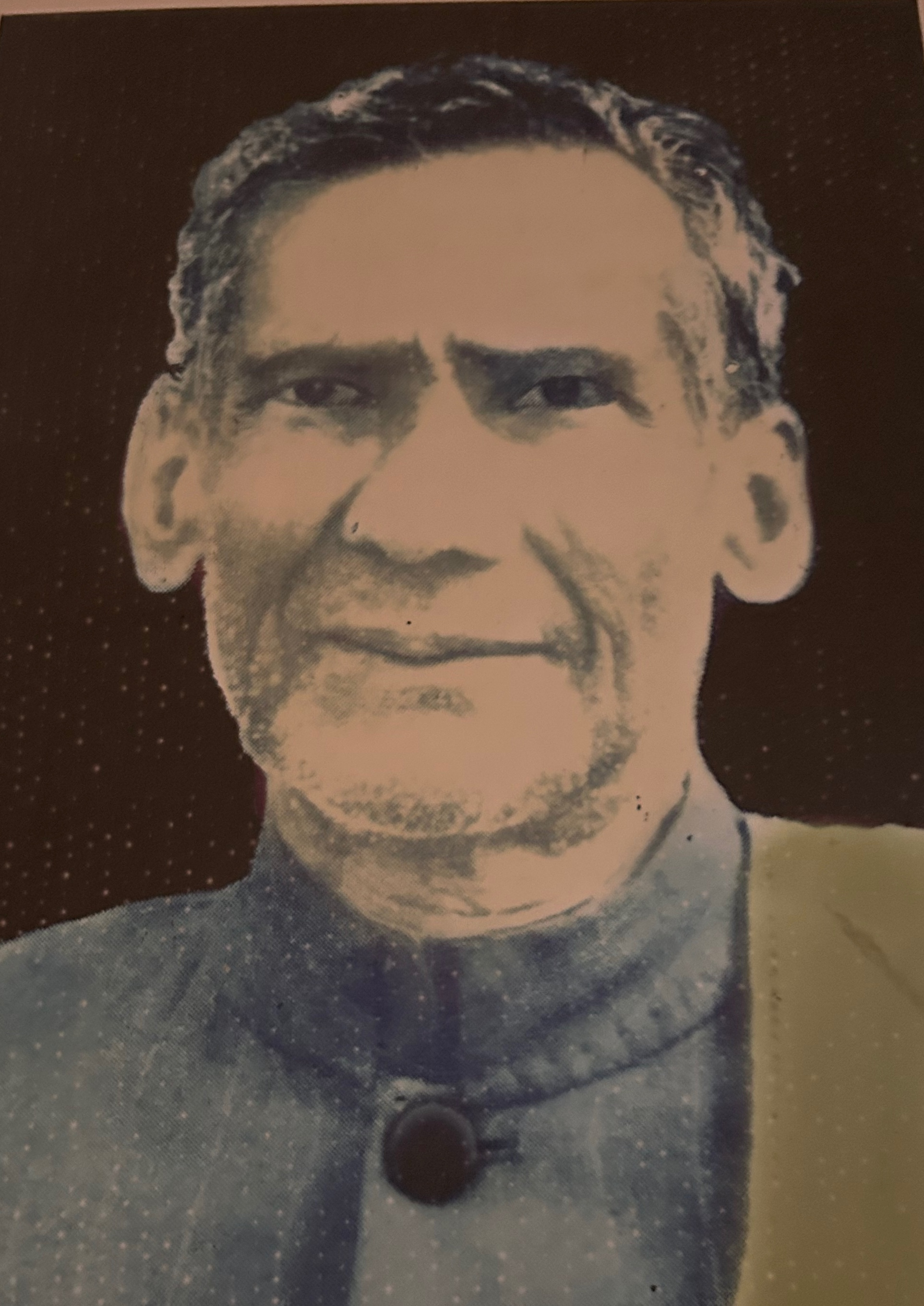
- Born: 30 July 1887; Cuttack, British India
- Died: 30 September 1963 (aged 75–76)
- Education: Ravenshaw College, University of Calcutta
- Writing career
- Genre: Literature
- Notable awards: Padma Shri

Artaballabha Mohanty, was a notable writer and literary critic. He is best known for recovering and publishing ancient Odia manuscripts, including palm-leaf texts, temple chronicles, and devotional poetry, thereby preserving much of Odisha’s literary heritage. A professor at Ravenshaw College, he edited numerous medieval works such as the Sarala Mahabharata and Madala Panji, and was among the first to trace the origins of Odia literature to Charyagiti. For his contributions, he received honors including Rai Sahib, Rai Bahadur, Padma Shri, Vidya Bhushana and the honorary Doctor of Literature from Utkal University.

== Early life and education ==
Mohanty was born in 1887 in Naganpur, Cuttack district, Odisha. He received his early education at the Mission Higher English School in Cuttack, and later studied at Bhabanipur. He completed his Intermediate Arts and then pursued Sanskrit at Ravenshaw College, Cuttack, which was affiliated with the University of Calcutta. He graduated with Honours in Sanskrit and subsequently earned his M.A. in Sanskrit from Presidency College, Calcutta, in 1914.

== Academic career ==
In 1914, Mohanty joined Ravenshaw College as a lecturer in Sanskrit. He was promoted to assistant professor after eight years and continued teaching there until his retirement in 1947, serving a total of 33 years in the Education Department. As a teacher, he inspired his students to appreciate their mother tongue and its literature. He was instrumental in introducing Honours courses in Odia at Ravenshaw College and later played a key role in establishing the Postgraduate Department of Odia at Utkal University after its founding in 1946.

== Literary contributions ==
Mohanty’s most significant scholarly work was through the Prachi Samiti, where he recovered, edited, and published numerous palm-leaf manuscripts. His editions included medieval kavyas, devotional poetry, treatises on chhanda, chaupadi koili, temple chronicles like the Madala Panji, and inscriptions. He resolved longstanding debates on authorship and chronology of classical Odia texts and was one of the first to connect Odia literature to Charyagiti traditions. He also recognized Odia writers’ contributions to Brajaboli literature.

Among his discoveries was Rudrasudhanidhi, an early Odia prose text, and his edition of the Sarala Mahabharatabecame a landmark in Odia literary scholarship. He also brought attention to 16th-century saint literature, 17th–18th-century kavya literature, and Mahima cult texts.

His scholarly introductions to these works often spanned hundreds of pages and provided historical, cultural, and literary analysis, inaugurating a new phase in Odia literary criticism. His final project was a new edition of the Sarala Mahabharata, completed shortly before his death

== Associations and cultural work ==
Mohanty was deeply involved in Odisha’s literary and cultural organizations. He served as working president and later vice-president of the Utkala Sahitya Samaja, and was an active member of the Orissa Sahitya Academy. He also served on the Odia Advisory Board of the Sahitya Akademi, New Delhi, and was associated with the Utkala Sangita Samaja due to his interest in music.

== Awards and medals ==
- The British Government appreciated his valuable services as an educationist and scholar and gave him the title of Rai Sahib in 1931 and Rai Bahadur in 1943.
- Padma Shri, (1960) by the Government of India
- Utkal University decorated him with the title of Doctor of Literature.
- Vidya Bhushana, Andhra Research Society

== Personal life and Character ==
Colleagues and contemporaries described Mohanty as a scholar of profound erudition as well as a warm and amiable personality. He was known for his subtle sense of humor, his deep pride in Odisha’s cultural heritage, and his ability to inspire affection in students and peers alike. An oft-recounted anecdote describes how he fondly referred to a younger colleague as his Neula Bhai (“mongoose brother”), reflecting his affectionate and familial approach to friendship. He was also careful to promote Odisha’s reputation in wider scholarly circles, often encouraging and supporting Sanskrit scholars from the region to represent the state at national conventions.Remembered as both a pioneering academic and a cultured gentleman, Mohanty left a legacy that combined scholarship, mentorship, and personal warmth.

== Legacy ==
Mohanty stands as a consequential figure in the intellectual and cultural history of Odisha.

Preserver of Medieval Odia Heritage

- As a pioneering editor of early Odia classics, he safeguarded the textual heritage of the region and transformed the way Odia literature was studied, taught, and valued in the 20th century that might otherwise have been lost.
- Mohanty’s most enduring contribution was his retrieval and critical editing of ancient Odia works from fragile palm-leaf manuscripts that he later donated to Ravenshaw University.

Influential Teacher and Academic Leader

- As a professor at Ravenshaw College, Mohanty shaped generations of students, many of whom became leading scholars, writers, and cultural custodians.
- His dual mastery of Odia and Sanskrit allowed him to bridge classical traditions with modern literary sensibilities, influencing curriculum design and research standards in Odisha’s higher education.

Cultural Leadership and Institutional Impact

- The Prachi Samiti under his guidance became a hub for literary preservation, research, and publication—setting a precedent for later archival and academic initiatives in Odisha.
- His work aligned with the broader Odia linguistic and cultural renaissance of the early 20th century, reinforcing the distinct identity of the language at a time when regional literatures were asserting themselves in colonial and postcolonial India. In honor of this, there are scholarships for achievements in Odia language at Ravenshaw University, Cuttack, Odisha.
