= Ravenshaw Radio =

Coordinates: 20.463138°N 85.894755°E

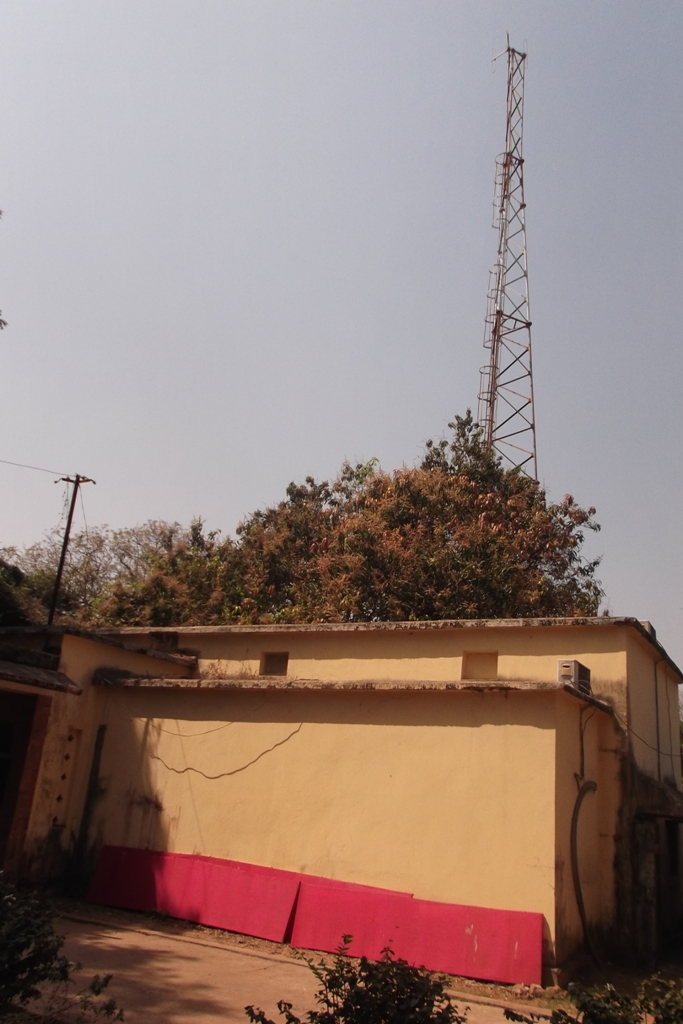
Building of Ravenshaw Radio

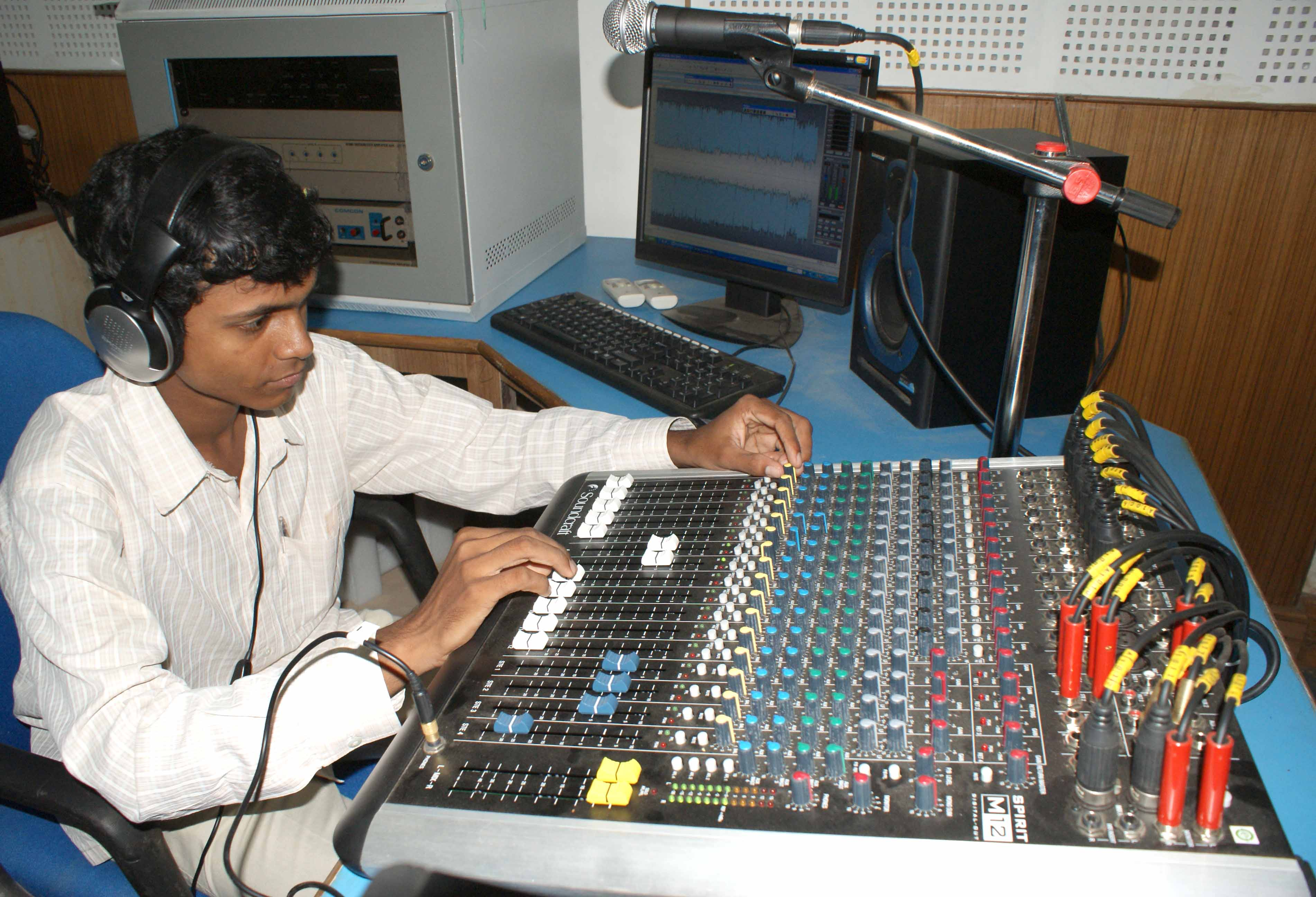
Studio of Ravenshaw Radio

Ravenshaw Radio is the community radio station (CRS) of Ravenshaw University, Cuttack, Odisha, India. It is the first campus community radio station in Odisha, and was launched on 14 April 2011, the Oriya New Year. It was opened by the Vice-Chancellor of Ravenshaw University, Sri Devdas Chhotray.

Programs on Ravenshaw Radio are broadcast through a low-power 50-watt transmitter, and can be heard on 90.4 MHz within an 8 - 10 km radius. The station caters primarily to the university's students.
