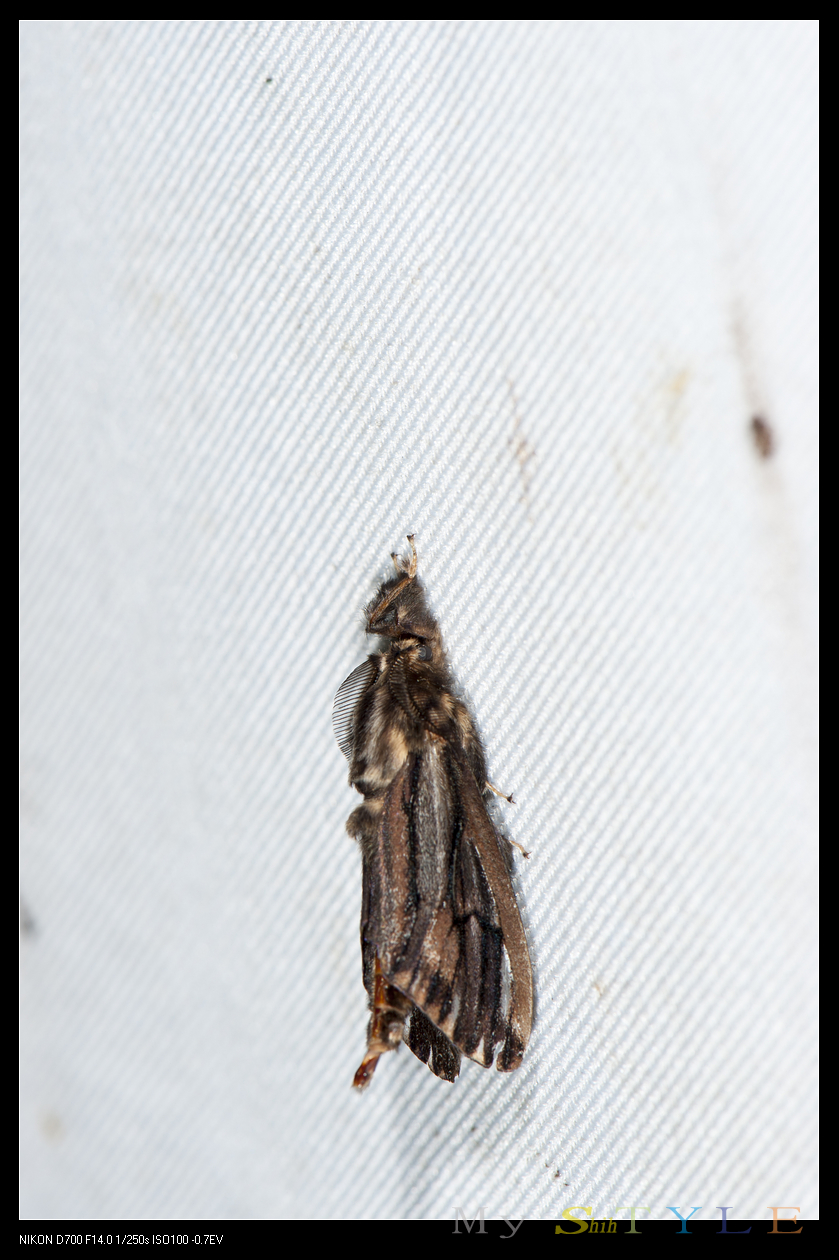

Scientific classification
- Domain: Eukaryota
- Kingdom: Animalia
- Phylum: Arthropoda
- Class: Insecta
- Order: Lepidoptera
- Family: Psychidae
- Genus: Eumeta
- Species: E. pryeri

Binomial name
- Eumeta pryeri Leech, 1889

= Eumeta pryeri =

Species of moth

Eumeta pryeri is a moth of the family Psychidae. It is found in China and Taiwan.
