= Deba Prasad Das =

- Born: 1932; Keul Chabi Sua, Cuttack, India
- Died: 16 July 1986 (aged 53–54)
- Occupation: Classical dancer
- Awards: Sangeet Natak Akademi Award; Odisha Sangeet Natak Akademi Award; World Development Corporation Award
- Website: Official web site

Deba Prasad Das was an Indian classical dancer, considered by critics and connoisseurs as one of the four first generation gurus of the Indian classical dance form of Odissi. His Odissi style is robust and unique. He was a recipient of the 1977 Sangeet Natak Akademi Award. and 1974 Odisha Sangeet Natak Akademi Award.

== Biography ==
Deba Prasad Das was born in 1932 in a Karana family at a small village near Cuttack called Keul Chabi Sua, in the Indian state of Odisha to Indramani Devi and Durga Charan Das, a police officer. He lost his mother at an early age and was brought up by his grandfather who was a local violin player. Das did his early schooling at Puri and started picking up music and dance at the age of six from a nearby traditional school (Pathara Akhara) run by Mohan Chandra Mohapatra. However, he had to move to Behrampur when his father was transferred there.

When Das was 14, his father sent him to the music school of Radha Raman Ray, a music director working with New Theatres. He worked there for a monthly salary of approximately ₹ 3 plus food and assisted the performers in the green room. Soon, he worked his way up as a gate man, a ticket collector and finally as a prompter. The break came when Guru Pankaj Charan Das and later, Moha Mohapatra started associating themselves with the New theatre and Das got a small role, appearing only at the beginning of the dance cramas. Later, when New Theatres closed down in 1949, he moved to Annapurna and worked there for a few years where he had the opportunity to work alongside the renowned Odissi exponents such as Pankaj Charan Das, Kelucharan Mohapatra, Kumar Dayal Sharan and Mayadhar Raut. Annapurna also became defunct by 1953 by which time Deb Das had already mastered the dance form of Odissi.

The next move was to Utkal Sangeet Mahavidyalaya, a school of dance music, where Das joined as a faculty member for Odissi in 1964. Here, he tutored Indrani Rahman a Bharatanatyam dancer at that time, whom he taught Odissi. and the association with Rahman brought Das into public notice when the Rahman took her guru along with her for concerts. In 1957, Indrani Rahman presented an Odissi demonstration choreographed by Deba Prasad Das at the Dance Festival and this performance is reported to have assisted Odissi to be taken notice as a classical dance form. Later, in the same year, Rahman made her debut performance of Odissi at a show witnessed by Kapila Vatsyayan, Charles Fabri and others, and this is known to have brought the Deba Das style of Odissi into public notice.'Sabda Swara Pata' is an important feature of this style of Odissi.

Das, a representative of Gotipua Odissi culture and considered by many as one of the four first generation gurus of Odissi, is known to be founder of the Deba Prasad Gharana. He had many disciples such as Indrani Rahman, Bijayalaxmi Mohanty, Oopali Operajita, Pushpa Mahanti, Srinath Raut, Sudhakar Sahoo, Durga Charan Ranbir, Dhuleswar Behera, Anita Singhdeo, Sangeeta Dash, Sujata Mishra, Ramli Ibrahim, Gajendra Panda, Manoj Behera, Gopa Biswhas, Gayatri Chand, Atashi Tripathy are among many others who have emerged as noted exponents of Odissi. Notable Bharatanatyam guru Leela Ramanathan had also taken Odissi training under him. He has also choreographed many dance dramas and solo numbers.

Deba Prasad Das died on 16 July 1986, aged 54.

== Awards and recognitions ==
Recipient of Senior Research Fellowship from the Government of India, Deba Prasad Das also received the World Development Corporation award in 1983 and the Odisha Sangeet Natak Akademi Award in 1974. Sangeet Natak Akademi honored him with their annual award in 1977. A book on him and his work "Guru Debaprasad Das: Icon of Odissi" was authored by Gayatri Chand, a senior dancer of Deba Prasad Das style, after 25 years of his demise in 2012.

== See also ==
- Odissi
- Indrani Rahman
