= Prabhat Nalini Das =

First Director/Dean of the Humanities Division at IIT Kanpur

Prabhat Nalini Das (19 December 1927 – 14 November 2018) was an Indian public intellectual, academic and university president. She served as a professor of English and head of the English Department at Lady Shri Ram College, Delhi University; Indian Institute of Technology, Kanpur; Utkal University and Ranchi University. She was the first Director/Dean of the Humanities Division at the Indian Institute of Technology, Kanpur; Founder-Professor and Head of the Department of English at Utkal University for almost 19 years, and Chairman of Utkal University's Post Graduate Council; and the Pro-Vice-Chancellor of North Eastern Hill University, a Central University established by an act of the Parliament of India, with independent charge of its Kohima, Nagaland campus.

== Early life and education ==
Das was born in 1927 to Krishna Priya Devi and Radha Krishna Das in a Karan family, professor and head of the Physics Department at Ravenshaw University. She received a B.A. (Hons.) in English from Ravenshaw University and an M.A. in English at the University of Allahabad. She earned another Masters in English at the University of Minnesota, where she studied as a Fulbright Smith-Mundt Scholar, and received the Fellowship Association of the University of Minnesota Prize from the Department of English. She was awarded an honorary D.Litt. by Ravenshaw University in 2011.

== Academic career ==
Prabhat Nalini Das taught at Ravenshaw University, and Sailabala Women's College, Cuttack, before becoming head of the Department of English at Lady Shri Ram College, Delhi University. She was also Lady Shri Ram College's Vice Principal and, for a period, its Acting Principal. She was appointed the first Director/Dean of Humanities at the Indian Institute of Technology (IIT) in Kanpur. She was subsequently head of the Department of English at Ranchi University, a senior research fellow at the American Studies Research Centre, Hyderabad, and founder-professor and head of the Department of English at Utkal University for almost 19 years. Das also served as Pro-Vice-Chancellor of the North Eastern Hill University (NEHU), Shillong, with independent charge of its Kohima campus, in Nagaland. She was a Fellow at the Shakespeare Institute at the University of Birmingham, located at Stratford-upon-Avon, as a recipient of a British Council Fellowship.

== Other activities ==
=== Orissa textiles ===
Das was involved in the revival of the Orissa ikat saris and southern Orissa's Berhampur silk saris, as well as its tussar (raw silk) saris. She began designing her own saris in 1951, aged 23, starting off at the "Mata Matha" in Cuttack. Part of her collection of saris was requested for display at The Smithsonian during the Festival of India in the United States in 1985.

=== National committees and organizations ===
Prabhat Nalini Das was a member of the governing council of the Indian Council for Cultural Relations in the late 1970s, nominated by Kamaladevi Chattopadhyay. She was included on the selection and advisory committees of the Union Public Service Commission, which selects candidates for India's elite civil services; the University Grants Commission, the Central Sahitya Akademi, the Jnanpith Awards Selection Committee, and the National School of Drama. She was on the board of directors of the Life Insurance Corporation of India for one term, and was a special advisor on education, women's rights, arts and culture and development to Maharaja Rajendra Narayan Singh Deo during his tenure as Chief Minister of Odisha. She was a Founder-Trustee of the Centre for World Solidarity and an advisor to the Centre for Youth and Social Development. She also served as an advisor to the Indian Institute of Public Administration.

=== Patron of Odissi arts ===
Together with her husband, Professor Bidhu Bhusan Das, she supported and patronized Odissi dance and music, and set up an international film screening and appreciation society, first in Ravenshaw College in the early 1950s, and later in Bhubaneswar. She also encouraged and patronized Oriya and English theatre from 1951 onwards. The couple helped Guru Kelucharan Mohapatra, Guru Pankaj Das and Guru Deba Prasad Das with their careers at various points. Das and her husband produced several plays at Ravenshaw University, as well as starting Odisha's first film appreciation society at the university in the early 1950s. They were patrons of many theatre movements in Odisha, including the Bhubaneswar-based Renaissance Theatre Group, which ran for almost three decades, producing several national theatre festivals each year at Rabindra Mandap, Bhubaneswar.

=== Writing and translating ===
Das translated several major Oriya works into English. Her translation of Sitakant Mahapatra's poems, Till My Time Come - Twenty Poems from SAMUDRA - Odia was released four days before she died.

== Personal life ==
Das married Bidhu Bhusan Das, and had three children, Prajna Paramita, Oopali Operajita, and Ashutosh Sheshabalaya.

== Works ==
- Prabhat Nalini Das (1969). The Captive and the Free: Essays in Criticism and Aesthetics. Lark Books.
- Bidhu Bhusan Das; Trilochan Misra; Prabhat Nalini Das (1994). Eye to Orissa. Information & Public Relations Department, Government of Orissa.

Translations

- Manoranjan Das (1993). The Wild Harvest. Translated by Prabhat Nalini Das; Jatindra Mohan Mohanty. Sahitya Akademi. ISBN 81-72014-36-8.
- Manoranjan Das (2000). Nandika Keshari: (Sarala Award Winning Play). Translated by Prabhat Nalini Das. Prachi Prakashan. ISBN 978-81-85824-12-3.
- Gopinath Mohanty (2015). Amrutara Santana - The Dynasty of The Immortals. Translated by Bidhu Bhusan Das, Prabhat Nalini Das and Oopali Operajita. Sahitya Akademi, New Delhi. ISBN 978-81-260-4746-8.
- Sitakant Mahapatra (2018). Till My Time Come (Twenty Poems from SAMUDRA - Odia). Translated by Prabhat Nalini Das. Lekhalekhi, Bhubaneswar. ISBN 978-81-931588-9-0.
