= Sarala Devi =

Indian politician

- ସରଳା ଦେବୀ
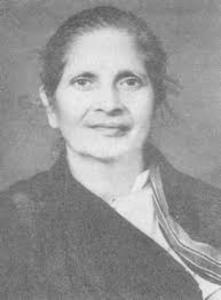
- Born: 9 August 1904; Narilo village, Orissa Division, Bengal Presidency, British India
- Died: 4 October 1986 (aged 82)
- Political party: Indian National Congress
- Spouse: Bhagirathi Mohapatra (m. 1917)
- Children: Amitav Mohapatra
- Relatives: Nityanand Kanungo (brother); Bidhu Bhusan Das (nephew)

Sarala Devi (9 August 1904 – 4 October 1986) was an Indian independence activist, feminist, social activist, politician and writer. She was the first Odia woman to join the Non-cooperation movement in 1921 and the first Odia woman delegate of the Indian National Congress. She became the first woman to be elected to the Odisha Legislative Assembly on 1 April 1936.

She was also the first female Speaker of the Odisha Legislative Assembly But only for one day and in the absence of that time speaker Mukunda Prasad Das and there are no official records present in the Odisha Legislative Assembly, the first woman Director of Cuttack Co-operative Bank, and the first female Senate member of Utkal University. She was the only representative from Odisha on President Dr S. Radhakrishnan's Education Commission.

== Early life ==
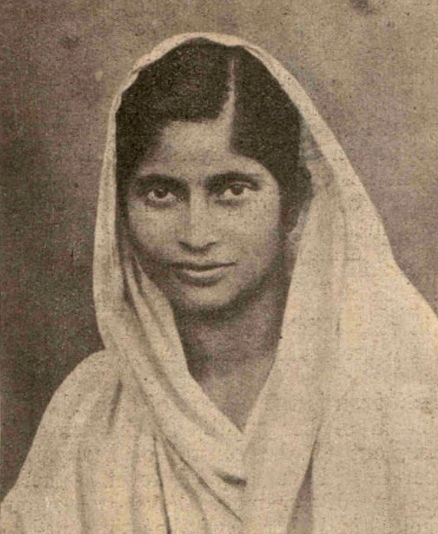
c. 1938

Sarala Devi was born on 9 August 1904 in Narilo village, near Balikuda, in what was then the Orissa Division of the Bengal Presidency (now in Jagatsinghpur district, Odisha) to a very wealthy, aristocratic Zamindar Karan family. Her father was Dewan Basudev Kanungo, and her mother was Padmavati Devi. She was adopted and raised by her father's elder brother, Balamukunda Kanungo, a Deputy Collector.

Sarala received her primary education in Banki, where her uncle was posted. Women had no access to higher education, at the time, so her uncle hired the services of a home tutor. Sarala learned Bengali, Sanskrit, Odia and basic English from her tutor. She lived with her uncle until the age of 13.

== Public life ==
While in Banki, Sarala was inspired by stories of Suka Devi, the queen of Banki, to join the independence movement. She donated a sizeable part of her large collection of jewellery and vast tracts of real estate to the fight for India's independence. She married well-known lawyer Bhagirathi Mohapatra in 1917, and the latter joined the Indian National Congress in 1918. Sarala herself joined the Congress in 1921, following Mahatma Gandhi's first visit to Orissa. She was the first woman Member of the Odisha Legislative Assembly as well as its first woman Speaker for one day.

She was very close to Mahatma Gandhi, Jawaharlal Nehru, Durgabai Deshmukh, Acharya Kripalani, Kamaladevi Chattopadhyay and Sarojini Naidu. She was the Secretary of Utkal Sahitya Samaj at Cuttack from 1943 to 1946.

== Literary works ==
Sarala wrote 30 books and 300 essays.

- Bishwa Biplabani, 1930
- Utkalaa Nari Samasya, 1934
- Narira Dabi, 1934
- Bharatiya Mahila Prasanga, 1935
- Rabindra Puja, 1935
- Beera Ramani, 1949
- Debi, Sarala (1963). Raya Ramananda (in Odia). Odisa Sahitya Ekademi. OCLC 19014670.
- Sarala Debi; Mohanty, Sachidananda; Forbes, Geraldine (2016). The Lost World of Sarala Devi : Selected Works. Oxford University Press. ISBN 978-0-19-946667-2. OCLC 992496394. Translated from Oriya.
- Sarala Debi (1935). Nari Jagata (in Odia). OCLC 1046977239.
- Sarala Debi; Rauta, Bholanatha; Acaryya, Mahendra Kumara (2017). Saraladebi Racanabali (in Odia). OCLC 1105736602.
