= Biswajit Das (playwright) =

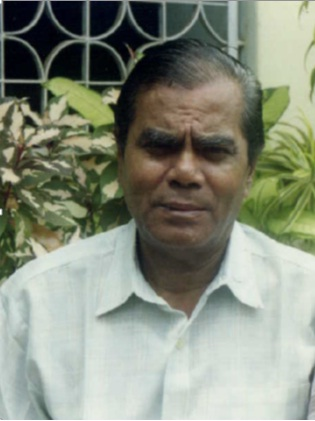
- Born: 18 August 1936
- Died: 30 December 2004 (aged 68)
- Education: Ravenshaw College, Cuttack
- Occupations: Playwright, short story writer, film director and script writer
- Spouse: Gayatri
- Children: Ananya, Samanjasa, Ipsita, Shreyasee and Subarna

Biswajit Das (18 August 1936 – 30 December 2004) was an Odia playwright, short story writer, film director and script writer.

== Early life ==
Das was born on 18 August 1936 at Jajpur, a sub-division of the Cuttack in Odisha and was the eldest of four siblings. His father, Subodh Das, a homeopathic doctor by profession, was also a freedom fighter, dramatist and actor, while his mother, Krushna Kamini Devi, was a freedom fighter. During his primary school days Das was profoundly influenced by the traditional open-air theatre form, "jatra", which he used to witness in his village. In 1946, Das was enrolled at the Peary Mohan Academy, Cuttack for his secondary education and thereafter did his graduation from the Ravenshaw College, Cuttack where his contemporaries included Sarat Pujari, Hemant Das and above all, Ananta Mahapatra, who would later on direct and act in several of his plays. Asim Basu, started an amateur dramatic troupe in 1967-68 called Roopakar Natya Group. Biswajit Das and Ananta Mahapatra joined the group and it was decided to offer something new to the audience other than just recreation or amusement. The group gave new thoughts and posed new questions to the intellectual elite that made the plays more vibrant and attractive.

== Career ==
Das started his professional career in 1958 as Public Information Officer in the Information and Public Relations Department of the Government of Odisha. Das served as Public Relations Officer of four Chief Ministers and one Governor of Odisha, including Nandini Sathpathy, Biju Patnaik and Janaki Ballabh Patnaik. He retired from service in 1994 as Additional Director, Information and Public Relations Department.

== Works and Plays ==
Biswajit Das was a powerful, experimental, contemporary Odia dramatist who authored many plays of great prominence. Post 1960 a new phase of modern Odia theatre was created by breaking the conventional style of professional theatre. The Naba Natya Andolan: (New Theater Movement) started with modern experimentation of plays inspired by Ibsen, Brecht, Freud, Bernard Shaw and Sartre. Das entered into the dramatics arena in the early fifties and was one of the pioneers of the New Theatre Movement. He started writing one-act plays in 1952. His first one act play was "Gotte Drushya" which was staged on the Janata Ranga Mancha. The play which portrayed an impoverished middle-class family's life struggle was directed by Ananta Mahapatra and both Das and Mahapatra acted in it. Biswajit Das wrote more than 60 one act plays which include Chhadmabeshi, Tandra, Dahini, Show, Banshi, Byartha Lagna, Trushna, Antara, Chief Guest, Probesh-Prasthan, Kitta, Suryastha, Shilpinka Anupasthitire and Swarga Martya.

The success of his one-act plays led Das to write his first full-fledged play, Banhi (Fire) which was adjudged the best in a competition organized by the State Government on the eve of the centenary celebrations of India's First War of Independence in 1957. At that time he was a student at Ravenshaw College, Cuttack. This encouraged him to write more. Nishipadma (Nocturnal Lotus) in 1967, Nalipana rani kalapana tika (Queen of Hearts and Ace of Spades) in 1968, and Nija pratinidhinka tharu (From Our Correspondent) in 1968, are some of his prominent plays. Though written in traditional style these were novel in presentation. In Nishipadma Das speaks about how difficult situations can bring adversaries together forcing them to shun their differences. Das' adaptation of Gogol's Inspector General in Pratapgarhe didin (Two Days in Pratapgarh) was produced on the platform of the "Srujani" Dramatics Organization in 1961-62 and received great appreciation as a powerful political satire. Suna Sujane (1971) was another highly acclaimed play.

In 1970 Das produced Mrugaya (The Hunt). This was an experimental play of a different taste, analysing artistically the agony and helplessness of hypocritical human beings. Psychoanalysis of the modern mind gave this effort a touch of reality. Das opines that craving for happiness always ends in the agony of contemporary life. In this play he has shown how darkness is the essence of life and the ever-increasing gap between what we aspire for and what we achieve.

Similarly, in Samrat (Emperor) in 1972, an adaptation of Albert Camus' Caligula, Das analyses the mental state of present-day man through the emperor's personality. Paapi and Brutte were adaptations of Bernard Shaw's Devil's Disciple and On the rock, respectively. Other prominent plays include Mahamaya Opera (1999), Om Sri Sri Prajapateya Namah, Mukha, Sei Ten Jon and Nua Janha.

Das started a dramatics centre called "Rupakar" in Bhubaneswar in 1967. The first play staged by Rupakar was Das’ "Nishipadma." Subsequently, his play "Nija pratinidhinka tharu" was also staged. Das wrote his play "Nalipana rani kalapana tika" for a competition organised by the Odisha Sangeet Natak Academy. Rupakar bagged four of the five awards given by the Academy – Best Actor, Best Actress, Best Dramatics Organisation – Rupakar and Best Director – Biswajit Das. In 1970 Rupakar was bifurcated into "Sanket" and "Uttar Purusha" with Das heading the former. Sanket's birth was heralded with the staging of Das’ most acclaimed play "Mrugaya" which he also directed.

Unlike many of his contemporaries Das was not a prolific writer, but his body of work is remarkable for its qualitative excellence. His characters are three-dimensional. He brought logic and reality into his plays and during the 1970s, when professional Odia theatre had nearly closed down and audiences had turned their back on absurdist drama, he succeeded to some extent in bringing them back to the halls mainly through emotional dialogue. This is regarded as a major contribution of Biswajit Das. He also contributed lighting techniques to the Odia stage, which was underdeveloped for long.

== Filmography ==
Biswajit Das was also an acclaimed film director. Some of his notable films are Priyatama (1978), Nijhum Ratir Sathi (1979) and Maana Abhimaan (1980). Other movies which he scripted include Ahalya, Kaberi, Naga Phasa and Gouri. Das won the Cine Critics award in 1987 and the State Government award for his contribution to Odia cinema.

Das also wrote serials for Doordarshan. These included the popular Satya and Sadhu Sabhdan. He also produced a documentary film on World Theater Day.

Das wrote a weekly column called "Bhinna Swar" (Different Tunes) in the Sambad daily newspaper, which was subsequently compiled into a collection of short stories.

=== Director ===
- Priyatama (1978)
- Nijhum Ratir Sathi (1979)
- Maana Abhimaan (1980)

=== Scriptwriter ===
- Ahalya
- Kaberi
- Naga Phasa
- Gouri

=== Serials ===
- Satya
- Sadhu Sabhdan

== Honours and awards ==
- Orissa Sangeet Parishad award (1957) for "Banhi" – Best playwright
- Orissa Sangeet Natak Akademi Award for Playwright and Direction (1982)
- Cine Critics Association award (1987)
- State Government award for contribution to Odia cinema (1989)
- Cine Critics award (1991)
- Ramachandra Mishra Memorial Award (1998)
- Satabdira Kalakar award

== Personal life ==
Das married Gayatri in 1962. Gayatri was a noted educationist and was the principal of several Government schools. They had a son, Samanjasa, and four daughters, named Ananya, Ipsita, Shreyasee and Subarna. His wife predeceased him in 2002.

== Death ==
Das died on 30 December 2004 at the age of 68.

== Gallery ==
Biswajit at his young age	Biswajit with Gayatri	Biswajit receiving award	Biswajit at his workplace
