= Journal of Infrastructure Development =

- Discipline: Development studies
- Language: English
- Edited by: Shubhashis Gangopadhyay

Publication details
- History: 2009
- Publisher: SAGE Publications (India)
- Frequency: Bi-annual

Standard abbreviations
- ISO 4: J. Infrastruct. Dev.

Indexing
- ISSN: 0974-9306 (print); 0975-5969 (web)

Links
- Journal homepage; Online access; Online archive

Journal of Infrastructure Development is a forum for discussion on infrastructure policy, given that in most developing countries, infrastructure is as much related to policy as it is to markets. JOI provides a platform for healthy trade and debate regarding new ideas in the infrastructure sector.

It is published twice a year by SAGE Publications in association with India Development Foundation.

== Abstracting and indexing ==
Journal of Infrastructure Development is abstracted and indexed in:

- Research Papers in Economics (RePEc)
- DeepDyve
- Portico
- Dutch-KB
- EBSCO
- OCLC
- J-Gate
