= TERI School of Advanced Studies =

Sustainability-focused university in Delhi, India

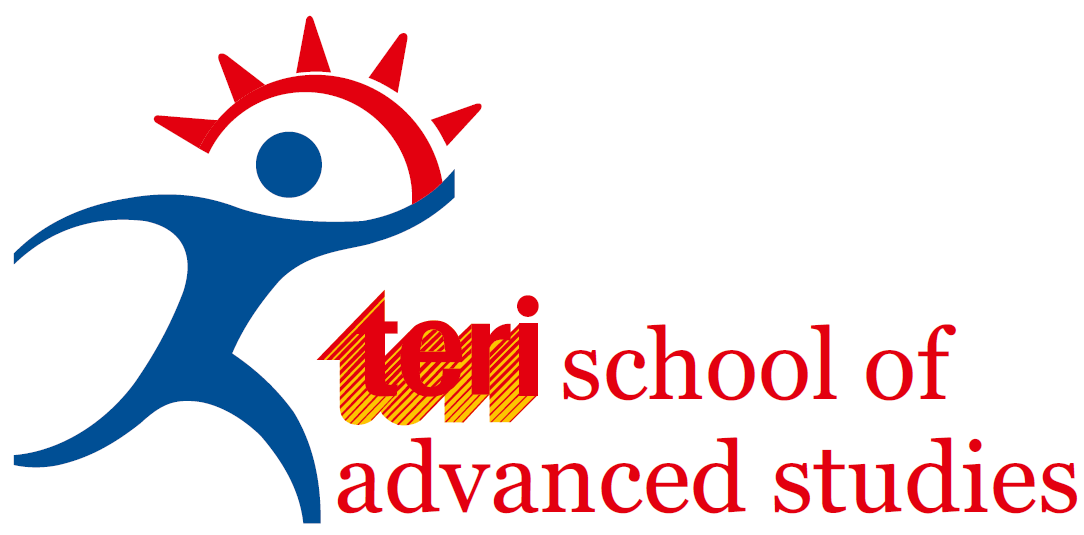
- Former name: TERI University
- Type: Education and Research Institution
- Established: 1998; 28 years ago
- Chancellor: Dr. Vibha Dhawan
- Vice-Chancellor: Suman Kumar Dhar
- Location: South West Delhi, Delhi, India
- Campus: 2 acres (0.81 ha)
- Website: www.terisas.ac.in

The TERI School of Advanced Studies (TERI SAS) is a higher education institute in South West Delhi, India which specializes in the field of sustainable development. It was established in 1998 by The Energy and Resources Institute. In 1999, the TERI School of Advanced Studies was granted the 'Deemed to be University' status by the Indian University Grants Commission.

The School started functioning from its campus, located in Vasant-Kunj, South West Delhi in 2008 and offers Masters and PhD programs. It has started work on developing a new campus at Hyderabad, Telangana in southern India.

With effect from 2023, the School has started Under-Graduate (UG) programs also including B.Sc. Data Science.

== Campus ==
The TERI School of Advanced Studies is situated at Plot No. 10, Institutional Area, in a modern green building. The campus was inaugurated by the President of India, Pratibha Devisingh Patil, on 11 September 2008. While inaugurating the green campus, the president observed that it was "an exemplary example of combining traditional values of conservation and preservation of energy while building a state of the art campus." The campus is designed as a green building. According to the institution, its design features reduce energy consumption by about 60% and potable water use by about 25%. The campus is equipped with three types of cooling systems: the Earth Air Tunnel (EAT), Variable Refrigerant Volume System (VRV) and Thermal Mass Storage (TMS). The Earth Air Tunnel used in the hostel block uses the heat-sink property of the earth to regulate indoor temperatures, reportedly reducing energy use by up to 50% compared with conventional systems.

Before moving into the Vasant Kunj campus, the university was housed in the Darbari Seth block of India Habitat Centre from 1998 to 2008.

== Centers and departments ==
TERI SAS comprises the Department of Natural and Applied Sciences, the Department of Policy and Management Studies, the Department of Sustainable Engineering, the Department of Biotechnology, the Coca-Cola Department of Regional Water Studies, and the Centre for Postgraduate Legal Studies. Its research centers include the IPCA Centre for World Spheres Management Research and the Emerson Centre of Excellence for Sustainability Studies.

== Academic programs ==
TERI SAS offers undergraduate, integrated, postgraduate, doctoral and certificate programs in areas related to sustainable development.

=== Undergraduate and integrated programs ===
The school offers four-year undergraduate programs (B.Sc. Honors / Honors with Research) and five-year integrated postgraduate programs (B.Sc.–M.Sc.) in:

- Energy and Computer Applications
- Environmental Studies
- Data Science
- Economics
- Biotechnology

It also offers a four-year B.B.A. program in Business Administration.

=== Master's programs ===
Two-year master's programs include:

- M.Tech. (Renewable Energy Engineering and Management)
- M.B.A. (Sustainability Management)
- M.Sc. (Energy Studies and Management)
- M.Sc. (Biotechnology – Plant / Microbial)
- M.Sc. (Climate Science and Policy)
- M.Sc. (Economics)
- M.Sc. (Environmental Studies and Resource Management)
- M.Sc. (Geoinformatics)
- M.A. (Public Policy and Sustainable Development)
- M.A. (Sustainable Development Practice)

A one-year LLM in Environment and Natural Resources Law / Infrastructure and Business Law is also offered.

=== Doctoral programs ===
TERI SAS offers Ph.D. programs across thematic areas including bioresources and biotechnology, business sustainability, energy and environment, natural resources management, policy studies, water science and governance, and legal studies.

=== Certificate programs ===
The school offers a six-month online certificate program in Renewable Energy Technology, Policy and Management.

== Administration ==
Prof. Suman Kumar Dhar is the Vice-Chancellor of TERI SAS.

== Events ==
Retopia is the annual cultural and technological festival of Department of Energy and Environment at TERI School of Advanced Studies, South West Delhi. The festival brings together participants from government, academia and industry to discuss clean energy issues.

The 12th Convocation of TERI School of Advanced Studies (TERI SAS) was held on 14 November 2019. Dr Krishnaswamy Kasturirangan, one of the most recognized scientists of the country was the Chief Guest and delivered the Convocation address. Dr Shailesh Nayak, the Chancellor, TERI SAS presided over the convocation. A total of 19 doctoral and 229 master's degrees were awarded.

== TERI School of Advanced Studies partnerships ==
TERI School of Advanced Studies signed a memorandum of understanding (MoU) with several institutions with the aim of facilitating a mutually beneficial exchange of students, faculty, knowledge, resources, and ideas. In February 2002, TERI School of Advanced Studies entered into a memorandum of understanding with the School of Forestry and Environmental Studies of Yale University. In February 2003, TERI School of Advanced Studies signed a MoU with Donald Danforth Plant Science Center, USA. In April 2005, the University entered into a MoU with the University of Nottingham, UK. In September 2007, TERI School of Advanced Studies signed a MoU with Michigan State University, USA. In November 2007, TERI School of Advanced Studies signed a MoU with University of New South Wales, Australia. In 2007 itself TERI School of Advanced Studies signed an agreement of cooperation with Freie University Berlin, Germany. In February 2008, TERI School of Advanced Studies signed MoUs with University of Iceland, Iceland and North Carolina State University, USA. TERI School of Advanced Studies signed Mevlana staff and student exchange agreement with Akdeniz University from Antalya-Turkey in 2018.

The UNESCO Chair on Climate Science and Policy has been established in TERI School of Advanced Studies. Under this chair, the MSc in climate science and policy has been initiated with support from UNESCO.

== E-learning initiatives ==
TERI School of Advanced Studies is a part of the Promotion of Sustainability in Postgraduate Education and Research initiative of the UNU - Institute of Advanced Studies (UNU-IAS) This is essentially a network of several leading higher education institutions in Asia and the Pacific that have committed to work together to integrate sustainable development into postgraduate courses and curricula. As a part of this initiative, a postgraduate program on public policy and sustainable development has been started in TERI School of Advanced Studies.

The MacArthur Foundation awarded TERI SAS a grant of US$900,000 to establish a master's program in Development Practice, as one of several universities supported under the foundation's global Master's in Development Practice initiative.

== TERI School of Advanced Studies newsletter ==
The TERI School of Advanced Studies has a newsletter called Offprint. The department of business sustainability has a newsletter named Connect, which has the theme of sustainability and infrastructure issues in India.

== See also ==
- The Energy and Resources Institute
- GRIHA
- Gopal Krishna Sarangi
- Sustainable development
