= Nityanand Kanungo =

Indian politician (1900–1988)

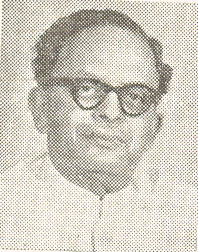

6th Governor of Bihar
- In office 7 December 1967 – 20 January 1971
- Chief Minister: Mahamaya Prasad Sinha; Satish Prasad Singh; B. P. Mandal; Bhola Paswan Shastri; Harihar Singh; Daroga Prasad Rai; Karpoori Thakur
- Preceded by: M. A. S. Ayyangar
- Succeeded by: U.N. Sinha (Acting)

2nd Governor of Gujarat
- In office 1 August 1965 – 6 December 1967
- Chief Minister: Balwantrai Mehta; Hitendra Kanaiyalal Desai
- Preceded by: Mehdi Nawaz Jung
- Succeeded by: P. N. Bhagwati (Acting)

Member of Parliament, Lok Sabha
- In office 1952–1957
- Succeeded by: Surendranath Dwivedy
- Constituency: Kendrapara
- In office 1962–1967
- Succeeded by: Srinibas Mishra
- Constituency: Cuttack

3rd Minister of Industry
- In office 1955–1957
- Prime Minister: Jawaharlal Nehru

Minister of Commerce, Govt of India
- In office 1957–1962

Personal details
- Born: 4 May 1900 Cuttack, British India
- Died: 2 August 1988 (aged 88)
- Party: Indian National Congress
- Relatives: Sarala Devi (sister); Bhagirathi Mahapatra (brother in law)
- Occupation: Politician

Nityanand Kanungo (4 May 1900 – 2 August 1988) was one of India's prominent politicians from the state of Odisha, who held successive high-profile portfolios in Prime Minister Jawaharlal Nehru's cabinet.

== Early life ==
Nityanand Kanungo was born in Cuttack on 4 May 1900 in an aristocratic Zamindar Karan family and was educated at Ravenshaw College and University College (Calcutta). His father was Dewan Basudev Kanungo, and his mother was Padmavati Devi. His sister Sarala Devi was the first Odia woman to join the Non-cooperation movement in 1921 and the first woman to be elected to the Odisha Legislative Assembly.

== Public life ==
He was a member of the Indian National Congress and served as a member of the Orissa Legislative Assembly from 1937 to 1939 and again from 1946 to 1952.

When Orissa was granted provincial autonomy as per the Government of India Act 1935, Kanungo served as the Minister for Revenue and Public Works Departments in the cabinet of Bishwanath Das from 1937 to 1939. He was again appointed a Minister in 1946 and served till 1952, looking after the Home, Law, Industries and Agriculture portfolios.

In 1952, Kanungo was elected to the Lok Sabha from the Kendrapara constituency. In September, 1954 he was appointed Union Deputy Minister of Commerce and Industry. From August 1955 in Prime Minister Jawaharlal Nehru's cabinet; he was Union Minister of Industries, and in June 1956 was designated Union Minister of Consumer Industries. In 1957, he was again returned to the Lok Sabha and was appointed Union Minister of Commerce. Kanungo was a member of the Indian Delegation to the International Labour Conference in San Francisco (1948) and was the Leader of the Delegation to the Conference of the International Rice Commission held in Jakarta in 1952.

In the 1962 Indian general election, Kanungo was elected to the Lok Sabha from the Cuttack constituency. He was Union Minister for Commerce and Industries, in the Nehru cabinet, and after the bifurcation of that portfolio, Union Minister, in turn, for Commerce and later for Industry. He finished up as Union Minister for Civil Aviation.

Kanungo served as the Governor of Gujarat from 1 August 1965 to 6 December 1967. He was the Governor of Bihar from 7 December 1967 to 20 January 1971.

== See also ==
- List of governors of Bihar
