= Atanu Kumar Pati =

Indian zoologist

Atanu Kumar Pati is an Indian zoologist, served as the Vice-Chancellor Gangadhar Meher University (GMU), Sambalpur, Odisha from 2017 till 2020.

== Early life and education ==
Pati did his B.Sc. from Utkal University and M.Sc. (1977) and Ph.D. (1982) in Zoology from Banaras Hindu University. He has also received the UGC Research Award in 2002. He has also been elected as Fellow of the National Academy of Sciences, India (FNASc) in 2003. He presided the Indian Society for Chronobiology as its president from 2008 till 2017. He served the International Society of Subterranean Biology [Société Internationale de Biospéologie] as its Council Member, from 2004 to 2010. He is also Professor, Head, Dean, School of Life Sciences Pandit Ravishankar Shukla University (on lien).

== Career ==
BSc (1975) - Utkal University; MSc (1977) - Banaras Hindu University; PhD (1982) - Banaras Hindu University; Cours de Chronobiologie (1986) - L’Université V, Paris. Post-doctoral research at Hospital Paul Brousse, Villejuif (L’Université V, Paris). Faculty — School of Life Sciences - (1983- Present). Council Member, World Federation of Societies of Chronobiology, 2002–2006. Recipient of UGC Research Award, 2002. Fellow of the National Academy of Sciences (FNASc), India, 2003. Council Member, International Society of Subterranean Biology, 2004–2010. Member, International Scientific Board, 1st, 2nd, 3rd International Congress of Applied Chronobiology and Chronomedicine. Editor-in-Chief, Newsletter, Indian Society for Chronobiology, 1995–1997, 2000–2009. Editor-in-Chief, Journal of Ravishankar University, Part B (Science) from 2009–present. President, Indian Society for Chronobiology, from 2009–present.

== Research work ==
The main focus of his research involves study of circadian clocks in shift workers, cancer patients and cave fish. In addition, he studies cognitive abilities, with reference to short interval judgment, in human subjects. He also studied cognitive abilities involving case construction behavior in a species of bagworm moth. He demonstrated alteration in temporal organization in human subjects, who carry out rotational shift duties. He reported disruption of circadian rhythm in cognitive judgment of short-time intervals in shift workers. He proposed a model for optimization of human shift work. He reported that shift work might reduce human longevity. He reported disruption of circadian clock in cancer patients and suggested implementation of patient-specific chronotherapeutic protocol. He demonstrated functional circadian oscillators in cave fish and reinterpreted findings of others to rule out the hypothesis of clock regression in hypogean fish. He reported rhythmic pattern in case architecture of bagworm moth. He proposed a model illustrating the ability of this moth to process thorn length and distance signals hierarchically during case construction through toggling its preference between thorns and cut-twigs

== Representative publications ==
- Pati AK (2008). Circadian rhythms in hypogean fish: with special reference to the cave loach, Nemacheilus evezardi. In: Fish Life in Special Environments, P. Sébert, D.W. Onyango and B.G. Kapoor (eds.), pp. 83–130. Science Publishers, New Hampshire, USA.
- Pati AK, Parganiha A, Kar A, Soni R, Roy S and Choudhary V (2007). Alterations of the characteristics of the circadian rest-activity rhythm of cancer in-patients. Chronobiol. Int. 24, 1179–1197.
- Pati AK and Parganiha A (2005). Shift work: Circadian rhythm disruption and beyond. Proc. Indian Natn. Sci. Acad. (PINSA) B71, 229-255. Pati AK and Agrawal A (2000). Hierarchical perception of stimuli during case construction in the bagworm moth Eumeta crameri. J. Insect Behavior 13, 667–677.
- Pati AK, Florentin I, Chung V, De Sousa M, Lévi F and Mathé G (1987). Circannual rhythm in natural killer cell activity and mitogen responsiveness of murine splenocytes. Cellular Immunology 108, 227–234.
- Atanu Kumar Pati, Arti Chandrawanshi and Alain Reinberg (2001) Shift work: Consequences and management
