= List of Odia-language authors =

This is a list of Odia language authors.

== A ==
- Santanu Kumar Acharya
- Achyutananda
- Akshaya Mohanty

== B ==
- Shakuntala Baliarsingh
- Upendra Bhanja
- Bhima Bhoi
- Birendra Kumar Bhuyan

== C ==
- Mrinal Chatterjee

== D ==
- Jagannath Prasad Das
- Manoj Das
- Manoranjan Das
- Sarala Das

== F ==
- Faturananda

== K ==
- Krushna Chandra Kar

== M ==
- Bhupen Mahapatra
- Gokulananda Mahapatra
- Sitakant Mahapatra
- Harekrushna Mahatab
- Mayadhar Mansingh
- Baidyanath Misra
- Tarun Kanti Mishra
- Artaballabha Mohanty
- Akshaya Mohanty
- Durga Charan Mohanty
- Gopinath Mohanty
- Jagadish Mohanty
- Kanhu Charan Mohanty
- Surendra Mohanty
- Kumudini Mohapatra

== N ==
- Nanda Kishore Bal

== P ==
- Kalindi Charan Panigrahi
- Krishna Chandra Panigrahi
- Nikhilanand Panigrahy
- Ramesh Chandra Parida
- Bibhuti Patnaik
- Manasi Pradhan
- Tapan Kumar Pradhan
- Gopala Chandra Praharaj
- Pyarimohan Acharya

== R ==
- Gopal Rath
- Brajanath Ratha
- Annada Shankar Ray
- Pratibha Ray
- Sachidananda Routray

== S ==
- Mohapatra Nilamani Sahoo
- Sarojini Sahoo
- Laxminarayan Sahu
- Natabar Samantaray
- Nandini Satpathy
- Fakir Mohan Senapati
- Amos Sutton
- Puripanda Appala Swamy

== U ==
- Srinibash Udgata

== See also ==
- Odia literature
- Odia language
