= List of recipients of the Odisha Sahitya Akademi Award =

Odia-language literary award

Odisha Sahitya Akademi Award
- Award for contributions to Odia literature
- Awarded for: Literary award in Odisha, India
- Sponsored by: Odisha Sahitya Akademi
- First award: 1957-58
- Final award: 2016
- Website: Odisha Sahitya Akademi

Odisha Sahitya Akademi Award is a literary award awarded to an Odia language litterateur for outstanding contribution to Odia literature in various categories by the Odisha Sahitya Akademi, an institution established in 1957 in Odisha for active promotion of Odia language and literature.

== Awards ==
=== 1957 and 1958 ===
Awarded Books Published in 1957 and 1958
#	Book	Author	Category of Books
1	Dilip	Upendra Mohanty	Verses–Poems
2	Swarna Jugara Sandhya	Jnanindra Barma	Plays–One Act Plays
3	Agni Parikshya	Bhanja Kishore Patnaik	Plays–One Act Plays
4	Byasa Kabi Fakir Mohan	Natabara Samantaray	Criticism
5	Veda Manusyakruta ki?	Priyabrata Das	Criticism
6	Godan	Golok Bihari Dhal	Translations
7	Ezra Pound Kabita	Jnanindra Barma	Translations

=== 1956, 1957 and 1958 ===
Awarded Books Published in 1956, 1957 and 1958
#	Book	Author	Category of Books
8	Sabuja Patra O Dhusar Golapa	Surendra Mohanty	Short Story
9	Chora Chaitali	Rajeswari Dalbehera	Short Story
10	Kanta O Phula	Godabarish Mohapatra	Verses–Poems
11	Sanchyan	Bidyut Prabha Devi	Verses–Poems
12	Bhagwan Sankaracharya	Durga Charan Mohanty	Biography–Travelogue
13	Jatiya Jibanara Atmabikasa	Gobinda Chandra Mishra	Biography–Travelogue
14	Odissi Chitra	Binod Routray	Scientific literature
15	Puspa Chasa	Biswanath Sahoo	Scientific literature
16	Kalinga Kahani	Kanak Manjari Mohapatra	Children's literature
17	Pilanka Kathalahari	Chandra Sekhar Mohapatra	Children's literature
18	Europere Mo Anubhuti	Sriram Chandra Dash	Travelogue

=== 1959, 1960 and 1961 ===
Awarded Books Published in 1959, 1960 and 1961
#	Book	Author	Category of Books
19	Aaranyaka	Manoj Das	Novel–Short Stories
20	Utha Kankala	Godabarish Mohapatra	Verses–Poems
21	Paschima Diganta	Sriharsh Mishra	Travelogue
22	E Jugara Srestha Abiskara	Gokulananda Mohapatra	Scientific literature
23	Jibana Bidyalaya	Chittaranjan Das	Essays
24	Jugaprabarttaka Srasta Radhanatha	Natabara Samantaray	Criticism
25	Kabi Samrat Upendra Bhanja	Ananta Padmanabha Patnaik	Criticism
26	Charama Patra	Rabindranath Singh	Verses–Poems

=== 1962, 1963 and 1964 ===
Awarded Books Published in 1962, 1963 and 1964
#	Book	Author	Category of Books
27	Nara Kinnara	Santanu Kumar Acharya	Novel
28	Adi Manabara Itibrutta	Kamal Lochan Baral	Short Story
29	Satyabhama	Golak Chandra Pradhan	Verses–Poems
30	Chhota Nataka	Manoranjan Das	Plays–One Act Plays
31	Odia Sahityara Itihasa	Suryanarayan Dash	Essays–Criticism
32	Balloon Gala Udi	Maheswar Mohanty	Children's literature

=== 1965, 1966 and 1967 ===
Awarded Books Published in 1965, 1966 and 1967
#	Book	Author	Category of Books
33	Anti-Romantic	Basant Kumar Satpathy	Short Story
34	Pingalara Surjya	Benudhar Rout	Verses–Poems
35	Mora Purba Smrutikatha	Bharat Chandra Nayak	Biography- Travelogue
36	Bharatiya Sangeeta	Nilamadhab Panigrahi	Scientific literature

=== 1966, 1967 and 1968 ===
Awarded Books Published in 1966, 1967 and 1968
#	Book	Author	Category of Books
37	Kasturi Mruga O Sabuja Aranya	Binapani Mohanty	Short Story
38	Astapadi	Sitakant Mahapatra	Verses-Poems
39	Americaru Europe Africa	Kunja Bihari Das	Travelogue
40	Aluara Kuhuka O Sabdara Luchakali	Jagannath Mohanty	Children's literature

=== 1969, 1970, 1971, 1972 and 1973 ===
Awarded Books Published in 1969, 1970, 1971, 1972 and 1973
#	Book	Author	Category of Books
41	Manihara	Kishori Charan Das	Short Story
42	Tinoti Apera Ekatra	Gopal Chhotray	Plays–One Act Plays
43	Enuscha Tenuscha	Bama Charan Mitra	Essays
44	Kuntala Kumari Jibana Charita	Chakradhara Mohapatra	Biography -Travelogue
45	Odia Bhasatatwara Bhumika	Bansidhara Mohanty	Criticism

=== 1973, 1974 and 1975 ===
Awarded Books Published in 1973, 1974 and 1975. Awarded in 1976
#	Book	Author	Category of Books
46	Nisiddha Pustaka	Chaudhury Hemkant Mishra	Short Story
47	Trutiya Chakshu	Chintamani Behera	Verses–Poems
48	Athaba Andhara	Jadunath Das Mohapatra	Plays–One Act Plays
49	Kabya Sambada	Dasarathi Das	Criticism
50	Mo Kuni Kuni Kabita	Bata Krushna Ojha	Children's literature

=== 1974, 1975 and 1976 ===
Awarded Books Published in 1974, 1975 and 1976. Awarded in 1977
#	Book	Author	Category of Books
51	Asurjya Upanibesha	Chandrasekhar Rath	Novel
52	Samanya Kathana	Sourindranath Barik	Verses–Poems
53	Ratira Duiti Dena	Harihar Mishra	Plays–One Act Plays
54	Kalankita Surjya	Ratnakar Chaini	Plays–One Act Plays
55	Suna Parikhya	Bhubaneswar Behera	Essays–Criticism
56	Jhumuka	Ramakrushna Nanda	Children's literature

=== 1975, 1976 and 1977 ===
Awarded Books Published in 1975, 1976 and 1977. Awarded in 1978
#	Book	Author	Category of Books
57	Akasha Patala	Mohapatra Nilamani Sahoo	Short Story
58	Brutta	Deepak Mishra	Verses–Poems
59	Jadukara	Bijay Mishra	Plays–One Act Plays
60	Asruta Swara	Chandrasekhar Rath	Essays–Criticism
61	Hara Bhainka Ghara Bahuda	Udayanath Sarangi	Children's literature

=== 1976, 1977 and 1978 ===
Awarded Books Published in 1976, 1977 and 1978. Awarded in 1979
#	Book	Author	Category of Books
62	Nija Singhasana	Prafulla Kumar Tripathy	Short Story
63	Andha Mahumachhi	Soubhagya Kumar Misra	Verses–Poems
64	Bisanna Pruthibi	Rabindra Nath Das	Plays–One Act Plays
65	Odia Prabandha Sahityara Itihasa	Asit Kabi	Essays–Criticism
66	Mo Samayara Odisha	Krishna Chandra Panigrahi	Biography–Travelogue
67	Nali Suruja Bune Muruja	Pramila Nayak	Children's literature

=== 1977, 1978 and 1979 ===
Awarded Books Published in 1977, 1978 and 1979. Awarded in 1980
#	Book	Author	Category of Books
68	Mo Swapnara Sahara	Laxmidhar Nayak	Novel
69	Srotara Nama Ruta	Kamalakanta Lenka	Verses–Poems
70	Alankara Prasanga	Gobinda Chandra Udgata	Essays–Criticism
71	Snayu Sanghara	Pranabandhu Kar	Plays–One Act Plays
72	Na'hang Tisthami Baikunthe	Nityananda Mahapatra	Biography–Travelogue
73	Chhatiki Pathara Kari	Binod Kanungo	Children's literature

=== 1978, 1979 and 1980 ===
Awarded Books Published in 1978, 1979 and 1980. Awarded in 1981
#	Book	Author	Category of Books
74	Nishanta	Bibhuti Bhusan Tripathy	Short Story–Novel
75	Je Jahara Nirjanata	Jagannath Prasad Das	Verses–Poems
76	Nihsang Manisha	Sitakant Mahapatra	Essays–Criticism
77	Dharmara Abhisapa	Anand Sankar Das	Plays–One Act Plays
78	Satabdira Awahana	Debakanta Mishra	Scientific literature
79	Ama Khelana	Nikunja Kishore Kanungo	Children's literature

=== 1979, 1980 and 1981 ===
Awarded Books Published in 1979, 1980 and 1981. Awarded in 1982
#	Book	Author	Category of Books
80	Nisadara Nihsabda Barana	Durgamadhab Mishra	Short Story
81	Nihsabda Nupura	Umasankar Panda	Poems
82	Hata Bazarare Brahmagyana	Manmohan Choudhury	Essays–Criticism
83	Nataka Ritimata	Ram Chandra Mishra	Plays–One Act Plays
84	Gandhi Maharajanka Sishya	Uday Nath Sadangi	Biography–Travelogue
85	Gapa Ganthili	Ramesh Chandra Bhanja	Children's literature

=== 1980, 1981 and 1982 ===
Awarded Books Published in 1980, 1981 and 1982. Awarded in 1983
#	Book	Author	Category of Books
86	Snayu O Sanyasi	Achyutananda Pati	Short Story
87	Drustira Dyuti	Brahmotri Mohanty	Verses–Poems
88	Greek Jatira Jibana Gatha	Sarat Kumar Mohanty	Essays–Criticism
89	Ekankika Taranga	Kamal Lochan Mohanty	Plays–One Act Plays
90	Mo Jibana O Janjala Kahani	Nanda Kishore Das	Biography–Travelogue
91	Bilatare Bapu O Papu	Ganeswar Mishra	Children's literature

=== 1981, 1982 and 1983 ===
Awarded Books Published in 1981, 1982 and 1983. Awarded in 1984
#	Book	Author	Category of Books
92	Sapta Sindhu (Part -I & II)	Nrusingha Charan Panda	Novel
93	Hiranyagarbha	Rabi Patnaik	Short Story
94	Manara Manachitra	Brajanath Ratha	Verses–Poems
95	Baldeba Ratha Adhyayana	Sachidanand Mishra	Essays–Criticism
96	Mahanataka	Ramesh Chandra Panigrahi	Plays–One Act Plays
97	Runa Parisodha	Binod Kanungo	Biography–Travelogue
98	Bana Raijara Katha	Manorama Mohapatra	Children's literature

=== 1982, 1983 and 1984 ===
Awarded Books Published in 1982, 1983 and 1984. Awarded in 1985
#	Book	Author	Category of Books
99	Aswamedhara Ghoda	Bibhuti Patnaik	Novel
100	Chitrita Chadara	Krushna Prasad Mishra	Short Story
101	Barnaraga	Nirmala Devi	Verses–Poems
102	Nihsanga Bisarga	Kartik Chandra Rath	Plays–One Act Plays
103	Samalochanara Digadiganta	Khageswar Mohapatra	Essays–Criticism
104	Kaladrusti	Chintamani Behera	Essays–Criticism
105	Jibana Pathe	Ramadevi Choudhury	Biography–Travelogue
106	Emiti Thile Ama Bapuji	Gayatri Mishra	Children's literature

=== 1983, 1984 and 1985 ===
Awarded Books Published in 1983, 1984 and 1985. Awarded in 1986
#	Book	Author	Category of Books
107	Shilapadma	Pratibha Ray	Novel
108	Nisha	Purnananda Dani	Short Story
109	Nimishe Akhyara	Pratibha Satpathy	Verses–Poems
110	Cactusra Soliloquy	Dasarathi Mund	Plays–One Act Plays
111	Bidagdha Kabi Abhimanyu	Kanhu Charan Mishra	Essays–Criticism
112	Bairagya Sataka	Janaki Ballabh Patnaik	Translation
113	Dura Diganta	Jagannath Mohanty	Biography–Travelogue
114	Mana Hue Mora Hebaku Mina	Kshirod Chandra Pothal	Children's literature

=== 1984, 1985 and 1986 ===
Awarded Books Published in 1984, 1985 and 1986. Awarded in 1987
#	Book	Author	Category of Books
115	Asaanta Aranya	Satakadi Hota	Novel
116	Bohubohuka	Uma Sankar Mishra	Short Story
117	Ekatra Chandra Surjya	Mamata Dash	Verses–Poems
118	Dekha, Barsa Asuchhi	Ratiranjan Mishra	Plays–One Act Plays
119	Kete Diganta (Part - I & II)	Manoj Das	Essays–Criticism
120	Patha O Pruthibi	Surendra Mohanty	Biography–Travelogue
121	Kuna Pain Ana Bana Gita	Dash Benhur	Children's literature
122	Malaydutam	Prabodh Kumar Mishra	Sanskrit literature

=== 1985, 1986 and 1987 ===
Awarded Books Published in 1985, 1986 and 1987. Awarded in 1988
#	Book	Author	Category of Books
123	Aji Kali Pa'aradina	Rajendra Prasad Das	Novel
124	Nachiketara Hata	Uttam Kumar Pradhan	Short Story
125	Dhaanasaunta Jhia	Hrusikesh Mallick	Verses–Poems
126	Janasebaka	Prasanna Kumar Mishra	Plays–One Act Plays
127	Matrupuja Mandapa	Sadasiba Mishra	Essays–Criticism
128	Smruti O Anubhuti	Nilamani Routray	Biographies–Travelogue
129	Bhuin Tale Tale	Durga Prasad Patnaik	Children's literature
130	Jagannathastottarashatakam	Sudarshan Acharya	Sanskrit literature

=== 1986, 1987 and 1988 ===
Awarded Books Published in 1986, 1987 and 1988. Awarded in 1989
#	Book	Author	Category of Books
131	Banhi Balaya	Madan Mohan Mishra	Novel
132	Manwantarara Manaba	Rajkishore Ray	Short Story
133	Anantsayana	Shakuntala Devi	Verses–Poems
134	Ei Je Surjya Uein	Bijay Kumar Satpathy	Plays–One Act Plays
135	Raktatirtha Erama	Jagannath Patnaik	Essays–Criticism
136	Karagarara Kahani	Surendranath Dwivedy	Biography–Travelogue
137	Gapudi O Pakudi	Nadiya Bihari Mohanty	Children's literature
138	Surendra Rachita Mahakavyam	Digambar Mohapatra	Sanskrit literature

=== 1987, 1988 and 1989 ===
Awarded Books Published in 1987, 1988 and 1989. Awarded in 1990
#	Book	Author	Category of Books
139	Kaniska Kaniska	Jagadish Mohanty	Novel
140	Janharati	Yashodhara Mishra	Short Story
141	Ipsita Krodha	Asutosh Parida	Verses–Poems
142	Samudra Manthana	Gopal Chandra Patnaik	Plays–One Act Plays
143	Ho Bhagate	Subodh Patnaik	Plays–One Act Plays
144	Sri Jagannatha Tattwa	Gopinath Mohapatra	Essays–Criticism
145	Patalapurira Haalchaal	Guru Prasad Mohanty	Biography–Travelogue
146	Rajara Swapna	Birendra Kumar Samantaray	Children's literature
147	Rutam	Keshab Chandra Dash	Sanskrit literature

=== 1988, 1989 and 1990 ===
Awarded Books Published in 1988, 1989 and 1990. Awarded in 1991
#	Book	Author	Category of Books
148	Durga Patanara Bela	Padmaja Pal	Novel
149	Debadasi	Bijayini Das	Novel
150	Prachakhyu	Bijay Krushna Mohanty	Short Story
151	Sabaricharjya	Bansidhar Sarangi	Verses–Poems
152	Bhora Akasha	Nityanand Nayak	Verses–Poems
153	Asra Khoji Buluthiba Iswara	Narayan Sahoo	Plays–One Act Plays
154	Bhinna Samaya Bhinna Drusti	Niladri Bhusan Harichandan	Essays–Criticism
155	Sanskruta Sahityara Itihasa	Harekrushna Satpathy	Essays–Criticism
156	Mo Swapna Mo Jibana	Radhanath Rath	Biography–Travelogue
157	Bajare Baja	Ram Prasad Mohanty	Children's literature
158	Abhinaba Kabitabali	Narayan Rath	Sanskrit literature

=== 1989, 1990 and 1991 ===
Awarded Books Published in 1989, 1990 and 1991. Awarded in 1992
#	Book	Author	Category of Books
159	Akasha Jeunthi Katha Kahe	Susmita Bagchi	Short Story
160	Dekhahele Kahibi Se Katha	Prasanna Kumar Patasani	Verses–Poems
161	Nayaka Chandrasena	Kunja Ray	Plays–One Act Plays
162	Jainadharma O Sanskruti	Ashok Kumar Rath	Essays–Criticism
163	Buddhacharitam	Dhaneswar Mohapatra	Translations
164	Mote Jete Dasa Barasa	Nanda Kishore Samal	Children's literature
165	Tarunyashatakam	Kshirod Chandra Dash	Sanskrit literature

=== 1990, 1991 and 1992 ===
Awarded Books Published in 1990, 1991 and 1992. Awarded in 1993
#	Book	Author	Category of Books
166	Abhinayara Paridhi	Ramachandra Behera	Novel
167	Amruta Pratikhyare	Sarojini Sahoo	Short Story
168	Mantrapatha	Haraprasad Das	Verses–Poems
169	Dunia	Hemanta Kumar Das	Plays–One Act Plays
170	Ritikabyara Samparkare	Gangadhara Bal	Essays–Criticism
171	Digapahandira Drawingmastre	Dinanath Pathy	Biography–Travelogue

=== 1991, 1992 and 1993 ===
Awarded Books Published in 1991, 1992 and 1993. Awarded in 1994
#	Book	Author	Category of Books
172	Saharara Upakanthe	Bipin Bihari Mishra	Novel
173	Gan Gan Aaha Aaha	Debaraj Lenka	Short Story
174	Jajati	Sarat Chandra Pradhan	Verses–Poems
175	Suniba Heu E Kahani	Shankar Prasad Tripathy	Plays–One Act Plays
176	Biswa O Byakti	Shatrugna Nath	Essays–Criticism
177	Astaraga	Shraddhakar Supakar	Biography–Travelogue
178	Aame Sabu Eka	Sarala Patri	Children's literature

=== 1992, 1993 and 1994 ===
Awarded Books Published in 1992, 1993 and 1994. Awarded in 1995
#	Book	Author	Category of Books
179	Charaibeti	Balaram Patnaik	Novel
180	Prodha Bhabana	Hrusikesh Panda	Short Story
181	Bishada Joga	Phani Mohanty	Verses–Poems
182	Guest House	Banabihari Panda	Plays–One Act Plays
183	Puratana Kalingara Samajika Itibrutti	Benimadhab Padhi	Essays–Criticism
184	Jibanara Daka	Alekha Prasad Das	Biography–Travelogue
185	Odia Ramacharita Manasa	Satyanarayan Mohanty	Translations
186	Lipira Computer Sikhya	Ramesh Chandra Parida	Children's literature

=== 1993, 1994 and 1995 ===
Awarded Books Published in 1993, 1994 and 1995. Awarded in 1996
#	Book	Author	Category of Books
187	Nistabadha Kolahala	Manasi Das	Novel
188	Shabda Khela	Jayanti Rath	Short Story
189	Chandana Banare Eka	Bhanuji Rao	Verses–Poems
190	Semananka Akhire	Chandrasekhar Nanda	Plays–One Act Plays
191	Adhunika Sabhyatara Jantrana	Baidyanath Misra	Essays–Criticism
192	Shatabdi Sadhaka	Pramod Kumar Mohapatra	Biography–Travelogue
193	Kannada Laghukatha	Keshab Chandra Meher	Translations
194	Thukuluthukula Tha	Birendranath Mohanty	Children's literature

=== 1994, 1995 and 1996 ===
Awarded Books Published in 1994, 1995 and 1996. Awarded in 1997
#	Book	Author	Category of Books
195	Manthara	Surendranath Satapathy	Novel
196	Bitangsha	Tarun Kanti Mishra	Short Story
197	Jhadara Akasha	Ranjita Nayak	Verses–Poems
198	Pratibimba	Panchanan Patra	Plays–One Act Plays
199	Srushtira Jataka O Jibana Ghadi	Sahadeva Sahoo	Essays–Criticism
200	Anirbana	Padma Charana Nayak	Biography–Travelogue
201	Pruthibira Adibasi Loka Kabita	Brahmananda Das	Translations
202	Janaganamana	Jugal Kishore Dutta	Translations
203	Pilanka Nataka Banabhoji	Krushna Chandra Patnaik	Children's literature

=== 1995, 1996 and 1997 ===
Awarded Books Published in 1995, 1996 and 1997. Awarded in 1998
#	Book	Author	Category of Books
204	Chhinnaraga	Anadi Sahu	Novel
205	Anyasrotara Galpa	Bijaya Prasad Mohapatra	Short Story
206	Ghum Pahadara Nai	Pradeep Dash	Short Story
207	Suduraru Aneka Dura	Dillip Das	Verses–Poems
208	Pratikhyare Parikhita	Anand Chandra Pahi	Plays–One Act Plays
209	Prasanga: Nataka–Ekakinka	Krishna Charan Behera	Essays–Criticism
210	Phashi Manchare Biplabi	Prafulla Das	Biography–Travelogue
211	Jayakantanka Katha O Kahani	Narayan Pruseth	Translations
212	Semane Pherigale	Sankarsan Samal	Children's literature

=== 1996, 1997 and 1998 ===
Awarded Books Published in 1996, 1997 and 1998. Awarded in 1999
#	Book	Author	Category of Books
213	Purbapara	Naru Mohanty	Novel
214	Panjuri O Anyanya Galpa	Surendra Mishra	Short Story
215	Phalaguni Tithira Jhia	Manorama Biswal Mohapatra	Verses–Poems
216	Nishanta	Pramod Kumar Tripathi	Plays–One Act Plays
217	Kalahandira Lokasanskruti	Mahendra Kumar Mishra	Essays–Criticism
218	Binsa Shatabdira Odisha– Mo Anubhuti	Bidyadhar Mishra	Biography–Travelogue
219	Bakula Katha	Basant Kumari Debi	Translations
220	Bigyana Muni Kahe Kahani	Jyotirmayee Mohanty	Children's literature

=== 1997, 1998 and 1998 ===
Awarded Books Published in 1997, 1998 and 1999. Awarded in 2000
#	Book	Author	Category of Books
221	Bhumitrushna	Radhamohan Mahapatra	Novel
222	Mun Chakara Kahuchi	Manmath Kumar Satapathy	Plays–One Act Plays
223	Digbalayara E Pakhare	Jayant Kumar Biswal	Essays–Criticism
224	Chunichuni Sunaphula	Batakrushna Swain	Children's literature

=== 1998, 1999 and 2000 ===
Awarded Books Published in 1998, 1999 and 2000. Awarded in 2001
#	Book	Author	Category of Books
225	Nija Sangare Nijara Ladhei	Gourahari Das	Novel
226	Gayatrira Pua	Banaja Devi	Short Story
227	Sabaramati	Satrughna Pandav	Verses–Poems
228	Gan	Ranjit Patnaik	Plays–One Act Plays
229	Aurangajeba	Pradip Bhowmick	Plays–One Act Plays
230	Khordha Itihasara Antarale	Fakir Harichandan	Essays–Criticism
231	Jananayaka Jabahara	Gangadhara Rath	Biography–Travelogue
232	Odisha O Gandhi	Pabak Kanungo	Biography–Travelogue
233	Lauha Kapaata	Raghunath Mahapatra	Translations
234	Hajara Chaurashira Maa	Govind Chandra Sahu	Translations
235	Jhulure Hati Jhula	Snehalata Mohanty	Children's literature
236	Nandakishora Gitibichitra	Nanda Kishore Singh	Lyric poems

=== 1999, 2000 and 2001 ===
Awarded Books Published in 1999, 2000 and 2001. Awarded in 2002
#	Book	Author	Category of Books
237	Jupakathara Pashu	Sanjukta Rout	Novel
238	Tathakathita	Debashis Panigrahi	Short Story
239	Nirbachita Kabita	Shailaja Rabi	Verses–Poems
240	Jugacharita Bruttanta	Hemendra Mahapatra	Plays–One Act Plays
241	Satyabadi Juga–Srashta O Srushti	Nityananda Satpathy	Essays–Criticism
242	Bhinna Ilaka Bhinna Drushti	Baishnab Charan Samal	Essays–Criticism
243	Jibanara Bateghate	Girija Bhusan Patnaik	Biography–Travelogue
244	Manaba Bhumi	Alka Chand	Translations
245	Mahapurushanka Piladina	Anasuya Mishra	Children's literature
246	Thikana Na Thiba Chithi	Gour Patnaik	Lyric poems

=== 2000, 2001 and 2002 ===
Awarded Books Published in 2000, 2001 and 2002. Awarded in 2003
#	Book	Author	Category of Books
247	Mun Kaikeyi Kahuchi	Shanti Mohapatra (née Bal)	Novel
248	Sati	Sadananda Tripathy	Short Story
249	Kunipua O Nishpapa Sakala	Gopal Rath	Verses–Poems
250	Nataka: Shakuntala	Mihir Kumar Meher	Plays–One Act Plays
251	Abujha Andhara	Sulochana Das	Essays–Criticism
252	Jaane Anubhabi Anubhabare	Hrudananda Ray	Biography–Travelogue
253	Lal Salawara	Suryamani Khuntia	Translations
254	Mo Mita: Mo Gita	Birakishore Padhi	Children's literature
255	Rasaraja Giti Bichitra	Narayan Prasad Singh	Lyric poems

=== 2001, 2002 and 2003 ===
Awarded Books Published in 2001, 2002 and 2003. Awarded in 2004
#	Book	Author	Category of Books
256	Ethi Gote Gaan Thila	Rashmi Raul	Novel
257	Jhipi Jhipi Andhara	Rajanikanta Mohanty	Short Story
258	Samayara Dhusara Balire	Nrusingha Kumar Rath	Verses–Poems
259	Bartta	Dileswara Maharana	Plays–One Act Plays
260	Pana O Priyatama	Baishnab Charan Mohanty	Essays–Criticism
261	Aagyan	Subhas Chandra Misra	Biography–Travelogue
262	Surjyamukhira Swapna	Kanan Mishra	Translations
263	Mati Mulakare Saragaphula	Harihar Sukla	Children's literature
264	Champaka Barani Go	Gurukrushna Goswami	Lyric poems

=== 2002, 2003 and 2004 ===
Awarded Books Published in 2002, 2002 and 2003. Awarded in 2005
#	Book	Author	Category of Books
265	Bibarna Pruthibi	Surendra Nayak	Novel
266	Sahayatri	Debabrata Madanroy	Short Story
267	Akashi Manisa	Amaresh Pattnaik	Verses–Poems
268	Pakhi	Bhaskar Chandra Mohapatra	Plays–One Act Plays
269	Ekabinsa Satabdira Sahitya	Raicharan Das	Essays–Criticism
270	Jibanara Pathaprante	Sarat Chandra Mishra	Biography–Travelogue
271	Samadhi Hebani Aau	Soudamini Udgata	Translations
272	Kichiri Michiri Chin	Sunamani Rout	Children's literature
273	Badua Nai	Subash Kar	Lyric poems

=== 2003, 2004 and 2005 ===
Awarded Books Published in 2003, 2004 and 2005. Awarded in 2006
#	Book	Author	Category of Books
274	Soka Divas	Paresh Ku. Patnaik	Novel
275	Birala Rupaka	Paramita Satpathy	Short Story
276	Bharat Barsha	Girija Kumar Baliarsingh	Verses–Poems
277	Kallole Kallola	Saileswar Nanda	Plays–One Act Plays
278	Sambhabami Yuge Yuge	Sudhakar Nanda	Plays–One Act Plays
279	Nirbachita Prabandha Sankatana	Gaganendranath Dash	Essays–Criticism
280	Amerikare Kichidina	Basudev Sahoo	Biography–Travelogue
281	Kurttul-Ain-Haidarnka Nirbachita Kahani	Kumar Hassan	Translations
282	Manika	Malakara	Children's literature
283	Krupajal	Prafulla Kar	Lyric poems

=== 2004, 2005 and 2006 ===
Awarded Books Published in 2004, 2005 and 2006. Awarded in 2007
#	Book	Author	Category of Books
284	Nirvana	Manoj Kumar Mahapatra	Novel
285	Gotie Gaonra Chitrapata	Bisnu Sahoo	Short Story
286	Jhia Pain Jharkatie	Aparna Mohanty	Verses–Poems
287	Ekanta Nijaswa	Ramachandra Mishra	Plays–One Act Plays
288	Madhyabitara Atmabichara	Rabindra Prasad Panda	Essays–Criticism
289	Kadambini Amari Gaon Jhia	Rabi Tripathy	Biography–Travelogue
290	Astaraga	Monalisa Jena	Translations
291	Chikun O Chadhei	Ramesh Patri	Children's literature
292	Giti Barnali	Alekha Chandra Padhiary	Lyric poems

=== 2005, 2006 and 2007 ===
Awarded Books Published in 2005, 2006 and 2007. Awarded in 2008
#	Book	Author	Category of Books
293	Samudra Manisha	Bhima Prusty	Novel
294	Kita O Anyana Galpa	Prakash Mohapatra	Short Story
295	Tanulatara Kabita	Sunil Kumar Prusty	Verses–Poems
296	Kimbadanti	Prasanna Das	Plays–One Act Plays
297	Samskruti, Jagatikarana O Mancha	Gauranga Charan Dash	Essays–Criticism
298	Rajaniti Godabarisha Mishra	Manoranjan Pradhan	Biography–Travelogue
299	Bapu Mo Maa	Asit Mohanty	Translations
300	Manachhuan Geeta	Manas Ranjan Samal	Children's literature
301	Preeti Smruti Hoi Pheriase Jebe	Brundaban Jena	Lyric poems

== See also ==
- Sahitya Akademi Award
- Jnanpith Award
