= Annapurna Devi (writer) =

Indian poet

Annapurna Devi (1883- 1948) was an Indian poet from Odisha, India. She authored Padyamala, published in 1904 and 1905, and her collection of poems Pakshighara was published in 1907. Her work became recognised following her poems dedicated to the newborn of the Queen of Paralakhemundi.

== Works ==
- ପଦ୍ୟମାଳା ଭାଗ ୨ (in Odia). 1905.

== See also ==
- List of Odia writers
