= Reba Roy =

Indian Author

Reba Roy (1876-1957) was an Indian writer of poetry in Odia language, and founder of a high school for girls in Cuttack, Odisha, India.

== See also ==
- List of Odia writers
