= Dinanath Pathy =

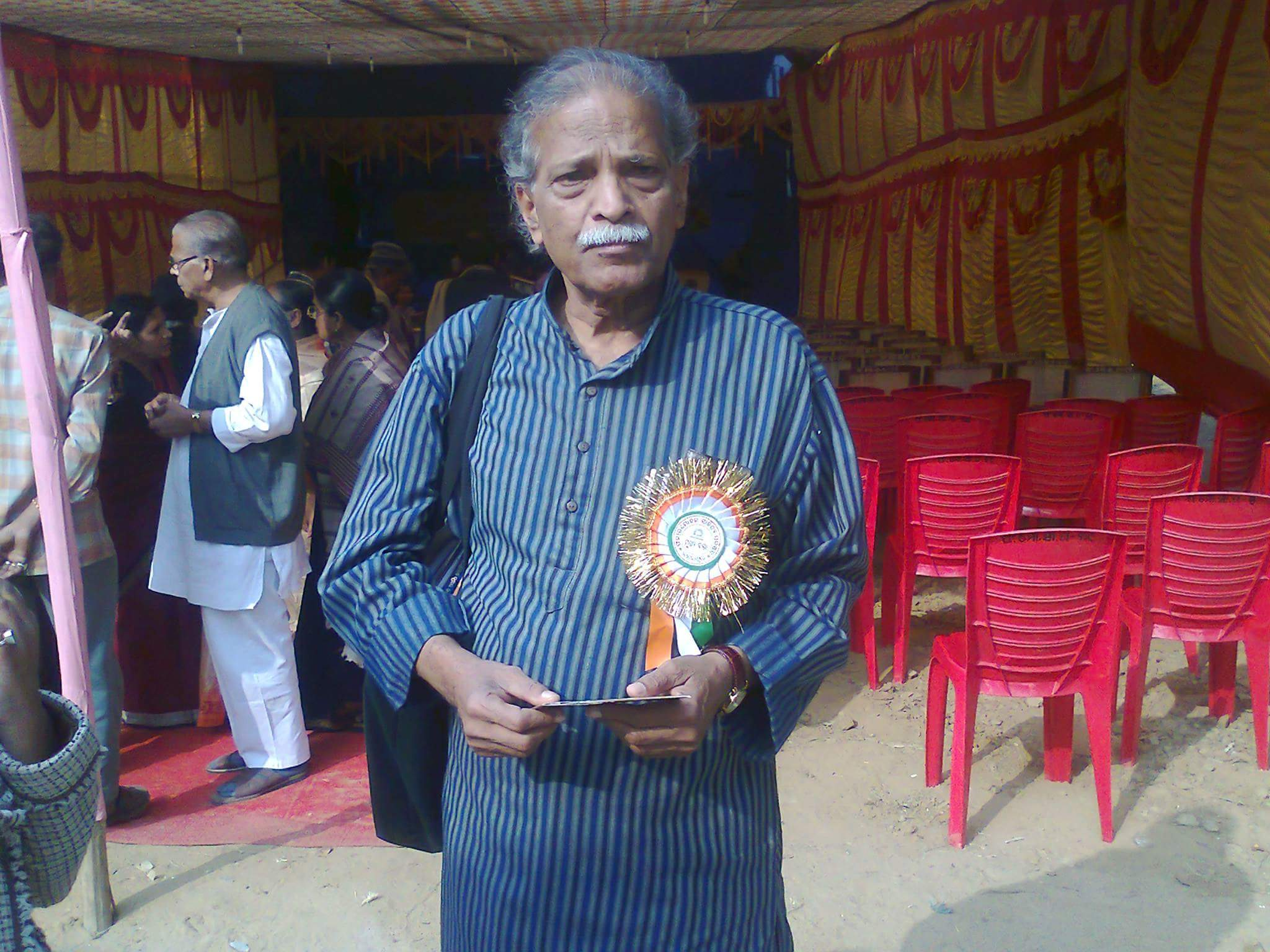
Dr Pathy as chief speaker during Fakir Mohan Senapati's 172nd birth anniversary celebration at Shantikanan, Baleshwar on January 14, 2014

Dinanath Pathy (1942 – 29 August 2016) was an Indian painter, author and art historian from the state of Odisha. Pathy was the former secretary of Lalit Kala Akademi in New Delhi and Bhubaneswar. He was the founding principal of the B.K. College of Art and Crafts. Pathy was awarded the President of India Silver Plaque for painting, Odisha Sahitya Academy Award for autobiography "Digapahandira Drawing Master", and Jawaharlal Nehru Fellowship for his research in art. He was nominated for the International Rietberg Award from Rietberg Society in 2014 for his contributions to research on Indian art history. Pathy authored over 50 books in English, Odia and German on classical, traditional, tribal, folk, rural and contemporary art of Odisha.

Pathy died of cardiac arrest at the age of 74 on 29 August 2016 in Bhubaneswar.

== Early life ==
Pathy was born in 1942 at Digapahandi, Ganjam, Odisha.

== Education ==
Pathy worked as a theater curtain painter and a makeup man with no vocation education. He later graduated in fine arts from Government College of Arts and Crafts Khallikote. Pathy also studied in Utkal University and later in Visva-Bharati University.

== Work ==
He worked as the arts and crafts curator in Odisha State Museum. He was the founder principal of B.K. College of Art and Crafts, Bhubaneswar.

Pathy was the secretary of Lalit Kala Akademi in New Delhi and president of Odisha Lalit Kala Akademi, Bhubaneswar. He worked with Eberhard Fischer, former director Emeritus, Rietberg Museum for over thirty years to promote the arts of Odisha globally. He was working as the chairman of Ila Panda Centre for Arts and director of Alice Boner Institute, Varanasi before his death.

== Awards ==
Pathy was awarded the President of India Silver Plaque for his contribution to painting.

== Bibliography ==
Pathy has authored more than 50 books in English, Odia and German about classical, traditional, tribal, folk, rural and contemporary art of Odisha. He received the Odisha Sahitya Academy Award for his autobiography "Digapahandira Drawing Master".
