= Suchitra Devi =

Indian writer, poet (born 1881)

- Born: 1881
- Died: DOD unknown
- Notable works: Kavitalahari (1901)

Suchitra Devi (born 1881), was an Indian poet and writer of Odia language. Her collection of poetry, Kavitalahari (1901), went into six editions.

== Personal life ==
She married Raghabananda Das of Kuruhjipur in Puri district.

== See also ==
- List of Odia writers
