= Sulakshana =

Sulakshana may refer to:

- Sulakshana (actress), Indian actress in South Indian cinema
- Sulakshana Devi, Indian poet
- Sulakshana Khatri, Indian actress in Gujarati cinema
- Sulakshana Naik, Indian cricketer
- Sulakshana Pandit, Indian playback singer

== See also ==
- Sulakshan Kulkarni, Indian cricketer
