= Krushna Chandra Kar =

Indian poet and literary critic

Pandit Krushna Chandra Kar
- Born: 1 January 1907; Mula Basant, Cuttack, Bengal Presidency
- Died: 2 November 1995 (aged 88); Cuttack, Odisha, India
- Occupations: poet, literary critic, Novelist, essayist
- Known for: Poetic contributions, Children fictions, Biographies and Autobiography
- Notable work: "Ramayana" ,"Shakuntala","Pari Raija","Kuhuka Raija","Panchatantra"

Pandit Krushna Chandra Kar (1 January 1907 – 2 November 1995) was an Indian poet and literary critic who has written both in the Odia and English. He has authored books on Odia literature and inspired other writers like Bidyutprabha Devi and Chakhi Khuntia. He received a felicitation from the Odisha Sahitya Academy for his contribution to Odia literature in the year 1971 to 1972. He spent most of his life in Cuttack, Odisha.

== Career ==
Pandit Krushna Chandra Kar wrote biographies, fictional works, and children's books both before and after Indian independence. He also authored an Odia to English dictionary called the "Taruna Sabdakosh" and an English to Odia dictionary called the "New Method English Dictionary", which has been in use at the Stanford University Libraries.

His better known Odia books include the "Ramayana" and "Shakuntala". He also authored collections of poetry, including "Rutu Samhara" and "Hansa Dutam".

He was arguably best known for children's literature and wrote "Pari Raija", "Kuhuka Raija", "Panchatantra", and "Adi Jugara Galpa Mala", among other works. He wrote biographies of a number of historical personalities such as "Kapila Deva"

One of his famous English books was "The Maharaja : As I Knew Him".

== Awards ==
He received the Odisha Sahitya Academy Feliciation, 1971-72

== Books ==
KABYA

- Srivatsa
- Rutusanhara
- Khandadhara
- Hansaduta
- Pilanka rutusanhara

GATHA

- Gathayani

KABITA (POETRY)

- Kabita sanchayani

NIBANDHA

- Gadya sanchayani

NATAKA AND LOKANATYA (DRAMA)

- Karnajuna (bangala sanlapara anubada, gitamana ra anubadaka rachana)
- ABHIDHANA(DICTIONARY)
- New method English–Oriya dictionary
- Taruna sabdakosa

UCHANGA SAHITYA

- Bilwamangala
- Swadhinatara kahani
- Adijugara galpa
- Bagni biswanatha
- Swami bhairabananda
- Marusambhaba
- Utkal patana
- Hagila dinara smruti(atmacharita)
- Mari amara

KISHORA SAHITYA (ADULT’S LITERATURE)

- Mahabharata katha(part-1)
- Mahabharata katha(part-2)
- Upanishada katha(part-1)
- Upanishada katha(part-2)
- Purana prabha (part-3)
- Purana prabha(part-4)
- Sadhana and sishi(part-1)
- Sadhana and sidhi(part-2)
- Sadhana and sidhi(part-3)
- Bana pahadara sathi
- Akasha rahasya
- Jataka kahani

SISU SAHITYA (CHILDREN'S LITERATURE)

- Laba kusa
- Parsuram
- Purana kahani(part-1)
- Purana kahani(part-2)
- Abhimanyu
- Janamejayav
- Rushi katha(part-1)
- Rushi katha(part-2)
- Sati
- Sunaraija
- Pakhiraja
- Asap katha
- Utkalara baraputra (part-1)
- Utkalara baraputra (part-2)

AMAR CHARITA

- Bhaktakabi madhusudana
- Kabibara radhanatha
- Samanta Chandra sekhara
- Sudhala deba
- Purushotam deba
- Mukunda deba
- Kulabrudha madhusudhana
- Utkalamani gopabandhu
- Karmabira gourishankar
- Sudramuni sarala
- Purana prabha(part-1)
- Purana prabha(part-2)
- Sejugara gapa(panchatantra)
- Sejugara chatra
- Panchatantra galpa(part-1)
- Panchatantra galpa(part-2)
- Panchatantra galpa(part-3)
- Bharata gouraba(part-1)
- Bharata gouraba(part-2)
- Nana desara upakatha(part-1)
- Nana desara upakatha(part-2)

SISU UPANYASA (CHILDREN'S NOVEL) SERIES OF SUNARAIJA

- suna padua
- suna bauda
- suna chadhei
- suna panjuri
- suna baisi
- suna changudi

SERIES OF KUHUKA RAIJA

- kuhuka ghoda
- kuhuka kothi
- kuhuka janha
- kuhuka deepa
- kuhuka rani
- kuhuka mala

SERIES OF PARIMAHALA

- saraga pari
- golapi pari
- shagara pari
- jharana pari
- sapana pari
- jochana pari

SADHABA GHARA KATHA

- Sadhaba budha
- Sadhaba budhi
- Sadhaba pua
- Sadhaba jhia
- Sadhaba bohu
- Sadhaba nati

== Bibliography ==
- Rämayana in Ordisi pata painting:-
- Taruṇa śabdakosha:-
- Makers of Modern Orissa:-
- Hajilā dinara smr̥ti:-
- Svāmī Bhairabānanda :-
- New Method English to oriya dictionary

== See also ==
- List of Indian poets
- Odia literature
- Odia language
