= Kishori Charan Das =

Odia writer

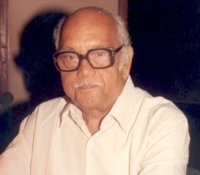
- Born: 1924; Cuttack, Odisha
- Died: 17 August 2004 (aged 79–80)
- Occupations: writer, poet
- Writing career
- Language: Odia
- Notable awards: Sahitya Akademi Award : 1976; Odisha Sahitya Academy Award : 1976

Kishori Charan Das (1924 – 17 August 2004), also known by his short name K.C. Das, was an eminent Indian writer and translator of the Odia and English language. He was known for his master interpretation of choices, disillusionment, and insecurities of the Odia middle class. His stories showcase realities of everyday life and do not delve into preaching morals or convey messages. He received the Sahitya Akademi Award in 1976 for his short story collection Thakura Ghara. He was also awarded with the Sarala Puraskar in 1985 and Bishuva Puraskar in 1992.

== Biography ==
Das was born in 1924 in Cuttack, Odisha. He worked as additional deputy comptroller and auditor general of India and director of audit, Indian accounts, Washington, D.C., 1961–1964.

He died on 17 August 2004.

== Writing style ==
Das published several collections of short stories, novels, essays, poems. He was one of the exponents of modernism in Odia literature. The characters of his fictions come from urban setting, with disrupted dreams, inner-conflict and existential anguish. Writing about the Odia society and the challenges of modern day life in post independence India where the middle class is aspirational and sometimes impatient. Although his stories begin on a simple note, they eventually reach their culmination in unexpected and surprising ways. He maintained that writing 'expresses a writer's relationship with various emotions' and 'no writing can belong to any class or community', but 'it belongs to the whole world'. He has also translated writings by other Oriya authors.

== Books ==
=== Short story ===
- Bhanga Khelana (1961)
- Ghara Bahuda (1968)
- Laksha Vihanga (1968)
- Manihara (1970)
- Thakura Ghara (1975)
- Gaman (1980)
- Khelara nam ranga (1982)
- Bhinna Paunsha (1984)
- Death of an Indian (1984)
- Shita Lahara (1986)
- Trango Mryutu (1987)
- Nija Sanja (1992)
- The Midnight Moon and other Stories (1993)

=== Poetry collection ===
- Faces in the Dark (1980)
- Mana Kamana (1983)

=== Novels ===
- Satoti Dinara Sati (1993)
- Neta O Netramani (1997)

== Honours ==
He was awarded the Odisha Sahitya Academy Award in 1976, Sarala Puraskar in 1985 and Bishuva Puraskar in 1992. He received the Sahitya Akademi Award in 1976 for his short story collection Thakura Ghara.

The Kishori Charan Smruti Sansad was established in his honour which gives an award named Kishori Charan Das Sahitya Purashkar to an Odia writer annually since 2007.
