= Manorama Mohapatra =

Indian writer and poet (1934–2021)

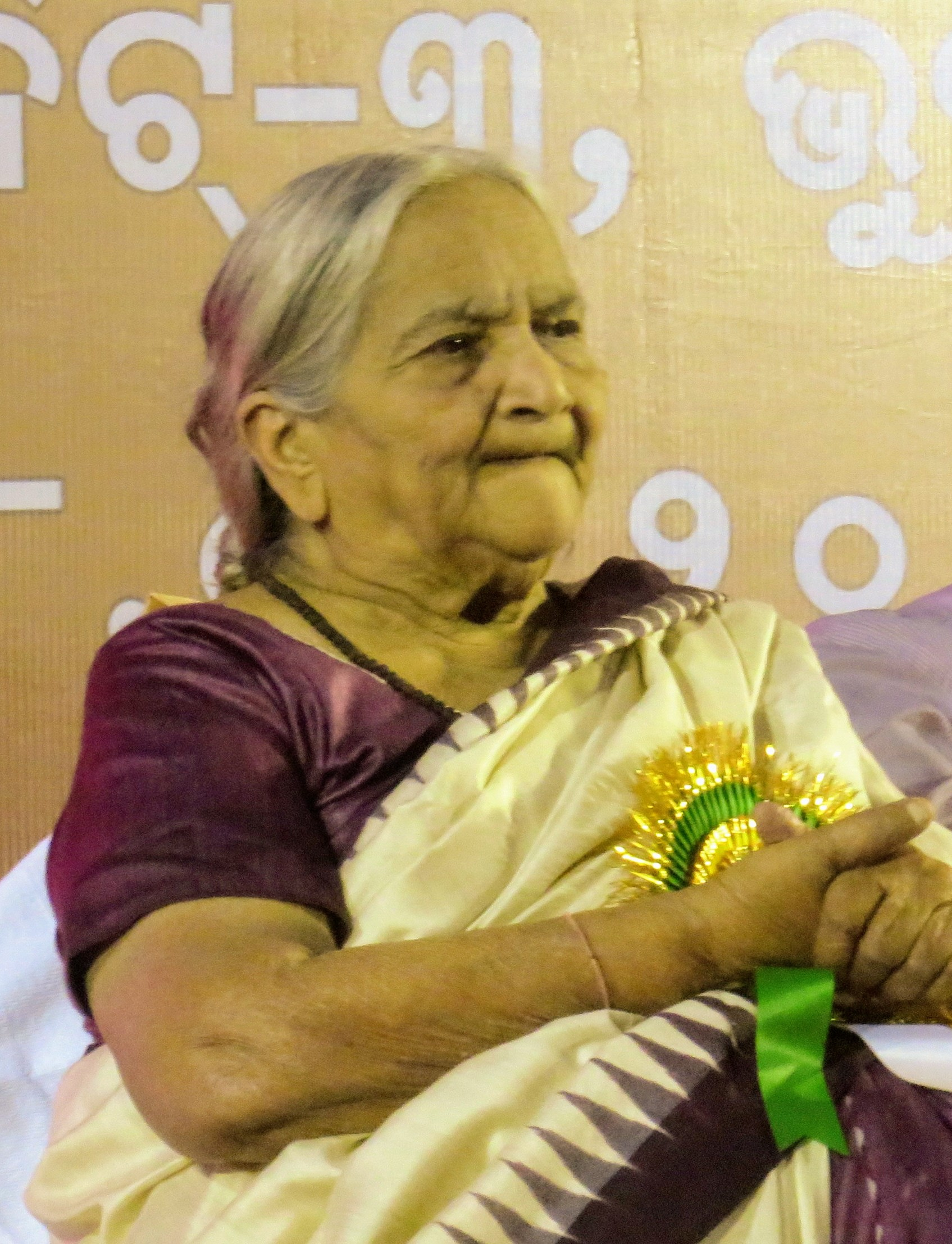
Manorama Mohapatra at Bhubaneswar Odisha, 2 December 2012

Manorama Mohapatra (10 June 1934 – 18 September 2021) was an Indian writer, poet, and editor, working primarily in the Odia language. She wrote forty books consisting of novels and poetry, and edited an Odia newspaper, The Samaj. She was the recipient of several literary awards, including Odisha state's highest literary honor, the Odisha Sahitya Akademi Award in 1984. She was the first woman to be elected president of the Odisha State Sahitya Akademi, a literary organization for the state of Odisha.

== Life ==
Mohapatra was born in 1934 in Odisha, India. Her father, Dr Radhanath Rath was the editor of an Odia-language daily newspaper, The Samaj. Her undergraduate education was in economics, at Ravenshaw University in Odisha. She briefly taught economics. She died on 18 September 2021, and her funeral was performed with state honors.

== Career ==
Mohapatra began her career as a columnist for the daily newspaper The Samaj, which was edited by her father, writing on politics and contemporary issues. She later succeeded him as the editor of the newspaper. in 1960, she published her first book of poetry, Juar Jeiunthi Uthe, which focused on themes of empowering women. She went on to write forty books, including novels and poetry, primarily in the Odia language, but also in Bengali. Some significant works include Ardhanareeswara, Baidehi Visarjita, Sanghatir Samhita, Shakti Rupena Sansthita, Roopam Roopam Pratirupam, Smruti Chandan, Samay Purusha, and Smritir Naimisharanya. She also performed publicly, as an orator. From 1982 to 1990, she was elected president of a literary society, the Utkal Sahitya Samaj, and from 1991 to 1994, she was elected the first woman president of the state literary society, the Odisha Sahitya Akademi.

Mohapatra's contributions to literature were recognised publicly following her death, with the Chief Minister of Odisha, Naveen Patnaik, noting that in addition to her writing, she "...played a key role in creating awareness on different social problems, rights of women and problems faced by them." Mohapatra's writing focused on themes of empowering women, dealing with contemporary issues and politics concerning women's rights. Mohapatra also volunteered with a number of charitable organizations in Odisha, including the Red Cross Society, Social Service Guild of Orissa, and Lok Sevak Mandal.

== Awards ==
Mohapatra won a number of literary awards during her career, including:

- 1984 - Odisha Sahitya Akademi Award
- 1988 - Soviet Nehru Award
- 1990 - Critics' Circle Award of India
- 1991 - Iswar Chandra Vidyasagar Samman
- 1994 - Rupambara Award
- 2013 - Sarala Samman
- Utkal Sahitya Samaj Award
- Gangadhar Meher Samman
- Sahitya Praveena Award
- Sucharita Award

== Bibliography ==
Notable works by Mohapatra include Juar Jeiunthi Uthe (1960) (poetry), Band Gharara Kabat (short stories), as well as Ardhanareeswara, Baidehi Visarjita, Sanghatir Samhita, Shakti Rupena Sansthita, Roopam Roopam Pratirupam, Smruti Chandan, Samay Purusha, Smritir Naimisharanya, 151 Poems, Arup Aalo in Bengali, Ye Prithvi Sarsajjya, and Uttara Niruttara.
