= Sulakshana Devi =

Indian poet

Sulakshana Devi (born 1820 or 1829 - 1901) was an Indian poet of Odia language. After the death of her husband she devoted herself to God and wrote a collection of poems published in a book titled Parijatamala.

== See also ==
- List of Odia writers
