= Keshab Chandra Dash =

Indian scholar (born 1955)

- Born: 6 March 1955 (age 71); Jajpur, Odisha, India
- Known for: Sanskrit literature
- Spouse: Smt. Subhadra Dash
- Children: Pushpa Dash, Nabotpal Dash, Nilotpal Dash
- Awards: Odisha Sahitya Academy Award (1990); Delhi Sanskrit Academy Award (1991); Sahitya Akademi Award (1996); Banabhatta Puraskar, (Uttar Pradesh Sanskrit Sansthan, Lucknow) (1996); Kalpavalli Puraskar, (Bharatiya Bhasha Parisad, Calcutta) (1996-97); Veda Vyas National Sanskrit Award, U.G.C. New Delhi (2003)
- Scientific career
- Fields: Sanskrit Linguistics Sanskrit literature Indian Culture
- Workplaces: Department of Nyaya; Shri Jagannath Sanskrit University, Puri
- Website: http://profkeshabchandradash.blogspot.in/

Keshab Chandra Dash (born 6 March 1955 in Jajpur, Odisha, India), is a scholar and author from Odisha.

== Scholarship ==
Dash is a specialist in the areas of Indian Logic, Panini Grammar, Computational Linguistics. Indian philosophy and Modern Sanskrit literature. He has contributed to the fields of computer studies relating to Sanskrit, stylistic innovation in modern Sanskrit literature and advance methodology of research in Sanskrit. His approach is interdisciplinary as well as multidisciplinary.

== Authorship ==
Dash is a novelist and poet, and he has published a number of novels in modern Sanskrit. His authorship was the subject of a PhD thesis in 2013.

== Early life and education ==
Dash was born on 6 March 1955, at the village of Hatasahi, Jajpur District, Odisha. His father was Narayan Dash and mother Kumudini Devi. He is married to Subhadra Dash.

Dash has received the following degrees: M.A., M.Phil., Ph.D., D.Litt., Acharya (M.A.), Parangata (M.A.), Ratna (M.A.) and Diplomas in German, French, Film Direction and Computer Programming.

== Career ==
Dash started his career as a lecturer in 1980. For the last several years, he has headed the post graduate department of Nyaya Darsana in Shri Jagannatha Sanskrit University, Puri, Orissa.

== Publications ==
- Books: 40 (Research, Sanskrit Novel, Sanskrit Stories and Sanskrit Poetry)
- Research paper: 40 (On Sanskrit, Linguistics, Philosophy & Interdisciplinary Field)
- General Articles: 100 (On Culture, Literature, Philosophy)

=== Poetry ===
1. Pranayā Pradīpam (The Lamp of Love), (प्रणयप्रदीपम्), Sudharma, Mysore, 1980
2. Hrdayesvari (The Goddess of Heart), (हृदयेश्वरी), Sudharma, Mysore, 1981
3. Mahātīrtham (The Great Shrine), (महातीर्थम्), Sudharma, Mysore, 1983
4. Alakā (The Myth of Destination), (अलका), Lokbhasa Prachara Samiti, Sharadhabali, Puri-752002, 1986
5. Iśā (The Supreme), (ईशा), Smt. Subhadra Dash, Śaśirekhā, Bhoodan Nagar, University Road, Puri-752003, 1992 (Awarded)
6. Bhinna-Pulinam (A Separate Shore), (भिन्न-पुलिनम्), Smt. Subhadra Dash, Śaśirekhā, Bhoodan Nagar, University Road, Puri-752003, 1995
7. Andhasrotah (Selected Sanskrit Poems with English Translation), (अन्धस्रोतः), Smt. Subhadra Dash, Śaśirekhā, Bhoodan Nagar, University Road, Puri-752003, 2004

=== Short stories ===
8. Diśā Vidiśā (Direction and Beyond), (दिशा विदिशा), Lokbhasa Prachara Samiti, Sharadhabali, Puri-752002, 1988
9. Urmi Cuḍā (The Crest of Wave), (ऊर्मिचूडा), M/s Pratibha Prakashan, 29/5, Shakti Nagar, Delhi-7, 1995 (Awarded)
10. Shūnyanābhiḥ (The Empty Navel), (शून्यनाभिः), Lokbhasa Prachara Samiti, Sharadhabali, Puri-752002, 2000
11. Nimna Prthivī (The Under World), (निम्नपृथिवी), Lokbhasa Prachara Samiti, Sharadhabali, Puri-752002, 2001

=== Children’s Stories ===
12. Mahān (The Great), (महान्), Lokbhasa Prachara Samiti, Sharadhabali, Puri-752002, 1991
13. Ekadā (Once Upon a Time), (एकदा), Lokbhasa Prachara Samiti, Sharadhabali, Puri-752002, 1991

=== Juvenile Novelette ===
14. Patākā (The Flag), (पताका), Lokbhasa Prachara Samiti, Sharadhabali, Puri-752002, 1990

=== Novels ===
15. Tilottamā (Signifies a Name), (तिलोत्तमा), Sudharma, Mysore, 1980, Reprint-2002, Smt. Subhadra Dash, Śaśirekhā, Bhoodan Nagar, University Road, Puri-752003
16. Śitalatrsnā (Frosted Attachment), (शीतलतृष्णा), Lokbhasa Prachara Samiti, Sharadhabali, Puri-752002, 1983 & 2006
17. Pratipad (The First Day), (प्रतिपद्), Lokbhasa Prachara Samiti, Sharadhabali, Puri-752002, 1984
18. Āvartam (The Whirl), (आवर्त्तम्), Devyajyoti, Shimla, H.P., 1985
19. Arunā (The Blush), (अरुणा), Sudharma, Mysore, 1985
20. Nikasā (The Nearest), (निकषा), Devavani Parishad, R-6, Vanivihar, Delhi-59, 1986
21. Rtam (The Highest Truth), (ऋतम्), Devavani Parishad, R-6, Vanivihar, Delhi-59, 1988 (Awarded)
22. Madhuyānam (The Sweet Path), (मधुयानम्), Lokbhasa Prachara Samiti, Sharadhabali, Puri-752002, 1990
23. Añjalih (The Supplication), (अञ्जलिः), Lokbhasa Prachara Samiti, Sharadhabali, Puri-752002, 1990
24. Visargah (The Sacrifice), (विसर्गः), Lokbhasa Prachara Samiti, Sharadhabali, Puri-752002, 1992
25. Śikhā (The Flame), (शिखा), Lokbhasa Prachara Samiti, Sharadhabali, Puri-752002, 1994
26. Śaśirekhā (The Moon Beam), (शशिरेखा), Lokbhasa Prachara Samiti, Sharadhabali, Puri-752002, 1994
27. Oum Śāntih (The Peace), (ॐ शान्तिः), M/s Pratibha Prakashan, 29/5, Shakti Nagar, Delhi-7, 1997 (Awarded)

=== Research Works ===
1. Reference: A Logico-Linguistic Identification, Abhaya House of Publication, Kendrapara, Pin-754211, Orissa, 1986
2. Relations in Knowledge Representations, Sri Satguru Publication, Indian Books Centre, 40/5, Shakti Nagar, Delhi-7, 1991
3. Elements of Research Methodology in Sanskrit, Chowkhamba Sanskrit Sansthan, Post Box no. 1139, K.37/116.
4. Logic of Knowledge Base, Sri Satguru Publication, Indian Books Centre, 40/5, Shakti Nagar, Delhi-7, 1992
5. Logic of Non-Case Relationship, M/s Pratibha Prakashan, 29/5, Shakti Nagar, Delhi-7, 1992
6. Social Justice and its Ancient Indian Base, (Edited): Proceedings of the U.G.C., Sponsored National Seminar, M/s Pratibha Prakashan, 29/5, ShaktiNagar, Delhi-7, 1992
7. Indian Semantics A Computational Model, (Edited): Agam Kala Prakashan,34, Central Market, Ashok Vihar, Delhi-52, 1994
8. Sanskrit & Computer, (Edited), M/s Pratibha Prakashan, 29/5, Shakti Nagar, Delhi-7, 1995
9. An Easy Approach to Spiritual Science, Smt. Subhadra Dash, Sasirekha, Bhoodan Nagar, University Road, Puri-752003, 2004
10. International Conference on Spiritual Science (Ed.), Department of Nyaya Darshan, SJSV, Puri, 2004
11. An Introduction to Oriya Linguistics, Centre of Advanced Research in Sanskrit, SJSV, Puri, 2006
12. Spiritual Attainment (Ed.), M/s Pratibha Prakashan, 29/5, Shakti Nagar, Delhi-7, 2006
13. Unknown Facets of Jagannatha Consciousness (Ed.), Centre of Advanced Research in Sanskrit, SJSV, Puri, 2006

=== Research Publications (Journals) ===
1. Sri Jagannath Jyoti (An Indological Research Journal), Vol-IX, X, XI (Edited): Sri Jagannatha Sanskrit Vishvavidyalaya, Puri, 2004, 2005, 2006
2. SAMKETA (A Departmental Research Journal), Department of Nyaya Darshan, SJSV, Puri, 2004, 2005, 2006

=== Spiritual Biography ===
Pratibuddha (The Enlightened), Dept. of Nyaya Darshan, SJSV, Puri, 2015

== Awards and honours ==
For his literary contribution, Dash has received regional, national and international awards.

1. Hirakhanda Trust literary Award, Sambalpur, 1983
2. Film Development script award, Cuttack, 1983
3. Shravani Sahitya Samsad Honour, Kendrapara, 1984
4. Vidwanmani – Title Award, Cuttack, 1984
5. Tantra Saraswati – Title Award, Cuttack, 1985
6. Dr. V Raghavan National Prize, All India Oriental conference, Vishakhapattanam, 1989
7. International Award of SANKARA (Sanskrit and Knowledge - Base Application and Research Association) Instituted by Abhinava Vidya Bharati, 1990. U.S.A
8. Orissa Sahitya Academy Award, 1990
9. Delhi Sanskrit Academy Award, 1991
10. Sanskrit Tele-film Script Award (Delhi Sanskrit Academy, Delhi), 1994
11. International Poet of Merit Award, International Society of poets, Maryland, US, 1995
12. Central Sahitya Academy Award Delhi, 1996
13. Banabhatta Puraskar, (Uttar Pradesh Sanskrit Sansthan, Lucknow) 1996
14. Kalpavalli Puraskar, (Bharatiya Bhasha Parisad, Calcutta) 1996 – 97
15. Pandit Kulamani Mishra Award, Rotary Club, Puri, 1998.
16. All India Original Creative writing Award, Delhi Sanskrit Academy, 2001
17. Veda Vyas National Sanskrit Award, U.G.C. New Delhi – 2003
18. American Medal of Honour Limited Striking 2003, ABI, USA
19. Bharati - Bharati - Kavya – Samman, Sanskrit Sahitya Academy, Cuttack 2006
20. Vivekananda Samman for Art & Literature (Bengal Academy of Poetry), Kolkata – 2010-11

== Bibliography ==
1. Shri Jagannath Sanskrit Vishvavidyalaya (http://www.sjsv.nic.in/)
2. Inventory of Sanskrit Scholars, RASHTRIYA SANSKRIT SANSTHAN, Deemed University, New Delhi, Complete Paper
3. SAHITYA AKADEMI AWARD (1996) - SANSKRIT, List of Akademi Award Winners
4. Public Lecture for National Mission for Manuscripts, April 2011, Refer Lecture
5. RASHTRIYA SANSKRIT SANSTHAN, Sanskrit Studies in Orissa by Prof A.C.Swain - Ref. Section Modern Sanskrit Literature
6. Karnataka State Open University, Syllabus for Ph.D. Entrance Test in Sanskrit - 2013,
7. Osmania University, Research Paper: KARAKA THEORY OF NAVYA-NYAYA PHILOSOPHY, Refer Article
8. HANDBOOK OF UNIVERSITIES, Ameeta Gupta, Ashish Kumar, ISBN 81-269-0607-3,81-269-0608-1,81-269-0609-X, Pg. 778
9. Encyclopedia of Indian Philosophies: Bibliography, Volumes 1–2, edited by Karl H. Potter, Pg. 1053:
10. UGC NATIONAL SEMINAR ON KNOWLEDGE MODEL, March 2009
11. Lecture on Linguistics and Research Methodology at Sri Chandrasekharendra Saraswathi Viswa Mahavidyalaya, 11 & 12 November 2007, Refer Lecture
12. UNIVERSITY of WASHINGTON, Faculty Books, Secondary Literature, NV394 Keshab Chandra Dash, Relations in Knowledge Representation: An Interdisciplinary Study in Nyaya, Mima?sa, Vyakara?a, Tantra, Modern Linguistics and Artificial Intelligence. Delhi 1991
