= Rabindra Prasad Panda =

Indian Odia-language writer

- ରବୀନ୍ଦ୍ର ପ୍ରସାଦ ପଣ୍ଡା
- Born: 21 November 1937; Chhatrapada, Bhadrak, Odisha
- Died: 15 April 2026 (aged 88); Kolkata, West Bengal
- Occupation: Writer
- Writing career
- Language: Odia
- Notable work: Madhyabitta Atmabichara
- Notable awards: Odisha Sahitya Academi Award, 2007

Rabindra Prasad Panda (21 November 1937 – 15 April 2026) was an Odia-language writer from Odisha, India.। In 2007, he got the Odisha Sahitya Academi Award for this book Madhyabitta Atmabichara.

== Biography ==
Panda was born on 21 November 1937 at Chhatrapada in Bhadrak district of Odisha. He completed his high school education from Chandbali Ghulam Muhammad School and then studied from Bhadrak High School, later in Ravenshaw College and completed his higher education from Lucknow and joined the civil service as an OES officer. He retired in 1995. During his student days, he edited the magazine Jagran and the front page of the Students' Union, Aagami, and later the quarterly magazine Kabita.

=== Controversies ===
He was arrested on March 14, 2008, in Kolkata for alleged inappropriate content and a picture published on the cover page of the book Hazrat Muhammad. Police booked him under section 295-A (Deliberate and malicious acts, intended to outrage religious feelings or any class by insulting its religion or religious beliefs) of IPC following an FIR filed on basis of allegations by an organisation of Cuttack Dewan Baazar on March 11, 2008.

After his bail was rejected by Cuttack SDJM, he was sent to Choudwar jail. Later, he was granted bail and he moved the high court filing a petition against the case. Meanwhile, the publisher Bidyapuri withdrew the controversial book from the market. The Odisha High Court has turned down the criminal case filed against Panda over this book adopting the petition filed by Panda in the high court, a bench of Justice BR Sarangi quashed the case that was in the Cuttack SDJM court.

=== Death ===
He died on 15 April 2026 at 88.

=== Published books ===
- Madhyabitta Atmabichara
- Choudwara Jailre Pancharati
- Bata Hudi Bata Khoji
- Aristotle
- Darwin
- Hazrat Muhammad
- Niyati Sahita Abhisara
- Plato
- Udara Mudara Tara
- Samayara Chhai (poem)
- Antarjali Iswara o Kabira Antyesti

=== Translated books ===
- Yogesh Chandra Ray Bidyanidhi, Ja Manepade
- Rabindranathanka Gora
- Rabindranathanka Galpaguchha

== Awards ==
- Odisha Sahitya Academi Award, 2007 – Essays–Criticism
