= Binod Kanungo =

Indian educationalist and author (1912–1990)

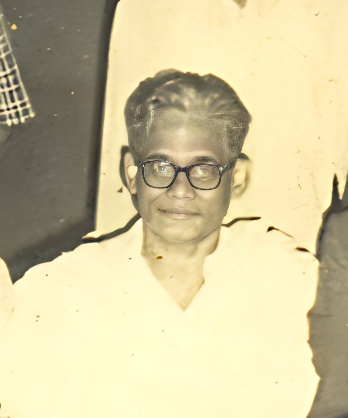
- Born: 6 June 1912; Mallipur, Cuttack district, Bihar and Orissa Province, British India
- Died: 22 June 1990; Cuttack, Odisha
- Awards: Odisha Sahitya Akademi (1983); Padmashree

Binod Kanungo (1912–1990) was an Odia author, freedom fighter, Gandhian, educator, social reformer and compiler of the Gyana Mandala, which is the greatest encyclopaedia in the Odia language. He also won the Odisha Sahitya Akademi Award for his travelogue Runa Parishodha (1983). He was also a veteran freedom fighter and notable educationist. He was awarded with India's fourth highest civilian honour "Padmashree". He died on 22 June 1990.

== Early life and education ==
Kanungo was born on 6 June 1912 in a Karan family at village Mallipur (Kishannagar) in Cuttack district of Bihar and Orissa Province, British India. He was the only son of Keshub Chandra Kanungo and Peera Dei. He had his primary education at village Naganpur and secondary school education at the famous Ranihat Highschool, Cuttack, of which he was the first ever student. Later he got a scholarship to study at Ravenshaw Collegiate School. However, in 1930, when he was in Class-X, Mahatma Gandhi's call inspired him to leave his studies and join the Indian Freedom Movement.

== Career as a journalist and social reformer ==
Kanungo was appointed by the daily newspaper The Samaja to cover Mahatama Gandhi's Harijan Padayatra from Puri to Bhadrak in 1934. During this period Gandhiji taught, advised and groomed Binod Kanungo in the art of news reporting. Later he worked with the eminent Gandhian Gopabandhu Choudhury and joined The Samaja as an assistant editor. He was jailed for his participation in the freedom struggle. In 1952 he fought the first general elections in India and lost.

== Work on Jnanmandal ==
In 1954 he set his sight on compiling the monumental Odia encyclopaedia Jnanmandal. The first volume was released on 2 December 1960 by Harekrushna Mahatab, the then Chief Minister of Odisha. He compiled and edited the major part of the Jnanmandal at his Barabati Stadium office at Cuttack. He single-handedly built the reference centre, which was visited and extolled by a great many dignitaries during his time, including Pranab Mukherjee, who later became President of India. Jnanmandal, though incomplete, has been hailed as one of the best edited and most lucid encyclopaedias in any of the modern Indian languages. During his lifetime although he created the Jnanmandal Foundation, it could not complete his work which was later completed by his son Deepak Kanungo who is also a reference worker in Odia language. The Foundation is carrying on his work to this day. After his death, the Foundation has created and published different kinds of multi-volume encyclopaedias both for young and adult readers by editorial efforts of Deepak Kanungo. This new set consists of thousands of topics in popular Odia comprising all branches of human knowledge and is profusely illustrated. It is a matter of great satisfaction for the Odia people that the Encyclopedia Centre, which late Kanungo created towards the end of his life, is active in Bhubaneswar and holds all the documents late Kanungo collected during his lifetime.

== Notable works ==
Although Jnanmandal was his magnum opus, he wrote numerous popular books in Odia including travelogues, biographies, children's books and also more than a hundred books on science and technology. He set up the Jnanmandal Foundation for the propagation of encyclopaedic knowledge among common people at affordable cost. He devoted his entire life to the popularisation of science and technical knowledge. Recently an institution devoted to development of Odia language has been launched in his honour. The said Binode Kanungo Centre for Excellence in Odia Language (Binode Kanungo Odia-Bhasha Utkarsha Kendra) has massive plans to make Odia a language of knowledge and living. Some of his booklets written for the children on various topics are listed below (incomplete, there are about 30 such booklets):

1. duishaha chha khandi kaaunri kathi (206 magical sticks) - a book on human orthopaedics
2. badanka badei rahilaa naahin ( ) -
3. chalanta raaijara amuhaan naee (mouthless river of the moving kingdom) - blood circulatory system of human beings
4. naa debaataa kede kashta (its so difficult naming) - on naming conventions of various systems

== Awards and honours ==
He won Odisha Sahitya Akademi Award in 1984 for his semi-autobiographical travelogue Runa Parishodha. He was honoured by the President of India with the coveted Padmashree title.

On 2 May 2013, a statue of Binod Kanungo was installed on the premises of the Odisha State Archives. A museum is being built in Bhubaneswar to display the rare collections and manuscripts of Binod Kanungo.

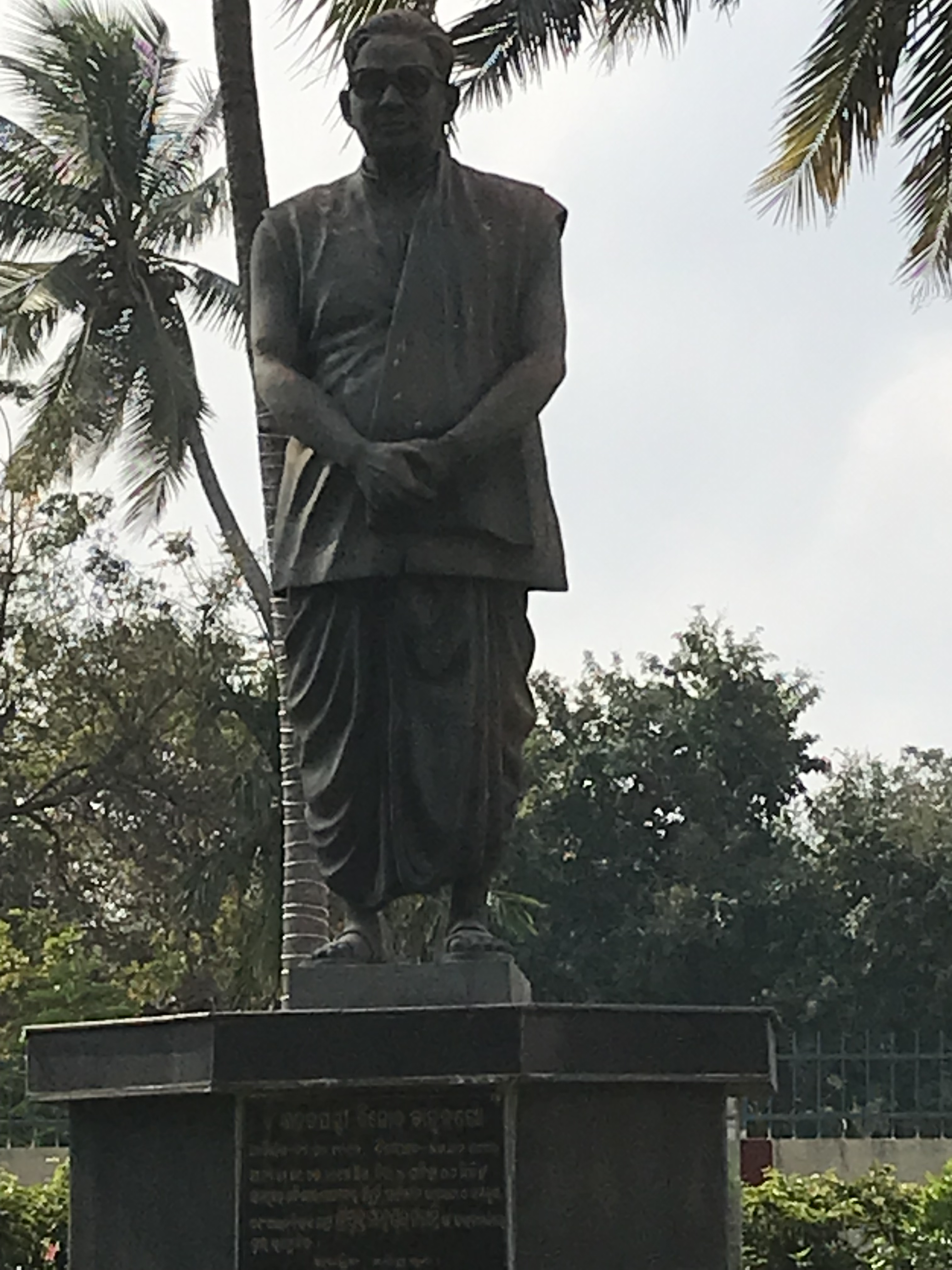
Binod Kanungo Statue at Odisha State Archives

== See also ==
- Odisha Sahitya Akademi Award
- "Biography of Binod Kanungo"
