= List of Odia writers =

This is a list of notable Odia language writers from Odisha, India from the 8th century onward.

== Charyagiti era of Buddhist poets (7th – 8th century A.D ) ==
- Sarahapada

== Age of Sarala Yuga (15th century A.D) ==
- Sarala Das (1465 ?)

== Panchasakha era (15th – 16th century A.D) ==
- Atibadi Jagannath Das (c. 1491-1550)
- Achyutananda Das
- Balaram Das

== Age of Upendra Bhanja ==
- Kabi Samrat Upendra Bhanja (C. 1688-1740)
- Kavisurya Baladev Rath (c. 1789 – 1845)

== Age of Radhanath ==
- Fakir Mohan Senapati
- Gangadhar Meher
- Radhanath Ray
- Madhusudan Rao
- Nanda Kishore Bal
- Reba Ray

== Post-colonial age ==
- Gangadhar Meher
- Sachidananda Routray
- Brajanath Rath
- Hussain Rabi Gandhi
- Binod Chandra Nayak
- Manorama Mohapatra

== Poetry ==
- Brajanath Rath
- Ramakanta Rath
- Dr Prasanna Kumar Mishra
- Hussain Rabi Gandhi
- Sitakanta Mohapatra
- Haraprasad Das
- Pratibha Satpathy

== Novelists ==
- Gopinath Mohanty
- Surendra Mohanty
- Manoj Das
- Santanu Kumar Acharya
- Pratibha Ray
- Gourahari Das
- Binapani Mohanty

== Women's writings and feminism ==
- Sarojini Sahoo
- Archana Nayak
- Nandini Sahu

== Children's literature ==
Odia children's literature' has a long history. Its roots are in Moukhika Sishu Sahitya, which is a part of the Loka Sahitya meant for children. As its development started after modern education was implemented, Odia children's literature is divided into two categories, Odia Moukhika children's literature and Odia written children's literature.

- Ramakrushna Nanda
- Krutibas Nayak
- Adikanda Mahanta

== Drama/plays ==
- Manoranjan Das
- Gopal Chhotray

== Short stories ==
- Baidyanath Misra
- Fakir Mohan Senapati
- Surendra Mohanty
- Manoj Das
- Jagadish Mohanty
- Sarojini Sahoo
- Gourahari Das
- Hussain Rabi Gandhi
- Banaja Devi

== Popular science ==
- Binod Kanungo
- Gokulananda Mohapatra
- Ramesh Chandra Parida
- Kamalakanta Jena

== See also ==
- Odia literature
- Odia language
- Odia people
- List of people from Odisha
