= Subodh Patnaik =

Screenwriter and dialogue writer in Odia language films

- Born: Cuttack, Odisha, India
- Died: September 17, 2017 (aged 70)
- Occupations: Screenwriter, Stage actor
- Years active: 1984-2017

Subodh Patnaik was a screenwriter and dialogue writer in Odia language films. He also received Odisha Sahitya Academy Award for his book 'Ho Bhagate' for category One-act play in 1990.

== Career ==
In 1984, Brajaraj Movie's 'Danda Balunga' was the first film Patnaik was showcased his talent as a scriptwriter. After Danda Balunga he never looked back, went on to work in many Odia language films like Mamata Mage Mula, Chaka Bhaunri, Jaiphula, Pua Mora Kala Thakura, Jaga Hata Re Pagha, Sankha Sindura and Baje Bainsi Nache Ghungura. He had contributed in above 60 Odia films for Odia cinema and also acted in more than 50 Odia plays. One of his play 'Mahajatra' was shown during National theatre festival at Paradip in 2010.

== Selected filmography ==
- Danda Balunga (1984)
- Mamata Mage Mula
- Chaka Bhaunri
- Jaiphula
- Pua Mora Kala Thakura
- Jaga Hata Re Pagha
- Sankha Sindura
- Baje Bainsi Nache Ghungura

== Death ==
He died due to cardiac arrest at his residence at Cuttack on 16 September 2017.
