= Kanan Mishra =

Indian Odia-language writer

- Born: 2 January 1944; Cuttack, Odisha, India
- Died: 7 March 2015 (aged 71); Cuttack
- Occupations: Writer, teacher
- Writing career
- Language: Odia
- Genre: Poet
- Notable work: Suryamukhira swapna
- Notable awards: Odisha Sahitya Akademi Award

Kanan Mishra (1944–2015) was an Odia writer.

== Biography ==
Mishra was born on 1 January 1944 at Cuttack, Odisha. She wrote five novels, four collections of poetry, one English featured novel and seven children's stories. She was married. She died on 7 March 2015 at the age of 71.

== Awards ==
For her translated book Suryamukhi ra Swapna she received the Odisha Sahitya Akademi Award from the state government of Odisha.
