= Chandrasekhar Rath =

Indian Odia litterateur (died 2018)

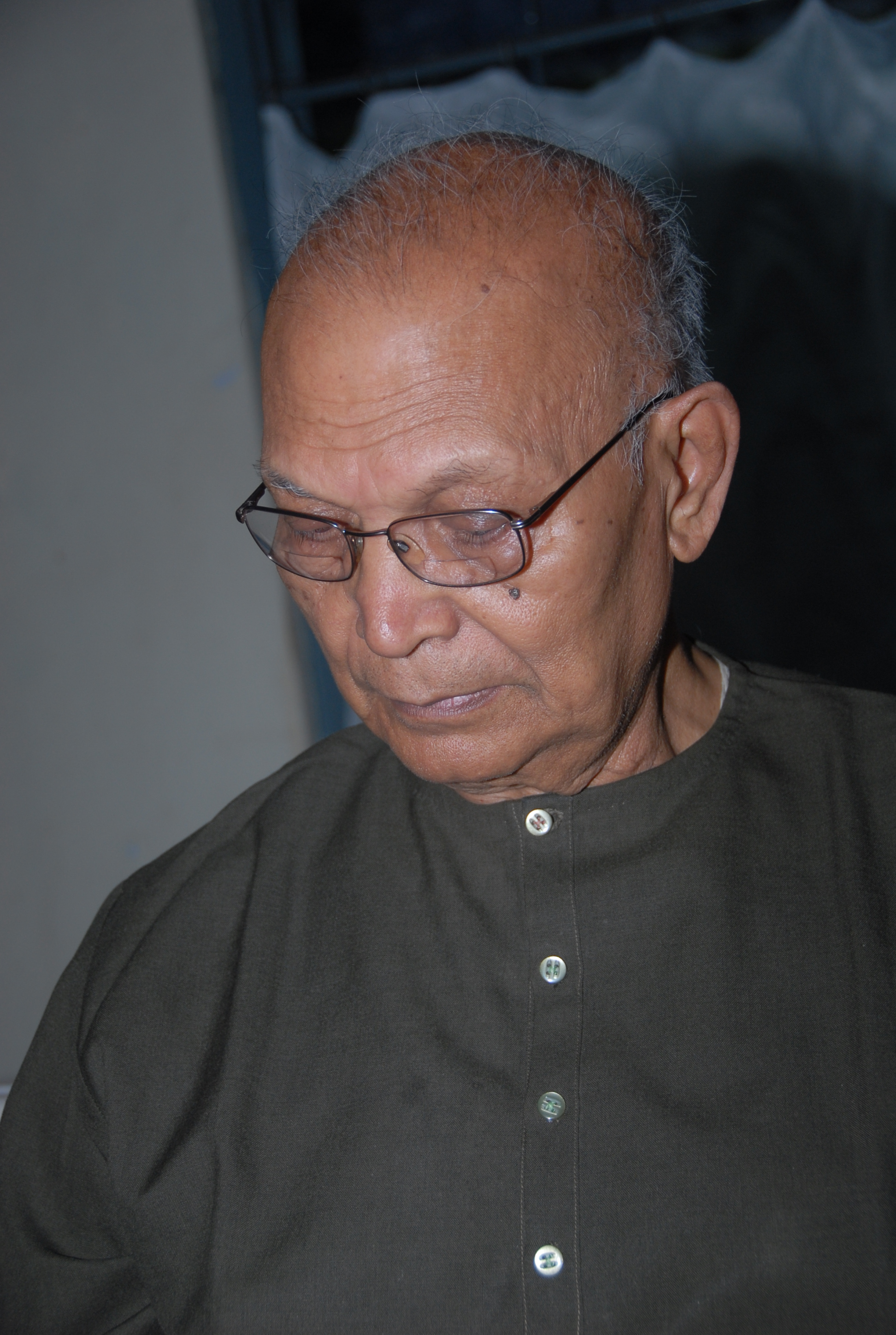
- Born: 17 October 1929 (Kumar Purnima); Odisha
- Died: 9 February 2018 (89)
- Education: University of Lucknow
- Occupation: Literature
- Awards: Padma Shri

Chandrasekhar Rath was an Indian Odia litterateur. In 2018, he was nominated for Padma Shri but could not receive it due to death.

== Early life and education ==
Rath was from Malpada village in Balangir district. He did his graduation from Rajendra college. He did Post-graduation in English from the University of Lucknow in 1952.

== Career ==
Rath joined the Odisha Education Service in 1952 as lecturer in English and also served as Secretary of Test Book Bureau before retiring as Deputy Director Public Instruction (DPI) in 1987. He has written 14 short story collections, 15 essay books, devotional essays and three novels.

== Novels ==
- Yantrarudha (The Instrumented) in 1967
- Asurya Upanivesh (The Sunless Colony) in 1974
- Nav Jatak (Regenesis) in 1981.

== Awards ==
- Padma Shri
- Sahitya Akademi Award in 1997
- Hutch Crossword Book Award
- Kendra Sahitya Akademi Award
- Odisha Sahitya Akademi Award
- Atibadi Jagannath Das Samman

== Death ==
Rath died on 9 February 2018 at the age of 89. He was survived by his wife, three daughters and a son.
