= Mamata Dash =

Odia writer from India

- Born: Mamata Mohapatra; 4 October 1947 (age 79); Jagatsinghpur, India
- Education: Utkal University (B.A.)
- Writing career
- Language: Odia
- Notable awards: Odisha Sahitya Academy Award

Mamata Dash (nee Mohapatra; born 4 October 1947) is an Odia poet, writer and translator. She was awarded the Odisha Sahitya Academy Award for her poetry collection Ekatra Chandrasurya.

== Early life ==
Dash was born on 4 October 1947 at Jagatsinghpur. Her father Ramachandra Mohapatra was a doctor. Her mother was Pankajmala. She had four sisters and three brothers. Her early education came at Jagatsinghpur before she moved to Ravenshaw Girls School, Cuttack. She started writing at the age of nine.

== Works ==
=== Poetry collections ===
- Naimisharanya
- Ekatra chandrasurjya
- Abak svarga (in Odia). Kataka Shtudentas Shtora. 1989. OCLC 24504041.
- Nila Nirbapana
- Hiranyabarna
- Shubhradhara
- Mayandhakara
- Ujjwala Upabana
- Kabita Samagra(1st part)
- Raaga Lalita
- Shunya chitrayana

=== Stories ===
- Anya Jagatara Sakala
- Antarala Drushya
- Arundhatira sandhya
- Padma Purusha

=== Essays ===
- Ama Sahityare Shriradha bilasa
- Atikramana
- Aneka jharaka

=== Novels ===
- Kehi Jane bishakha

=== English ===
- A moment beyond time
- Maker's of Indian literature -Bhubanaswara Behera

=== Translation ===
- Prathama Aloka
- Bohu Thakuranira Hats
- Chetanara Abhiyatra
- Bharatara punarjanma
- Shri Ma nka Agenda

== Recognition ==
- Odisha Sahitya Academy Award, 1987
- Bhanuji Rao Award from Gangadhara Rath foundation
- Bharata Naik Smriti Sammana from Sambalpur University, Odisha
- Bishuba Sammana
- Bharatiya Bhasa Parishada Award
- Kalindi Charan smruti sammana
- Sachi Rautray sammana
- Sammana from Dharitri, Istahaar, Lekhaka samukhya, nilakain, Phakir Morgan Sahitya Sansada
- Fellowship from Government of India (Department of culture)
