= Ramesh Chandra Bhanja =

- Born: 17 April 1940; Haladia, Khordha
- Died: 18 March 2015 (aged 74); Khordha, India
- Education: M.A.(Odia), B.Ed.
- Alma mater: Christ College; Ravenshaw College, Cuttack
- Occupations: Teacher & Teacher educator
- Employer: Govt. of Odisha
- Known for: Children Literature, Teacher
- Notable work: Gapa Ganthili
- Style: Lyrical Poems & Stories for young readers/audience
- Spouse: Binodinee Bhanja
- Children: 3 Sons, 2 Daughters
- Awards: Odisha Sahitya Academy Award, 1982

Ramesh Chandra Bhanja (17 April 1940 – 18 March 2015) was a writer, teacher, educationist, linguist, historian, editor and dramatist from Odisha. He has written many short-stories & poetry collections for children of all age groups. For his book Gapa Ganthili (short story compilation), he received the Odisha Sahitya Academy Award.

== Early life and family ==
Ramesh Chandra Bhanja was born in a Kshatriya family in Garh Haladia village in Khordha district (erstwhile Puri district). He belongs to the lineage of Bhanj dynasty who were erstwhile rulers of Ghumusara (Ganjam district), Kendujhar (Keonjhar district) and Baripada (Mayurbhanj district). Kavi Samrat Upendra Bhanja is also his ancestor. His own family consists of his wife, 3 sons and 2 daughters.

Bhanja's early education (primary schooling) started in his native village Garh Haladia. After the Middle English (ମାଇନର୍‌) level, he left for Banki (in Cuttack district) for his high school education. After high school, he moved to Cuttack for college education. There too he started his early professional career.

== Books ==
- Kathi Kuta Patara (Poem Collection), April 1980
- Bheri Toori Mahuri (Poem Collection), April 1980
- Gapa Ganthili (Story collection), January 1981
- Katha Kothali (Story Collection), December 1981
- Muthaey Mahak (Story collection), December 1982
- Katha Kahuchi Suna (Story Collection), October 2013

== Awards and honors ==
- Odisha Sahitya Academy Award (Bhubaneshwar), 1982
- Vishub Puraskar (by Prajatantra Prachar Samity, Cuttack), 2003
- Odia Children's Literature Award (by Kala Vikash Kendra, Cuttack),
- Khadi & Gamyodyog Literature Award (by Odisha Khadi & Gamyodyog Board, Bhubaneshwar),
- Harekrishna Shishu Sahitya Puraskar by Fakir Mohan Sahitya Parisshad (Baleshwar), 1996
- Jnana Jyoti Puraskar by Koradha Vishuv Milan (Khordha), 2011
- Bhubaneswar Pustak Mela Puraskar for Children's Literature (for the book KathA Kahuchi SuNa : କଥା କହୁଛି ଶୁଣ), 2014
