= Nityananda Mahapatra =

Indian politician

Member of Odisha Legislative Assembly
- In office 1957–1971
- Preceded by: Mahamad Hanif
- Succeeded by: Harekrushna Mahatab
- Constituency: Bhadrak

Personal details
- Born: 17 June 1912 Bhadrak, Bihar and Orissa Province, British India
- Died: 17 April 2012 (aged 99) Bhubaneswar, Odisha, India
- Party: Orissa Jana Congress
- Occupation: Writer, politician
- Awards: Sahitya Akademi Award,1987
- Writing career
- Notable work: Gharadiha

Nityananda Mahapatra (17 June 1912 – 17 April 2012) was an Indian Odia politician, poet and journalist.

== Political career ==
He was imprisoned three times by the British Raj between 1930 and 1942 for nationalist activities. He came to literary prominence as editor of the Odia magazine Dagara, and as a short story writer after independence. In his political career Mohapatra served as a member of the Odisha Legislative Assembly from 1957 to 1971 and as state Minister of Supply and Cultural Affairs from 1967 to 1971.

== Death ==
He died on 17 April 2012 at Kharavelanagar, Bhubaneswar, Odisha, from old age-related ailments. He was two months short of his 100th birthday.

== Literary works ==
Mohapatra has translated the Ramavataram (also known as the Kamba Ramayanam), the Tamil version of the Ramayana, into Odia. Other works that he translated into Odia include Ramana Maharshee and Swarajya Sanghitaa.

== Literary awards ==
Mahapatra received the Odisha Sahitya Academy Award in 1974 and the Kendra Sahitya Akademi Award in 1987 for his novel Gharadiha.
