= Chakhi Khuntia =

Jagannath Temple priest and poet (1827–1870)

- Chandan Hajuri
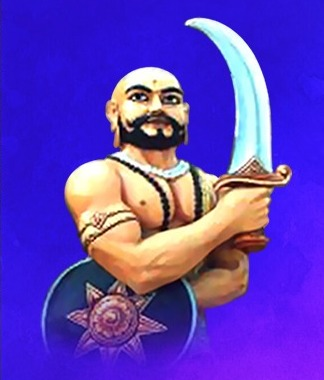
- Born: 20 January 1827; Puri
- Died: 1870 (aged 42–43); Puri

Chandan Hajuri (20 January 1827 – 1870) popularly known as 'Chakhi Khuntia' was a Jagannath Temple priest and a poet who participated in the Indian Rebellion of 1857.

== Life ==
Chandan Hajuri was born on the auspicious day of Samba Dashami in the year 1827 which fell on 7 January 1827 in Puri of Odisha in an Utkal brahmin family to father Raghunath Khuntia alias Bhimasen Hajuri and mother Kamalabati. He was married to Sundarmani at the Age of 12. At a young age, he was taught Odia, Sanskrit and Hindi literature to help him perform his duties in the Jagannath temple. He also learned traditional wrestling at Akharas and later, taught Wrestling and military exercises to the youths in Puri.

== 1857 Rebellion ==
Chakhi Khuntia happened to be the family priest of Manubai, later renamed Lakshmibai after her marriage to Gangadhar Rao, the King of Jhansi. He played a crucial role in mobilizing the sepoys and organizing mutiny while traveling across the country as a Panda of the Jagannath Temple before the Indian Rebellion of 1857. At the time of the mutiny, he was stationed at a Northern Military Station and fought valiantly with the British. He was known to have maintained a direct contact with the rebel leadership during the Mutiny. Later, he was arrested in Gaya and his properties were confiscated by the East Indian Company Government. In 1858, Hajuri was released from prison after being offered amnesty under the Queen's proclamation of 1858 along with other Rebels.

== Later life ==
Khuntia spent the remainder of his life at Puri by devoting himself to spiritual and literary pursuits. He composed several popular Poems and Songs dedicated to Lord Jagannath. He also composed a palm life manuscript titled Manubai in memory of Lakshmibai. He died in 1870 at Puri.
