= Bidyut Prabha Devi =

Indian poet (1926–1977)

Bidyut Prabha Devi (12 July 1926 – 28 January 1977) was an Odia poet from India. She is recognized as one of the best female poets in Odia literature.

== Biography ==
Bidyut Prabha was born on 12 July 1926 at her maternal uncle's home in a small village named Natara in the district of Kendrapara in a Karan family . She was the second daughter of Nimai Charan Das, a writer and compiler, and Rekha Devi. Her parents, being a traditionalists and conservatives, lived in Bamphisahi of Cuttack city. Bidyut Prabha had a brother and three sisters; her younger sister Punya Prabha Devi is also a writer.

She started writing poems under the inspiration of her father, Nimai Charan Das. In her childhood, she got herself acquainted with several major Odia poets.

On 4 July 1949, she married Panchanan Mohanty, an employee of Orissa secretariat.

She suffered from poor health during 1966, and indulged towards spirituality and moved to Sri Aurobindo Ashram. On 28 January 1977, her declining health led her to jump in front of a train.

== Works ==
Bidyut Prabha started writing poems from 1940 and subsequently her poems were published in literary magazines, with her elder sister Basanti who had written some poems. She published her first collection of poems Sabita in 1944, which has mostly patriotic poems relating to the glory and grandeur of the land of Orissa.

Though educated in urban area, her poems reflects memory of rural life of her childhood. Considerably influenced by two Odia poets, Nanda Kishore Bal and Kunja Bihari Das, her poems deal with the problem of women that exist in an age-old conservative society. She also wrote plays and some children's literature. Her complete works of poems was published as Bidyutprabha Sanchayan in 1957.

=== Collection of poems ===
- Sabita (1947)
- Utkal Saraswata Prativa (1947)
- Kanakanjali (1948)
- Marichika (1948)
- Bihayasi (1949)
- Bandenika (1950)
- Swapnadeep (1951)
- Jhara Siuli (1957)
- Jahaku Jie (1957)

== Recognition ==
In 1950, Bidyut Prabha's book Utkal Saraswata was prescribed as a poetry text book by Utkal University for high school students. Bidyutprabha Devi is recognized as one of the major female poets in Odia literature. Her collection of poems Bidyutprabha Sanchayana won the Odisha Sahitya Academy Award in 1962.
