= Arts of Odisha =

Arts and crafts in the Indian state of Odisha, due to the reign of many different rulers in the past, underwent many changes and encompass traditional handicrafts, painting and carving, dance and music, clothing, and other forms.

== Dance and music ==
=== Others ===
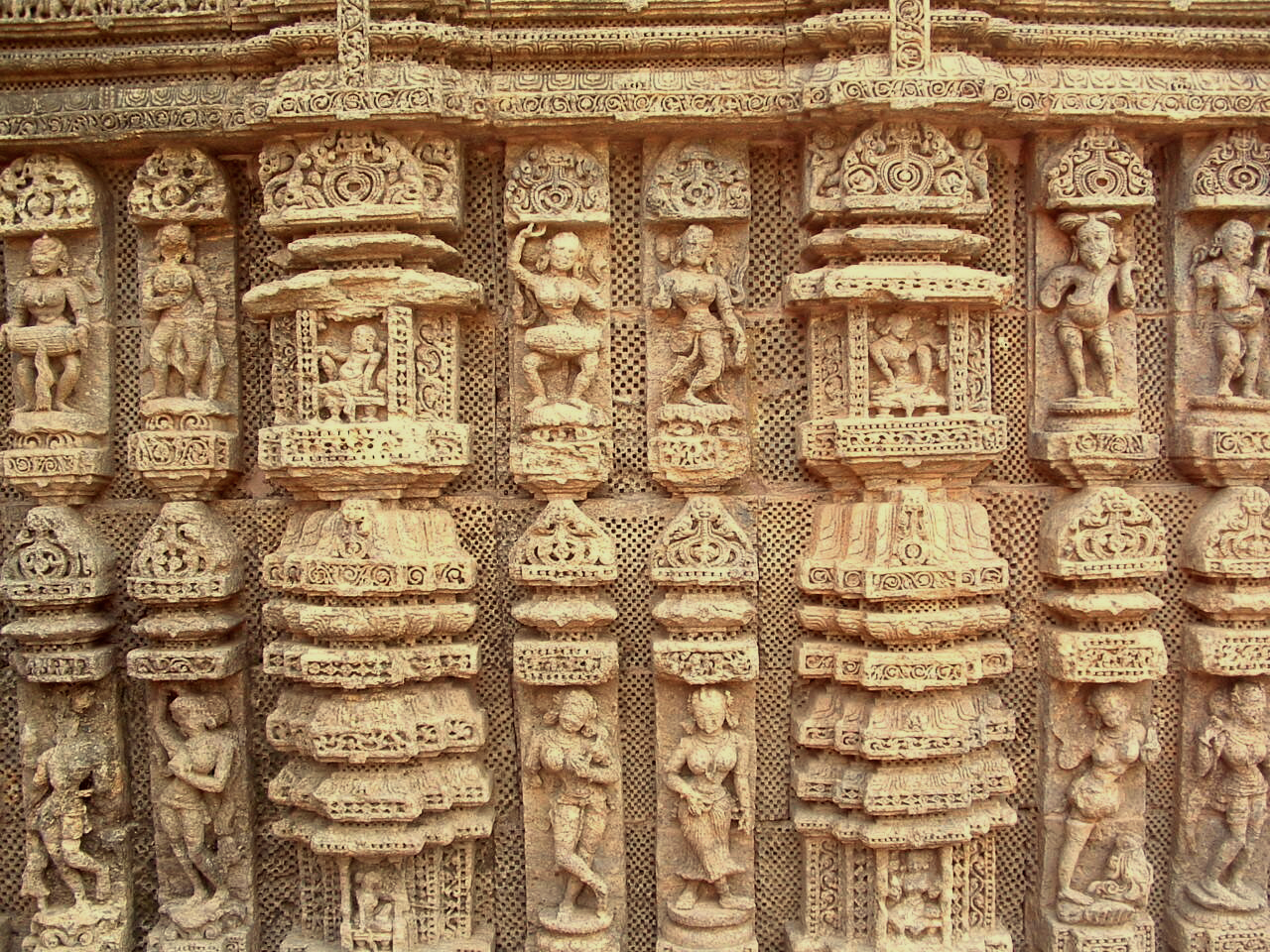
Stone carving, Konark Sun Temple

Aside from the Odissi dance there are many other forms of dance and folk performances in Odisha. These include Baunsa Rani, Chaiti Ghoda, Changu Nata, Chhau, Dalkhai, Danda Nata, Pala, Dasakathia, Dhanu Jatra, Ghanta Patua, Ghumura, Karma Naach, Kathinacha, Kedu, Kela Keluni, Laudi Khela, Gopalila Medha Nacha, Naga Dance, Paika Nrutya, Jatra, Patua Jatra, Puppet Dance, Ranappa and Samprada.

=== Music ===
The 16th century witnessed the compilation of literature within music. The four important treatises written during that time are Sangitamava Chandrika, Natya Manorama, Sangita Kalalata and Gita Prakasha. Orissi music is a combination of four distinctive kinds of music, namely, Chitrapada, Dhruvapada, Panchal and Chitrakala. When music uses artwork, it is known as Chitikala. A unique feature of Oriya music is the Padi, which consists of singing of words in a fast beat.

Orissi music is more than two thousand five hundred years old and comprises a number of categories. Of these, the five broad ones are Tribal Music, Folk music, Light Music, Light-Classical Music and Classical Music. Anyone who is trying to understand the culture of Odisha must take into account its music, which essentially forms a part of its legacy.

In the ancient times, there were saint-poets who wrote the lyrics of poems and songs that were sung to rouse the religious feelings of people. It was by the 11th century that the music of Odisha, in the form of Triswari, Chatuhswari, and Panchaswari, underwent transformation and was converted into the classical style.

== Handicrafts ==
Major handicrafts in Odisha include applique work, brass and bell metal, silver filigree and stone carving. Other forms include Lacquer, Papier Mache, and tribal combs, handlooms and wood and traditional stone carving.

== Painting ==
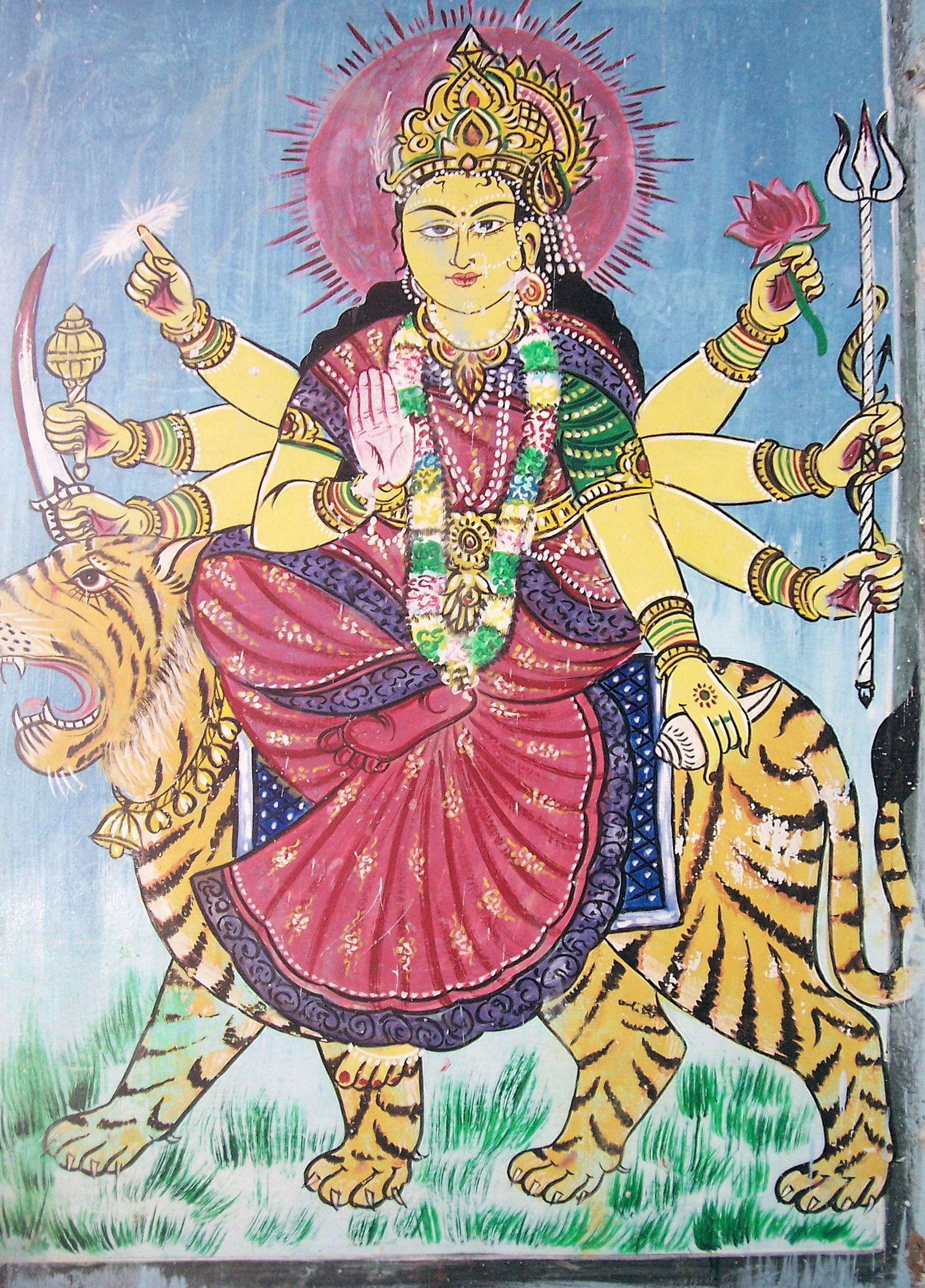

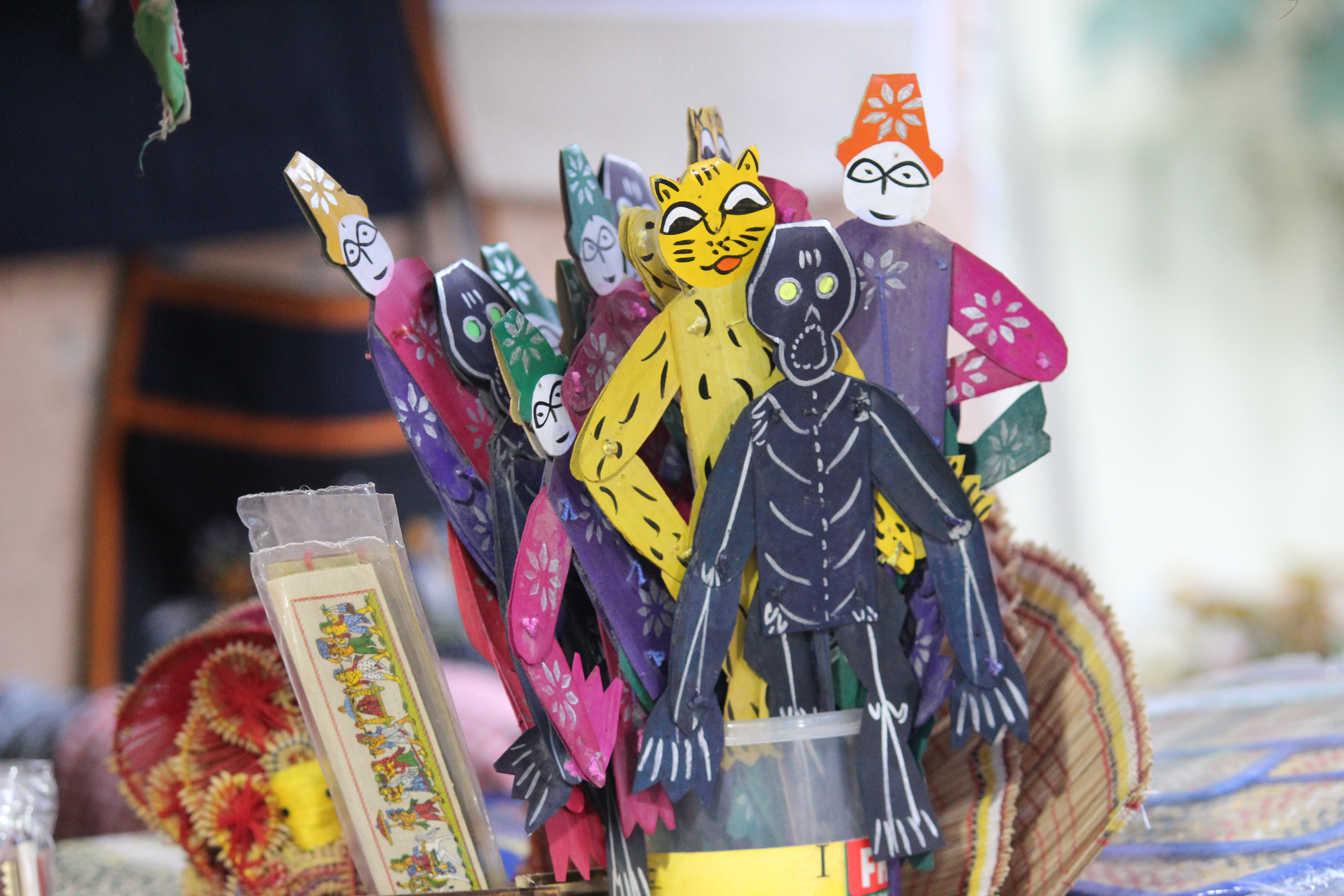
Tala pateri

The history of painting in Odisha dated back to ancient times with rock-shelter paintings, some of which are dated to the early historic period (300 BC – 100 AD). Apart from the rock painting sites, there are several drawings and etching resembling figures on rock surfaces at Digapahandi and Berhampur in Ganjam district and other places. Many of the cave paintings are tribal and rock shelter painting has continued through the centuries as an Oriya tradition. They are often of a decorative nature mixed with rituals and may contain several motifs. Mural paintings in Odisha as elsewhere in India was an ancient tradition and evidence of mural pigment coatings have been found in the caves of Khandagiri and Udayagiri dating back to the reign of Emperor Kharavela who ruled in the 1st century B.C.

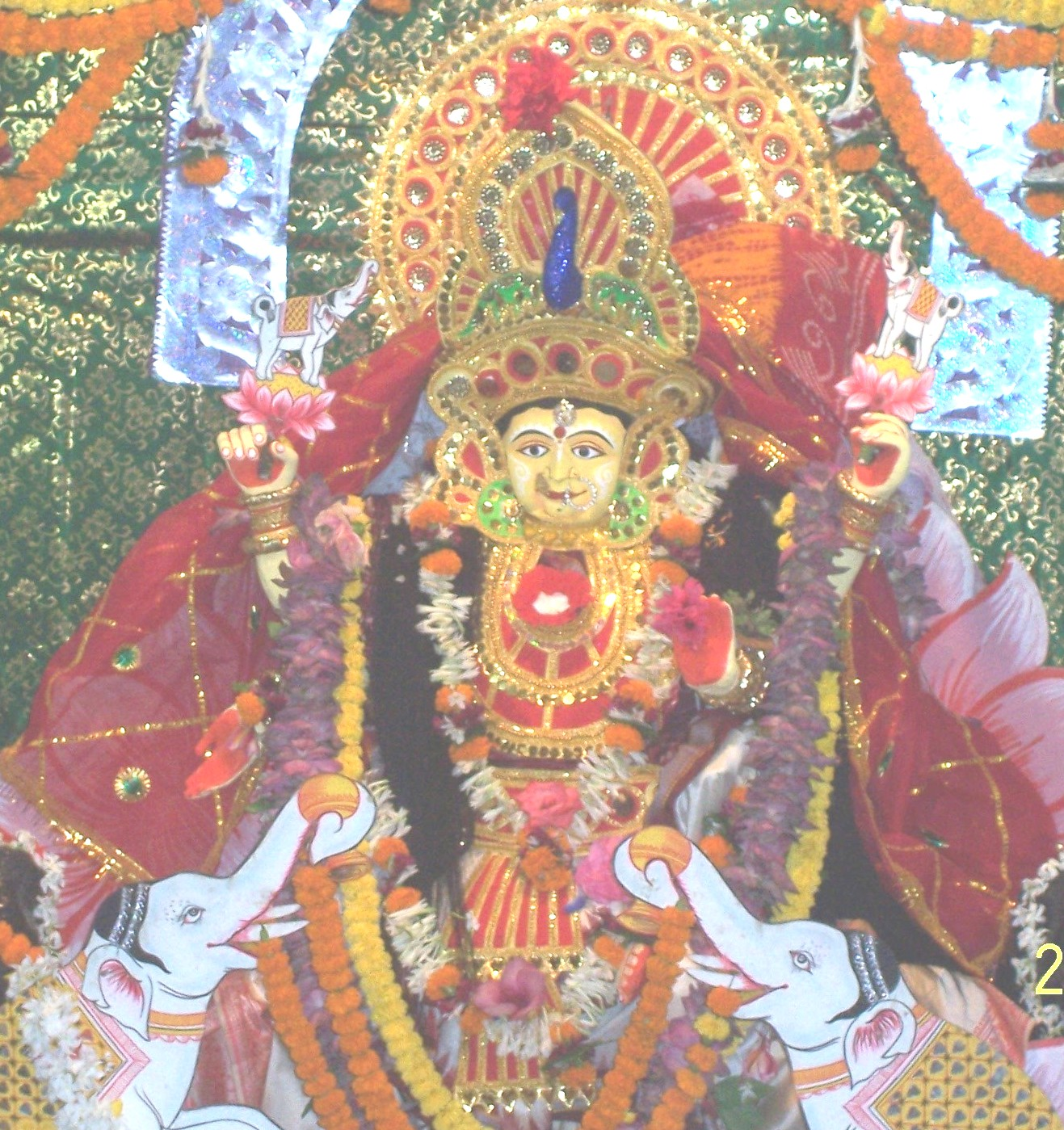

On the boulder of Ravanachhaya at Sitabhinji Group of Rock Shelters in Keonjhar district is a mural belonging to later Gupta period and shows resemblance to those of the Ajanta style. From the period of 1600 to present murals were painted in the numerous templates of Odisha depicting sacred figures such as the painting of Buddha Vijaya in the Jagamohana of Lakshmi Temple and inside the Jagannath Temple at Puri, the Biranchinarayana Temple, in Buguda, Ganjam district and so on.

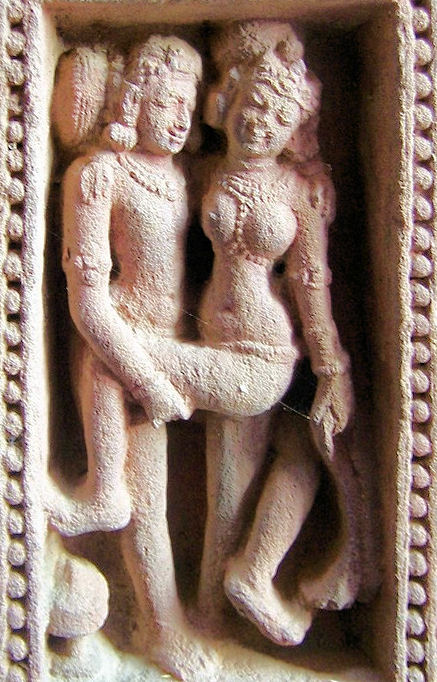
Erotic sculpture in Mukteswar Temple

Pata painting is considered an important form of Oriya painting which originated from the temple of Jagannath at Puri in the 12th century. This style developed under the patronage of the Ganga kings, and the kings of Bhoi dynasty. The purpose of the pata painting was to popularise the cult of Jagannath to the millions of pilgrims visiting Puri. The pata paintings may, however, take a number of forms and may range from masks to even toys and models.

=== Structural art ===
The Jagannatha Temple in Puri, is also known for its applique artwork of Pipili, silver filigree ornamental works from Cuttack, the Pattachitras (palm leaf paintings), famous stone utensils of Nilgiri (Balasore) and various tribal influenced cultures. The Sun temple at Konark is famous for its architectural splendour while the "Sambalpuri textiles", especially the Sambalpuri Saree, equals it in its artistic grandeur. The different colors and varieties of sarees in Odisha make them very popular among the women of the state. The handloom sarees available in Odisha can be of four major types; these are Ikat, Bandha, Bomkai, and Pasapalli. Odisha sarees are also available in other colors like cream, maroon, brown and rust. The tie-and-dye technique used by the weavers of Odisha to create motifs on these sarees is unique to this region. This technique also gives the sarees of Odisha an identity of their own.

=== Sand Art ===
In Odisha, sand art is a unique type of art form developed in Puri
