= Natabara Samantaray =

Odia writer and literary critic (1918–2000)

- Occupations: Writer, Critics
- Writing career
- Language: Odia
- Notable works: Odia Sahityara Itihasa (1803-1920); Adhunika Odia Sahityara Bhittibhumi

Natabara Samantaray was an Odia writer and literary critic. Some of his known literary historical works are Odia Sahityara Itihasa (1803-1920), Adhunika Odia Sahityara Bhittibhumi and Vyasakabi Fakirmohan. His critical review included works of many noted Odia authors like Fakir Mohan Senapati and Radhanath Ray. His historical research includes all of the major Odia writings published during 1803 until 1920 which accentuate the British Raj and its impact in coastal Odisha, and a critical analysis of the modern Odia literature.

== Notable works ==
- Odia Sahityara Itihasa (1803-1920) (1964)
- Vyasakabi Fakirmohan (1957)
- Fakirmohan Sahitya Samiksha (1984)
- Kabyasrshti Manasa (1999)
- Radhanatha Rachanabali O Semananka Prakasa Samaya Nirnaya (The Dagara, XXIV, 6th and 7th number, 1960–61, p. 5)
- Radhanatha Sahitya Samikha Eka Adhayana (The Jhankar, VIII, 11th number, February 1957, p. 1062)
- Juga Prabarttak Radhanath

== Research books ==
- Byasakabi Fakirmohan - 1957 (Odisha Sahitya Academy Award)
- Adhunika Odia Sahityara Digdarshan - 1859
- Odia Vaishnava Sahitya - 1959
- Jugaprabartaka Srasta Radhanath - 1960 (Odisha Sahitya Academy Award)
- Gangadhara Sahitya Samikshya - 1960
- Sahityadarsha - 1960
- Radhanath O Chilika Kabya - 1960
- Galpa Nuhen Samalochana - 1963
- Odia Sahityara Itihasa (1803-1920) - 1963 (Ph.D Thesis)
- Adhunika Odia Sahityara Bhittibhumi - 1964
- Nandakishor Sahitya Samikhya - 1964
- Odia Palli Sahitya - 1970
- Odia Sahityaku Artaballavanka Dana - 1970
- Badajena Sahitya Samokhya - 1971
- Sakhahina Pancha Sakha - 1975
- Mu Kipari Gabeshana Kali - 1976
- Odia Sahityara Swara Paribartana - 1976
- Odia Sahityara Kala O Kala - 1977
- Odia Sahityare Samikhya O Sangraha - 1977
- Adhunika Odia Sahiya Bikashara Prusthabhumi - 1979
- Odishara Dharmadharare Panchasakha Parikalpana - 1982
- Radhanath Sahitya Samikhya - 1984
- Fakirmohan Sahitya Samikhya - 1984
- Kabi Gopabandhunka Kabya Srusti Manasa: Eka Sarvekshana - 1999

== After Death Publication ==
- Odia Bhasa Bilopa Andolana Ed. Dr. Smaran Kumar Nayak, Published by Jagannath Ratha, Binod Bihari, Cuttack, Odisha, India.

== Awards ==
- Atibadi Jagannath Das Award (1995)
- Odisha Sahitya Academy Award (1957-1958) for Vyasakabi Fakir Mohan
- Odisha Sahitya Academy Award (1959-1961) for Juga Prabarttak Radhanath
- Sarala Award
