= Tarun Kanti Mishra =

Indian author (born 1950)

- Born: 2 August 1950 (age 76); Kendujhar
- Citizenship: Indian
- Education: Buxi Jagabandhu Bidyadhar College, Ravenshaw College
- Occupation: Administrator
- Relatives: Arun Kanti Mishra
- Writing career
- Notable awards: Central Sahitya Akademi Award, Odisha Sahitya Academy Award, Sarala Award
- Website: tarunkantimishra.in

Tarun Kanti Mishra (born 2 August 1950) is an Indian Odia story writer. More than 15 of his books have been published. He got the Central Sahitya Akademi Award, Odisha Sahitya Academy award and Sarala Award for his contribution in literature and was an IAS in the profession and retired after being head of the administration department of Odisha. Then he also worked as Chief Information Commissioner of Odisha.

== Life ==
Tarun Kanti was born in 1950, in Kendujhar district. He did his schooling in Puri Zilla School and P.M. Academy, Cuttack. He completed graduation from Buxi Jagabandhu Bidyadhar College in Economics and post graduation in Applied Economics from Utkal University. He also holds an MA degree from the University of East Anglia.

He wished to become a teacher, but joined administrative service to meet family expectations. He joined the Indian Administrative Service in 1975. After being in administrative positions in various Government of Odisha departments, he became head of the state administration in August 2009. He retired in August 2010. Government of Odisha appointed him as State Information Commissioner in November 2010. He relinquished this office in 2015.

== Literature life ==
Tarun Kanti Mishra's first story Hey Pruthibira Naagarika was published in the reputed literary magazine Aasantaakaali at the age of fourteen. His first anthology of short stories was published in 1968 while studying BJB College, Bhubaneswar. He has published18 anthologies and one novel. Many of his works have been translated into Hindi, Bengali, Urdu, Telugu, Malayalam, Marathi, Gujarati, and English. He authored a novel against the backdrop of Dandakaranya, a vast territory inhabited by immigrants of erstwhile East Pakistan and a large tribal population.

=== Works ===
- Aabrtara Duiti Swara
- Nisangatara Swara
- Komala Gandhaara
- Bahubrihi
- Paaraadise Pakhi
- Jane Nirastra Attatayi
- Bitansa
- Prajaapatira Denaa Naahi
- Aakasha Setu
- Lubdhakara Raati
- Aji Ratir Galpa
- Bhaswati
- Kehi Jane Eka Eka
- Ajana tithi ra janha

== Honours and awards ==
- Kendra Sahitya Akademi Award, 2019
- Odisha Sahitya Academy Award - 1997
- Sarala Award 2001.
- Katha Award, New Delhi.
- Think Orissa Leadership Award - 2009
- D.Litt. (North Odisha University)
