= Ratnakar Chaini =

Indian academic (1945–2020)

- Born: 25 August 1945; Cuttack, Orissa Province, British India
- Died: 18 April 2020 (aged 74); Cuttack, Odisha, India
- Education: Ravenshaw College, Utkal University
- Occupation: Playwright,
- Writing career
- Notable awards: Odisha Sahitya Akademi award (1977)

Signature
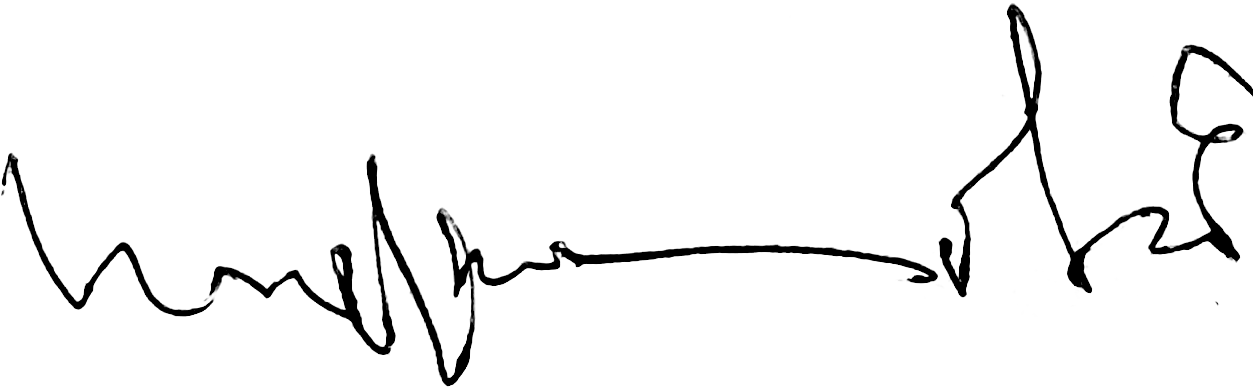

Ratnakar Chaini (25 Aug 1945 – 18 April 2020) was an Indian writer and academic. He was known for his works in Odia. Born in Cuttack, he served as the president of "Sanskar Bharti", and as president of the Utkal Sahitya Samaj in 2010. Some of his notable writings are Santha Kabi Achyutananda, Niraba Kolahala, Kabi Gopalkrushna, Asha brundabana, Achyatananda gitabali, Ajira galpa, Surjyastra upabana, and Kaha Lalita.

Chaini completed his matriculation from Nemal High School. Then went to do his graduation from Christ College Cuttack. He completed his post-graduation in Ravenshaw College and PhD from Utkal University in 1978. In 1979 started his job as a lecturer and taught in various Government colleges of Odisha to finally retire as the Hod from Sailabala Women's College, Cuttack .
