= Faturananda =

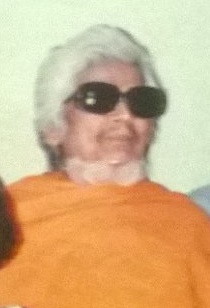
- Faturananda at Rourkela
- Born: Rāmachandra Mishra; 1 June 1915; Cuttack, Orissa Province, British India
- Died: 6 November 1995 (aged 80)
- Parent(s): Bidyādhar Mishra; Subhadrā Mishra

Rāmachandra Mishra (1 June 1915–6 November 1995), better known by his pen name Faturananda, was an Indian humorist and satirical writer in Odia. He was the founder of the Sarasa Sāhitya Samiti, a literary organisation. Mishra established "Kāntakabi Award" in the name of Laxmikanta Mohapatra. His early life was spent in struggling which is the core part of his autobiography Mo phutā dangāra kāhāni. Mishra preferred "Faturānanda" as a pen name in all his writings. Some of his popular writings include Nākatā Chitrakar (1953), Sāhi Mahābharat. His satirical writings in Odia were based on political reality and prevailing cynicism.

== Early life ==
Mishra was born on 1 June 1915 in Cuttack, Odisha to Bidyādhar Mishra and Subhadrā Mishra.

== Literary career ==
Faturānanda is well known for his distinctly unique and original style of writing. He uses simple and colloquial language with a natural flow. Underlying theme in all his works is social issues addressed either directly or indirectly.

According to Faturānanda “Stories I wrote initially were of tragic nature. After publication of “Dagaro” from Cuttack I started noticing the comic and humorous stories in it. Those were more or less of the same plot. For example, romance between a college boy and a college girl. Both decide to get married, but face some obstacle just before it. Finally the end of their romance. After seeing the same situation in all these published stories, I said – can’t there be any humor without these college boys and college girls. I made up my mind then and there not to ever include romance in my humor and satire. I have followed this principle ever since."

== Awards and recognitions ==
- Orissā Sāhitya Academy
- Saralā Puraskār, Bhubaneswar
- Jadumani Sāhitya Sansada, Nayāgada
- Rādhānātha Pāthāgara, Sora, Bāleswar
- Saralā Sāhitya Sansada, Cuttack
- Utkal Pāthaka Sansada, Cuttack
- Nāgarika Sambardhanā, Rourkela

== Bibliography ==
=== Autobiography ===
- Mo Phutā Dangāra Kāhāni, 1989

=== Novel ===
- Nākatā Chitrakar, 1953

=== Lyrical poem ===
- Sāhi Mahābhārata, 1987

=== Story collections ===
- Heresā, 1959
- Sāhitya Chāsa, 1959
- Bidushaka, 1963
- Mangalabāria Sāhitya Sansada, 1963
- Hasakurā, 1972
- Bruhat Bhānda, 1977
- Amruta Behiā, 1977
- Vote, 1980
- Gamāt, 1982
- Nidābehel, 1982
- Sāhitya Beushana, 1983
- Nabajiā, 1983
- Thatalibāj, 1983
- Sāhitya Bachābachi, 1983
- Maskarā, 1984
- Tāhuliā 1985
- Tāpuriā, 1986
- Muchukundiā, 1990
- Khilikhiliā, 1993
- Odishāra Spin Bowler, 1994

=== Poetry ===
- Nilathā Kabi, 1955

=== Play ===
- Kalikati Chenka, 1984

=== Children's literature ===
- Ajagabi Sikāra
- Nālura Chandra Yātra, 1991

=== Translations ===
- Ādarsha Hindu Hotel, 1977 - By Bibhutibhushana Chattopādyāya
- Bhāratara Shrestha Hāsyagalpa, 1980 - By Mujtabā Hossein

=== Other ===
- Famālochanā, 1987
- Faturānandanka Dusprāpya Rachanā, 1999
