= Mohapatra Nilamani Sahoo =

Odia writer

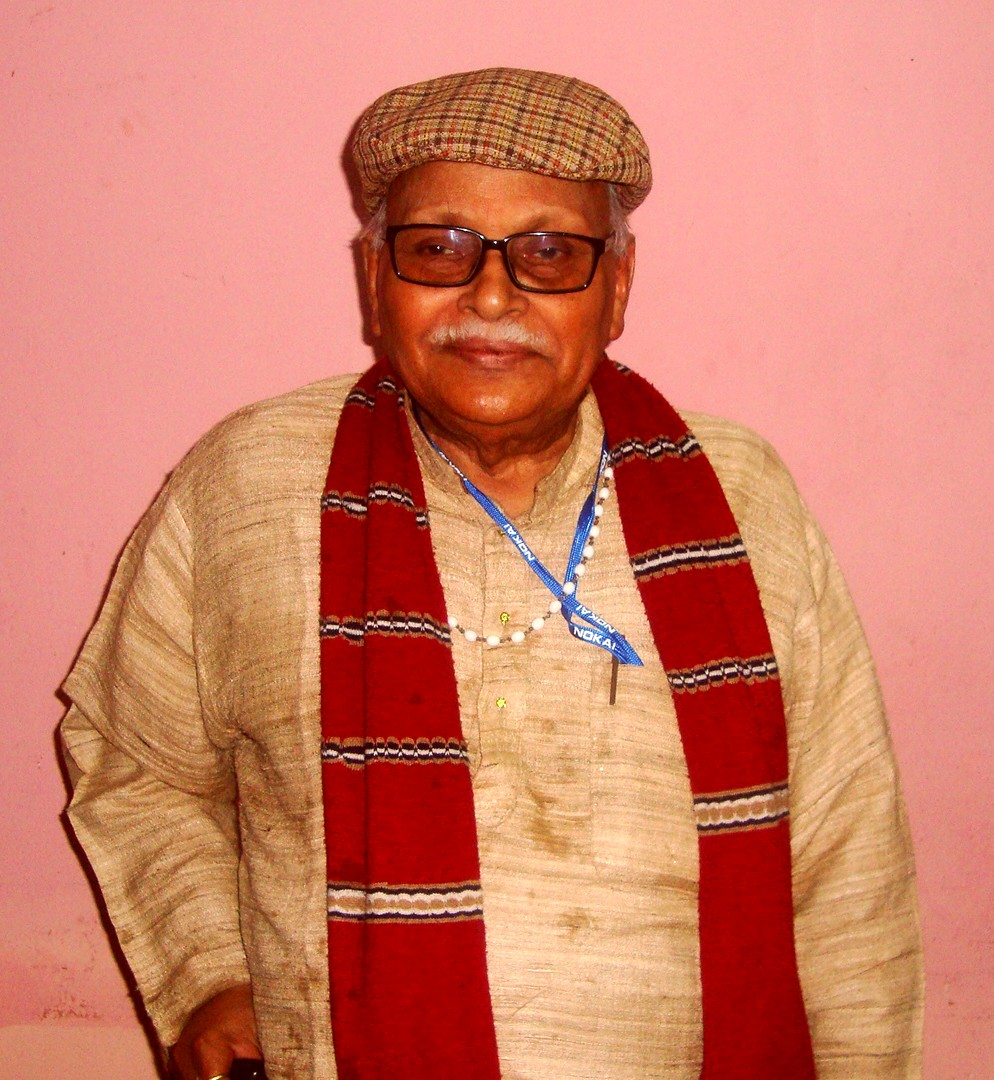
- Mohapatra Nilamani Sahoo in 2012
- Born: 22 December 1926; Niali, Cuttack, Odisha, India
- Died: 25 June 2016 (aged 89); Bhubaneswar, Odisha, India
- Occupation: Writer
- Notable work: Akasha Patala; Abhisapta Gandharba
- Spouse: Prasanna Kumari Devi
- Children: Guruprasad Mohapatra

Signature
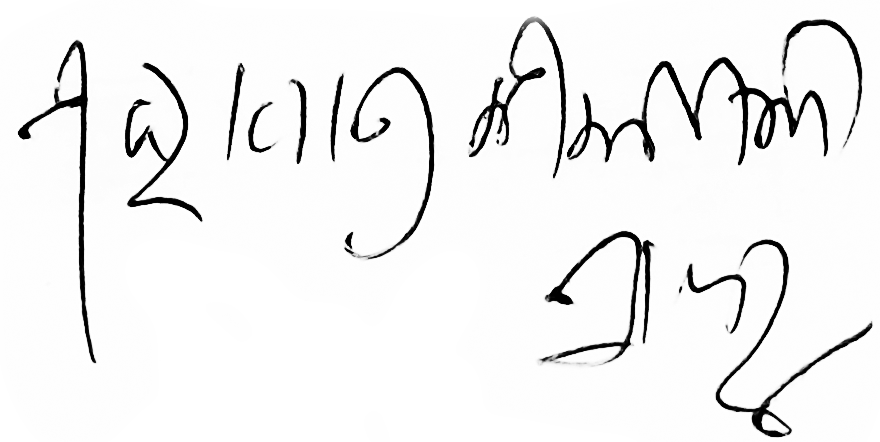

Mohapatra Nilamani Sahoo (22 December 1926 – 25 June 2016), surname also spelt Sahu, was an Indian Odia language short story writer. He received several literary awards over his career, including the 1979 Odisha Sahitya Academy Award for Akasha Patala, and the 1983 Sarala Award and the 1984 Sahitya Akademi Award in Odia, for Abhisapta Gandharba. Sahoo died on 25 June 2016 after multiple organ failures.

== Life and career ==
Sahoo was born on 22 December 1926 in the town Niali of the Cuttack district in a wealthy zamindar family. He studied and completed matriculation at the Binjharpur High School and later went on to finish his graduation and post-graduation in Odia at the Ravenshaw College at Cuttack. After post-graduation, Sahoo took the job of librarian at the Sambalpur University where he continued for two years. Later he took the post of lecturer of Odia at the Bhadrak College, followed by Paralakhemundi Government College at Gajapati. Sahoo became vice-principal and later principal of the BJB Evening College at Bhubaneshwar.

== Literary works and awards ==
Sahoo wrote various short stories in Odia language. His popular works include Prema Tribhuja (1952), Michha Bagha (1955), Srunantu Sarbe Amrutasya Putra (1957), Ganjei O’ Gabesana (1961), Andha Ratira Surya (1965) and more. He also published novel; Dhara O Dhara, Tamasi Radha and Hansa Mithuna. Sahoo also wrote one-act and children's plays. His 1979 book Akasha Patala (literally "Heaven and Hell") won him the Odisha Sahitya Academy Award. The short story compilation Abhisapta Gandharba (literally "The Cursed Gandharva") received the Sarala Award in 1983, followed by a Sahitya Akademi Award for Odia in 1984. The book was translated into Hindi by Siddharth Mansingh Mahapatra in 1992.

From 1965 to 1969, Sahoo edited and wrote for the magazine Jhankara. He was also the editor of other periodicals such as Utkala Prasanga and Orissa Review from 1975 to 1978. In Jhankara, he often wrote on philosophies of Sri Aurobindo. He translated Aurobindo's Savitri: A Legend and a Symbol and delivered lectures on Aurobindo, Ramakrishna Paramhansa and Swami Vivekananda.

Sahoo was the recipient of the Kanta Kabi Award in 2001, the Sahitya Bharati Award in 2006, and the Utkal Ratna Award in 2013. His stories described the subtleties of human emotion and featured verbal as well as situational comedy. His works are also noted for satirizing human idiocies.

== Death ==
"His short story book Abhisapta Gandharba is one of the finest works of Odia literature. He will always be remembered for his outstanding contribution to Odia literature. With his death, the state has lost an exceptional writer."
–Naveen Patnaik, Chief Minister of Odisha, eulogizing Sahoo.

Sahoo died on 25 June 2016 at the age of 89 in a private hospital at Bhubaneswar. He suffered from prostate cancer and was admitted to hospital on 24 June after falling critically ill. He died after multiple organ failures. He was survived by his wife, a son and a daughter.
