= Odisha Sahitya Akademi =

Odia-language literary institution

Odisha Sahitya Academy
- ଓଡ଼ିଶା ସାହିତ୍ୟ ଏକାଡେମୀ
- Formation: 1957
- Founded at: Bhubaneswar
- Headquarters: Bhubaneswar
- Location: Paradip
- President: Dilip Routrai
- Secretary: Chandrasekhar Hota
- Website: Odisha Sahitya Akademi

Odisha Sahitya Akademi (Odia: ଓଡ଼ିଶା ସାହିତ୍ୟ ଏକାଡେମୀ) is an institution established in 1957 in Odisha for the active promotion of Odia language and literature. It was created as an autonomous literary organisation. In 1970 it was converted into a society.

== Activities ==
The organisation carries out various activities for promotion of Odia language and literature. Chief among them are as below.

=== Publications ===
The organisation publishes Books in Odia, Translations of literature from Odia and vice versa, and periodicals for promotion of Odia language.

=== Prizes ===
The Akademi awards the following prizes in various categories of literature.

- Atibadi Jagannath Das Samman

Started in 1993, this prize is awarded for lifetime contribution to Odia literature.

- Odisha Sahitya Akademi Puraskar

This prize is awarded for outstanding contribution to Odia literature in various categories.

=== Promotion of literature ===
- Organisation Literary symposium
- It supplies books to school and college libraries.
- It organises literary workshops at various places both inside and outside Odisha.

== See also ==
- Sahitya Akademi
