= Jagadish Mohanty =

Indian writer (1951–2013)

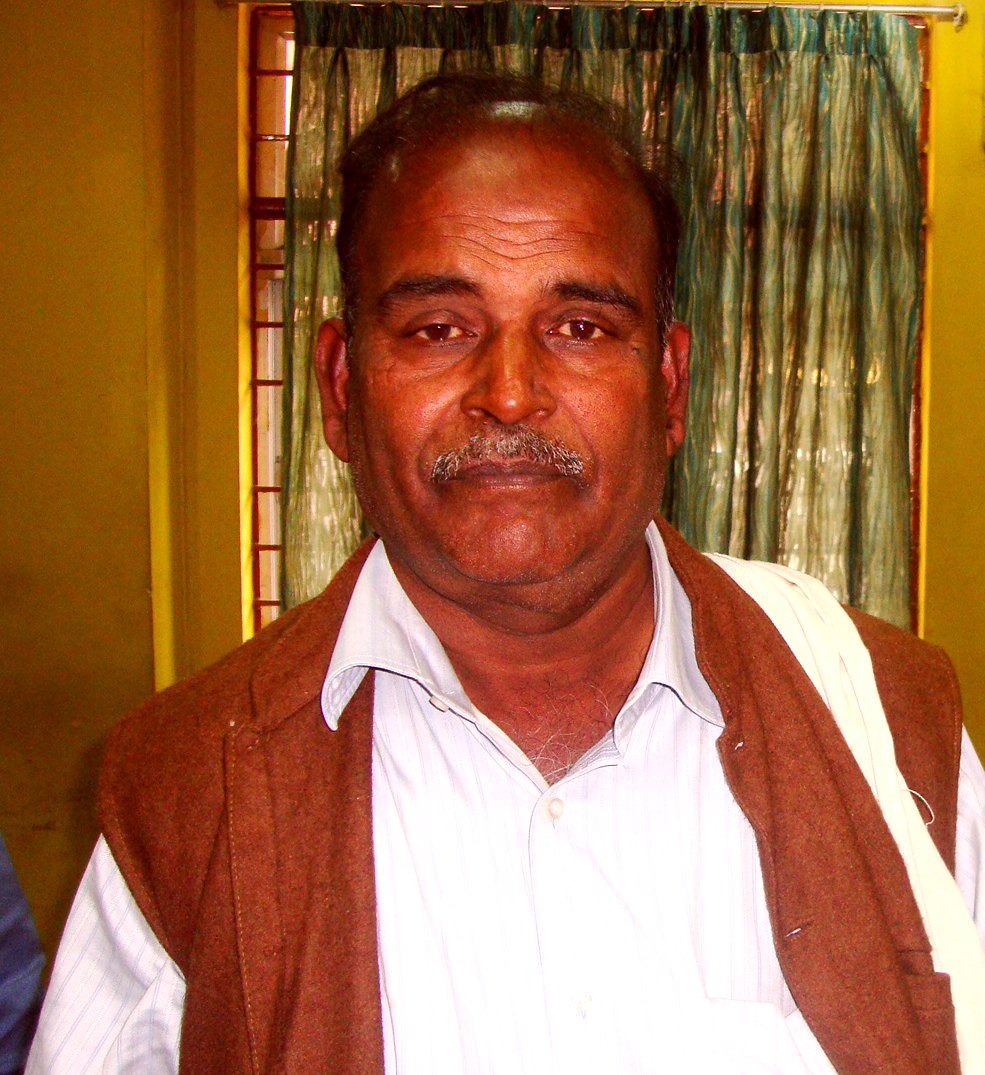
- Jagadish Mohanty
- Born: 17 February 1951; Gorumahisani, Mayurbhanj, Odisha
- Died: 29 December 2013 (aged 62); Belpahar, Jharsuguda, Odisha
- Occupation: Writer
- Spouse: Sarojini Sahoo
- Children: Anubhav and Sambedana
- Writing career
- Notable works: Suna Ilisi, Kaniska Kaniska
- Notable awards: Sarala Award, Odisha Sahitya Akademi Award

Jagadish Mohanty (17 February 1951 – 29 December 2013) was a renowned Odia writer, considered as a trendsetter in modern Odia fiction, has received the prestigious Sarala Award in 2003, Odisha Sahitya Akademi Award in 1990 for his novel Kanishka Kanishka, Dharitri Award in 1985, Jhankar Award, Prajatantra Award. Born in Gorumahisani, an iron-ore mines in northern periphery in Mayurbhanj district of Odisha, he spent more than 30 years of his life working in the Mahanadi Coalfields Limited(MCL) in western periphery of Odisha. Though he kept himself away from the cultural capital of Odisha, but still his writings highlighted him in the mainstream of Odia literature and culture.

Indian feminist writer Sarojini Sahoo is his wife and he has two children Anubhav and Sambedana. He died on 29 December 2013.

== Novels ==
- Kanishka Kanishka
- Nija Nija Panipatha
- Uttaradhikar
- Durdina
- Adrushya Sakala

== Short stories ==
- Ekaki Ashwarohi
- Dakshina Duari Ghara
- Irsha eka Rutu
- Album
- Dipahara Dekhinathiba Lokatie
- Juddhakshtre Eka
- Mephestophelese-ra Pruthibi
- Nian O Anyanya Galpa
- Suna Ilishi
- Sundartam Pap
- Saturir Jagadish
- Bija Bruxsha Chhaya

== Awards ==
He has been awarded with prestigious Sarala Award, sponsored by IMFA foundation in 2003 for his short story collection Suna Ilishi, Awarded with Odisha Sahitya Akademi Award in 1989 for his novel Kanishka Kanishka, Awarded with Jhankar Award, Utkal Sahitya Samaj Katha Samman and Bhubaneswar Book fair Award for his contribution to Odia fiction. Besides this he has been felicated and awarded by Mahanadi Coalfields Limited (a subsidiary of Coal India), M/S J.K.Paper Mills Ltd, Jay Kay Pur, the Daily news paper Dharirti and other various institutions of Odisha.

== Editing ==
He was the editor of a Literary journal "The Sambartaka" from 1980 –82 .the journal has a great significant value in the history of fiction writing in Odia literature. Documentary Delhi Doordarshan, a National Channel of India has telecast a documentary film on both Jagadish and Sarojini, the couple writer of India under the title of Literary post card. Dr. Satti Khanna, of Duke University, Durham directed the documentary.

== Translations ==
His stories have been translated in English, Hindi, Bengali, Malayalam and Telugu. His translated stories have been anthologized in different short story collections of HarperCollins, National Book Trust, Sahitya Academy, and Gyanapitha.

He himself also translated different Odia prose and poetry into Hindi and has been published in different Hindi literary magazines. He also occasionally writes in Hindi and his first Hindi story was published in Dharmayuga in 1979. Since then he occasionally writes in different Hindi magazines like Samakaleen Bharatiya Sahitya, Dharmayuga, Sarika, Sakshatkar.

== See also ==
- List of Indian writers
