= Gopal Rath =

Indian Odia poet

Gopal Krushna Rath
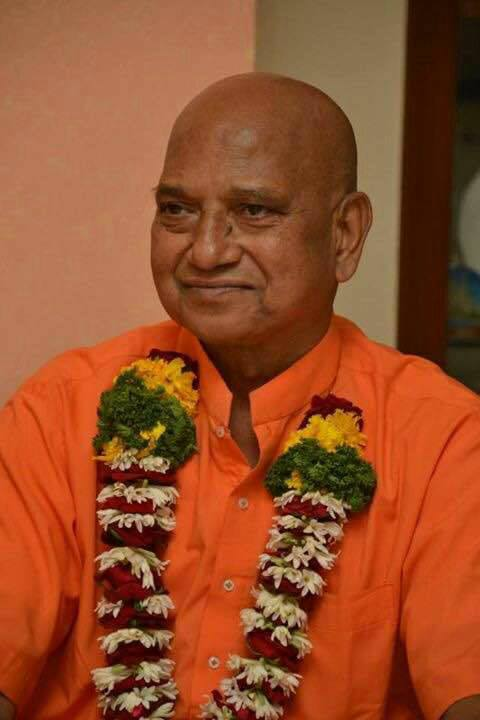
- Born: 3 August 1945; Sambalpur
- Died: 30 December 2016 (aged 71); Pune
- Education: LLM, Ph D.
- Occupation: Professor
- Spouse: Dr Kiranbala Rath
- Writing career
- Language: Odia
- Genre: Poetry
- Notable work: Bipula Diganta
- Notable awards: Sahitya Akademi

Gopal Krushna Rath (1945 – 2016) was an Indian Odia poet. He won Sahitya Akademi award for Odia literature in 2014 for his poetry collection Bipula Diganta.

== Life ==
Rath was born in Sambalpur, on 3 August 1945. He grew up in Sambalpur town and studied to become a law professional. He started his career as a judge; however he changed his career to academics. He retired as a Professor in Law from Sambalpur University. He was a former chairman of the PG Council of Sambalpur University. He was also member of Sahitya Akademi advisory board

He was married to Dr Kiranbala Rath, an academic, author and an orator. They had four children but lost three of them.

Rath renounced material world and became a sanyasi in 2014. He was also known as Srimat Swami Gururupananda Saraswati Maharaj. Along with Gopal Krushna, his wife also took to Sanyas and is known as Maa Kalyanmayee Saraswati.

Rath died in Pune on 30 December 2016.

== Works ==
Rath started writing poems when he was in high school. He published poems in most Odia magazines. Rath won Sahitya Akademi award for his poetry collection "Bipula Diganta". He authored six anthologies of poems:

- Ekla Manisha (Friends Publishers,1980)
- Kete dura (1990),
- Kuni Pua O Nishpaapa Sakaala (2000)
- Bipula Diganta (Lark Books, 2010),
- Bihwala Belabhoomi (Pakshighara Publications, 2013)
- Aruna Udbhaasa (Pakshighara Publications, 2016)

== Awards ==
- Sahitya Akademi 2014
- Odisha Sahitya Akademi 2003
- Jhankar Poetry Award 1984
- SAHITYA PRUTHVI SAMMAN 2012
- BALDEV SAHITYA SANSAD SAMMAN 2007
- Kendra Sahitya Akademi Award 2014
