= Ramesh Chandra Parida =

Odia chemist and author

Dr. Ramesh Chandra Parida
- Born: 4 January 1947; Jamapara, Kendrapara, Odisha
- Education: MSc(Chemistry), Phd
- Spouse: Dr. Kanakalata Parida
- Writing career
- Language: Odia
- Genre: Popular Science
- Notable awards: Sahitya Academy Award, Odisha Bigyan Academy Award and others

Ramesh Chandra Parida is an Indian chemist, academic and writer. He was a professor of chemistry at the College of Basic Science and Humanities. He has authored over 90 Popular science books in Odia and English.

== Early life and education ==
Ramesh Chandra Parida was born on 4 January 1947. in a rural village named Jamapara, in Patakura P.S of Kendrapara District (Odisha state). His father Bhramarbar Parida was a Basic School teacher and his mother Satyabhama Parida was a home-maker. As a school student, he wrote and published short stories and poems in various children's magazines and Children's page of newspapers. After completing his high school education at a neighbouring village, Karilopatana, in 1962, Parida obtained B.Sc. (Hons) degree (1966) and M.Sc. in Chemistry degree (1968) from the then Ravenshaw College, Cuttack (now a unitary University).

== Profession ==
Parida worked as a lecturer in Chemistry at Godavarish College, Banapur (1968–70), Govt. Arts and Science College, Daman Union Territory. (1970–1976) and College of Basic Science and Humanities, Odisha University of Agriculture and Technology Bhubaneswar (1976–1996), from which he retired as the Professor of Chemistry in 2007 (Associate Professor -1996-1999 and Professor and Head, 1999–2007). He also worked as a Scientist, Regional Research Laboratory Jorhat (1983-1983) and as the Principal of Aeronautics College, Sunabeda, Odisha (1988–1990).

== Research ==
Parida's main field of research was the study of Rice Protein, for which he was awarded a Ph. D. degree by the Utkal University in 1990. He has published about 20 research papers on the subject.

== Writing career ==
Parida is a prolific popular science writer in Odia as well as in English. He has written a large number of articles and books to popularize science in both the languages (in Odia about 3000 articles and 80 books in English about 300 articles 11 books).

=== Books ===
Parida has written over eighty numbers of popular science books in Odia literature and edited a number of science magazines and news bulletin. Some of Parida's books are

1. Bigyanika
2. Bigyan Re Nutan Diganta
3. Lipira Computer Sikshya,
4. Laser Super Conductivity
5. DNA and After
6. Cloning

He has edited a number of science magazines that include the Bigyan O’ Paribesh Barta, the Science & Environment bulletin, the Bigyan Prbha and the Bigyana Diganta. He has been writing regular Science articles for Children and general reader in a number of Odia and English magazines and newspapers. He was also a member of the Odisha Sahitya Academy.
