= Sunadhar =

Sunadhar Gandakula
- Village
- Location in Odisha, India
- Coordinates: 20°0′57.381″N 86°19′29.998″E
- Country: India
- State: Odisha
- District: Jagatsinghpur
- Block (district subdivision): Balikuda
- Named for: "The land stands on gold basis"

Area
  - Total: 122.33 ha (302.28 acres)

Population (2011 census)
  - Total: 614
  - Density: 502/km^{2} (1,300/sq mi)
- Demonym(s): Sunadharia, Gandakulia

Languages
  - Official: Odia
- Time zone: UTC+5:30 (IST)
- PIN: 754119
- Telephone Code: 0671
- Vehicle registration: OD-21
- Nearest City: Jagatsinghpur
- Literacy: 82.42%
- Lok Sabha constituency: Jagatsinghpur
- Website: http://www.gandakula.wordpress.com

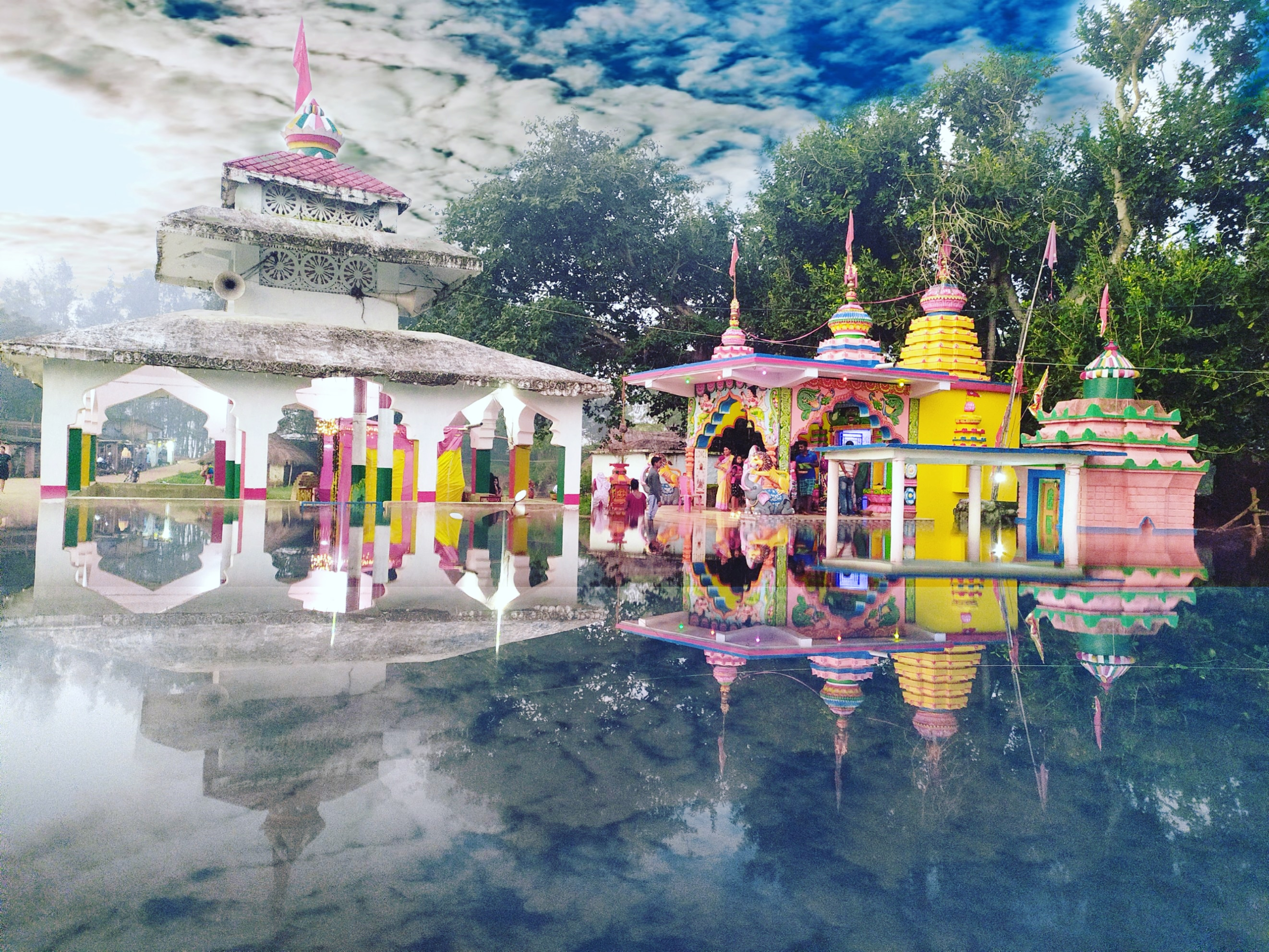
Gadibrahma Temple in Sunadhar

Sunadhar is a coastal village situated near the bank of the Devi River in the Jagatsinghpur district of Odisha, India. It is a part of the Gandakula region, which is divided into two villages, Bairakha and Sunadhar.

== Geography ==
Sunadhar is about 36 kilometres from the district town Jagatsinghpur on the Cuttack-Naharana road, about five kilometres from the Bay of Bengal.

Sunadhar is part of the Naharana Panchayat, which falls under the Balikuda-Erasama (Odisha Vidhan Sabha constituency) of Jagatsinghpur district. According to the 2011 census, there are 139 families in the village.

== Education ==
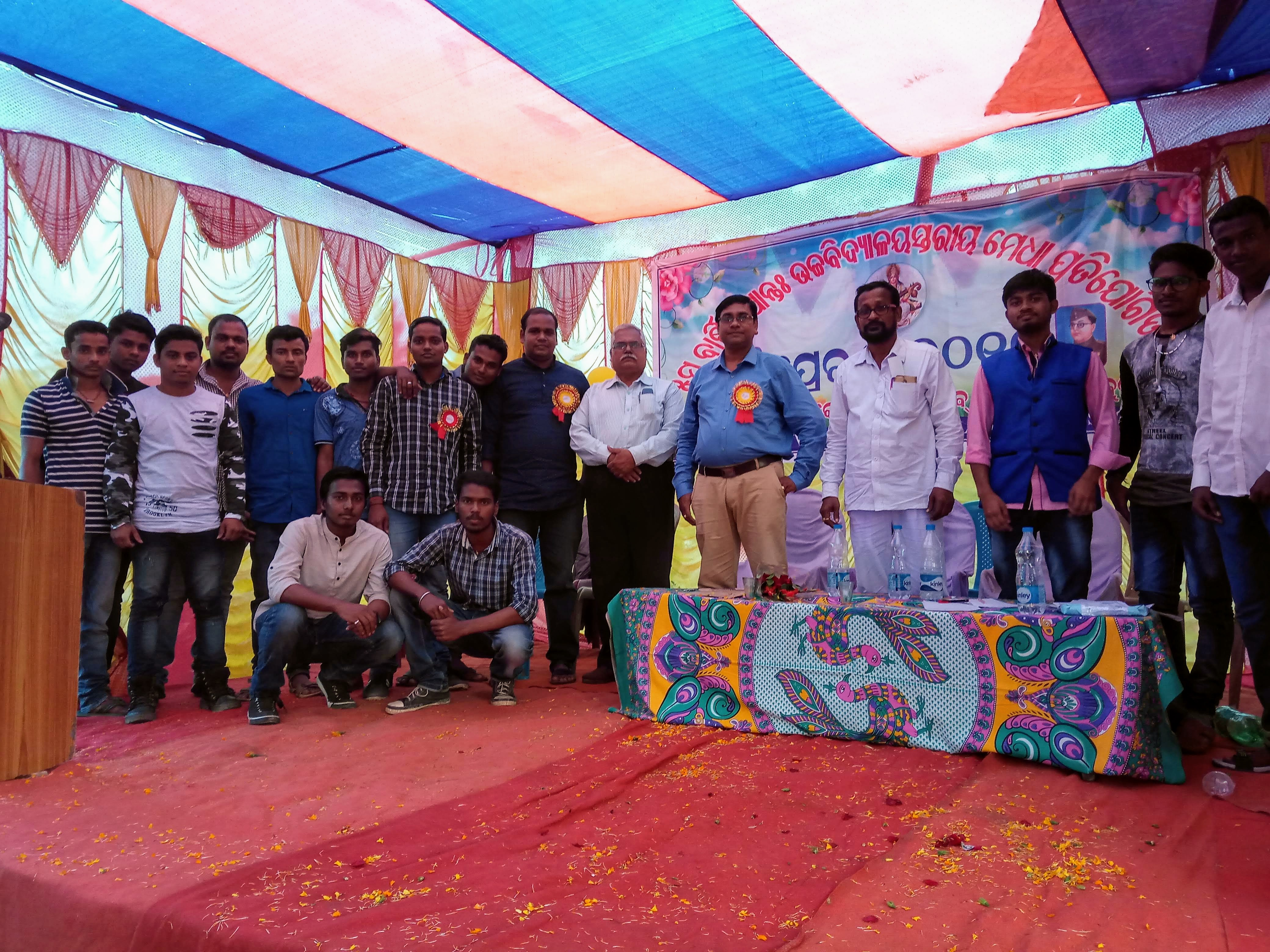
Prerana Event (MKYC)

Most of villagers are literate. In 2011, literacy rate of Sunadhar was 82.42% compared to 72.87% of Odisha. In Sunadhar Male literacy stands at 87.88% while Female literacy was at 76.32%.
