= Jagatsinghpur =

𝐉𝐚𝐠𝐚𝐭𝐬𝐢𝐧𝐠𝐡𝐩𝐮𝐫 Jagatsinghapur
- City
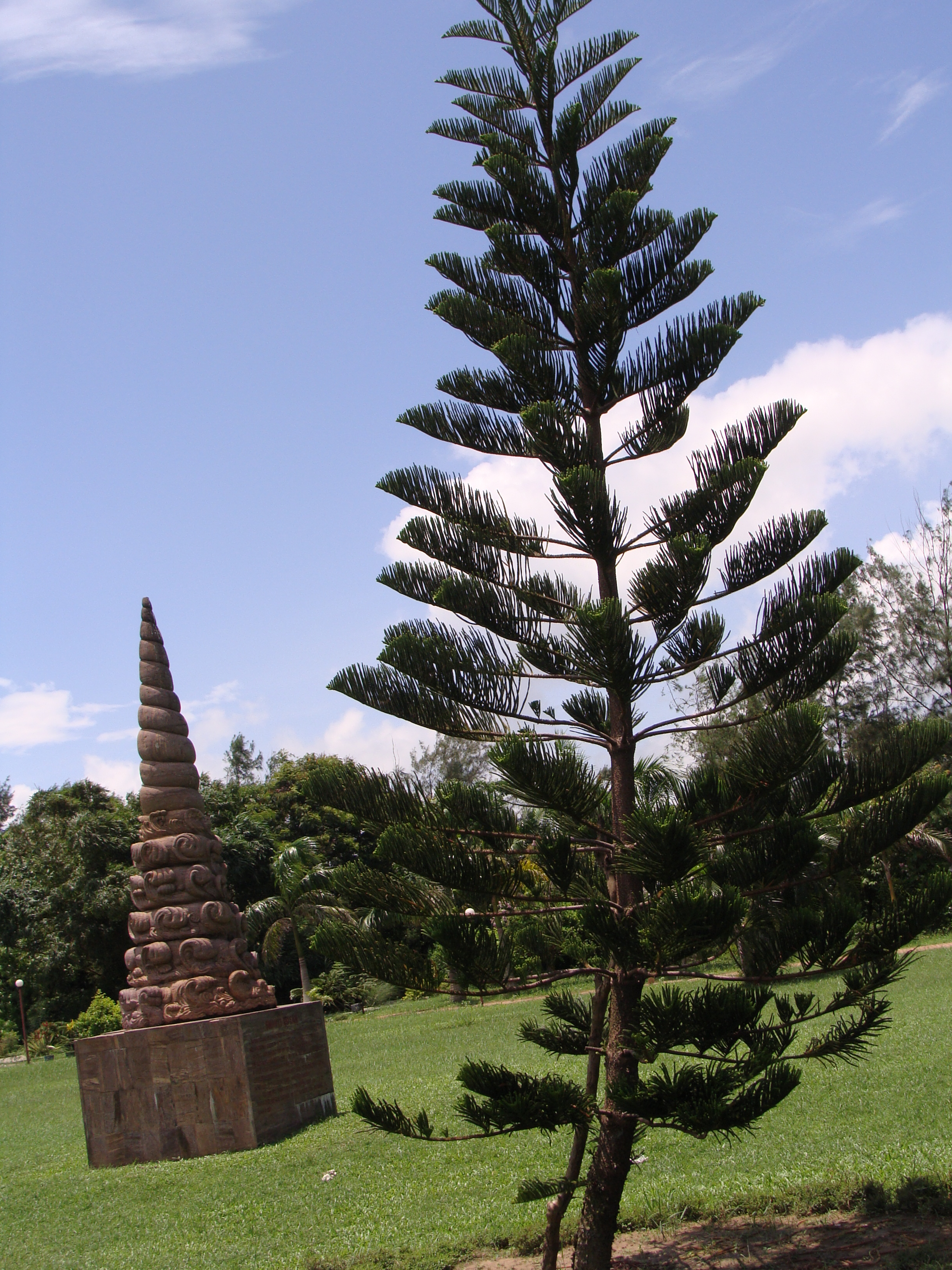
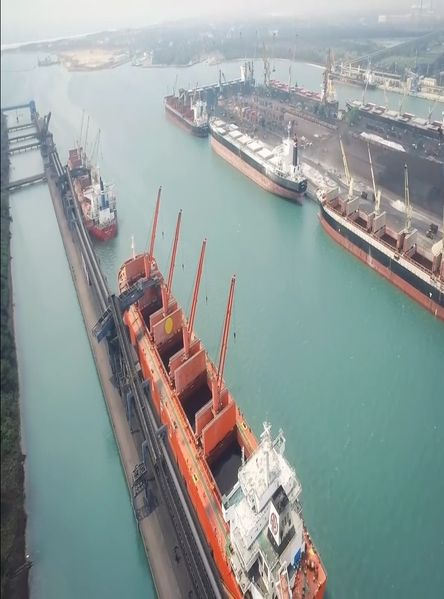
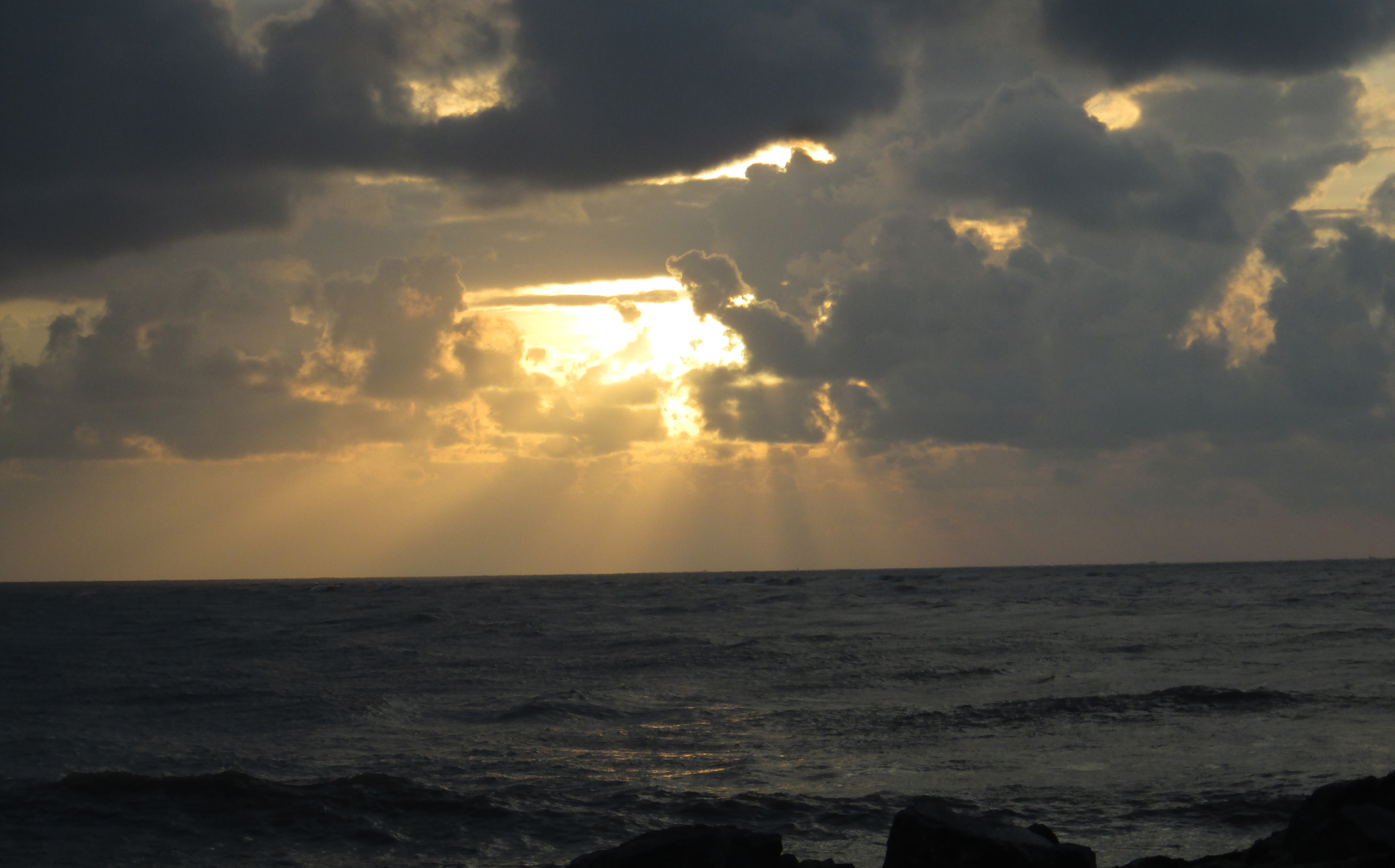
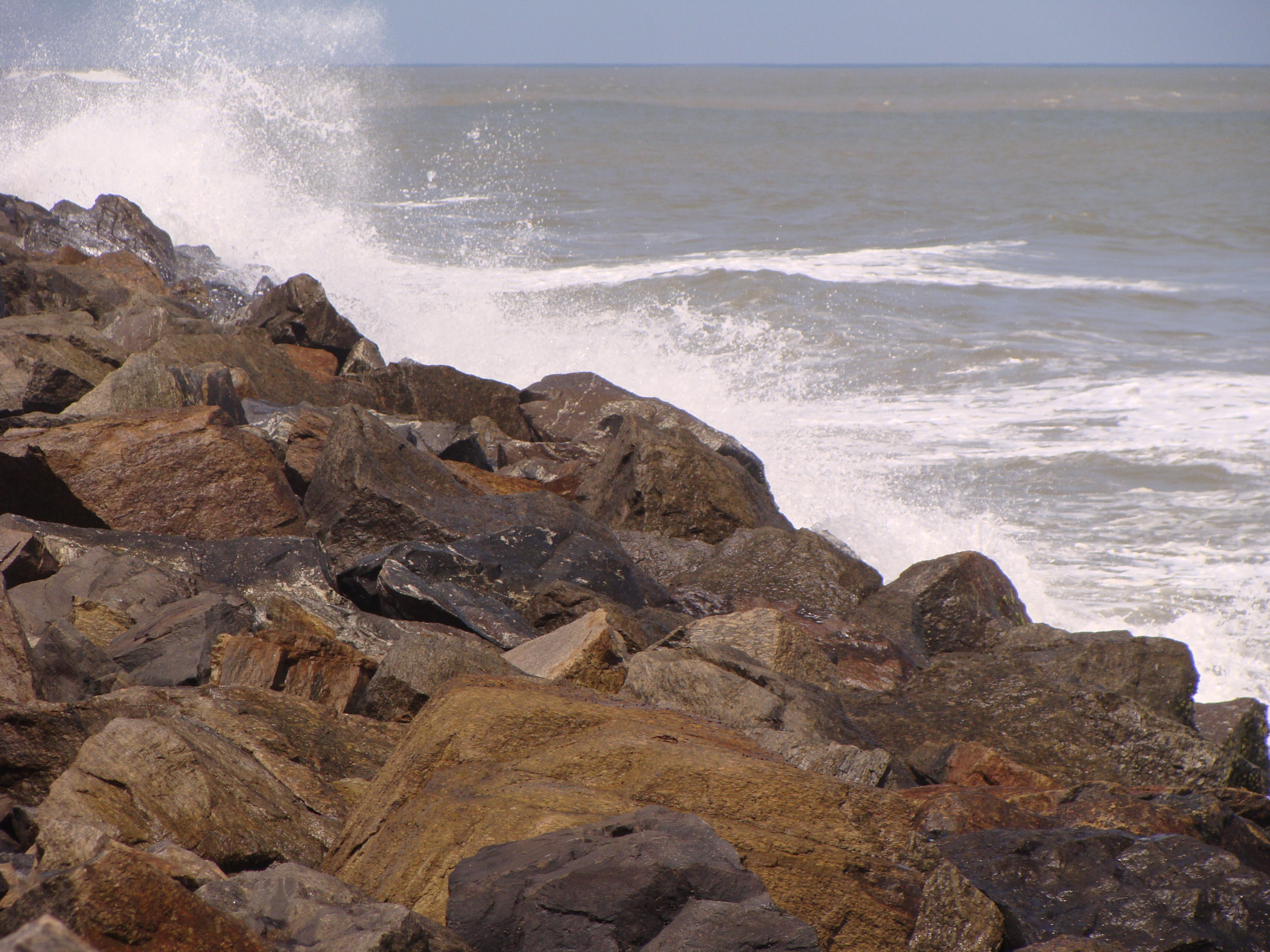
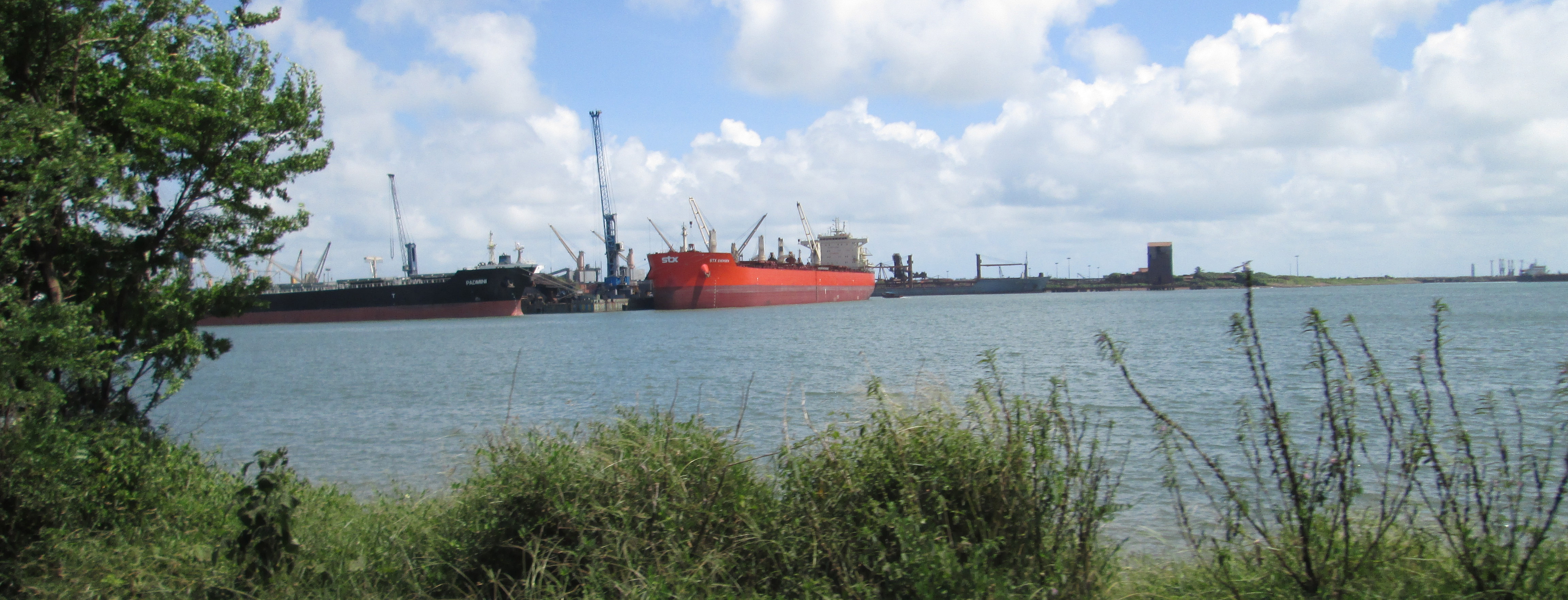
- From Top-Left: Statue of cyclone at Paradeep Beach, Aerial View of Paradeep Port, Sunset at Paradeep Beach, Paradeep Beach, Ship at Paradeep Port, Maa Sarala Temple
- Nickname: Bani Kshetra
- Location in Odisha, India 𝐉𝐚𝐠𝐚𝐭𝐬𝐢𝐧𝐠𝐡𝐩𝐮𝐫 (India)
- Coordinates: 20.27°N 86.17°E
- Country: India
- State: Odisha
- District: Jagatsinghpur
- Established: 1 April 1993; 33 years ago
- Founded by: Government of Odisha
- Named after: Jagat Singh

Government
  - Collector & District Magistrate: Shri J. Sonal, IAS
  - Superintendent of Police: Rahul P R, I.P.S.
  - MP (Jagatsinghpur): Bibhu Prasad Tarai BJP
  - Members of Legislative Assembly: Amarendra Das BJP

Area
  - Total: 1,759 km^{2} (679 sq mi)
- Elevation: 559.31 m (1,835.0 ft)

Population (2011)
  - Total: 1,136,971
  - Density: 646.4/km^{2} (1,674/sq mi)

Languages
  - Official: Odia, English
- Time zone: UTC+5:30 (IST)
- Postal code: 754103
- Vehicle registration: OD-21 (JAGATSINGHPUR)
- Sex ratio: 1.038 ♂/♀
- Literacy: 87.1%
- Vidhan Sabha constituency: 4: 101-Paradeep 102-Tirtol 103-Balikuda-Erasama 104-Jagatsinghpur
- Precipitation: 1,501.3 millimetres (59.11 in)
- Website: jagatsinghpur.nic.in

Jagatsinghpur is a vibrant coastal city and a municipality in Jagatsinghpur district in the Indian state of Odisha. It is also the headquarters of Jagatsinghpur district. It got the recognition as a new district on 1 April 1993 formerly it was a sub-division of Cuttack district. Paradip Port, Oil refinery and fertiliser factory are located in Jagatsinghpur district. Devi, Alaka, Biluakhai, Kusumi, Hansua, Kuanria and Lunijhara rivers belong to this district.

== Geography ==
Jagatsinghapur is at 20.27°N 86.17°E. It has an average elevation of 15 metres (49 feet).

== History ==
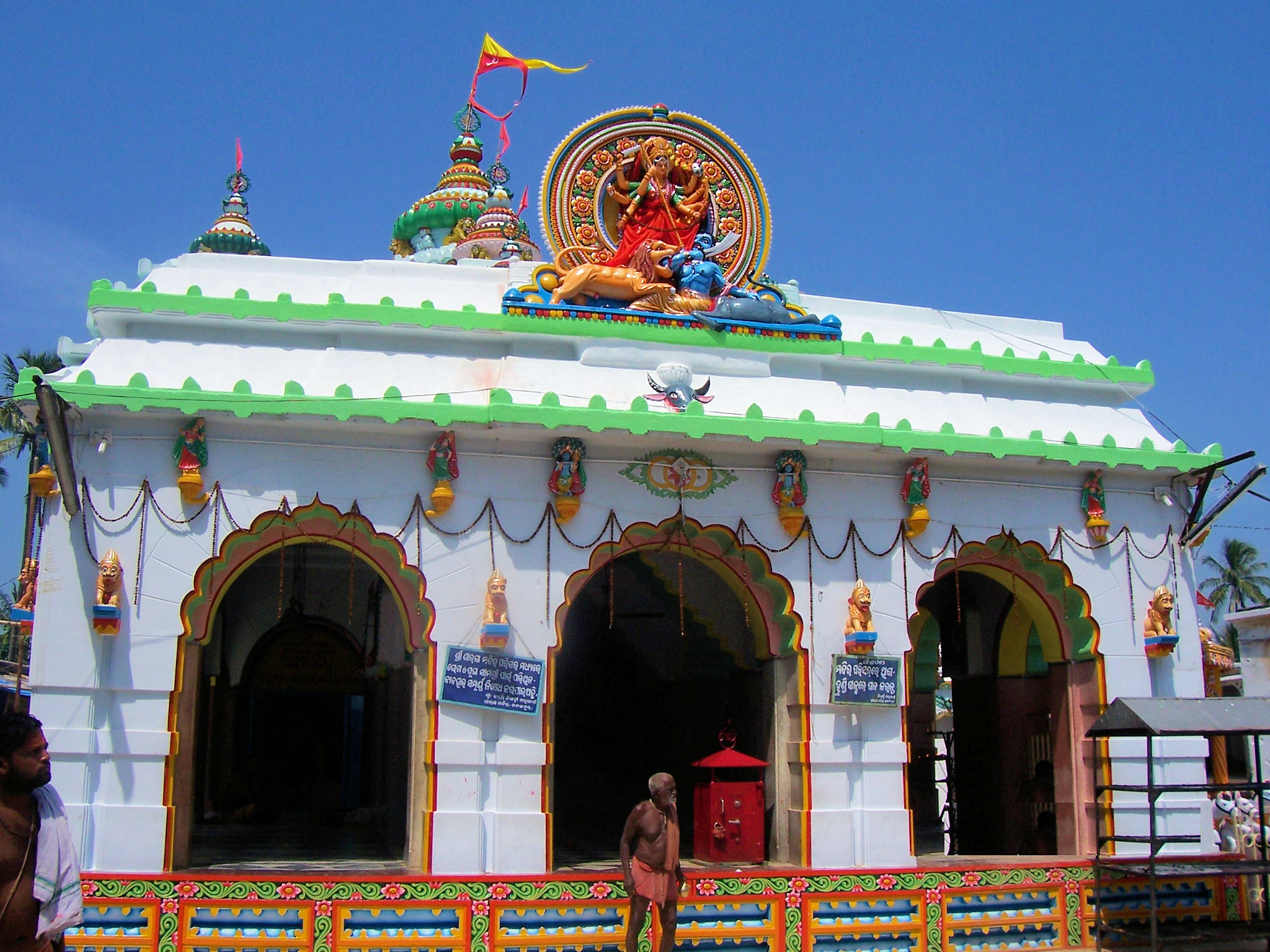
Sarala temple, Jagatsinghpur

Jagatsinghpur District came into existence on 1 April 1993. Before that, it was a part of the old Cuttack District which was divided into four new districts. It is surrounded by the districts of Kendrapara, Cuttack, Puri and Bay of Bengal. This district was also the worst hit by the 1999 Odisha Cyclone and had the highest death toll.

== Transportation ==
The nearest railway station from Jagatsinghpur town is Gorakhnath Station which is about 10 km from Jagatsinghpur. The nearest city is Cuttack, 40 km away. Train service is not frequent; it is better to go by road. Nearest airport is Biju Patnaik International Airport at Bhubaneswar. Charter air service from Biju Patnaik International Airport to Paradip is provided by Pawan Hans. Jagatsinghpur is well connected with other cities via road. OSRTC and Private operated bus services to all the major Cities and Towns in Odisha.

== Notable people born in Jagatsinghpur ==
The district, smallest in size among the 30 districts in Odisha, has produced some of the most famous names in Oriya. Notable among them are listed below.

=== Academics and scientists ===
- Jyotirmayee Dash
- Prana Krushna Parija,

=== Writers and poets ===
- Adikabi Sarala Das
- Gopal Chhotray
- Pratibha Ray
- Bibhuti Patnaik
- Devdas Chhotray
- Mamata Dash

=== Freedom fighters, politicians and leaders ===
- Nabakrushna Choudhury
- Malati Choudhury
- Nityanand Kanungo
- Nimain Charan Pattnaik
- Sarala Devi
- Basanta Biswal
- Gopabandhu Choudhury

== Theatre groups ==
The districts is also famous for having theatre groups which keep the old tradition of live acting before a crowd. The groups have become the part of the mainstream entertainment for people all over Odisha. Parbati Gannatya, Benirampur opera, Gouri Gananatya, Tulasi Gananatya, Durgashree Gananatya, Tarapur Opera and Trinath Gananatya are some of the famous theatre groups of Jagatsinghpur district.

== Politics ==
Current chairperson of Jagatsinghpur municipality is Archana Singh (Indian National Congress), successor of Biplab Choudhury in 2022 (Indian National Congress) and MLA from Jagatsinghpur Assembly Constituency is Sri Amarendra Das of Bharatiya Janata Party in 2024. Previous MLAs from this Constituency were Chiranjib Biswal (Congress) between 2014 and 2019 Bishnu Das (BJD) between 2004 and 2013, Kailash Chandra Mallik of (Indian National Congress) in 1985, Krushna Chandra Mallik of (Indian National Congress) in 1980, and Kanduri Charan Mallik of JNP in 1977.

Jagatsinghpur is a part of the Jagatsinghpur (Lok Sabha constituency).

== Villages ==
- Kamashasan
