= Biswal =

Biswal (Odia: ବିଶ୍ୱାଳ) is an Odia surname. People of various castes like Khandayats, Gopals, Chasas use this surname. Notable people with the surname include:

- Nisha Desai Biswal (born 1968), American diplomat
- Anuradha Biswal (born 1975), Indian athlete
- Chiranjib Biswal, Indian politician
- Ranjib Biswal (born 1970), Indian cricketer
- Chittaranjan Biswal ( born 1983 ), Corporate leader (worked for L&T , Punj Lloyd,Vedanta,NTPC,IOCL,JIO, Dalmia Cement,Aditya Birla,Tata steel)
