= Kamashasan =

Coordinates: 20.355601°N 86.033721°E

Kamashasan କାମଶାସଂ
- Village
- Nickname: Bagula
- Interactive map of Kamashasan
- Country: India
- State: Odisha
- District: Jagatsinghpur
- Tehsil: Jagatsinghpur
- Elevation: 14 m (46 ft)

Languages
  - Official: Odia, English
- Time zone: UTC+5:30 (IST)
- Area code: 06724

Kamashasan, locally known as Bagula, is a village in the district of Jagatsinghpur, Odisha, India. Bagula is famous for the vegetable cultivation and its quality and varieties of vegetables in major cities of Odisha.

== Geographical location ==
Bagula is in the District of Jagatsinghpur, Odisha, India. It falls under Hajipur Gram Panchyat and Biridi Block. It is situated in the river bank of Devi and Biluakhai River Bifurcation point. The south western part is surrounded by the Machagaon Canal.

== Transport ==
Kamashasan is located 20 km from Cuttack and Jagatsinghpur City Center on SH-43. The village is well connected to the neighborhood via road, ferry and railways. The nearest railway station is Kandarpur, which is 7 km towards Cuttack on SH-43. The nearest airport (Biju Patnaik Airport) is at Bhubaneswar nearly 60 km via Cuttack. The public transport frequency is 15-20 min for roadways (6:00 AM – 9:00 PM) and for railways every 3 to 4 Hrs.

== Education ==
Kamashasan has an Upper Primary School, Anganwadi Kendra. A High School, M.E Schools, Girls High Schools, and Colleges are nearby. Most of the villagers are literate. Agriculture is the primary business, few are employed in the government and private sectors. People in Kamashasan are well educated and well established in different parts of the world.

== Language ==
The major spoken language is Oriya (Oriya); Hindi and English are the secondary.

== Tourist places ==
Dhyanakuda Pitha is famous for Pancha Sakha Matha and Jagannatha Temple in the vicinity. Astasambhu Temple for Lord Shiva is nearby.

== Disasters ==
Floods are the major disaster for the village and Jagatsinghpur District. Daleighai embankment of Devi river flows above the danger mark every year in the months of July to September. Village comes under high alert for flood with heavy loss of crops and vegetable cultivated in the river valley. The State Government takes all major to prevent and protect the river with 24×7 patrolling. It was worst affected in the 1982 flood.
