= Sarada Prasanna Jena =

Indian politician

Sarada Prasanna Jena (born 1971) is an Indian politician from the state of Odisha. He is a Member of the Legislative Assembly (MLA) from Balikuda-Erasama Assembly constituency in Jagatsinghpur district. He won the 2024 Odisha Legislative Assembly election representing the Biju Janata Dal party.

== Early life and education ==
Jena is from Balikuda Erasama, Jagatsinghpur district, Odisha. He is the son of Shankar Jena. He completed his Bachelor of Commerce degree in 1994 at Banki College, Banki, which is affiliated with Utkal University.

== Career ==
Jena won from Balikuda-Erasama Assembly constituency representing Biju Janata Dal in the 2024 Odisha Legislative Assembly election. He polled 93,517 votes and defeated his nearest rival, Satya Sarathi Mohanty of the Bharatiya Janata Party (BJP), by a margin of 25,959 votes.
