= Hasim nagar =

Coordinates: 20°15′13.47″N 86°21′28.3″E

Hasim Nagar is a small village in Odisha, India. It belongs to the Jagatsinghpur district. The 2011 Census of India states that there are one hundred eighty four people live in the village, with a literacy rate of 90.64%, which is well above the Odisha state average of 72.87%.

It is constitute of two parts and in every part Maa Budhi Jagalai temple is situated. There is also present Ananta Gopal Asram at the starting position of the village.
