= Bilanka Ramayana =

Retelling of the epic Ramayana

Information
- Religion: Hinduism
- Author: Sarala Dasa
- Language: Odia language
- Period: 15th century

Bilanka Ramayana (Odia: ବିଲଙ୍କା ରାମାୟଣ, romanized: Bilaṅkā Rāmāyaṇa, pronounced Bilånkā Rāmāyåṇå), also known as Vilanka Ramayana (Sanskrit: विलङ्का रामायण, romanized: Vilaṅkā Rāmāyaṇa) is a 15th-century retelling of the Indian epic poem, the Ramayana, written by Sarala Dasa in Odia, who dedicates the work to Sāraḷā Chaṇḍī, the tutelary goddess of Jagatsinghpur in Odisha. The work is generally regarded as forming a supplementary kanda to the Odia Ramayana and is loosely based on the Adbhuta Ramayana, a Shakta version of the Ramayana in Sanskrit.

== Summary ==
This work is written in Dandi metre (Odia - ଦାଣ୍ଡି ବୃତ୍ତି) commonly used in Odia literature, which renders it suitable for both singing and better understanding among the Odia folk. The events unfold after the death of Ravana in Lanka.

Written in the form of a divine narration of the tale by the God Shiva to his wife Parvati, it begins with the meeting of the gods in Indra's court, where Yama laments at his unending duty to lead souls and the gods discuss their own, aware of the eminent danger posed by Sahasrasira Ravana (Odia - ସହସ୍ରଶିରା ରାବଣ, Såhåsråsirā Rābåṇå), who has already imprisoned many of them in his city of Bilanka/Vilanka (Odia - ବିଲଙ୍କା) in Patala. Thereby, the gods plan to stop the upcoming coronation of Rama in Ayodhya, as he would then become too busy with his kingly duties and the welfare of his kingdom, ignoring their call for him to slay the demon.

Heeding to their pleas, Brahma sends Khåḷā (ଖଳା) and Durbåḷā (ଦୁୁର୍ବଳା), who sit on Sita's and Rama's tongues, manipulating their talk. As expected, the humble Rama prides himself on having killed Ravana by himself, while the dutiful Sita chides him, mentioning herself as the true reason for his death. Further, she challenges him to kill Sahasrasira Ravana to prove his might.

Rama departs to Patala with his army, which is completely destroyed, and he falls unconscious over 70 yojanas away, with a single clap of the extremely powerful Sahasrasira Rabana. Hanuman returns to Ayodhya with Sandalwood for Rama's coronation and leaves for his aide, facing many hurdles on his way to Bilanka. He is also gobbled up by Sahasrasira, but is released upon hearing the continuous chanting of Rama's name. On learning about his enemy approaching, Sahasrasira leads his demon army to the battlefield, along with his sons Saptasira, Tinisira and his grandsons Nabhidatya, Sumbha, Nisumbha and so on.

The epic thereafter essentially contains a brief account of the fierce battle between Rama and Sahasrasira Ravana of Vilanka in Patala. At the end, Rama, who had become famished after killing all other asuras but still not having defeated Sahasrasira, sent Hanuman to bring Sita, and she comes equipped with the blessed Panchasara weapon from goddess Katyayini. She transforms into her huge Trailokya Mohini form (Odia - ତ୍ରୈଲୋକ୍ୟ ମୋହିନି) momentarily blinding the demon, allowing Rama to kill him.

== Theme ==
This magnum opus was written in special glorification of Sita, who, as an apotheosis of the goddess Kali, is represented to have helped Rama to slay the demon Ravana of Patala with 1,000 heads. The story is written as a poem, in a very lucid and simple chaste Odia. It vividly describes the scenes of war and the beauty of Bilanka, along with special mentions to the accessories of the characters and Odia culture.

== See also ==
• Odia literature • Jagamohana Ramayana • Sarala Mahabharata • Sri Rodha
