= Machhagaon =

Coordinates: 20.072465°N 86.274692°E

Machhagaon is a village in Jagatsinghpur district, Odisha, India. It is connected by state high-way from Cuttack. The village is about 26 km from district headquarters of Jagatsinghpur and is well connected by State highway. Machhagaon (meaning village of fish) is situated on the bank of the Devi River and has traditionally been a business and fish centre.
