= Prana Krushna Parija =

Indian scientist (1891–1978)

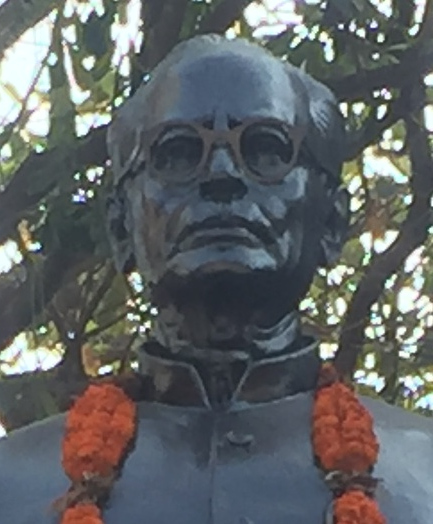
- Born: 1 April 1891; Jagatsinghpur, Balikuda, Bengal Presidency, British India (now Ichhapur, Balikuda, Jagatsinghpur, Odisha, India)
- Died: 2 June 1978 (aged 87)
- Education: Ravenshaw University; Presidency University, Kolkata; University of Cambridge
- Awards: Padma Bhushan (1955); Officer of the Order of the British Empire (OBE; 1944)
- Scientific career
- Fields: Botany
- Workplaces: Ravenshaw University; Banaras Hindu University; Utkal University

Member: 1st Odisha Legislative Assembly
- In office 1952–1957
- Constituency: Balikuda

Prana Krushna Parija OBE (1 April 1891 – 2 June 1978) was an Indian botanist. His research work comprised mainly fundamental and applied aspects of plant physiology, experimental plant morphology, and ecological studies of plant environment. He studied water hyacinth and other aquatic weeds, respiration in leaves and apples, transpiration and heat resistance in plants, rice and algae and storage of apples. He was born in icchapur village Jagatsinghpur in a well known Karana family.

He served as a vice chancellor of Utkal University. He worked as a principal in Ravenshaw University (formerly Ravenshaw College), CuttackPro Vice-Chancellor of Banaras Hindu University, Varanasi and Vice-Chancellor of Utkal University, Bhubaneswar. The "Parija Library" of the university is named after him. He was President of the Indian Science Congress Association in 1960. He was an elected member of the first Odisha Legislative Assembly.

His daughter Saudamini Parija was married to the well-known Mathematician Ram Prakash Bambah. Their daughter Bindu Bambah is a well-known Theoretical Physicist.

== Awards and recognitions ==
- Fearnsides Scholarship (1918), Christ's College, Cambridge, a scholarship to encourage clinical research in the field of organic diseases of the nervous system.
- Officer of the Order of the British Empire (OBE), 1944 New Year Honours
- Padma Bhushan, 1955
