= Boura Hatabaksa =

- Promotional poster
- Directed by: Narayan Pati
- Screenplay by: Narayan Pati
- Story by: Arati Pattajoshi
- Produced by: Sanjay Das, Rosalin Das
- Starring: Narayan Pati; Lopamudra Mishra; Sabita Palei; Rajesh Panda
- Cinematography: Biraja Prasanna Kar
- Edited by: Chandrasekhar Mishra
- Music by: Khiti Prakash Mahapatra
- Production company: Chairosana Film Productions Pvt. Ltd
- Release date: 30 December 2022
- Running time: 128 minutes
- Country: India
- Language: Odia

Boura Hatabaksa: The Eternal Bond is an Indian Odia-language family drama film directed by Narayan Pati and written by Arati Pattajoshi released in 2022. It was produced by Sanjay Das and Rosalin Das under the Chairosana Film Productions Pvt. Ltd banner. It is a family drama. Mother's unconditional love for her son, depth of husband and wife's relationship and emotional bond between two generations.

== Cast ==
- Narayan Pati as Raghunath
- Lopamudra mishra
- Sabita palei
- Rajesh Panda
- Abhisekh Sahoo
- Gourav

== Soundtrack ==
The music of the film was composed by Khiti Prakash Mahapatra. The lyrics were written by Devdas Chhotray and Managobinda Barik. The soundtracks are released on 20 July 2022.

== Release ==
This movie released on 30 December 2022 on theaters. Before that, the release dates extended a few times.
