= Astaranga =

Village in Odisha, India

- Village
- Location in Odisha, India Astaranga (India)
- Coordinates: 19.9794794°N 86.2693691°E
- Country: India
- State: Odisha
- District: Puri

Government
  - Type: Odisha government
- Elevation: 8 m (26 ft)

Languages
  - Official: Odia
- Time zone: UTC+5:30 (IST)
- Postal code: 752109
- Vehicle registration: OD
- Website: odisha.gov.in

Astaranga is a fishing and agricultural village and a community development block in Puri district in the Indian state of Odisha. It was a part of 'Lavana Satyagraha' (Salt March), a nonviolent civil disobedience movement in colonial India led by Mahatma Gandhi. It is a major exporter of betel leaves, mainly to North India and other countries. The most visited tourist place, known as Pir Jahania, is situated at the shore of Bay of Bengal. Casuarina trees are planted in a vast area to give shades to the tourists. Astaranga also has two other picnic spots like Ganga Devi muhana & Nuagarh jethi. The government has planned for a marine drive road along the seashore. In Astaranga, there is a nodal primary school above a century old, a high school above 50 years old whose first headmaster was 'Sarala puraskar' winner for his poetry Kulamani Swain, a Saraswati Sishu Vidya Mandir, Anganbadi for small children and three CBSE schools.

== Etymology ==
Astranga means 'colors of setting Sun'.

== Geography ==
Astaranga is located at 19°58′46″N 86°16′10″E. It is near the mouth of the Devi River. It is about 60 kilometres (37 mi) east of Puri and lies on the Bay of Bengal coast. It is about 19 kilometres (12 mi) from Konark.

== Economy ==
=== Port ===
Hyderabad-based Navayuga Engineering Co. is planning to construct a Rs. 6 billion port at Astaranga. The company will implement the port project near the Devi River in three phases on a build- own-operate-share-transfer basis, with an investment of Rs. 1.50 billion in the first phase. The second and third phase of the project will comprise Rs. 2 billion and Rs. 2.50 billion, respectively. Astaranga is one of the four new ports being set up on the Odisha coast. Nineteen sites for ports have been identified on the Odisha coast. Navayug Engineering Company Limited submitted techno-feasibility report with the State government for setting up port at Astaranga in Puri district. It approached East Coast Railway to extend the project, a rail link.

The Odisha government has relaxed a vital clause in its MoU with the Navayuga Engineering Company Limited (NECL) enabling the latter to sign a concession agreement with it for developing an all weather port at Astaranga.

=== Power plant ===
Astaranga Power Company Ltd signed a MoU with Government of Odisha in 2009 for setting up a power plant at Astaranga. It intends to establish a 2,640MW thermal power plant in two phases.

=== Steel plant ===
Navayuga Engineering Company Limited is interested in setting up a port-based steel facility, preferably at Astaranga.
