= Jagatsinghpur district =

- District of Odisha
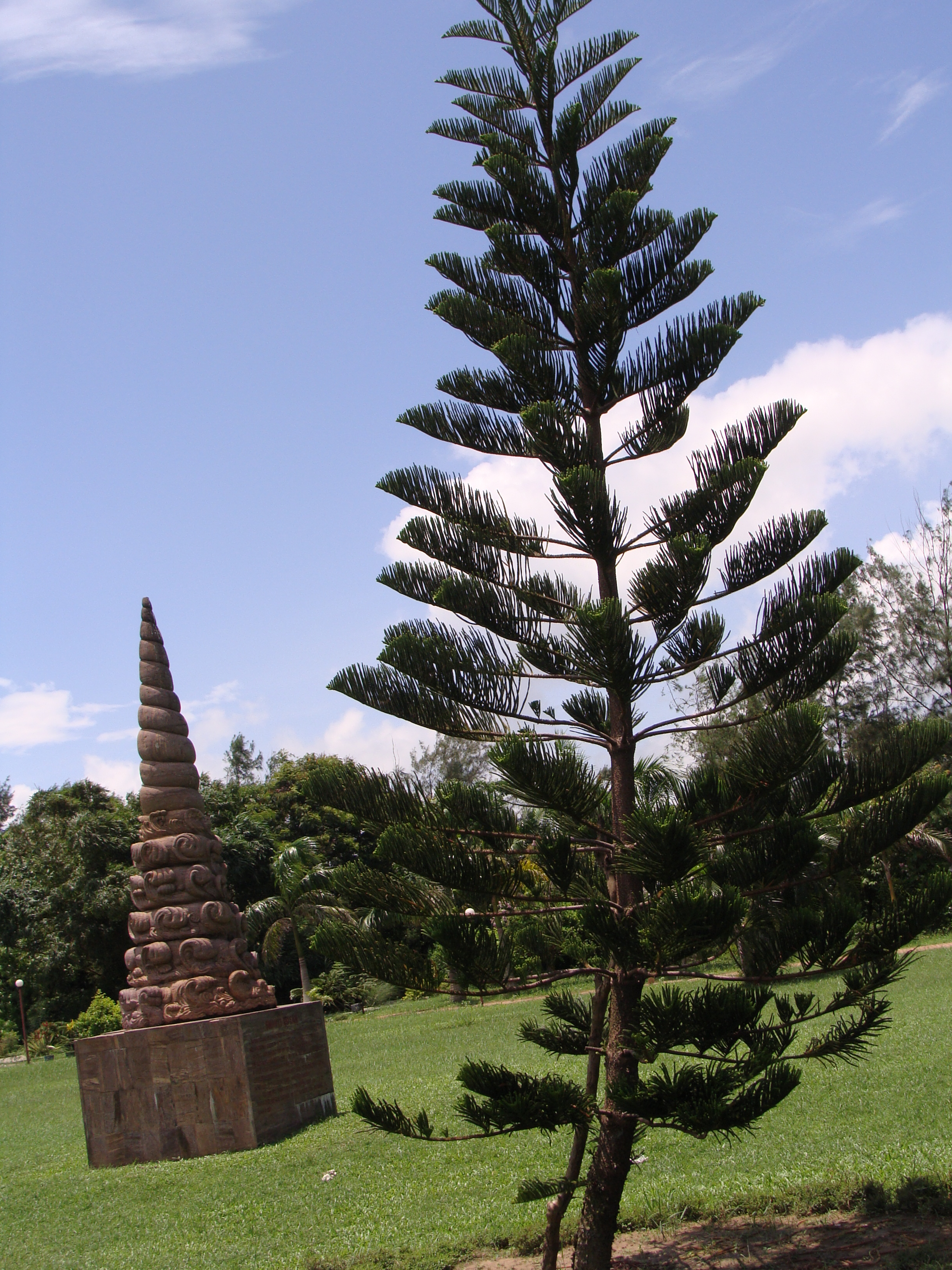
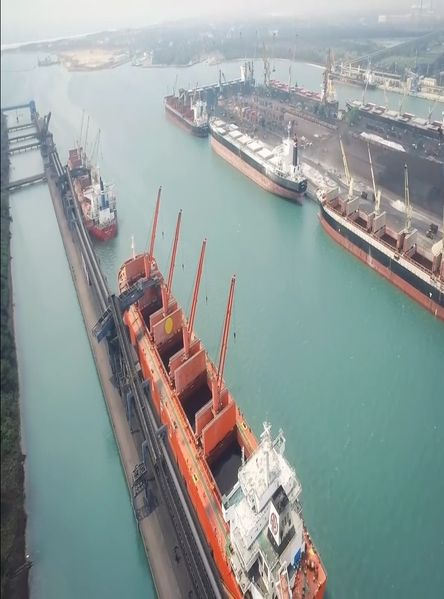
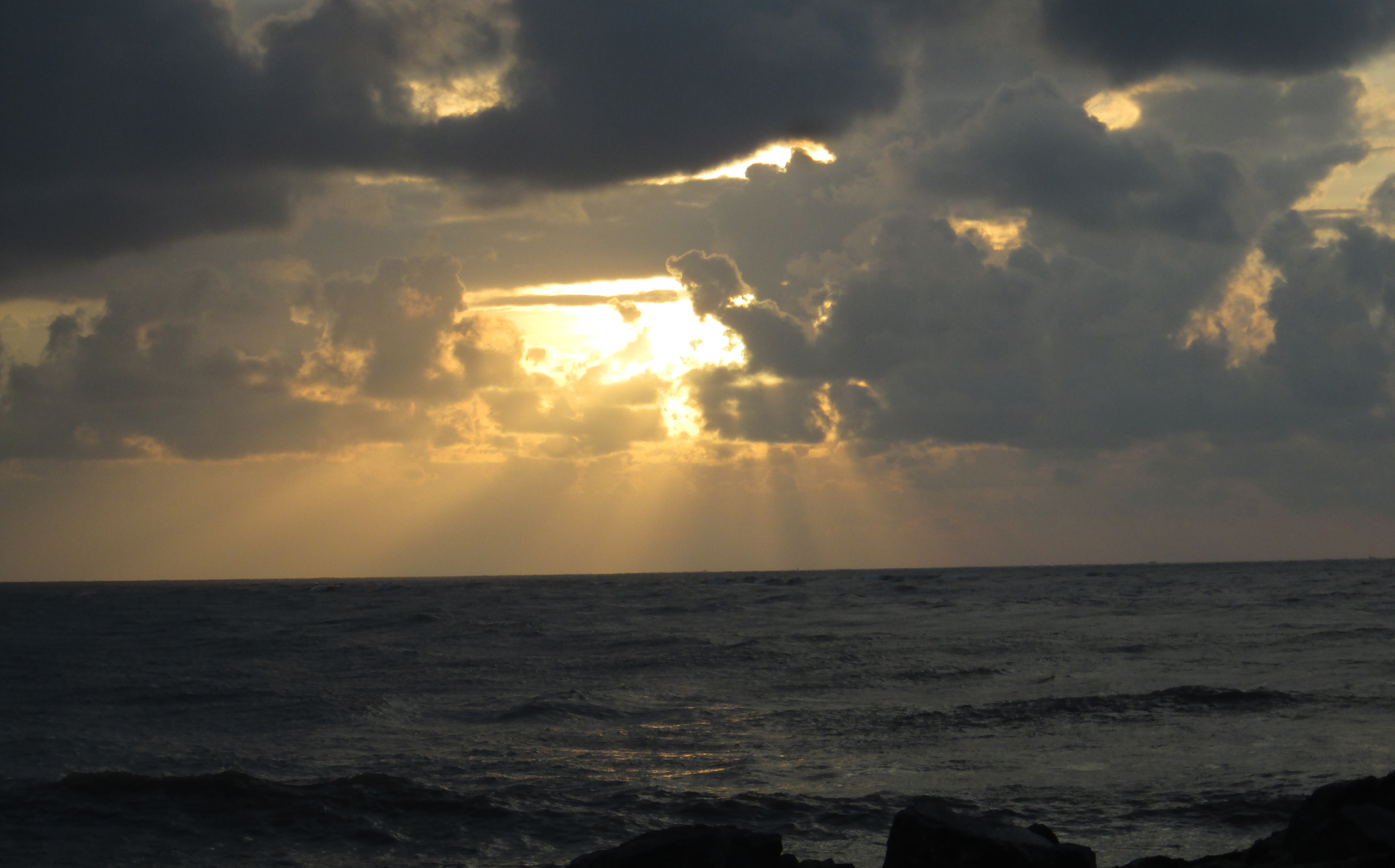
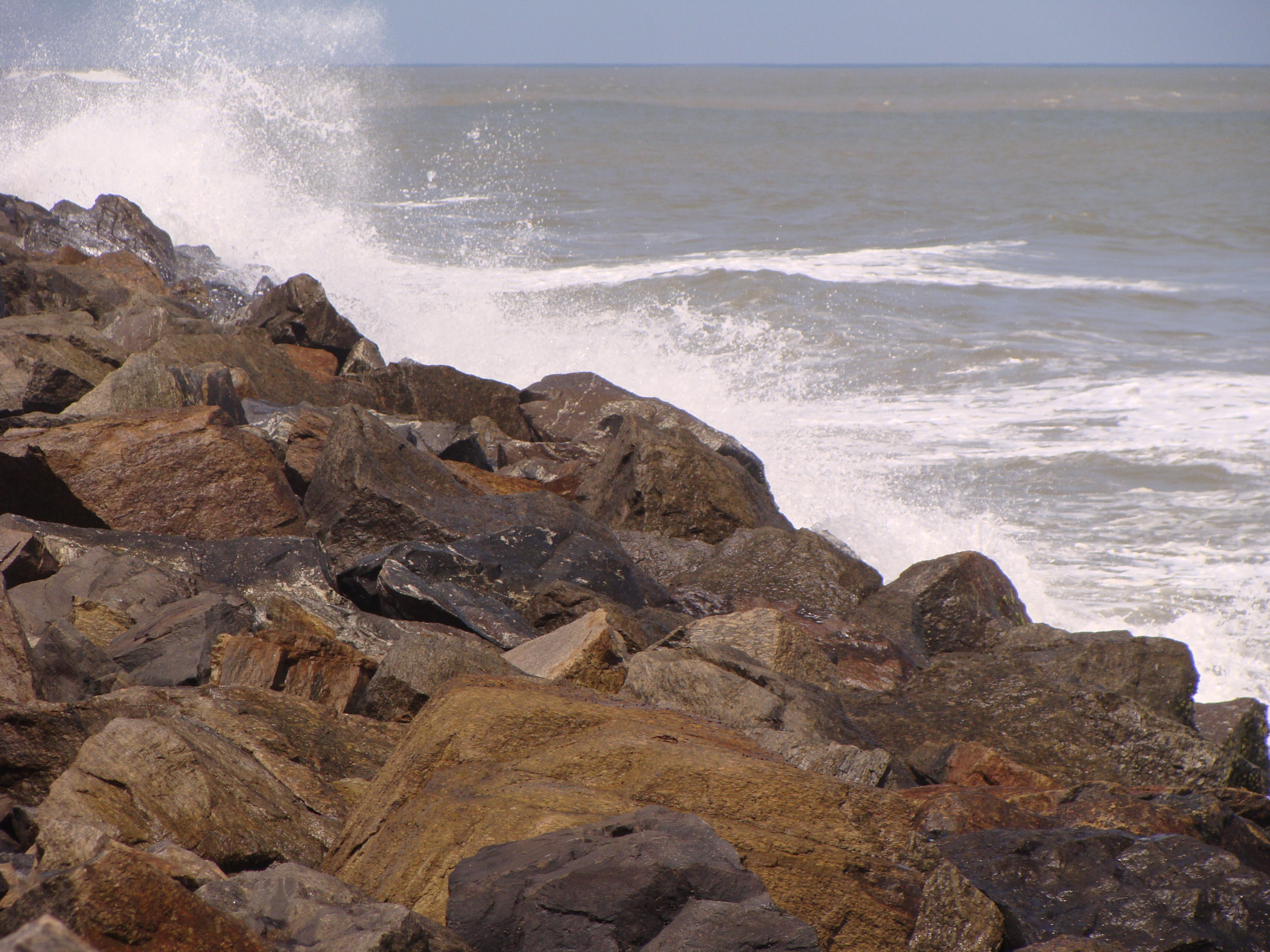
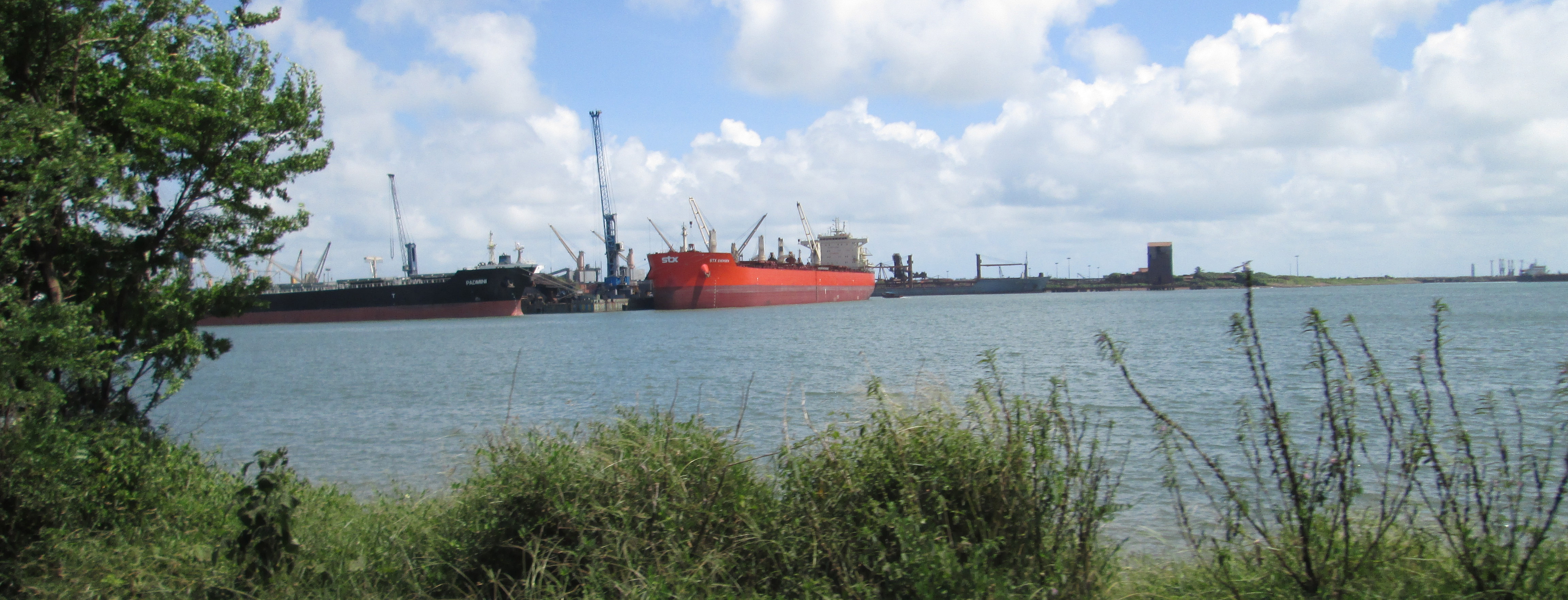
- From Top-Left: Statue of cyclone at Paradeep Beach, Aerial View of Paradeep Port, Sunset at Paradeep Beach, Paradeep Beach, Ship at Paradeep Port, Maa Sarala Temple
- Nickname: Bani Kshetra
- Interactive map of Jagatsinghpur district
- Coordinates: 20.266°N 86.166°E
- Country: India
- State: Odisha
- Established: 1 April 1993; 33 years ago
- Founded by: Government of Orissa
- Headquarters: Jagatsinghpur

Government
  - Collector & District Magistrate: Shri J. Sonal, IAS
  - Superintendent of Police: Rahul P R, I.P.S.
  - MP (Jagatsinghpur): Bibhu Prasad Tarai

Area
  - Total: 1,759 km^{2} (679 sq mi)
- Elevation: 559.31 m (1,835.0 ft)

Population (2011)
  - Total: 1,136,971
  - Density: 646.4/km^{2} (1,674/sq mi)

Languages
  - Official: Odia, English
- Time zone: UTC+5:30 (IST)
- PIN: 754XXX
- Vehicle registration: OD-21
- Sex ratio: 1.038 ♂/♀
- Literacy: 87.1%
- Lok Sabha constituency: Jagatsinghpur (SC)
- Vidhan Sabha constituency: 4: 101-Paradeep 102-Tirtol(SC) 103-Balikuda-Erasama 104-Jagatsinghpur
- Climate: Aw (Köppen)
- Precipitation: 1,501.3 millimetres (59.11 in)
- Website: jagatsinghpur.nic.in

Jagatsinghpur district is one of the thirty districts of Odisha in the eastern coast of India. It became a new district on 1 April 1993 being separated from Cuttack district with its own headquarter in Jagatsinghpur town. Deltaic and partly littoral; the district of Jagatsinghpur is triangular in shape and small in geographical proportions. It is the smallest district in the state and covers a landmass of 1759 km^{2}. It has a history of its own dating back to the 6th century AD, having contemporaneity with the Prachi valley civilization.

== History ==
Jagatsinghpur, being on the Odisha Coastal Plain, has much of the same history as the rest of Coastal Odisha. It was briefly ruled by the Mauryas: several coins from Mauryan period have been found in the district. Afterwards it formed part of the Chedi kingdom of Kharavela. Although Samudragupta conquered the territory during his extensive conquest, no evidence suggests the later Guptas controlled Jagatsinghpur directly. However Gupta support to Buddhist monasteries in the region has been recorded.

The history of Jagatsinghpur comprises the conglomeration of Hindu, Muslim, Maratha and British realms. The East India Company established their arsenals at Hariharpur in 1600. Understanding of the origin of the name of Jagatsinghpur and its nomenclature mostly depends upon the legends. Legend says the name of Jagatsinghpur (formerly Hariharpur) has come into existence as a revenue village, either in Mughal or Maratha rule after the name of Jagatsingh, the son of Bhagat Singh, an Amildar in Cuttack-Puri Sarkar or Cuttack Chakada since 1786. Bhagat Singh worked as an Amildar either in Mughal or Maratha rule. The Maratha administration kept the place under their jurisdiction and appointed Jagat Singh in 1748 to collect revenue. He collected the Peshkush and Nazrana and remained an unchallenged and uninterrupted administrator for a pretty long period.

As per the report of S.L. Maddo, the Settlement Officer, there was a tradition to name some villages after Amildars of that area. Jagatsinghpur had already become a revenue village before 1877 as per the revenue map of Jagatsinghpur village in 1877–78 Settlement. The said legend is partially tenable because of the total that the administrative unit Amil was introduced by Mughal rule which 4 continued during the Maratha rule also. Prior to Maratha rule the name Jagatsinghpur as a village did not exist. The British navigator Bruton who visited this place in 1633 did not mention Jagatsinghpur in his report. The very same place according to him was Hariharapur, a prosperous village. Hariharpur was an important village before the first half of the seventeenth century and it was declared as a Pragana under Cuttack Chakada during Maratha rule. The then Jagatsinghpur revenue village was not so important to be declared as Pragana or Thana till 1817.

During the Paika Vidroha (Rebellion of Paikas) in 1817, Hariharpur was a Thana. The then Jagatsinghpur became more prominent than Hariharpur for which the British administration renamed Hariharpur Thana as Jagatsinghpur Thana. During Maratha rule both Lala Kruparam Roy, Bada Dewan (Senior Dewan) and Lala Haribansa Roy, Sana Dewan (Junior Dewan) were inhabitants of village Lalasahi Jagatsinghpur and by exercising their power and position they reaffirmed their native village as Jagatsinghpur. Jagatsinghpur established its importance after it became a Thana and then the British rule declared Jagatsinghpur as a Sub-division in 1866 but the status of Sub-division was withdrawn in 1874 on account of low revenue collection. After independence, Jagatsinghpur was once more declared as a Revenue Sub-Division in 1967 and subsequently Jagatsinghpur Sub-Division was declared as an independent revenue district in April 1993 by the State Government.

Consequent to the bifurcation of old Cuttack District into four new districts, the Jagatsinghpur District was created on 1 April 1993. The new district was inaugurated by the then Chief Minister Biju Patnaik in an auspicious ceremony. The foundation stone to the District Collectorate was laid in November 1995 by the then Deputy Chief Minister Basant Kumar Biswal and it was inaugurated in November 1997.

=== Independence movement ===
The district had a large contribution to the freedom struggle of the country. It was Gopabandhu Das, the chief animating force, making Congress activities popular in Odisha. From the beginning of his career, he had associated himself with different sessions of the Congress. In 1920, after the special session of the Congress at Kolkata, Gopabandhu decided to carry on Congress programme in Odisha launched by Mahatma Gandhi. The Utkal Provincial Congress Committee was constituted early in 1921 and Gopabandhu became its first president. The arrival of Mahatma Gandhi in Cuttack on 23 March 1921 galvanized the Non-cooperation movement. It was Gopabandhu who translated the speeches of Gandhi which prompted the people to join the Non-cooperation movement. Under his leadership, by 30 June 1921, the Utkal Pradesh Congress Committee collected Rs.21000/- for Tilak Swaraj fund and enrolled 39000 Congress members. To carry out Congress programmes and to train workers and volunteers, Alaka Ashram was established in the district in the year 1922. To establish this Ashram, Gopabandhu Chaudhury, Bhagirathi Mahapatra and Pranakrushna Padhiary acted as the chief mobilizing force. It also became the meeting place of young volunteers (Banarsena) and published a weekly Utkalika edited by Sarala Devi, spreading Congress ideas like boycott of foreign cloth, law court and government institutions etc. The district had its contribution to the Civil Disobedience movement. Gandhiji had started this movement by breaking the salt law on 6 April 1930.

The Salt Satyagraha was a powerful movement in Coastal Odisha. The first batch of Satyagraha, led by Gopabandhu Chaudhury and Acharya Harihar, started for Inchudi from Swaraj Ashram at Cuttack. Kujanga was another important centre of salt Satyagraha. Rama Devi, Malati Devi, Sarala Devi, Rani Bhagyabati Patamahadei and hundreds of women volunteers joined the movement and violated the salt law. The centres of salt Satyagraha in the district were Chatua, Kaliapata, Paradeep, Erasama and Daradia. Apart from the organisation of salt Satyagraha, marches, boycott of foreign cloth, propagation of Khadi, picketing before excise shops and other constructive programmes formed part of the civil disobedience movement. This movement was withdrawn in May 1934. Sarala Devi was the first woman freedom fighter and satyagrahi from Jagatsinghpur in the freedom struggle. On 8 August 1942, the All India Congress Committee in its meeting at Bombay passed the Quit India resolution and gave a call for mass struggle to achieve freedom. Centres of Congress movement like Swaraj Ashram at Cuttack, Bari Ashram at Binjharpur, Alaka Ashram at Jagatsinghpur, Kendupatana Spinning Centre, etc. were declared unlawful. Prominent Congress leaders were taken into custody by 10 August 1942. The Quit India programmes included attack on post offices, police stations, tahasil offices and such other public offices to paralyze the administration and force the British to quit India. Such incidents occurred in the wake of the movements at various places such as Tirtol, Erasama and Jagatsinghpur. It became a forceful movement to make India free. Notable freedom fighter of the district Surendra Nath Dwibedi came to lime light by taking part in the Quit India movement. After years of struggle, finally the country became independent and the district moved forward in the path of modernization and development.

=== Archaeological Importance ===
The District Jagatsinghpur, earlier a part of the Cuttack District is rich in archaeological remains. Coins, inscriptions, images and monuments are main historical antiquities known in the district. Silver, punch marked coins have been reported from the district of Cuttack, Puri, Mayurbhanj, Bolangir and Ganjam. A trove comprising 379 silver punch marked coins was discovered from a hillock at Salipur police station and they belong to Maurya period. In 1931–32, imitations of Kushan coins also known as Puri Kushan coins were discovered from undivided Cuttack district. Odisha was not directly ruled by Guptas although a few gold coins of Guptas were found from the state. In the district of Cuttack, an archer type gold coins of Chandragupta-II, was discovered from Lalitgiri. It has the standing figure of the king as an archer, Garuda standard on the obverse and Goddess Laxmi on the reverse. Gold coins weighing 5 to 7 grains, called Ganga fanams have been discovered from Danduasinghpur under Jagatsinghpur police station. These fanams are attributed to the rulers of the Eastern Ganga dynasty. The various symbols on the obverse include a crouching bull, sankha, chakra etc. while on the reverse ankush, kuthara and some numerals.

The religious belief and rituals of the people find expression in the archaeological monuments of the district which includes temples and images of various pantheons. The temples generally follow the Kalingan temple style in having a curvilinear superstructure for the sanctuary and pidha deula, for the frontal porch. The Lingaraj Mahadeva temple near Balia, on the bank of Biluakhai river, is an important specimen of the early series of the temples and can be assigned to the 8th to 9th centuries. The small Rekha temple is Triratha in plan and has Mahisamardini as one of the Parsvadevatas. The Singhnath Siva temple in an islet of the Mahanadi at Singhnath is the most important Siva temple of the 9th century A.D. The Amangai temple in another island of the Mahanadi near Kandarpur is now in ruins. Its pyramidal Jagmohan seems to be a later addition, but the Deula, pancharatha in plan, is a developed specimen of the Kalingan style. Sathalpur in Jagatsighpur sub-division had a temple for Saptamatruka and the images still exist there. Buddhist images of the district hail from Tarapur and Paradeep garh. The image of Lokeswar at Paradeepgarh, worshipped as Bisnu-Lokanath, is a unique temple of Gajaprustha style.

The department of State Archaeology was set up in 1965. Dr. Nabin Kumar Sahu, an eminent historian had made an initial attempt to make a survey of many important archaeological sites in the district and later Sri P.K. Ray, Superintendent, State Museum had identified 19 old monuments which are still maintained by the State Government. With the grant made available from the 10th and 11th Financial Commission, Sri B.K. Rath, Superintendent, State Archives in his recent survey (2005–2006) has found out a number of monuments in the blocks of Kujang, Balikuda, Naugaon, Tirtol, Jagatsinghpur, Raghunathpur and Biridi which belong to the 7 th century and post 7th century AD. This indicates that a civilization had flourished in this track around 4th and 5th century AD along with the Prachy Civilization on the southern side of the river Devi. Though there has been no excavation so far in this district, old sculptures and archaeological remains are available in plenty in the Lingaraj Temple, Balia; Kundeshwara and Sathalapur, Kosthi, Dhanisho, Kantara, Nasik, Paradeep Garh, Somanatha temple of Chatra, Tirthamatha of Tanra and Nandigram of Naugaon.

Sculptural depictions of Jain Tirthankaras, particularly of Rishabhnath and Parshwanath are found in Nasik (in the temple premises of Khandeswar), Manapur-Gadama (in Raghunathpur Block), Nuadhana in Biridi Block, Sahada (in the temple of Suvarneswara) and in Sujang in the temple of Dhabaleswara. All Tirthankara images found in Jagatsinghpur district are in Kayotsarga Mudra and they probably belong to the 9th −10th century AD. Though no Buddhist Chaitya, Stupa or Vihara have been discovered in this district, a plenty of Buddhist archaeological remains have been traced by various scholars over ages. Dr. Nabin Kumar Sahoo and Professor Donaldson have made an extensive study on the Buddhist images found in Tarapur, Balia, Kamalapur, Baredia, Nasik, Kalyanpur, Dihasahi, Kundeshwar, Kaduapada, Tanra, Paradeep Garh, Mudupur and Marichipur. The four stone sculptures preserved in a newly built temple in Tarapur have been identified as the Buddha in Bhumisparsha mudra, the eight-armed Marichi, Manjubara Manjushree and the last image is goddess Prajna Paramita. In the Bhagavati temple of Balia we find Tara's image. In Kamalapur village there is a five-headed Oddiyana Marichi, cutely standing on a chariot drawn by seven swines. In Kaduapada village we also find another Marichi image. She is eight-armed and is being driven on a chariot by seven swines. In Paradeep Garh we find two temples. In the Pareshwara temple in the northern niche there is Avalokiteshwara Padmapani. The Lokeswara Temple in Paradeep Garh has drawn the attention of many scholars. The sanctum sanctorum has been built following the Buddhist temple architectural plan. It is Gajaprustha as it resembles the back and rear portion of an elephant. This architectural representation is unique in India. The Lokeswara image enshrined in the sanctum sanctorum is four-armed. Buddhist Lokeswara holding a string of beads, a water pitcher and a stump of lotus and the fourth hand showering blessings. Probably this temple belongs to the 8th −9 th century AD. The above narration is merely a brief introduction to the Hindu, Jain and Buddhist monuments in the district of Jagatsinghpur. A panoramic picture is available in the 1st volume of "Jagatsinghpur: Atita O’ Barttamana", compiled by Dr. Bholanath Rout (2006).

== Geography ==
Jagatsinghpur is situated on an elevation of 15 meters (49 feet). It is the smallest district in the state and covers a landmass of 1759 km^{2}. The place lies between 86^{0}3^{'} to 86^{0}45^{'} East Longitude and between 19^{0}58^{'} to 20^{0}23^{'} North latitude. It is predominantly recognized due to its triangular geographical propinquity with the Prachi valley in the south and that of Chitrotpala in the north and is surrounded by the districts of Kendrapara in north, Cuttack in west, Puri in south and Bay of Bengal in East. It enjoys a temperate climate. Winter is cold, while summer is hot and humid. Four major rivers of Odisha irrigate the mainland of Jagatsinghpur. These are the Mahanadi, Kathajodi, Devi and Biluakhai. The district is prone to cyclonic rainfalls during the monsoons. The cyclone of 1999 caused maximum damage in this district. Mahanadi is the longest river in Jagatsinghpur and Alaka, Biluakhai, Hansua, Devi and Paika are among the major rivers which pass through the district. Two main canals are Taladanda & Machhagaon which are chief sources of flow irrigation. Taladanda canal is the longest and largest canal in Odisha. Dug up by the British in 1869, it ran parallel alongside Mahanadi river in Cuttack and dropped in the bay of Bengal in Paradeep. The 85 km long canal was the lifeline of all the adjoining areas like Jagatsinghpur, Chandbali, Jatni and helped the farmers of these areas immensely. The work of the canal was started by Sir Thomas Edward Ravenshaw, then commissioner of Cuttack, the founder of Ravenshaw College.

== Divisions ==
This district is subdivided into 8 tehsils, they are Jagatsinghpur, Kujang, Tirtol, Balikuda, Biridi, Naugaon, Ersama and Raghunathpur. The last four are new tehsils created in 2008 and it is also divided into 8 blocks, 8 Tahasils, 1,321 Revenue Villages, 76 R.I. Circles, 194 gram panchayats, 1320 villages, 13 police stations and two Municipalities functioning in the District.

== Demographics ==
Historical population
Year	Pop.	±% p.a.
1901	385,140	—
1911	394,474	+0.24%
1921	383,388	−0.28%
1931	408,121	+0.63%
1941	427,344	+0.46%
1951	441,539	+0.33%
1961	522,197	+1.69%
1971	641,238	+2.07%
1981	791,717	+2.13%
1991	934,045	+1.67%
2001	1,057,891	+1.25%
2011	1,136,971	+0.72%

Religions in Jagatsinghpur district (2011)
Religion	Percent
Hinduism	95.53%
Islam	4.13%
Other or not stated	0.34%

According to the 2011 census Jagatsinghpur district has a population of 1,136,971, roughly equal to the nation of Cyprus or the US state of Rhode Island. This gives it a ranking of 410th in India (out of a total of 640). The district has a population density of 682 inhabitants per square kilometre (1,770/sq mi). Its population growth rate over the decade 2001–2011 was only 7.5%. Jagatsinghapur has a sex ratio of 968 females for every 1000 males, and an average literacy of 86.59%: 92.38 percent male literacy and 80.6 percent female literacy. 10.20% of the population lives in urban areas. Scheduled Castes and Scheduled Tribes make up 21.83% and 0.69% of the population respectively.

Languages of Jagatsinghpur district (2011)
1. Odia (92.3%)
2. Urdu (3.71%)
3. Bengali (2.44%)
4. Others (1.53%)

At the time of the 2011 Census of India, 92.32% of the population in the district spoke Odia, 3.71% Urdu and 2.44% Bengali as their first language.

== Culture ==
Jagatsinghpur is also known for the Sarala Temple and is known as the cultural heart of Odisha. Sarala Das was a 15th-century poet and scholar of Odia literature, best known for three Odia books — Mahabharata, Vilanka Ramayana and Chandi Purana was born at Kanakavati Patana, known as Kanakapura, one of the Sidhikshetras in Jagatsinghpur district. As an originator of Odia literature, his work has formed an enduring source of information for succeeding generations. The district also has theatre groups which keep the old tradition of live acting before a crowd. The groups have become the part of mainstream entertainment for people all over Odisha. Parbati Gannatya, Benirampur opera, Gouri Gananatya, Tulasi Gananatya, Durgashree Gananatya, Tarapur Opera and Trinath Gananatya are some of the local theatre groups of Jagatsinghpur district attuned the opera culture.

== Climate and rainfall ==
The climate is hot in summer and high humidity almost round the year and good annual rainfall is the main feature of this district. The average annual rainfall of the district is about 1514.6 mm. The maximum and minimum temperature is 38 degree C and 12 degree C respectively. About 80–83% of the annual rainfall occurs during the monsoon period. The average rainy days are about 72 in the district. The rainfall is largely due to southwest monsoon. The district's rainfall is mainly erratic, uneven and long dry spell causes agricultural drought. The monthly relative humidity in the district varies from 62% in April–May to 83% in August. The RH reaches as high as 93% and often above 80% in monsoon period.

== Economy ==
The economy of the Jagatsinghpur district is dependent on agriculture, the main occupation of bulk of the population. 70 percent of the total population depends upon agriculture and agro–based productions. The key crops of the district are paddy, sugarcane, turmeric, cotton and jute. Processing, manufacturing, repairing and fisheries industries also contribute towards the economic development. Jagatsinghpur is a leading district of the state in terms of industrialization. It is having 120 secondary industries, 5 cottage industries, 603 nos. of Handloom industries, 9 large / medium scale industries and a few in the process of installation in the district. Paradip, a modern deep water port, was built here in the 1960s and has now become a hot business destination due to the large foreign direct investment. The port town of the district has already emerged as one of the country's major investment hot spot by attracting investment in excess of the tune of 3.5 lakhs crores (US$68.84 billion) including the Rs 2,74,134 crore Petroleum Chemicals and Petrochemical Investment Region (PCPIR) which has spread over 284 square kilometres (110 mi^{2}) in the area. IOC has already installed a 15 million tonnes per year refinery cum petrochemical complex at Paradip. Indian Railways has also taken up the Paradeep-Haridaspur 82 km broad gauge line to boost the infrastructure in the region. Up-gradation of NH-5(A) is also going on in a very fast rate. A new all green field road will also be built from Bhubaneswar to Paradip.

Economically it is a self sufficient state gearing economic evolution of the nation. For the year 2017–18, a total of Rs. 38720.87 lakhs is proposed for the district under central plan, centrally sponsored plan and State plan. 62% of the plan outlays may come from State budget which includes State Plan and State Share of CSP including flagship programs like RKVY, MGNREGS, GGY, IAY etc. and the remaining, 38% will be available as Central Share [CS] of CSP and Central Plan [CP].

== Education ==
The district has a total number of 1456 primary schools, 661 Upper primary schools and 324 Secondary schools. In addition to these the district has 35 Junior colleges and 18 Degree colleges. The prominent among them is the SVM Autonomous College. This was established in the year 1963. It offers undergraduate courses in Arts, Science and Commerce and undergraduate Self Financial Courses such as BBA & BCA. Other notable educational institutes of the District are S.K.Academy School, Adikabi Sarala Das Mahavidyalaya, Tirtol, Sidha Baranga Junior College of Education and Technology, Punanga, Tulasi GadiBramha Women's College, Kaduapada, Biju Patnaik (Junior) College Ashrampatna, Paradeep College Paradeep, Government Polytechnic, Balikuda College, Alaka Mahabidyalaya, Swagatika College of Science and Education Jagatsinghpur.

== Health ==
The district has one district headquarter hospital, 17 homeopathic hospitals, 9 Community Health Centers, 37 P.H.Cs, and 12 Ayurveda Dispensaries. There are 268 beds in all 20 hospitals and 8 ICDS project is operating in the district. As per the Odisha Human Development Report 2004, Jagatsinghpur occupied 19th rank in Human Development Index, 3rd rank in Infrastructural Development Index(2000–2001) and 4th rank in development of health infrastructure during 1999–2000.

== Transportation ==
It has 10.40 km of National/Express Highway, 133 km of State Highway, 41 km of MDRs, 225.90 km of ODRs, 1570 km of GP roads, 808 km of PS roads and 736.04 km rural roads. The railway line from Cuttack links Paradip covering 68.12 km of Broad Gauge line with 9 railway stations. The nearest railway station from Jagatsinghpur town is Gorakhnath Railway Station which is about 10 km from Jagatsinghpur. Train service is not frequent, it is better to go by road. Nearest airport is Biju Patnaik International Airport at Bhubaneswar which is about 70 km from Jagatsinghpur. Charter air service from Biju Patnaik International Airport to Paradip is provided by Pawan Hans. Jagatsinghpur is well connected with other cities via road. Ministry of Road Transport and Highways, Government of India has decided to link Jagatsinghpur with a new national highway. There is frequent bus services to Jagatsinghpur form Bhubaneswar, Cuttack, Paradip, Machhagaon, Naugaon, Naharana, Baharana, Tandikul, Katara, Sidhala, Rourkela, Puri, Kakatapur, Balasore, Bhadrak and all other important cities in Odisha. Jagatsinghpur is situated 40 km from Cuttack and 60 km from Bhubaneswar.

== Temples ==
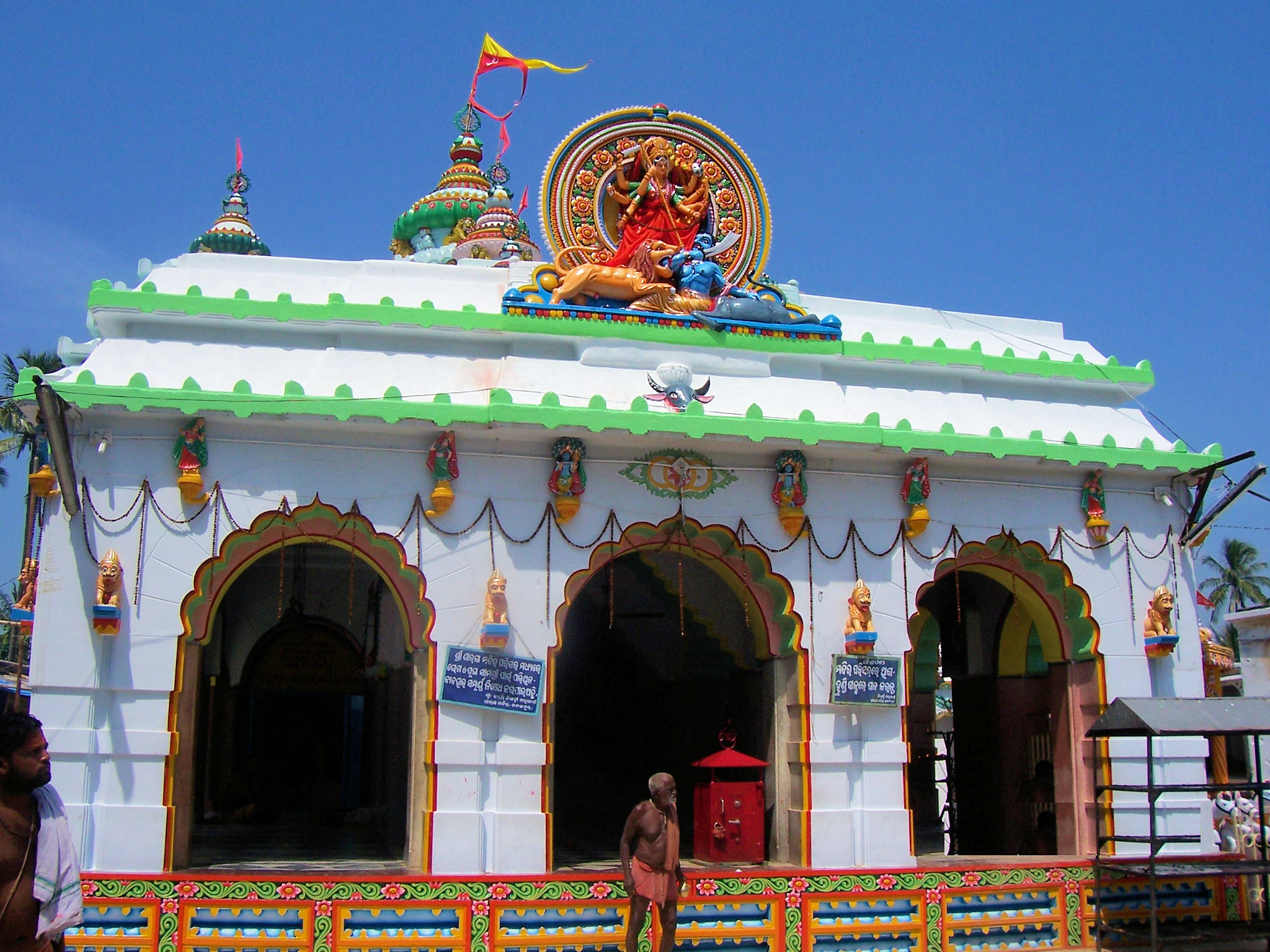
Sarala temple, Jagatsinghpur

- Sarala Pitha (Jhankad): Jhankad is the sanctum sanctorum of Goddess Sarala, regarded as one of the most spiritually elevated expressions of Shaktism. Believed as a synthesis of divine figure of Durga and Saraswati, the culture of Sarala is an amalgamation of three principal Hindu cults namely Vedic, Tantrik and Vaishnavite. It is one of the eight most famous Shakta shrines of Odisha. It is also associated with the first epic poet of Odisha, Adikabi Sarala Dasa of the 15th century AD.

- Gorakhnath Temple (Jagatsinghpur): Gorakhnath Temple is a Hindu temple in Jagatsinghpur district, Odisha, dedicated to Guru Gorakhnath of the Nath tradition. It is a local place of worship visited by devotees, especially during Hindu festivals linked with Shaivite practices.

== Politics ==
=== Vidhan Sabha constituencies ===
The following is the 4 Vidhan sabha constituencies of Jagatsinghpur district and the elected members of those places.

No.	Constituency	Reservation	Extent of the Assembly Constituency (Blocks)	Member of 15th Assembly	Party
101	Paradeep	None	Paradeep (M), Kujang, Tirtol (part)	Sampad Chandra Swain	BJP
102	Tirtol	SC	Biridi, Raghunathpur, Tirtol (part)	Ramakanta Bhoi	BJD
103	Balikuda-Erasama	None	Balikuda, Erasama	Sharada Prasad Jena	BJD
104	Jagatsinghpur	None	Jagatsinghpur (M), Jagatsinghpur, Naugaon	Amarendra Das	BJP

== Notable people ==
The district, smallest in size among the 30 districts in Odisha, has been home to several notable people:

- Jyotirmayee Dash - Academician, Scientist & Chemist
- Prana Krushna Parija – botanist
- Amitav Acharya-American Academist
- Arijit Pasayat- (Retd) Judge of the Supreme Court of India.
- Sarala Das-Father of Odia literature & one of the Panchasakhas
- Gopal Chhotray-playwright & pioneer of modern Odia theatre,
- Pratibha Ray-writer & winner of Jnanpith Award
- Bibhuti Patnaik- Odia novelist
- Devdas Chhotray-1st vice-chancellor of Ravenshaw University
- Nabakrushna Choudhury-Ex CM of Odisha
- Ramadevi Choudhury-Freedom fighter
- Malati Choudhury-Civil rights activist
- Nityanand Kanungo-politician,
- Annapurna Choudhury-Independence & women's right activist
- Sarala Devi-Feminist & social activist
- Debasis Mohanty-Indian Cricketer
- Dukhiram Swain-Odia actor
- Akshaya Mohanty-Odia musician
- Brahmananda Panda-Ex MP
- Akshay Parija-Odia film maker & an alumnus of Harvard Business School
- Jasobanta Dasa-One of the Panchasakhas
- Achyuta Samanta- Educationist & MP
- Gopabandhu Choudhury-Freedom Fighter
