= Sarala Temple =

Hindu temple

Maa Sarala
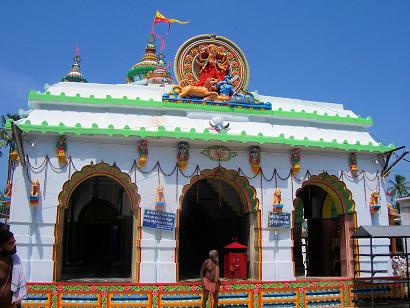

- Odisha

Religion
- Affiliation: Hinduism
- District: Jagatsinghpur

Location
- State: Odisha
- Country: India
- Interactive map of Maa Sarala
- Coordinates: 20.279695°N 86.293658°E

The Maa Sarala Temple (also known as Jhankad Sarala Temple) is a Hindu temple in the district of Jagatsinghpur, Odisha, India, dedicated to Goddess Adishakti.
