= Jagatsinghpur Assembly constituency =

Constituency of the Odisha legislative assembly in India

Coordinates: 20.26°N 86.17°E

Jagatsinghpur
- Constituency No. 104 for the Odisha Legislative Assembly
- Jagatsinghpur Assembly constituency in Jagatsinghpur district

Constituency details
- Country: India
- Region: East India
- State: Odisha
- Division: Central Division
- District: Jagatsinghpur
- Lok Sabha constituency: Jagatsinghpur
- Established: 1961
- Total electors: 2,20,988 (Note: as on 2024) (Note: as data published by election commission)
- Reservation: None

Member of Legislative Assembly
- 17th Odisha Legislative Assembly
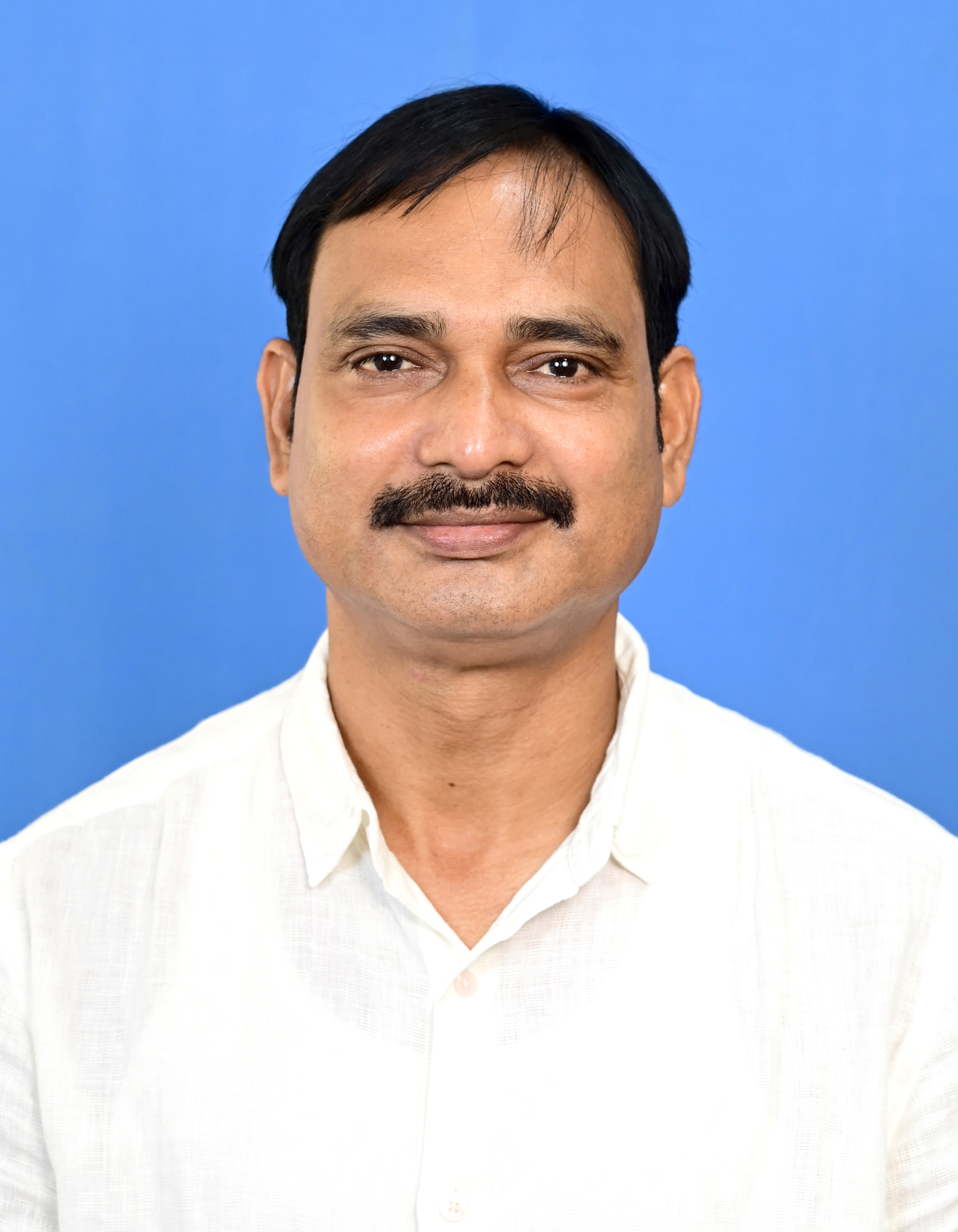
- Incumbent Amarendra Das
- Party: Bharatiya Janata Party
- Elected year: 2024

Jagatsinghpur is a Vidhan Sabha constituency of Jagatsinghpur district, Odisha.

This constituency includes Jagatsinghpur (M), Jagatsinghpur block and Naugaon block.

== Elected members ==
Vote share of winning candidates
2024	54.34%
2019	43.29%
2014	43.34%
2009	50.64%
2004	51.72%
2000	65.87%
1995	48.71%
1990	65.36%
1985	53.16%
1980	43.91%
1977	54.62%

Since its formation in 1951, 18 elections were held till date including one bypoll in 1959. It was a 2-member constituency for 1957.

List of members elected from Jagatsinghpur constituency are:

Year	Member	Party
2024	Amarendra Das	Bharatiya Janata Party
2019	Prasanta Kumar Muduli	Biju Janata Dal
2014	Chiranjib Biswal	Indian National Congress
2009	Bishnu Charan Das	Biju Janata Dal
2004	Bishnu Charan Das	Biju Janata Dal
2000	Bishnu Charan Das	Biju Janata Dal
1995	Bishnu Charan Das	Janata Dal
1990	Bishnu Charan Das	Janata Dal
1985	Krushna Chandra Mallick	Indian National Congress
1980	Krushna Chandra Mallick	Indian National Congress (I)
1977	Kanduri Charan Mallik	Janata Party
1974	Lakshman Mallick	Indian National Congress
1971	Lakshman Mallick	Indian National Congress (R)
1967	Kanduri Charan Mallik	Praja Socialist Party
1961	Priyanath Dey	Indian National Congress
1959 (bypoll) (Note: Death of Nilamani Pradhan)	Bira Kishore Das	Indian National Congress
1957 (Note: It was a 2 member constituency)	Nilamani Pradhan	Indian National Congress
1957	Kanduri Charan Mallik	Praja Socialist Party
1951	Nilamani Pradhan	Indian National Congress

== Election results ==
=== 2024 ===
Voting were held on 1 June 2024 in 4th phase of Odisha Assembly Election & 7th phase of Indian General Election. Counting of votes was on 4 June 2024. In 2024 election, Bharatiya Janata Party candidate Amarendra Das defeated Biju Janata Dal candidate Prasanta Kumar Muduli by a margin of 22,138 votes.

2024 Odisha Vidhan Sabha Election, Jagatsinghpur
Party	Candidate	Votes	%	±%
BJP	Amarendra Das	92,555	54.34	
BJD	Prasanta Kumar Muduli	70,417	41.34	
INC	Pratima Mallick	5,932	3.48	
NOTA	None of the above	402	0.24	
Majority		22,138	13.00	
Turnout		1,70,334	77.08	
BJP gain from BJD				

=== 2019 ===
In 2019 election, Biju Janata Dal candidate Prasanta Kumar Muduli defeated Indian National Congress candidate Chiranjib Biswal by a margin of 8,642 votes.

2019 Odisha Vidhan Sabha Election, Jagatsinghpur
Party	Candidate	Votes	%	±%
BJD	Prasanta Kumar Muduli	70,116	43.29	
INC	Chiranjib Biswal	61,474	37.95	
BJP	Satyabrata Mohapatra	28,639	17.68	
NOTA	None of the above	584	0.36	
Majority		8,642	5.34	
Turnout		1,61,969	75.74	
BJD gain from INC				

=== 2014 ===
In 2014 election, Indian National Congress candidate Chiranjib Biswal defeated Biju Janata Dal candidate Bishnu Charan Das by a margin of 2,888 votes.

2014 Vidhan Sabha Election, Jagatsinghpur
Party	Candidate	Votes	%	±%
INC	Chiranjib Biswal	67,067	43.34	▲0.28
BJD	Bishnu Charan Das	64,179	41.47	▼9.17
Independent	Satyabrata Mohapatra	8,844	5.71	
BJP	Pratap Kumar Mishra	7,058	4.56	▲0.9
NOTA	None of the above	568	0.37	
Majority		2,888	0.18	
Turnout		1,54,757	79.8	▲9.8
Registered electors		1,93,927		
INC gain from BJD				

=== 2009 ===
In 2009 election, Biju Janata Dal candidate Bishnu Charan Das defeated Indian National Congress candidate Chiranjib Biswal by a margin of 10,077 votes.

2009 Vidhan Sabha Election, Jagatsinghpur
Party	Candidate	Votes	%	±%
BJD	Bishnu Charan Das	67,299	50.64	▼1.08
INC	Chiranjib Biswal	57,222	43.06	▲2.82
BJP	Upendranath Biswal	4,864	3.66	−
Majority		10,077	7.58 (Note: %of total valid votes)	−
Turnout		1,33,017	70.00	▼1.21
Registered electors		1,90,024		
BJD hold				
