= Ranjib Biswal =

Indian cricketer and politician

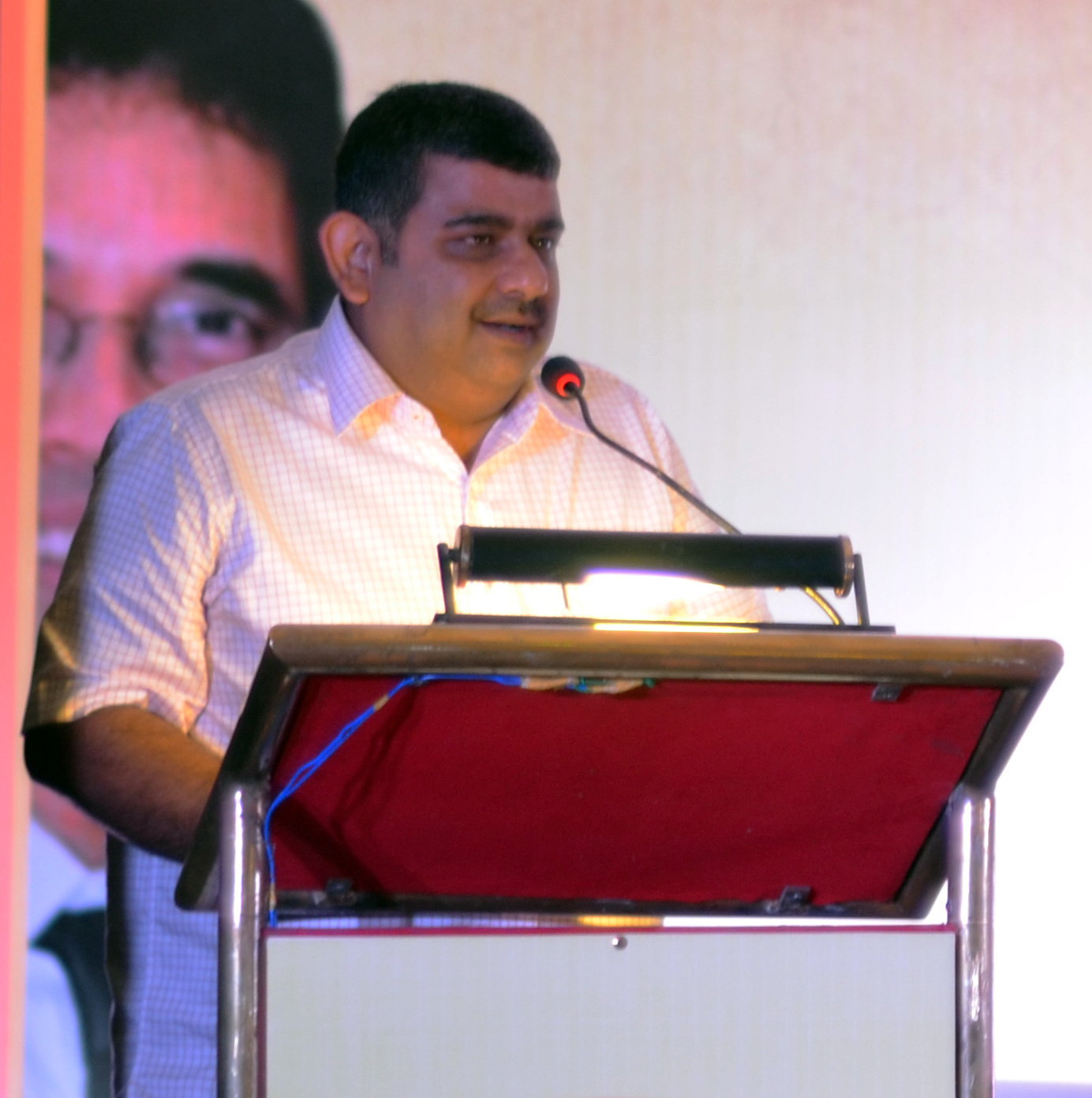
- Ranjib Biswal in Bhubaneswar

Member of Parliament Rajya Sabha
- In office 3 April 2014 – 2 April 2020
- Preceded by: Ramachandra Khuntia
- Succeeded by: Sujeet Kumar
- Constituency: Odisha

Personal details
- Born: Ranjib Biswal; 21 September 1970 (age 55) Cuttack, Odisha, India
- Party: Indian National Congress
- Spouse: Anita Mohanty
- Education: St. Stephens College, New Delhi, Stewart School, Cuttack
- Occupation: Cricketer, Politician, Administrator
- Known for: Manager, Indian Cricket Team; Chairman, IPL; President, Odisha Cricket Association

Ranjib Biswal (born 21 September 1970) is a former Indian cricketer and a former chairman of Indian Premier League. He played domestic cricket for the Odisha and represented India in Under-19 cricket, captaining the side against Pakistan in four test matches played in India.

After retiring from domestic cricket in 1997, Biswal has become an administrator and was made a member of the selection committee (representing East Zone) in 2005 under Kiran More. In 2006, when the committee was re-formed under Dilip Vengsarkar, Ranjib Biswal was retained for an additional term in 2006.

In 2006, Shri Ranjib Biswal was entrusted with the additional responsibility of Manager with D Dongoankar for the IND tour of WI – 2006. He was also held the position of Chairman National Cricket Academy (NCA) and President of Odisha Cricket Association (OCA). He was the member and Team Manager of the 2011 World Cup and the 2013 Champions Trophy winning, Indian Cricket Team. Later in September 2013, Shri Ranjib Biswal elevated as the chairman of IPL and he held the post till April 2015. In January 2017, he stepped down from the post of OCA President.

On 3 April 2014 to 2 April 2020, Shri Ranjib Biswal (Congress) elected as Rajya Sabha MP from Odisha. He chaired various Parliamentary Committee during his tenure.

== Personal life ==
Ranjib Biswal is the son of the Odisha politician and former Odisha deputy chief minister the late Basant Kumar Biswal.

His elder brother Shri Chiranjib Biswal is a former Congress MLA from Jagatsinghpur constituency.

Ranjib Biswal is married to Anita Mohanty, an NRI from Manchester, United Kingdom

== Political positions held ==
- Member of Parliament, Rajya Sabha, Odisha
- Member of Standing Committee on Coal and Steel.
- Former Member of Consultative Committee on Petroleum and Natural Gas.
- Member of Telecom Authority Committee, Bhubaneswar Circle.
- Member of parliament for 11th and 12th Lok Sabha
- Member of standing committee for Science & Technology, Environment & Forest
- Member of consultative committee for Coal
- Member of Speaker's delegation to Russia
- Member to represent India at international Parliamentarian Union in Brussels as a member of parliament
- Member of TAC & ZRUC
- Visited USA under USAI programme as a parliament member from India
- Treasurer of Indian Youth Congress
- General Secretary of Indian Youth Congress
- President of Orissa Pradesh Youth Congress
- AICC Member

== Sports positions held ==
- President, Orissa Cricket Association
- Chairman, Indian Premier League
- Member, Indian Premier League Governing Council
- Manager, Indian Cricket Team, CWC 2011 and CT 2013
- Member, Finance, Marketing and Corporate Cricket, BCCI
- Member, Technical Committee, BCCI
- Senior Selector, Indian Cricket Team, BCCI
- National Selector, National Cricket Academy, BCCI
- Captain, Under -19 Indian Cricket Team, for Tour to Pakistan, Asia Cup, Australia and New-Zealand.
- Captain, Orissa Ranji Trophy
- Played Duleep and Deodhar Trophy for East Zone
- Played WILLS trophy for Board President XI & WILLS XI

== Other positions held ==
- Former Managing Editor of a leading Oriya Daily Newspaper named "The Samaya" and "Samaya Saptahik" in Orissa
- Worked as an Executive with SAIL

== Education ==
- Post Graduate, St. Stephens College, New Delhi.
- Stewart School, Cuttack
