= Gopal Chhotray =

Indian playwright

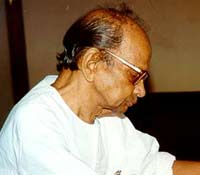
- Chhotray in late 2002
- Born: 20 April 1916; Puranagarh, Jagatsinghpur, Bihar and Orissa Province, India
- Died: 22 January 2003 (aged 86); Bhubaneswar, Odisha
- Occupation: Writer
- Children: Devdas Chhotray, Kasturi
- Writing career
- Language: Odia
- Notable work: Hasyarasara Nataka
- Notable awards: Padma Shri; Sahitya Akademi Award

Gopal Chhotray (20 April 1916 – 22 January 2003) was an Indian dramatist and playwright. He was born in Puranagarh village of Jagatsinghpur district in Bihar and Orissa Province, India.

He is considered to be one of the chief architects of modern Oriya theatre. He brought in significant changes in the morphology of Oriya plays, both in theme and structure. He rescued them from the hold of opera and melodrama, and the overbearing influence of neighbouring Bengal.

== Life ==
Gopal Chhotray dominated the Oriya professional theatre for more than three decades. Beginning with Pheria (Come Back) in 1946, he wrote more than 15 original stage plays and 8 adaptations of eminent Oriya novels, most of which were runaway success in professional stage. There were days, when both the professional theaters of Cuttack, holding daily shows, used to stage his plays concurrently.

Apart from adapting works of eminent Odia novelists like Upendra Kishore Das (Mala Janha), Basanta Kumari Patnaik (Amadabata), Kanhu Charana Mohanty (Jhanja) and former Chief Minister of Odisha Dr. Harekrushna Mahtab (Pratibha), he also adapted Sarat Chandra Chattopadhyay's ‘Ramer Sumati’, Henrik Ibsen's 'Enemy of the People', A A Milne's 'Man in the Bowler Hat', Henry Fielding's 'Mock Doctor', and the English thriller 'The Evil That Men Do'.

Gopal Chhotray was associated with All India Radio (AIR), Cuttack since its inception in 1948. After years of writing as a freelancer, he joined AIR, Cuttack as an in-house script writer in 1956 and worked till 1975.

He wrote more than half a thousand radio plays, including musicals and features, and made listening to his works a household habit. His monthly serial 'Purapuri Paribarika'(Entirely A Family Matter), which ran uninterrupted for three years, was perhaps the earliest chain-play the AIR produced.

While in Radio, Gopal Chhotray made a unique contribution to the Odia musical tradition by reviving rural opera, which had gone out of fashion, and was frowned by the city bred and puritans. He brought both popularity and respectability for this genre by adapting them for broadcast by the AIR in 1960. He restored Baisnab Pani, the doyen of Odia Jatra, to his legitimacy and started an upsurge in musical plays by building up a large repertoire, consisting of his own originals and adaptations.

He has nearly twenty LP records and cassettes of his own work including the all-time best 'Srimati Samarjani' which he produced for the radio with Akshaya Mohanty, based on Fakir Mohan Senapati's short story 'Patent Medicine'. It continues to be a listening rage even after 40 years.

He was also pivotal in designing the dramatic contents of the Odisha Doordarshan when TV came to the State. He nurtured its foundation at Cuttack and continued to sustain it after it shifted to Bhubaneswar. He scripted nearly a hundred plays and features for the State TV, including serials and a memorable mythological called 'Devi Durga'.

== Career ==
He started his career as an amateur stage artist in Bharati Theatres in Cuttack, but soon became the foremost playwright and film script writer for the Odia stage and films respectively. After 'Pheria', his early plays in the 50s, such as 'Bharasa' and 'Para Kalam', were recognized as unique creations. His instant recognition for film script writing came with the production of the mega mythological 'Sri Jagannath' in 1950. In the next thirty five years, he wrote screenplays and dialogues for a number of 'middle of the road' cinemas, combining class and box office hits. 'Amadabata', 'Kie Kahara', 'Matira Manisha' and 'Badhu Nirupama' had received high critical acclaim for his dialogues and treatment.

When professional theatre withered away in Odisha and the State radio lost out its monopoly to private broadcasting and TV channels of doubtful quality, Gopal Chhotray, devoted himself to writing of short stories to respond to his creative urge. He published two volumes of his work, comprising about thirty stories, which were actually embryonic of the plays and films he wanted to write but could not.

Apart from several State awards like Sarala Samman, Bisuva Samman and Governor's Plaque of Honour (1991), he received the Kendriya Sahitya Akademi Award in 1982 and Kendriya Sangeet Natak Academi Award in 1987.

Gopal Chhotray spent his entire life in Cuttack. 2016 would be the centenary year of his birth.

== Publications ==
=== Plays ===
1. Sahadharmini (1942)
2. Pheria (1946)
3. Bharasa (1954)
4. Parakalama (1955)
5. Nasta Urvashi (1955)
6. Shankha Sindura (1956)
7. Pathikabandhu (1958)
8. Jhanja (1958)
9. Janashatru (1958)
10. Ardhangini (1959)
11. Amadabata (1959)
12. Ghataka (1960)
13. Malajanha (1961)
14. Abhaginira Swarga (1961)
15. Pratibha (1962)
16. Sadhana (1962)
17. Purapuri Paribarika (1964)
18. Dalabehera (1966) 19. Padmalaya (1972) 20. Shriharinka Sangsara (1974) 21. Shakha Prashakha (1977) 22. Nua Bou (1980) 23. Hasyarasara Nataka (1981) 24. Shataranji (1983) 25. Babaji (1984) 26. Shobha (1987) 27. Emiti Hue Nahin (1990) 28. Natakhata Nataka (1991) 29. Srestha Ekankika (1991) 30. Pahacha O Anya Nataka (1991) 31. Gajapati Heera O Anyanya (1991) 32. Babu Chandramani (1992) 33. Patent Medicine (1992) 34. Panchanatika (1993)

=== Musicals ===
1. Gansesha (1972) 2. Napahu Rati (1972) 3. Mahishamardini (1972) 4. Tinoti Apera Ekatra (1972) 5. Shrimati Samarjani (1974) 6. Gharabara Dekha (1977) 7. Bindu Sagara (1979) 8. Sampurna Ramayana (1980) 9. Sita, Laba-Kusha (1980) 10. Panchabati (1981) 11. Janmastami (1982) 12. Shree Jagannatha (1983) 13. Bole Hun Ti (1983) 14. Meera Bai (1988) 15. Ajodhya Kanda (1988) 16. Champuvinoda (1988) 17. Kapatapasha (1989) 18. Chhotray Geetinatya Sankalana (Anthology of Musicals)

=== Collections of stories ===
1. Sei Phula (1989) 2. Chandramukhi (1993)

=== Filmography ===
1. Shree Jagannatha (1950) 2. Maa (1958) 3. Nua Bou (1962) 4. Amada Bata (1964) 5. Abhinetri (1965) 6. Matira Manisha (1967) 7. Kie Kahara (1968) 8. Bandhan (1969) 9. Adina Megha (1970) 10. Dharitri (1973) 11. Ramayana (1980) 12. School Master (1985) 13. Badhu Nirupama (1985)

== Awards ==
- Padma Shri, 2002
- Sarala Award, 2000
- Bisuba Award, 1992
- Sahitya Akademi Award, 1982
- Odisha Sahitya Akademi awards, 1976
- Kendriya Sangeet Natak Akademi
