= Chiranjib Biswal =

Indian politician

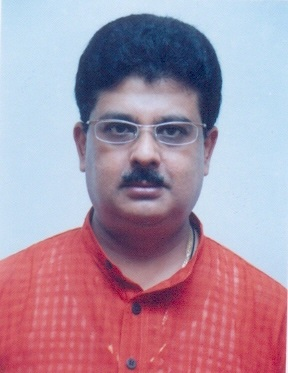
Chiranjib Biswal

Chiranjib Biswal (born 2 January 1963) is a former Indian cricketer and politician belonging to the Indian National Congress party from Odisha, currently MLA from the 104- Jagatsinghpur constituency, and deputy opposition leader of the Odisha assembly. He is the elder son of former deputy chief minister of Odisha, the late Basant Kumar Biswal. He has also previously been a member of the legislative assembly from Tirtol and Jagatsinghpur assembly constituencies and is also the treasurer of the Odisha Pradesh Congress Committee. He has also been the Vice President of OPCC and has served in its various committees. He is also a member of the All India Congress Committee (AICC). He is the elder brother of IPL chairman and Member of Parliament Ranjib Biswal..

Biswal also played domestic cricket for the Odisha cricket team from the 1981/82 till the 1983/84 season.
