= Sarala Dasa =

Odia poet and writer

Adi Kabi Sarala Dasa
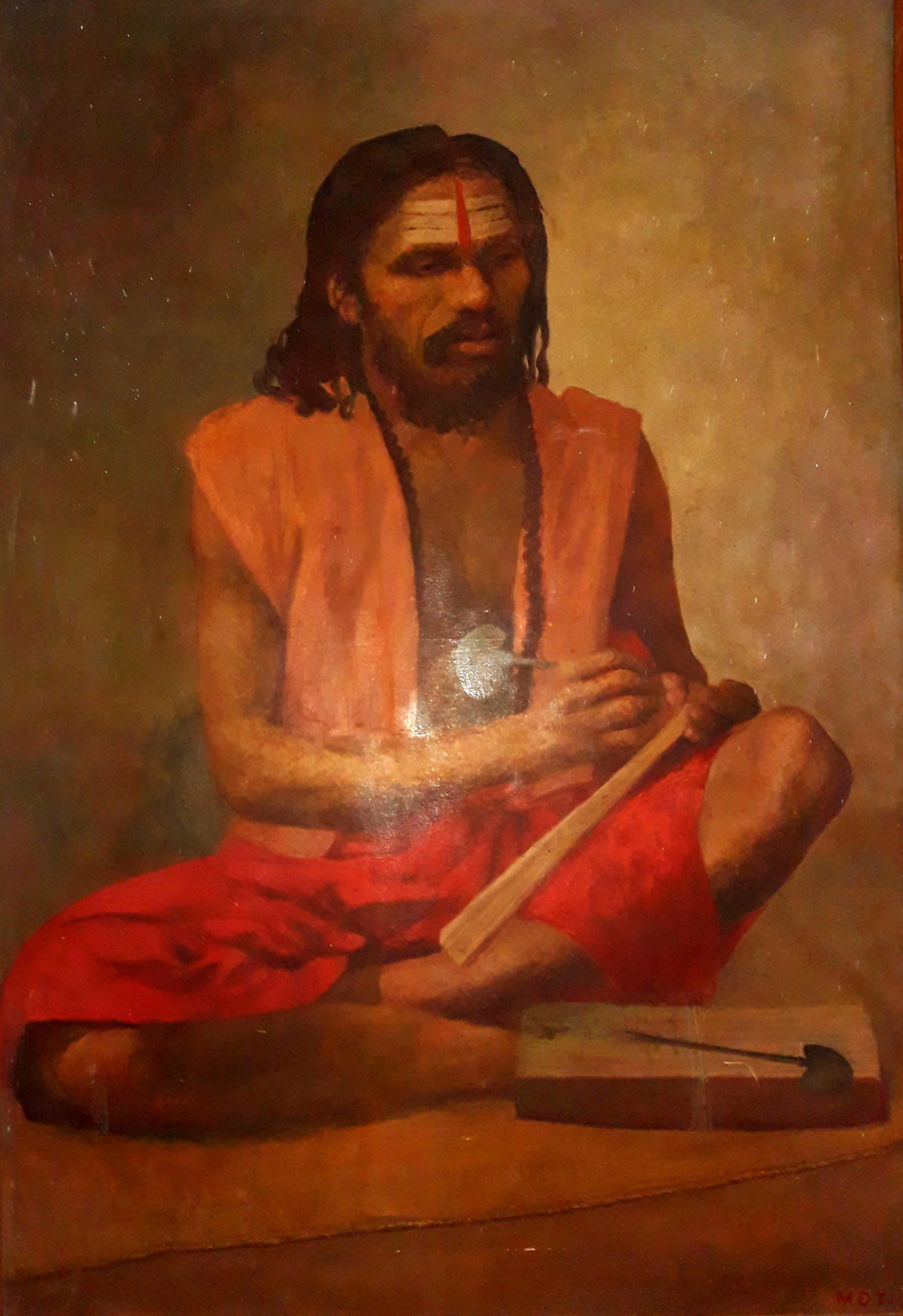
- Born: Siddheswara Parida; 15th century Tentulipada, Jagatsinghpur
- Occupation: Poet • Scholar
- Writing career
- Period: Sarala juga
- Notable works: Mahabharata, Vilanka Ramayana and Chandi Purana

Sarala Dasa (born as Siddheswara Parida) was a 15th-century poet and scholar of Odia literature. Best known for three Odia books — Sarala Mahabharata, Vilanka Ramayana and Chandi Purana — he was the first scholar to write in Odia and his revered as the Adi Kabi (First Poet) of Odia literature. As an originator of Odia literature, his work has formed an enduring source of information for succeeding generations.

== Life ==
The early life of Sarala Dasa is not accurately known. He was a contemporary of the Gajapati King Kapilendra Deva. Though the date of his birth cannot be accurately determined, he can safely be placed to the 15th century AD. He was born at a village called kanakavati patana known as Kanakapura at the Tentuliapada, Jagatsinghpur district. Sarala Dasa belonged to Chasa community.

Sarala Dasa had no organized early education, and what he achieved through self-education was attributed to the grace of Sarala, goddess of devotion and inspiration. Though his early name was Siddheswara Parida, he was later known as Sarala Dasa, or 'by the boon of Sarala'. (The title Dasa means a slave or a servant of a particular god or goddess. A long list of poets, preceding and succeeding Sarala Dasa, have names ending this way. For example: Vatra Dasa, Markanda Dasa, Sarala Dasa, Jagannatha Dasa, Balarama Dasa, and Yasovanta Dasa.) A story – similar to those told of other Indian poets, such as Kalidasa, supposedly illiterate in early life until helped by the goddess Saraswati – tells that Siddheswara as a boy was once ploughing his father's field and singing so melodiously that the goddess Sarala stopped and listened to his song and endowed him with her power of composing beautiful poems.

There are several indications in his Mahabharata that he served as a soldier in the army of the Gajapati King of Odisha.

Sarala Dasa spent his last time at Bila Sarala but the native place Kanakavati Patana known as Kanakapura at Tentuliapada with a religious establishment known as Munigoswain, which marks as the traditional spot, where he composed his works. This period of his lifetime was known as the medieval period.

== Works ==
As well as the three books for which he is best known – Sarala Mahabharata, Vilanka Ramayana and Chandi Purana - Sarala Dasa also wrote the book Laxmi Narayana Vachanika. The Adi Parva Mahabharata opens with a long invocation addressed to the Lord Jagannatha of Puri, from which it is known that Sarala Dasa started writing his Mahabharata in the reign of Kapileswar, otherwise known as Kapilendra Deva, the famous Gajapati king of Odisha (AD 1435–67). He tells us that " କଳିକାଳ ଧ୍ଵଂସନକୁ ଭୋଗ କୋଟି ପୁଜା, ପ୍ରଣମିତେ ଖଟଇ କପିଳେଶ୍ୱର ରାଜା" Or Maharaja Kapilesvara with innumerable offerings and many a salute was serving this great deity and hereby destroying the sins of the Kali age.

Though Sarala Dasa followed the main outline of the Sanskrit Mahabharata in writing the Odia Mahabharata, he made numerous deviations and added to it copiously the stories of his own creation and various other matters known to him. In the final form Sarala Dasa's Mahabharata is a new creation analogous to Kalidasa's Raghuvamsa based on the Ramayana.

Mahabharata brought to light about the 18 parvas. The Chandi Purana was based on the well-known story of Goddess Durga killing Mahishasura (the buffalo headed demon) given in Sanskrit literature but here also the Odia poet chose to deviate from the original at several points. His earliest work, Vilanka Ramayana, was a story of the fight between Rama and Shahasrasira Ravana (thousand headed Ravana).

He wrote the poems in Dandi chand (in which chand the number of letters in the verses is not fixed is called as dandi chand). The verse of Sarala Dasa is simple, forceful and musical, without artificiality. Applying colloquial words for his poetical purpose, his writing was free from Sanskritisation. His work can be seen as adapting the popular oral conventions of earlier Odia folk songs which were used in folk dances such as the Ghoda-nacha (Horse Dance), Dandanacha and Sakhinacha (Puppet Dance). One metrical peculiarity of these songs is that both the lines of a verse do not contain an equal number of letters though the last letters of both the lines produce the same sound. All Sarala Dasa's works were composed with this metrical peculiarity, and so the metre used by him can be regarded as a direct descendant of that used in the folk songs. By the fifteenth century the Odia language had assumed almost its modern form and had become ripe for literary compositions.

The predominant sentiment in Sarala Dasa's poem is not love but war. He was also motivated by a strong religious zeal to compose religious books in a language intelligible to all and to make them available to the general public in Odisha. He tells in no uncertain words that he composed his poems for the benefit of "human beings". There are several indications in his Mahabharata that he served as a soldier in the army of the Gajapati King of Odisha and his association with the army brought to him a variety of experiences. The stories he heard the battle scenes which he witnessed, the places that he visited with the company of the army the historical incidents and names that he could know all remained stored up in his mind to be utilized in his writings.

== See also ==
- List of Indian poets
