= Amarendra Das =

Indian politician

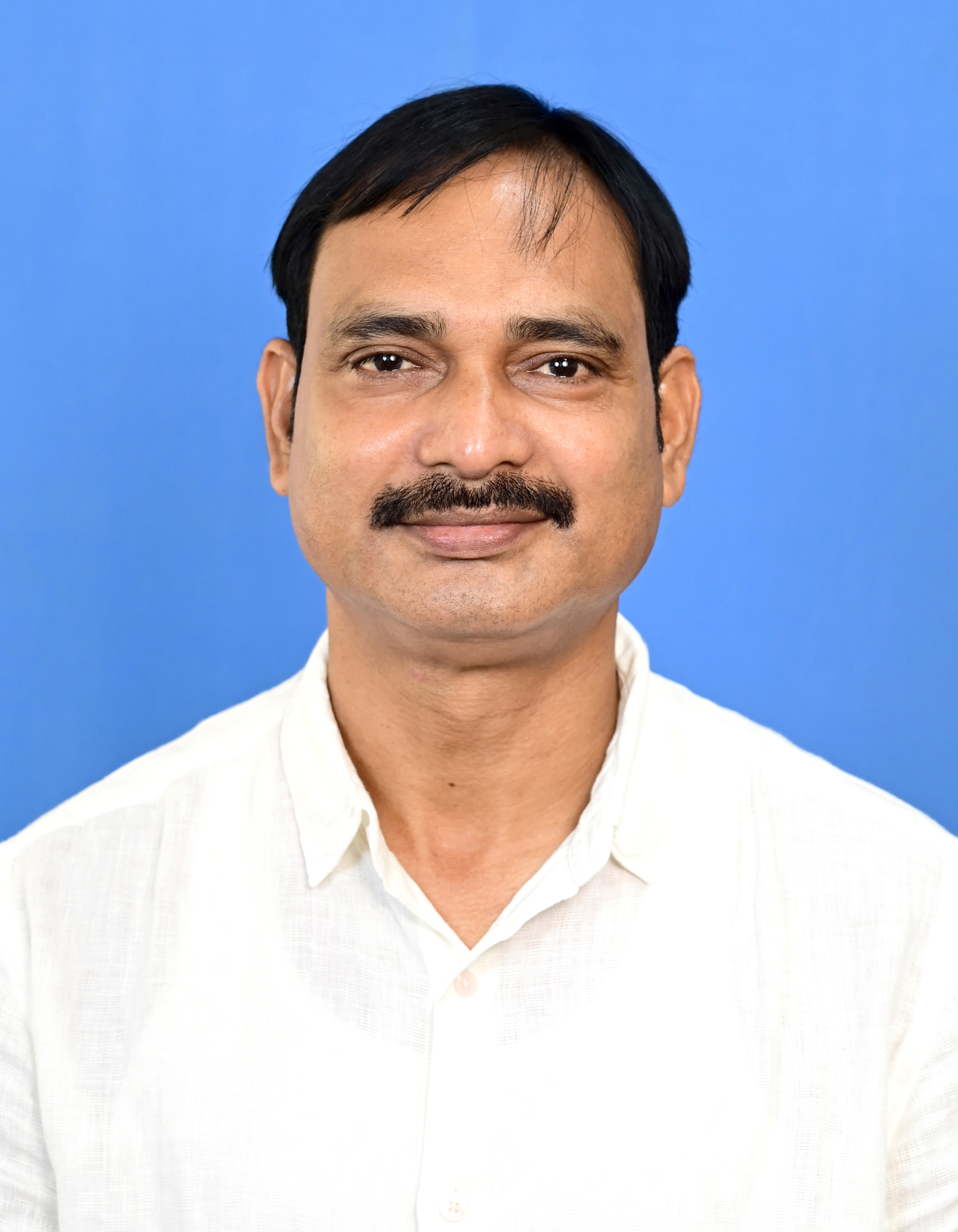
- Amarendra Das in 2024

Member of Odisha Legislative Assembly
- Incumbent
- Assumed office 4 June 2024
- Preceded by: Prasanta Kumar Muduli
- Constituency: Jagatsinghpur

Personal details
- Born: 14 June 1975 (age 50)
- Party: Bharatiya Janata Party
- Other political affiliations: Biju Janata Dal
- Profession: Politician

Amarendra Das is an Indian politician. He was elected to the Odisha Legislative Assembly from Jagatsinghpur Assembly constituency as a member of the Bharatiya Janata Party.

== Personal life ==
Das was born on 14 June 1975 in a Karan family. On April 4, 2024 Das left Biju Janata Dal and joined Bharatiya Janata Party on next day. In 2024 Odisha Assembly Election Das contested Jagatsinghpur Assembly constituency from Bharatiya Janata Party ticket and won in the margin of 22138 votes against Biju Janata Dal candidate Prasanta Kumar Muduli.
