= Prasanta Kumar Muduli =

Indian politician

Member of Odisha Legislative Assembly
- In office 2009–2019
- Preceded by: Umesh Chandra Swain
- Constituency: Balikuda-Erasama
- In office 2019–2024
- Constituency: Jagatsinghpur

Personal details
- Party: Biju Janata Dal
- Profession: Politician

Prasanta Kumar Muduli is an Indian politician from Odisha. He was a three time elected Member of the Odisha Legislative Assembly from 2009 and 2014, representing Balikuda-Erasama Assembly constituency and in 2019 representing Jagatsinghpur Assembly constituency as a Member of the Biju Janata Dal.

== See also ==
- 2009 Odisha Legislative Assembly election
- Odisha Legislative Assembly
