= Devdas Chhotray =

Devdas Chhotray First Vice-Chancellor of Ravenshaw University
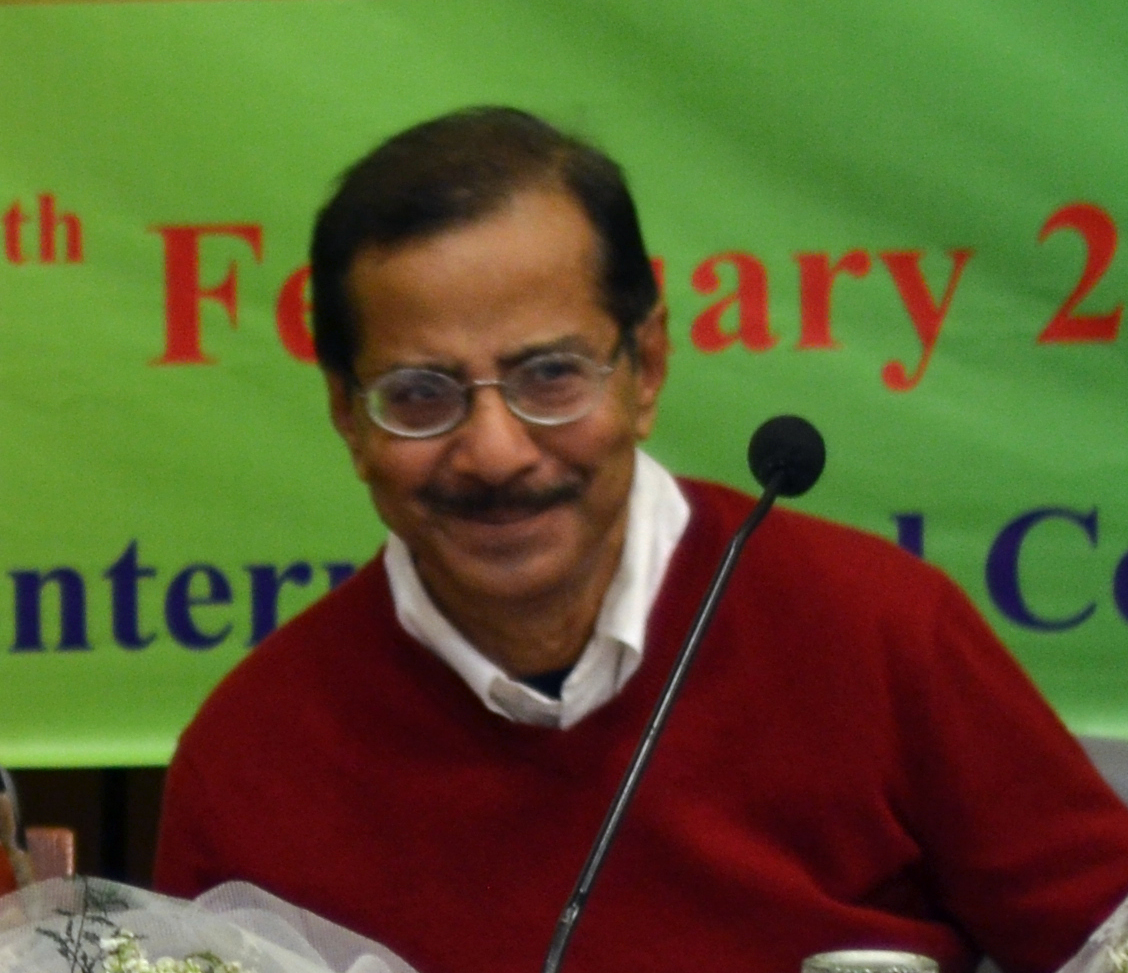

Chairman Biju Patnaik Film and Television Institute, Cuttack

Vice-Chancellor Ravenshaw University Cuttack
- Incumbent
- Assumed office 15 November 2006

Personal details
- Born: 25 November 1946 (age 79) Cuttack
- Education: Ravenshaw College, Utkal University; Cornell University,
- Profession: Indian Administrative Service officer, writer
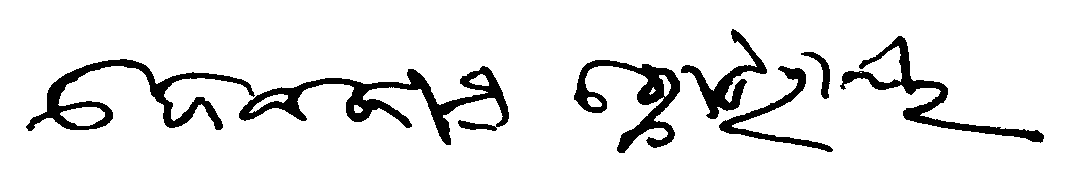
- Signature

Devdas Chhotray is an Indian Odia author, administrator and academic. He was the first vice-chancellor of Ravenshaw University, Cuttack, Odisha. His work consists of poetry, short stories, lyrics, musicals and screenplays. Chhotray's father Gopal Chhotray, a recipient of Padma, Central Sahitya Akademi and Sangeet Natak Akademi Award, was an architect of modern Odia theatre.

== Early life, education and career ==
Chhotray was educated at Ravenshaw College (now Ravenshaw University) and Cornell University. After joining the Indian Administrative Service in 1971, he worked in West Bengal, Bihar, Orissa and New Delhi. In 2006 Chhotray became the first vice-chancellor of Ravenshaw University, obtained UGC approval for the school in six months.

Chhotray was director of the Orissa Film Development Corporation from 1983 to 1989 and 1996–98, chairman of the publications committee for the fifth International Children's Film Festival in 1987 and was vice-president of the governing council of the Film and Television Institute of India in Pune from 1999 to 2001.

=== Lyrics credit ===
- Boura Hatabaksa
- Pahili Raja
- Nandini I Love U
- Laxmi Pratima
- Puja Pain Phulatie
- Tu Eka Aama Saha Bharasa
- To Akhi Mo Aina
- Paradesi Babu
- Kapala Likhana
- Suna Chadhei
- Chaka Aakhi Sabu Dekhuchi
- Chaka Bhaunri
- Sapana Banika
- Sahari Bagha
- Jaga Hatare Pagha
- Hira Nila

== Books and writings ==
He has written a collection of stories, Lal Machha (Red Fish), the lyrics for more than 75 films in Oriya and television musicals. Chhotray is known for his collaboration with Akshaya Mohanty, a pioneer in modern Oriya music from the 1960s until his death in 2002, as Mohanty's principal songwriter.

He has written screenplays for feature films in Oriya. One, Indradhanura Chhai (Shadows of the Rainbow) was screened at the Cannes Film Festival in 1995.

In addition to Chhotray's anthologies of poems and stories in Oriya, notably Nila Saraswati (Blue Muse) and Hati Saja Kara (Order the Elephants), English translations of his poems have appeared in Longing (published by Pimlico Books in London). An anthology of his poems in Hindi, Ret Ki Sidhi (A Staircase of Sand) has been published in Delhi.

== Awards ==
Chhotray's four decades of poetry and lyrics have been translated into Indian and foreign languages, and he has been published in Bengali (in the Sunil Gangopadhyaya-edited Krittibas. He has received the Prajatantra Bisuv Milan and Utkal Samaj Centenary (Gangadhar Meher Samman) Awards and the 2008 Rajdhani Book Fair Award 2008 for poetry.

- Odisha Excellence Award 2018
