= Jyotirmayee Dash =

Indian chemist and professor

Professor at Indian Association for the Cultivation of Science
- In office 2014–2035

Assistant professor at Indian Institute of Science Education and Research, Kolkata
- In office 2011–2014

Personal details
- Education: Ravenshaw University (MSc); IIT Kanpur (Ph.D. 2003)
- Profession: Professor; Researcher; Scientist
- Known for: Organic synthesis, Chemical biology & Nucleic acid chemistry
- Awards: Shanti Swarup Bhatnagar Prize
- Scientific career
- Fields: Organic Chemistry

Jyotirmayee Dash is a professor at the Indian Association for the Cultivation of Science, Kolkata, with research interests in topics related to organic chemistry and chemical biology in general.

Jyotirmayee Dash obtained her PhD in synthetic organic chemistry from IIT Kanpur in 2003 under the advisorship of Prof. F. A. Khan and her MSc degree from Ravenshaw University, Cuttack, India. She was an Alexander von Humboldt Fellow at the Freie Universität Berlin, Germany, during 2004–2006, a postdoctoral fellow at ESPCI Paris, France, during 2006–2007 and a Marie-Curie Fellow at University of Cambridge, UK, during 2007–2009. She spent three years as an assistant professor at the Indian Institute of Science Education and Research, Kolkata before joining the Indian Association for the Cultivation of Science in 2014.

== Honours and awards ==
The honours and awards conferred on Jyotirmayee Dash include:

- Asian Scientist 100, Asian Scientist, 2021
- Editorial Advisory Board Member, ACS Omega, 2021
- International Advisory Board, Asian Journal of Chemistry, 2021
- Shanti Swarup Bhatnagar Prize for Science and Technology for Chemical Sciences, 2020
- Fellow of the Royal Society of Chemistry, FRSC, 2020
- CRSI Bronze Medal, 2020
- DBT/Wellcome Trust Indian Alliance Senior Fellowship, 2020
- SwarnaJayanti Fellowship for the year 2015-2016
