= Devi River =

River in India

Coordinates: 19°59′N 86°24′E

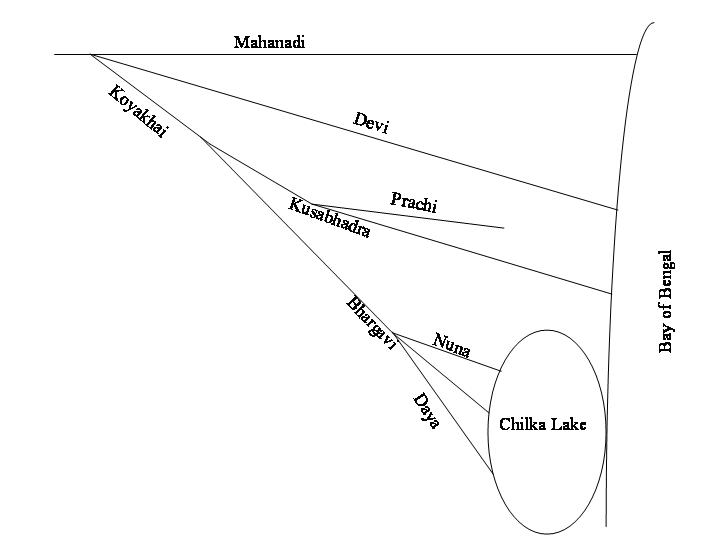
An illustration of Mahanadi Koyakhai distributary system in Odisha, India draining into Bay of Bengal and Chilka lake. Picture not drawn to scale.

The Devi River is one of the principal distributaries of the Mahanadi River in India. It flows through Jagatsinghpur district and Puri district across the Indian state of Odisha and joins the Bay of Bengal.

== Course ==
The river forms the final part of a great network of Mahanadi river. Kathajodi river is the main southern distributary of Mahanadi river branching off at Cuttack, Odisha. Kathajodi river later acquires the name Devi as it flows further east. The river flows through Alipingal, Macchagaon and Naugaon blocks in Jagatsinghpur district and Astaranga and Kakatpur blocks in Puri district. It reaches the Bay of Bengal 70 kilometres (43 mi) south of the mouth of Mahanadhi river, a short distance from the border of Cuttack and Puri districts. The mouth of the river is surrounded by dense forests with little human population.

== Navigation ==
The river is navigable till Machhagaon by small sloops. It is one of the best tidal channels in Orissa; however, vessels cannot enter the river upstream due to a large sediment of sand in the mouth of the river. Two fishermen were killed and two injured when a boat capsized near Astarang in the Devi River on 13 May 1988.

== Turtle rookery ==
The mouth of the Devi River serves as a nesting ground for olive ridley sea turtles during their breeding season. The first rookery in this area north of Puri was discovered in 1981. Nesting occurs on mainland India and dynamic sand bars which appear and change forms from year to year. About 800,000 turtles come to the region every winter for breeding. However, turtle nesting has declined in recent years due to mass death believed to be brought about by increased mechanised fishing. Over 6,000 olive ridleys were killed in 2003 alone. According to a 2007 estimate, over 130,000 turtles have been found dead on the beaches over the previous 13 years. The effort to set aside the mouth of Devi River and Rushikulya River as sanctuaries for olive ridley turtles was opposed by local fishing communities.

== Water pollution ==
Devi Kandal island people are affected by the pollution of the Devi and Kandal rivers due to the surge of huge amounts of untreated drain water from Cuttack municipality region. Both rivers are distributaries of Kathajodi River, getting significantly less water supply due to the obstruction of a concrete wall built on the mouth or initial points of both the rivers at Naraj. It was built to reserve more water for industrial buildings.

The lower amounts of water flow, largely polluted by drain water from Cuttack City, makes the water of both the rivers hazardous. As a result, there has been a drastic reduction in many species of fishes and other aquatic animals in the rivers. The fishing community has been the most affected: residents who use the water for bathing, washing clothes and agriculture purposes are impacted by various waterborne diseases and other health problems. The ground water level in the region drastically goes down in the summer as it depends upon the level and quantity of water in the rivers.

== See also ==
- Sailo Jharapada, nearby village
