= Balikuda-Erasama Assembly constituency =

Constituency of the Odisha legislative assembly in India

Coordinates: 20.18°N 86.34°E

Balikuda-Erasama
- Constituency No. 103 for the Odisha Legislative Assembly
- Balikuda-Erasama Assembly constituency in Jagatsinghpur district

Constituency details
- Country: India
- Region: East India
- State: Odisha
- Division: Central Division
- District: Jagatsinghpur
- Lok Sabha constituency: Jagatsinghpur
- Established: 1951
- Total electors: 2,70,641 (Note: as on 2024) (Note: as data published by election commission)
- Reservation: None

Member of Legislative Assembly
- 17th Odisha Legislative Assembly
- Incumbent Sarada Prasanna Jena
- Party: Biju Janata Dal
- Elected year: 2024

Balikuda-Erasama is a Vidhan Sabha constituency of Jagatsinghpur district, Odisha. Following 2008 delimitation, Ersama Assembly constituency was subsumed into this constituency.

This constituency includes Balikuda block and Erasama block.

== Elected members ==
Vote share of winning candidates
2024	46.04%
2019	53.83%
2014	38.12%
2009	57.73%
2004	42.76%
2000	47.16%
1995	49.13%
1990	62.90%
1985	51.86%
1980	57.64%
1977	56.43%

Since its formation in 1951, 17 elections were held till date.

List of members elected from Balikuda-Erasama constituency are:

Year	Member	Party
As Balikuda-Erasama Constituency
2024	Sarada Prasanna Jena	Biju Janata Dal
2019	Raghunandan Das	Biju Janata Dal
2014	Prasanta Kumar Muduli	Biju Janata Dal
2009	Prasanta Kumar Muduli	Biju Janata Dal
As Balikuda Constituency
2004	Umesh Chandra Swain	Indian National Congress
2000	Umesh Chandra Swain	Indian National Congress
1995	Lalatendu Mohapatra	Indian National Congress
1990	Umesh Chandra Swain	Janata Dal
1985	Jyotish Chandra Das	Indian National Congress
1980	Basudev Mahapatra	Indian National Congress (I)
1977	Umesh Chandra Swain	Janata Party
1974	Basudev Mahapatra	Indian National Congress
1971	Basudev Mahapatra	Indian National Congress (R)
1967	Baikunthanath Mohanty	Praja Socialist Party
1961	Bipin Bihari Das	Indian National Congress
1957	Baikunthanath Mohanty	Praja Socialist Party
1951	Prana Krushna Parija	Independent politician

== Election results ==
=== 2024 ===
Voting were held on 1 June 2024 in 4th phase of Odisha Assembly Election & 7th phase of Indian General Election. Counting of votes was on 4 June 2024. In 2024 election, Biju Janata Dal candidate Sarada Prasanna Jena defeated Bharatiya Janata Party candidate Satya Sarathi Mohanty by a margin of 25,959 votes.

2024 Odisha Vidhan Sabha Election, Balikuda-Erasama
Party	Candidate	Votes	%	±%
BJD	Sarada Prasanna Jena	93,517	46.04	▼7.78
BJP	Satya Sarathi Mohanty	67,558	33.26	▲13.76
INC	Nalini Swain	27,981	13.78	▼11.73
NOTA	None of the above	475	0.23	▼0.07
Majority		25,959	11.78	
Turnout		2,03,121	75.75	
BJD hold				

=== 2019 ===
In 2019 election, Biju Janata Dal candidate Raghunandan Das defeated Indian National Congress candidate Lalatendu Mohapatra by a margin of 54,583 votes.

2019 Odisha Vidhan Sabha Election, Balikuda-Erasama
Party	Candidate	Votes	%	±%
BJD	Raghunandan Das	1,03,814	53.83	
INC	Lalatendu Mohapatra	49,231	25.51	
BJP	Damodar Rout	37,611	19.5	
NOTA	None of the above	576	0.3	
Majority		54,583	28.32	
Turnout		1,92,854	75.64	
BJD hold				

=== 2014 ===
In 2014 election, Biju Janata Dal candidate Prasanta Kumar Muduli defeated Indian National Congress candidate Lalatendu Mohapatra by a margin of 29,354 votes.

2014 Vidhan Sabha Election, Balikuda-Erasama
Party	Candidate	Votes	%	±%
BJD	Prasanta Kumar Muduli	69,335	38.12	▼19.61
INC	Lalatendu Mohapatra	39,981	21.98	▼15.4
Independent	Raghunandan Das	32,135	17.67	−
Independent	Sarada Prasanna Jena	23,948	13.17	−
BJP	Chitta Ranjan Kansa	3,724	2.05	▼1.73
NOTA	None	654	0.36	−
Majority		29,354	13.13	▼7.22
Turnout		1,81,895	78.66	▲9.95
Registered electors		2,31,249		
BJD hold				

=== 2009 ===
In 2009 election, Biju Janata Dal candidate Prasanta Kumar Muduli defeated Indian National Congress candidate Umesh Chandra Swain by a margin of 31,385 votes.

2009 Vidhan Sabha Election, Balikuda-Erasama
Party	Candidate	Votes	%	±%
BJD	Prasanta Kumar Muduli	89,044	57.73	−
INC	Umesh Chandra Swain	57,659	37.38	−
BJP	Priya Ranjan Das	5,832	3.78	−
Majority		31,385	20.35 (Note: %of total valid votes)	−
Turnout		1,54,282	68.71	▲1.29
Registered electors		2,24,556		
BJD gain from INC				
