= Odia literature =

Odia literature is literature written in the Odia language, mostly from the Indian state of Odisha. The modern Odia language is mostly formed from Tadbhava words with significant Sanskrit (Tatsama) influences, along with loanwords from Desaja, English and Hindustani (Hindi/Urdu). Its earliest written texts date from around 1000 CE. The earliest Odia newspaper was Utkala Deepika, first published on August 4, 1866.

Historians have divided Odia literature into five main stages: Old Odia (800 AD to 1300 AD), Early Medieval Odia (1300 AD to 1500 AD), Medieval Odia (1500 AD to 1700 AD), Late Medieval Odia (1700 AD to 1850 AD) and Modern Odia (1870 AD to present). Further subdivisions, as seen below, more precisely chart the language's development.

== 4th century BC ==
The creativity and development of the Odia language and literature can be seen in its spoken forms, such as folk tales, and in written forms, such as rock edicts and manuscripts. Songs sung to memorialize birth, death, work, and festivals helped to preserve the language in its oral form, passing it through the generations. Stories depicted in cave paintings preserved the language in the written form.

Kharavela's Hatigumpha inscription serves as evidence of past Odia cultural, political, ritual, and social status, and is the first poetic stake inscription. Though Ashoka had created rock edicts and inscriptions before Kharavela, his instructions for administration were written in a rude and choked style. However, the Hatigumpha inscription shows the language's flexibility and flow.

The main feature of this inscription is based on principles of Sanskrit poetic structure, such as:

Sadvanshah kshyatriya bâ pi dhiirodâttah gunanwitâh I

Ekabanshodva bhupâhâ kulajâ bahabo pi Jâ II
Shrungarabirashantânâmekoangirasa ishyate I
Angâni sarbe<pi rasâha sarbe nâtakasandhyâhâ II
Itihâsodvabam bruttamânânyad bâ sajjanâshrayam I
Chatwarastasya bargahâ syusteshwekam cha phalam bhavet II
Aâdyu namaskriyashribâ bastunirddesha eba bâ I
Kwacinnindâ khalâdinâm satâm cha gunakirttinam II

(Sâhitya darpan- Biswanâth kabirâj)

When the Hatigumpha Inscription was created, its principles had been traced before. They were followed by Rudradaman (Girinar inscription 150 AD), Samudragupta (Prayaga inscription 365 AD), Kumargupta (Mandasore inscription 473 AD), who created their own works in a poetic style on many rocks, in Sanskrit. The writing trend was not obstructed after Kharavela. The Asanapata inscription in Keonjhar created by Satru Bhanja, (a warrior of Odisha) was engraved in the temple, Laxminarayana of Simhanchalam by Mukunda Deva. In the beginning, these inscriptions had a dynamic journey from Pali to Sanskrit. Odia language, literature, script and culture are based on the discussions of these inscriptions. The words written in the Hatigumpha Inscription are still used.

== Age of Charya literature (7th to 8th centuries CE) ==
The beginnings of Odia poetry coincide with the development of Charyapada or Caryagiti, literature started by Vajrayana Buddhist poets. This literature was written from the "Sandhya Bhasha" metaphor. Some of its poets such as Luipa and Kanhupa came from present-day Odisha. The language of Charya was considered to be Prakrit. In one of his poems, Kanhupa wrote:

Your hut stands outside the city
Oh, untouchable maid
The bald Brahmin passes sneaking close by
Oh, my maid, I would make you my companion
Kanha is a kapali, a yogi
He is naked and has no disgust
There is a lotus with sixty-four petals
Upon that the maid will climb with this poor self and dance.

This poet used images and symbols from the social milieu/collective psychology so that deep realization could be grasped by readers. This kind of poetry, full of the mystery of tantra, spread throughout northeastern India from the 10th to the 14th centuries, and its style of expression was revived by the Odia poets of the 16th to the 19th centuries.

== Pre-Sarala Age (12th to 14th centuries) ==
In the pre-Sarala period, Natha and Siddha literature flourished. The main works of this period are Shishu veda (an anthology of 24 dohas), Amara Kosha and Gorakha Samhita. Shishu veda is mentioned in the works of Sarala Das and the later 16th century poets. It is written in Dandi brutta. Raja Balabhadra Bhanja wrote the love story, Bhababati (ଭାବବତୀ). Other important works of this period include Kalasha Chautisha(କଳସା ଚଉତିଶା), by Baccha Das; Somanatha bratakatha (ସୋମନାଥ ବ୍ରତକଥା), Nagala chauthi (ନାଗଲ ଚଉଠି), Ta'poi (ତ'ପୋଇ), and Saptanga (ସପ୍ତଙ୍ଗ).

Rudrasudhanidhi is considered the first work of Odia prose, written by Abhadutta Narayan Swami.

Markanda Das composed the first Koili (an ode to a cuckoo) in Odia just before Sarala Das. His composition Kesava Koili describes the pain of separation of Yasoda from her son Krishna. He is known to have composed the epic Daasagriba badha, Jnaanodaya koili.

== Sarala Dasa ==
In the 15th century, Sanskrit was the language of literature while Odia was often considered the language of the peasants and outcastes, who had no access to education.Sarala dasa is also known as ଆଦି କବି. The first great poet of Odisha with widespread readership was Sarala Das, who translated the Mahabharata into Odia. He also written chandi purana .This was not an exact translation from the Sanskrit original, but rather an imitation. It can be seen as an original work. Sarala Das was given the title Shudramuni(Peasant-sage). He had no formal education and did not know Sanskrit.

This translation provided subsequent poets with the necessary foundation for a national literature, providing a fairly accurate idea of the Odia culture at the time. Dasa, born in 15th century Odisha under Gajapati emperor Kapilendra Deva, was acclaimed as the "Adikabi" or first poet. The reign of the Gajapatis is considered to be the golden period for Odisha art and literature. Kapilendra Deva patronized Odia language and literature along with Sanskrit, unlike his predecessors who used only Sanskrit. A short Odia poem Kebana Munikumara was found in the Sanskrit Drama Parashurama Vijaya, ascribed emperor Kapilendra Deva. Sarala Dasa's poetic gift was believed to come from Sarala (Saraswati), and that Sarala Das wrote the Mahabharata while she dictated it. Though he wrote many poems and epics, he is best remembered for Mahabharata. His other notable works are Chandi Purana and Vilanka Ramayana. He composed Lakshmi-Narayana Bachanika.

Arjuna Dasa, a contemporary of Sarala-Das, wrote Rama-Bibaha(ରାମ ବିବାହ), which is a significant long poem in Odia. He is the author of Kalpalata (କଳ୍ପଲତା).

== Panchasakhas ==
Five notable Odia poets emerged during the late 15th and early 16th centuries: Balarama Dasa, Atibadi Jagannath Das, Achyutananda Das, Ananta Dasa, and Jasobanta Dasa. Although their works spanned over one hundred years, they are collectively known as the "Panchasakhas", since they adhered to the Utkaliya Vaishnavism school of thought. The word pancha means five, while the word sakha means friend.

The Panchasakhas were Vaishnavas by faith. In 1509, Shri Chaitanya came to Odisha carrying his Vaishnava message of love. Before him, Jaydev had prepared the ground for Vaishnavism through his Gita Govinda. Chaitanya's path of devotion was known as Raganuga Bhakti Marga. He introduced chanting as a way to form a spiritual connection and taught the importance of Hare Krishna mantras. Unlike Chaitanya, the Panchasakhas believed in Gyana Mishra Bhakti Marga, similar to the Buddhist philosophy of Charya literature.

The Panchasakhas were significant because of their poetry and their spiritual legacy. In the holy land of Kalinga (Odisha) saints, mystics, and devotional souls were born, fortifying its culture and spiritualism. The area uniquely includes temples of Shakti, Shiva and Jagannatha Vishnu. Rituals and traditions were sustained by various seers – including Buddhist ceremonies, Devi "Tantra" (tantric rituals for Shakti), Shaiva Marg and Vaishnava Marg.

The origin of the Panchasakhas were described in Achyutananda's Shunya Samhita. As per his narration, towards the end of Mahabharat when Lord Krishna was leaving his mortal body, Nilakantheswara Mahadeva appeared and revealed to him that the Lord's companions Dama, Sudama, Srivatsa, Subala, and Subahu would reincarnate in the Kali Yuga and be known as Ananta, Acyutananda, Jagannatha, Balarama and Yasovanta, respectively. Thus, believers in the Panchasakha consider them to be the most intimate friends of Lord Krishna in Dvapara Yuga, who came again in Kali Yuga to serve him. They are instrumental in performing the crucial and much-awaited Yuga-Karma, where they destroy the sinners and save the saints, according to Sanatana-Hindu beliefs.

Balaram Das's Jagamohana Ramayana provided one pillar, along with Sarala-Das's Mahabharata, upon which subsequent Odia literature was built. His Lakshmi Purana is considered the first manifesto of women's liberation or feminism in Indian literature. His other major works are Gita Abakasa, Bhava samudra, Gupta Gita, Vedanta Sara, Mriguni Stuti, Saptanga Yogasara Tika, Vedanta Sara or Brahma Tika, Baula Gai gita, Kamala Lochana Chotisa, Kanta Koili, Bedha Parikrama, Brahma Gita, Brahmanda Bhugola, Vajra Kavacha, Jnana Chudamani, Virata Gita, Ganesha Vibhuti, and Amarakosha Gita.

The most influential work of this period was Atibadi Jagannath Das's Bhagabata, which had a great influence on the Odia people as a day-to-day philosophical guide, as well as a lasting one in Odia culture. His other works include Gupta Bhagavat, Tula vina, Sola Chapadi, Chari Chapadi, Tola Bena, Daru Brahma Gita, Diksa Samyad, Artha Koili, Muguni Stuti, Annamaya Kundali, Goloka Sarodhara, Bhakti Chandrika, Kali Malika, Indra Malika, Niladri Vilasa, Nitya Gupta Chintamani, Sri Krishna Bhakti Kalpa Lata.

Shishu Ananta Das was born in Balipatana near Bhubaneswar in the late 15th century. He wrote Bhakti mukti daya gita, Sisu Deva gita, Artha tarani, Udebhakara, Tirabhakana, a Malika and several bhajan poetries.

Yashobanta Das was the composer of Govinda Chandra (a ballad or Gatha- Sangeeta), Premabhakti, Brahma Gita, Shiva Swarodaya, Sasti mala, Brahma gita, Atma pariche gita, a Malika and several bhajans.

Mahapurusha Achyutananda is the most prolific writer of the Panchasakhas. He is believed to have been born through special divine intervention from Lord Jagannath. The name Achyuta literally means "created from Lord Vishnu". He is also referred to as "Achyuti", i.e. "He who has no fall" in Odia. He was born to Dinabandhu Khuntia & Padma Devi in Tilakona, Nemal around 1485 AD. He established spiritual energetic centers called "gadis" across east India (in the former states of Anga, Banga, Kalinga, Magadha) and Nepal. Gadis such as Nemal, Kakatpur, Garoi, and Jobra Ghat were places for spiritual action, discourse and penance. He was learned in Ayurveda, sciences and social regulations. His works are Harivamsa, Tattva bodhini, Sunya samhita, Jyoti samhita, Gopala Ujjvala, Baranasi Gita, Anakara Brahma Samhita, Abhayada Kavacha, Astagujari, Sarana panjara stotra, Vipra chalaka, Manamahima, Maalika.

The Panchasakha's individual characteristics are described as follows (in Odia and English):

Agamya bhâba jânee Yasovanta
Gâra katâ Yantra jânee Ananta
Âgata Nâgata Achyuta bhane
Balarâma Dâsa tatwa bakhâne
Bhaktira bhâba jâne Jagannâtha
Panchasakhaa e
mora pancha mahanta.

Yasovanta knows the things beyond reach
Yantras uses lines and figures known to Ananta
Achyuta speaks the past, present and future

Balarama Dasa is fluent in tatwa (the ultimate meaning of anything)

Ultimate feelings of devotion are known to Jagannatha
These five friends are my five mahantas.

During the Panchasakha era another seer, Raghu Arakhsita, who was not part of the Panchasakhas but was a revered saint, composed several padabalis in Odia. The Panchasakha and Arakhshita together are known as the Sada-Goswami (six Lords).

Madhavi Pattanayak or Madhavi Dasi is considered as the first Odia woman poet who was a contemporary of Prataprudra Deva and wrote several devotional poems for Lord Jagannatha.

== Riti Juga (16th to mid 17th centuries) ==
Several kaalpanika (imaginative) and pauraanika (Puranic) kavyas were composed during this period that formed the foundation for Riti Juga. The major works of this era (other than those by the Panchasakhas) are Gopakeli and Parimalaa authored by Narasingha Sena, contemporary of Gajapati emperor Prataprudra Deva, Chataa Ichaamati and Rasa by Banamali Das, Premalochana, Bada Shakuntala & Kalaabati by Vishnu Das, Nrushingha purana and Nirguna Mahatmya by Chaitanya Dash (born in Kalahandi), Lilaabati by Raghunatha Harichandan, Usha Bilasa by Shishu Shankar Das, Sasisena by Pratap Rai, Rahashya Manjari by Devadurlava Das, Hiraabati by Ramachandra Chottaray, Deulatola by Nilambara Das, Prema Panchamruta by Bhupati Pandit, Rukmini Vivaha by Kartik Das, Goparasa by Danai Das and Kanchi Kaveri by Purushotama Das. In the 16th century three poets translated Jayadeva's Gita Govinda into Odia. They were Dharanidhara Mishra, Brindavan Das (Rasabaridhi) and Trilochan Das (GovindaGita). Brundabati Dasi, a woman poet wrote Purnatama Chandrodaya Kavya towards the end of the 17th century.

Several Chautishas (a form of Odia poetry where 34 stanzas from "ka" to "Khsya" are placed at the start of each composition) were composed during this time. The best known are Milana Chautisha, Mandakini Chautisha, Barshabharana Chautisha, Rasakulya Chautisha, and Manobodha Chautisha.

Muslim poet Salabega was a devotional poet who composed several poems dedicated to Lord Jagannath during Jahangir's reign in the 17th century.

=== Age of Upendra Bhanja ===
After the Panchasakhas, prominent works included the Usabhilasa of Sisu Sankara Das, the Rahasya-manjari of Deva-durlabha Dasa and the Rukmini-bibha of Karttika Das. A new form of novels in verse evolved at the beginning of the 17th century when Ramachandra Pattanayaka wrote Haravali. The prominent poets, however, are Dhananjaya Bhanja (born 1611. AD), Dinakrushna Das (born 1650. AD), Kabi Samrat Upendra Bhanja (born 1670. AD) and Abhimanyu Samantasinhara. Their poetry, especially that of Upendra Bhanja, is characterised by verbal tricks, obscenity and eroticism.

Upendra Bhanja's works such as Baidehisha Bilasa, Koti Brahmanda Sundari and Labanyabati are landmarks. He was conferred the title "Kabi Samrat" of Odia literature for his poetic sense and skill with words. He wrote 52 books, of which only 25–26 survive. He contributed more than 35,000 words to Odia literature and is considered the greatest poet of Riti Juga.

Poet Dhananjaya Bhanja (1611–1701), was also king of Ghumusar and grandfather of Upendra Bhanja, wrote several kavyas including Anangarekha, Ichaavati, Raghunatha Bilasa, and Madana Manjari. Besides Tribikrama Bhanja (author of Kanakalata) and Ghana Bhanja (author of Trailokyamohini, Rasanidhi, and Govinda Bilasha) of the Bhanja royal family also enriched Odia Literature. Lokanatha Vidyadhara, a contemporary of Upendra Bhanja, wrote Sarbanga Sundari.

Dinakrushna Das's Rasokallola and Abhimanyu Samanta Simhara's Bidagdha Chintamani are prominent kavyas of this time. Bidagdha Chintamani is considered the longest kavya in Odia literature with 96 cantos exceeding Upendra's longest kavya of 52 cantos. Other prominent works of Abhimanyu Samanta Simhara are Sulakhshyana, Prema Chintaamani, Prema Kala, Rasaabati, Prematarangini.

A new form of poetry called Bandha kabita started, where the poem was written within the bandha or frame of a picture. Upendra Bhanja pioneered this pictorial poetry. His Chitrakavya Bandhodaya is the first such creation, containing 84 pictorial poems. Poets in this tradition include Sadananda Kabisurya Bramha (Lalita Lochana and Prema Kalpalata), Tribikrama Bhanja (Kanakalata), Kesabaraja Harichandana (Rasa Sindhu Sulakhshyana).

=== Late Riti Juga ===
Towards the end of Riti Yuga, four major poets emerged. These were Kabi Surya Baladeb Rath, Brajanath Badajena, Gopalakrushna Pattanayaka and Bhima Bhoi. Kabisurya Baladev Rath wrote his poems in champu (mixture of prose and poetry) and chautisha styles. His greatest work is Kishore Chandranana Champu which is extensively used in Odissi Music. Brajanath Badjena started a tradition of prose fiction, though he was not a great talent. His Chatur Binoda (Amusement of Intelligent) seems to be the first work that deals with different kinds of rasas, predominantly the bibhatsa rasa, but often verges on nonsense. The style of Chitra Kavya (mixture of poetry and paintings) was at its best in the 18th century. Several chitra pothis can be traced to this time.

Bichitra Ramayana of Biswanaath Khuntia was composed in the early 18th century. Pitambar Das wrote the epic Narasingha Purana in seven parts called Ratnakaras then. Maguni Pattanaik composed Rama Chandra Vihara. Rama Lila was composed by Vaishya Sadashiva and Ananga Narendra. Bhima Bhoi, the blind poet born in a tribal Khondh family is known for his compositions Stuticintamani, Bramha Nirupana Gita, Shrutinishedha Gita. The other major poets at this time were Banamali Dasa, Jadumani Mahapatra, Bhaktacharan Das (author of Manabodha Chautisha and Mathura Mangala), Haribandhu, Gaurahari, Gauracharana, and Krishna Simha.

== Age of Radhanath ==
The first Odia magazine, Bodha Dayini was published in Balasore in 1861. Its goal was to promote Odia literature and critique government policy. The first Odia newspaper The Utkala Deepika, launched in 1866 under editors Gourishankar Ray and Bichitrananda. Utkal Deepika campaigned to bring all Odia-speaking areas under one administration, to develop Odia language and literature and to protect Odia interests.

In 1869 Bhagavati Charan Das started another newspaper, Utkal Subhakari, to propagate the Brahmo faith. In the last three and a half decades of the 19th century, more Odia newspapers launched. Prominent examples included Utkal Deepika, Utkal Patra, Utkal Hiteisini from Cuttack, Utkal Darpan and Sambada Vahika from Balasore and Sambalpur Hiteisini from Deogarh. These periodicals encouraged modern literature and offered a broad audience for Odia writers.

Radhanath Ray (1849–1908) is the most well-known poet of this period. He wrote with a Western influence, and his kavyas included Chandrabhaga, Nandikeshwari, Usha, Mahajatra, Darbar, and Chilika.

Fakir Mohan Senapati (1843–1918) became the best known Odia fiction writer. He was called the Vyasakabi or founding poet of the Odia language. Senapati was born in the coastal town of Balasore, and worked as a government administrator. Enraged by the attempts of the Bengalis to marginalize or replace the Odia language, he took to creative writing late in life. He did translations from Sanskrit, wrote poetry and attempted many forms of literature, but is now known as the father of modern Odia prose fiction. His Rebati (1898) is widely recognized as the first Odia short story. Rebati is the story of a young girl whose desire for education is placed in the context of a conservative society in a backward Odisha village, which is hit by a cholera epidemic. His other stories are "Patent Medicine", "Dak Munshi", and "Adharma Bitta". Senapati is known for his novel Chha Maana Atha Guntha. This was the first Indian novel to deal with the exploitation of landless peasants by a feudal lord. It was written well before the October Revolution in Russia.

Other eminent Odia writers and poets of the time include Gangadhar Meher (1862–1924), Madhusudan Rao, Chintamani Mohanty, Nanda Kishore Bal (1875-1928) Gourishankar Ray (1838-1917) and Reba Ray (1876-1957).

== Age of Satyabadi ==
During the age of Radhanath the literary world was divided between the classicists, led by the magazine The Indradhanu, and the modernists, led by the magazine Bijuli. Gopabandhu Das (1877–1928) was a great balancer and realized that a nation, as well as its literature, lives by its traditions. He believed that a modern national superstructure could only endure if based on solid historical foundations. He wrote a satirical poem in The Indradhanu, which led to punishment by the Inspector of Schools, but he refused to apologise.

Gopabandhu joined Ravenshaw College in Cuttack to pursue graduation after this incident. Gopabandhu, along with his friends, Brajasundar Das and Lokanath Patnaik, started the Kartavya Bodhini Samiti (Duty Awakening Society) in Ravenshaw College to take on social, economic and political problems and become responsible citizens. While leading a team to serve flood victims, Gopabandhu heard that his son was seriously ill. He preferred, however, to save the "sons of the soil" rather than his own son. His mission was to reform society and develop education in the name of a social service vision. He lost his wife at age twenty-eight, after losing all three of his sons. He left his two daughters and his property in the village with his elder brother, rejecting worldly life. For this social service mission he is regarded by Odias as the Utkalmani.

As freedom movements began, a new era in literary thought emerged influenced by Mahatma Gandhi and nationalism. Gopabandhu was a large part of this idealistic movement, founding a school in Satyabadi and influencing many writers. Other famous writers included Godabarisha Mishra, Nilakantha Dash, Harihara Acharya, and Krupasinshu. They are known as 'Panchasakhas' for their similarities with the historical Age of Panchasakhas. Their principle genres were criticism, essays and poetry.

Chintamani Das is particularly renowned. He was born in 1903 in Sriramachandrapur village near Sakhigopal. He was bestowed with the Sahitya Akademi Samman in 1970 for his contributions. Some of his well-known literary works are Manishi Nilakantha, Bhala Manisa Hua, Usha, Barabati, Byasakabi Fakiramohan and Kabi Godabarisha.

== Age of Romanticism or Sabuja Yuga ==
During the 1930s Odia literature was Influenced by the romantic thoughts of Rabindranath Tagore and progressive Marxist movements. Kalindi Charan Panigrahi (the brother of Bhagabati Charan Panigrahi who founded Marxism in Odisha) formed a group called "Sabuja Samiti" with two of his writer friends Annada Shankar Ray and Baikuntha Patnaik. This was a short period in Odia literature, later folded into Gandhian and Marxist work. Kalindi Charan Panigrahi later wrote his famous novel Matira Manisha, which was influenced by Gandhism, and Annada Shankar Ray left for Bengali literature. Mayadhar Mansingh was a renowned poet of that time, but though he was considered a Romantic poet he kept his distance from the influence of Rabindranath.

== Pragati Yuga ==
Nabajuga Sahitya Sansad, formed in 1935, was one of India's first progressive literary organizations, contemporaneous to other progressive writers' movements. The founders of the Progressive Movement in Odisha were Nabakrushna Choudhury, Bhagabati Panigrahi and Ananta Patnaik. At the inaugural session of Nabajuga Sahitya Sansad, freedom fighter Malati Choudhury sang "Nabeena Jugara Taruna Jagare" written by Ananta Patnaik. Nabajuga Sahity Sansad published Adhunika, the first progressive literary magazine in Odia. Adhuinka was conceived, initiated, edited, published and nurtured by Bhagabati Charan Panigrahi and Ananta Patnaik. Many writers of that time wrote in Adhunika.

== Modern age ==
=== Purnachandra Odia Bhashakosha ===
The Purnachandra Odia Bhashakosha is a 7-volume Odia dictionary/encyclopedia of about 9,500 pages published between 1930 and 1940. It was compiled by Gopal Chandra Praharaj (1874–1945) over nearly three decades. Praharaj conceived of and compiled the work and also raised the money to print it through public donations, grants and subscriptions and supervised the printing and the sales of the published work.

It lists some 185,000 words and their meanings in four languages – Odia, English, Hindi and Bengali. It includes quotations from classical works illustrating the usage of various words. It includes information such as botanical names of local plants, information on astronomy and long articles on various topics of local interest. It also includes biographies of personalities connected with Odisha's history and culture.

Purnachandra Odia Bhashakosha touches on many aspects of Odia and Odisha, as well as many topics of general interest. Its author was a lawyer by profession and was ridiculed and reviled during production. Many printed copies were destroyed unbound and unsold. Many copies sat in libraries of princes who had patronised the work. Most of these copies were sold cheaply when the princes met financial straits. Few copies survive, and those that exist are fragile and worm-damaged.

=== Poetry ===
As the successors of Sachi Routray, the father of modern Odia poetry, Guruprasad Mohanty and Bhanuji Rao were influenced by T.S. Eliot and published a co-authored poetry book Nutan Kabita. Ramakanta Rath later modified Eliot's ideas in his own work. According to Rath: "After the publication of Kalapurusha Guru Prasad's poetry collection influenced by T.S. Eliot's The Waste Land we realized that a sense of alienation is the main ingredient of modern poetry." Before independence Odia poetry was mostly written with Sanskritic or "literary" idiom, but after independence poets freely used of Western concepts, idioms, images and adaptation of Western myths. Ramakanta Rath, Hussain Rabi Gandhi, Sitakant Mahapatra, Soubhagya Kumar Mishra, Rajendra Kishore Panda, Pratibha Satpathy, Mamata Dash, Haraprasad Das and Goutam Jena are the best known.

There is a sect known as Chakulia panda that walk Odisha streets reciting ancient verse.

The early 1980s introduced poets with new thoughts and styles. They mixed Odia heritage and culture with the feelings of common people. They were somehow nearer to the readers as they avoided ambiguity in their expression.

The Odia poem "Nadi," recited by Ratnakar Sutar

=== Fiction ===
==== Before the 1970s ====
In the post-independence era Odia fiction took a new direction. The trend that Fakir Mohan started grew after independence, led by Gopinath Mohanty (1914–1991), Surendra Mohanty and Manoj Das (1934–2021). These authors pioneered the trend of developing or projecting the "individual as protagonist" in Odia fiction. Eminent feminist writer and critic Sarojini Sahoo believes that Surendra Mohanty's "Ruti O Chandra" should be considered the first story of the individualistic approach, rather than Gopinath's story "Dan". The major difference between the two is that Gopinath is more optimistic while Surendra is nihilistic. This nihilism prepared the ground for an existentialist movement in Odia literature.

Surendra Mohanty's short story collections and novels include Krushna Chuda, Mahanagarira Rati, Ruti O Chandra, Maralara Mrutyu, Shesha Kabita, Dura Simanta, Oh Calcutta, Kabi-O- Nartaki, Sabuja Patra-O-Dhusara Golap, Nila Shaila and Andha Diganta.

In his fiction Gopinath Mohanty explores all aspects of Odishan life, including the plains and the hills. He uses a lyrical prose style, adopting the day-to-day speech of ordinary men and women. Gopinath's first novel, Mana Gahtra Chasa, was published in 1940, followed by Dadi Budha (1944), Paraja (1945) and Amrutara Santan (1947). He published 24 novels, 10 collections of short stories, three plays, two biographies, two volumes of critical essays and five books on the languages of Kandh, Gadaba and Saora tribes. He translated Tolstoy's War and Peace (Yuddh O Shanti) in three volumes (tr. 1985–86) and Tagore's Jogajog (tr. 1965) into Odia.

Kalpanakumari Devi's sequence of novels, in particular, her Srushti o pralaya (1959), documented social change in the country.

Starting his literary career as a communist and later becoming an Aurobindian philosopher, Manoj Das wrote in Odia and English. His major Odia works are: Shesha Basantara Chithi (1966), Manoj Dasanka Katha O Kahani (1971), Dhumabha Diganta (1971), Manojpancabimsati (1977) and Tuma Gam O Anyanya Kabita (1992). Notable English works include The crocodile's lady : a collection of stories (1975), The submerged valley and other stories, Farewell to a ghost : short stories and a novelette (1994), Cyclones (1987) and A tiger at twilight (1991).

Ananta Charan Sukla's short story collection, Sulataku Sesa Chitthi (Last Letter to Sulata) was published in 1965. The ten stories included in this book are "Sulataku Sesa Chitthi", "Kapilas", "Janeika Kulapati-nka Mrutyu", "Tandril Ru Tornoto", "Mystic Realistic", "Prasanta Samudra: Asanta Lahari", "Nalakula Matha, Nepala Babu O Narana", "Daudana Bada Khara", "Duragata" and "Sandipani-ra Symphony".

Other significant pre-1970s fiction writers are Bama Charan Mitra, Chandrasekhar Rath, Shantanu Kumar Acharya, Mohapatra Nilamani Sahoo, Akhil Mohan Patnaik, Gobind Das, Rabi Patnaik and Jagannath Prasad Das. Chandra Sekhar Rath's novel Jantrarudha is a classic of this period. Shantanu Acharya's novel Nara-Kinnara was also influential.

==== After the 1970s ====
In the 1960s a small magazine Uan Neo Lu in Cuttack, challenged these authors' approaches. The title of the magazine was made up of three unused Odia alphabets. Writers associated with the magazine included Annada Prasad Ray, Guru Mohanty, Kailash Lenka, and Akshyay Mohanty. These writers began a revolution in Odia fiction. They introduced sexuality in their work and created a new prose style. In the late 1960s many "groups" of writers emerged from different parts of Odisha. Anamas from Puri, Abadhutas from Balugaon, Panchamukhi from Balangir, Abujha from Berhampur and Akshara group from Sambalpur created a sensation.

Changes that started in the 1960s were confirmed in the next decade by authors such as Jagadish Mohanty, Kanheilal Das, Satya Mishra, Ramchandra Behera, Tarun Kanti Mishra, Padmaja Pal, Yashodhara Mishra and Sarojini Sahoo. Kanheilal Das and Jagadish Mohanty began creating a style popular among a general audience as well as intellectuals. Jagadish Mohanty introduced existentialism to Odia literature. His works include Ekaki Ashwarohi, Dakshina Duari Ghara, Album, Dipahara Dekhinathiba Lokotie, Nian O Anyanya Galpo, Mephestophelesera Pruthibi, Nija Nija Panipatha, Kanishka Kanishka, Uttaradhikar, and Adrushya Sakal.

Ramchandra Behera is known for short story collections Dwitiya Shmashana, Abashishta Ayusha, Omkara Dhwani, Bhagnangshara Swapna and Achinha Pruthibi. Padmaj Pal is known for short story collections, including Eaglera Nakha Danta, Sabuthu Sundar Pakshi, Jibanamaya and Uttara Purusha. Tarun Kanti Mishra emerged during the 1970s as a powerful storyteller with an elegant style, full of poise and vigor. His outstanding works include Sharadah Shatam ( A Thousand Autumns), – a novel dealing with resettlement and rehabilitation of displaced persons from East Pakistan, now Bangladesh—and anthologies of short stories such as Komal Gandhar, Bitansa, Bhaswati and Akash Setu.

Sarojini Sahoo, who became known as a feminist writer, contributed to Odia fiction. Her novel Gambhiri Ghara is a landmark, that gained international recognition for its feminist and liberal ideas. Her other works include Amrutara Pratikshare, Chowkatha, Upanibesh, Pratibandi, Paksibasa, Tarlijauthiba Durga, Dukha Apramita, Gambhiri Ghara and Mahajatra. Kanaklata Hati, another women fiction writer whose writing featured psychoanalysis of the female mind. To date she published two story collections, Nirbak Pahada and Kuhudi Ghara. Her story collections Galpa Galpantara and Praibeshi Galpa were translated.

==== Popular fiction ====
A popular Odia literature emerged in the 1970s, particularly read by rural women. The best selling writers are Bhagirathi Das, Kanduri Das, Bhagwana Das, Bibhuti Patnaik and Pratibha Ray. Some of their works were made into Odia films. In recent times Rabi Kaunungo, Tarun Kanti Mishra, Ajay Swain, Mrinal Chatterjee, Radhu Mishra, Dr Laxmikant Tripathy, Nisith Bose, Suniti Mund, Anjan Chand and Dr. Kulangara contributed to popular writing.

==== Women writers ====
Women's magazine Sucharita was founded in 1975 by Sakuntala Panda. It had a significant impact in helping female writers find an audience. Its writers include Giribala Mohanty, Jayanti Rath, Susmita Bagchi. Paramita Satpathy, Hiranmayee Mishra, Chirashree Indra Singh, Sairindhree Sahoo, Supriya Panda, Gayatri Saraf, Suniti Mund and Mamatamay. Chowdhry. Giribala Mohanty (1947–) is noted for her deep sensitiveness for women's issues. Her poems depict the binary of women's social apathy and self-confidence. Her collections of poems include Streeloka (Women), Kalijhia (The Dark complexion Girl), Ma Habara Dukha (The sorrow of being a mother) and Kati Katia Katyayani. Sahoo had a significant influence on these women. Sahoo claims that women are an "Other" from the masculine perspective, but that they are entitled to equal human rights according to Plato. Suniti Mund's story book Anustupa, poetry book Jhia and novels Abhisapta, Agarbatira Ghara, Matrimony dot com and Gigolo also present a feminist voice.

=== Drama ===
The traditional Odia theater is the folk opera, or jatra, which flourishes in rural Odisha. Modern theater is not commercially viable, although in the 1960s experimental theatre made a mark through the works of Manoranjan Das, who pioneered an experimental theater movement. Bijay Mishra, Biswajit Das, Kartik Rath, Ramesh Prasad Panigrahi, Ratnakar Chaini, Prasanna Das, Pramod Kumar Tripathy, Sankar Tripathy, Ranjit Patnaik, Dr. Pradip Bhowmic, Hemendra Mahapatra, Dr. Panchanana Patra and Purna Chandra Mallick continued the tradition. Tripathy's contribution to the growth and development of lok natakas is recognised. Ananta Charan Sukla translated four classic Greek dramas. His 1974 book, Greek Drama has translations (with commentary) of Prometheus Bound (by Aeschylus), Oedipus the King (by Sophocles), Medea (by Euripides) and The Frogs (by Aristophanes). Sukla's translations were staged in various colleges and universities. He wrote two historical plays on Odia freedom fighters Chakhi Khuntia and Jayee Rajguru that were widely staged. Amateur theater groups and drama competitions operate there. Opera is commercially viable.

=== Science fiction ===
Popular science fiction writers include Prana Krushna Parija, Padmashree Binod Kanungo, Prof Gokulananda Mohapatra, Prof Gadadhar Mishra, Prof Kulamani Samal, Sarat Kumar Mohanty, Prof Amulya Kumar Panda, Dr. Nikhilanand Panigrahy, Dr. Debakanta Mishra, Dr.Ramesh Chandra Parida, Sashibhusan Rath, Dr. Chitta Ranjan Mishra, Dr. Nityananada Swain, Dr. Choudhury Satybrata Nanda, Er. Mayadhar Swain, Kamalakanta Jena, Himansu Sekhar Fatesingh and Bibhuprasad Mohapatra.

Nikhilanand Panigrahy's Sampratikatara Anuchintare Bigyan O Baigyanik became popular. Sashibhusan Rath's Vigyan Chinta and Kamalakanta Jena's Gapare Gapare Bigyan (Awarded by Odisha Bigyan Academy 2011) are written for children and adults.

== Odia and world literature ==
=== Odia translation of classics ===
The first foreign book to be translated into Odia was the Bible's New Testament in 1809. It was followed by translation of Hebrew poems by J. Carey in 1814 and John Bunyan's classic The Pilgrim's Progress by A. Sutton in 1820. Madhusudan Rao translated William Cowper's Solitude of Alexander Selkirk as Nirbasitara Vilaapa. Other notable translations include Arnold's and Tennyson's classics translated by Godabarish Mishra and Nilakantha Das, besides translation of Sohrab and Rustum by Radha Mohan Gadanayak and Don Quixote by Govinda Tripathy etc. Prof. Ananta Charan Sukla's translation (with commentary) of Aristotle's Poetics (ଆରିଷ୍ଟୋଟଲଙ୍କ କାବ୍ୟ ତତ୍ତ୍ୱ) published in the late 1960s was only the second translation of this classic in any Indian language. Classics including children's literature were translated by Grantha Mandir Publishers under their "Vishwa Sahitya Granthamala" (World Literature Series) initiative, including Alice in Wonderland translated by Subhendu Mohan Srichandan Singh as Vichitra Deshare Alice (ବିଚିତ୍ର ଦେଶରେ ଆଲିସ୍ ).

=== Translation of Odia works into world languages ===
Translation of Odia literature into other world languages is mostly into English. The most well known translations are Fakir Mohan's novels Six Acres and Half by Rabi Shankar Mishra, Lachhama by Chandan Das and The Penance by Snehaprava Das. Madhusudan Pati has translated Gangadhar Meher's Tapaswini and Pranaya Ballari into English. Other notable translations include Basanti and Greatest Odia Stories by Paul St. Pierre, Gopinath Mohanty's Paraja by Bikram Das, Spark of Light by Valerie Henitiuk, and Kalahandi by Tapan Kumar Pradhan.

=== Odia in United States of America ===
An initiative, Pratishruti, was started to connect literary minded people in North America with their Indian peers. The goal is to expose Indian-Americans to the best writings of Odia writers as well as to cultivate new Odia writers in America.

Black Eagle Books, a non-profit publishing initiative was started in April 2019 to propagate Odia literature globally through publication and translation projects. To encourage new writers, Black Eagle Books started "Black Eagle Books First Book Award". The award for 2019 was given to Niharika Mallick for her translation anthology of contemporary Hindi short stories in Odia, Adhunika Hindi Galpamala.

== See also ==
- Abolakara
- Indian literature
- Indian poetry
- John Beames
- Laxmi Puran
- Madala Panji
- Rebati
- Six Acres and a Third
- Utkala Bhramanam
- Dalit literature#Dalit literature in Odia

== Bibliography ==
- Neukom, Lukas and Manideepa Patnaik. 2003. A grammar of Oriya. (Arbeiten des Seminars für Allgemeine Sprachwissenschaft; 17). Zürich: Seminar für Allgemeine Sprachwissenschaft der Universität Zürich. ISBN 3-9521010-9-5
- Mansingha, Mayadhar (1962) History of Oriya literature Sahitya Akademi, New Delhi
- Sahoo, Krushna Charan (2004) Oriya Lekhaka Paricaya Orissa Sahitya Academy, Bhubaneswar, ISBN 81-7586-097-9, ISBN 978-81-7586-097-1
- Myers, Carol Fairbanks (1976) Women in Literature: Criticism of the Seventies Scarecrow Press, Inc. Metuchen, ISBN 0-8108-0885-4
- "The History of Orissa: An Introduction"Pages from the history of India and the sub-continent:SOUTH ASIAN HISTORY
- Sahoo, Dr. Basanta Kishore Sahoo (1995) Who's who in Oriya Children's – Literature, Vol. I&II Mayur Publication and RIOCL, ISBN 8186040447
