= Nikhilanand =

Nikhilanand or Nikhilananda is both a given name and a surname. Notable people with the name include:

- Nikhilanand Panigrahy (born 1947), Indian science writer and columnist
- Nikhilananda Sar (born 1936), Indian politician
- Swami Nikhilanand, Canadian-born Hindu spiritual leader
