= Manohar Meher =

- Born: 24 March 1885(On the day of Sri Ram Navami); Odisha, India
- Died: 4 December 1969 (aged 84)
- Citizenship: India
- Children: Narayan Bharasa Meher
- Writing career
- Pen name: Gana Kabi or Palli Kabi of Western Odisha
- Language: Odia
- Genre: Poet
- Subject: Devotion
- Notable work: Manohar Padyavali (To be published)

Manohar Meher was an Indian Odia language poet. He is regarded as Gana-Kavi or Palli-Kavi of Western Odisha in the arena of Odia literature. Born on the sacred day of SriRama-Navami of 1885 A.D., Poet Manohar died on 4 December 1969. He has written numerous poems related to Indian heritage, patriotism, social reformation, Odia culture and other similar matters. His complete works named as Manohar Granthavali is yet to be published.

Some distinguished writers and researchers have written articles on the literary works and life of Manohar Meher:

- "Simantara Dipashikha Kavi Manohar Meher" Written by Mahendra Kumar Mishra and Published by Khariar Sahitya Samiti, Khariar, Dist-Nuapada, Orissa, 1996.
- "Manohar Padyavali" Written by Poet Manohar Meher and Edited by Harekrishna Meher, 1985.

Several books of the poet have been published by different publishers: Arunodaya Press, Cuttack; Dasharathi Pustakalaya, Cuttack; Bani Bhandar, Brahmapur; Narayan Bharasa Meher, Sinapali, Nuapada;Durga Press, Cuttack; Mahalakshmi Bhandar, Cuttack; Swarajya Press, Brahmapur; Odisha Jagannath Company, Cuttack; Dharma Grantha Store, Cuttack; Lakshmi Pustakalaya, Cuttack; Chandi Pustakalaya, Cuttack; Akhila Press, Bhawanipatna; Sanyasi Pustakalaya, Brahmapur.
