= Nikhil Mohan Pattnaik =

Indian scholar, scientist and author

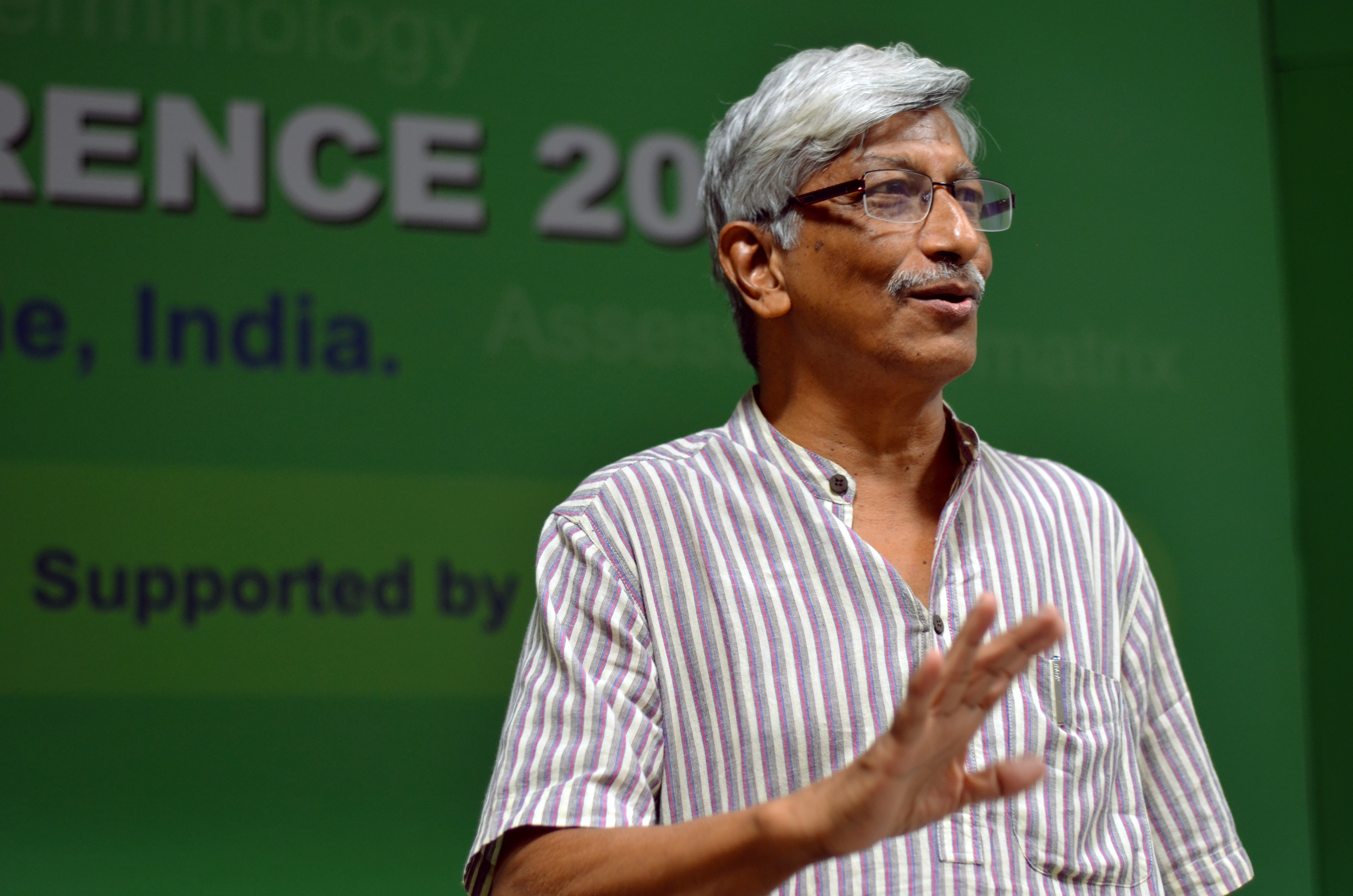
- Pattnaik speaking during FUEL GILT Conference 2014, Pune.
- Born: Cuttack, Odisha
- Citizenship: Indian
- Education: Indian Institute of Technology Kanpur (M.Tech); University of Chicago (PhD)
- Spouse: Puspashree Pattnaik
- Scientific career
- Fields: Biochemistry, Popular Science

Nikhil Mohan Pattnaik is an Indian scholar, scientist, and science author. He obtained a PhD from the University of Chicago in Biochemistry.

Nikhil Mohan Pattnaik speaking during FUEL GILT Conference 2014, Pune

== Early life ==
Pattnaik was born in Cuttack in the Indian state of Odisha.

== Marriages ==
Pattnaik is married to Puspashree Pattnaik.

== Academic career ==
Pattnaik obtained Master of Science (Chemistry) from Indian Institute of Technology, Kanpur, in 1971 and PhD (Biochemistry) from University of Chicago, Illinois, USA, in 1976.

== Travel to United States in 1970s ==
Pattnaik traveled to Chicago for research at the University of Chicago. He worked with activity-based science education and extracurricular science activities with studies and research in political realism, youth based scientific research, and building science related educational systems. He worked as a Biochemistry research scientist until 1991.

== Return to Odisha ==
In 1983 Pattnaik returned to Odisha and he started working with Eklavya foundation and Kerala Sastra Sahitya Parishad. He launched "Bharat Gyan Bigyan Jatra", a campaign with the theme 'people's science' using folk art as the medium to simplify science.

== Foundation of Srujanika ==
In 1983 Pattnaik founded Srujanika, a science education and research non-profit in Bhubaneswar. The philosophy behind Srujanika's work has been "learning with things around" which promotes science activities for children with readily available material. Groups involved in the "Bharat Gyan Bigyan Jatra" campaign started a science journal "Bigyana Taranga". In 2004 Pattnaik supported "Project Rebati" at Srujanika for creating awareness for Linux and Open Source software, and Oriya language localization. Pattnaik also initiated the project "Open Access to Oriya Books", building low-cost tools for digitizing old Oriya books and periodicals, and open source processing software in collaboration with National Institute of Technology, Rourkela and Pragati Utkal Sangh. This project resulted in digitizing the Purnachandra Ordiya Bhashakosha, a seven-volume, 9,500-page, four-language lexicon compiled by Gopala Chandra Praharaj. In addition to the digitization of other 1,300,000 pages from sixty-one old and rare magazines and editions of fourteen newspapers published between 1850 and 1950, Oriya dictionaries published between 1811 and 1942 were digitized and compiled as the three-volume collection "Odia Bhasa Sadhana". Pattnaik has authored the Oriya adaptation of The Man Who Knew Infinity on the life and work of Indian mathematician Srinivas Ramanujan.

== Publications ==
Pattnaik has authored several technical papers, compilations, and one guidebook.

- Pattnaik, Nikhil Mohan (1976), "Enzymatic Probes of Lipoprotein Structure and Function" [Action of Lipolytic Enzymes on Human Serum High Density Lipoproteins] (PDF), University of Chicago, Department of Biochemistry, Chicago, p. 168
- Pattnaik, Nikhil Mohan (2010), "Science for the Odia Public" (PDF), National Institute of Science Communication and Information Resources, vol. 2, no. 1–2, New Delhi, India (published 2014), pp. 86–120 – via Journal of Scientific Temper
- Pattnaik, Nikhil Mohan (2010), "Science writing in Oriya (1850-1950)" [An Electronic Compilation of Science Articles and Books in Oriya Language] (PDF), Vigyan Prasar, New Delhi
- Pattnaik, Nikhil Mohan, "Exploring Nature" [A guidebook on activity based nature study] (PDF), National Council for Science & Technology Communication, New Delhi, p. 127
- Pattnaik, Nikhil Mohan (2003), "Bikasa pain binasa" [(Oriya translation of Arundhati Roy's 'Greater common good')], Srujanika (in Odia), Bhubaneswar
