= Srujanika =

Indian non-profit organization

- ସୃଜନିକା
- Founded: 1983; Bhubaneswar, Odisha, India
- Founder: Nikhil Mohan Pattnaik, Puspashree Pattnaik
- Purpose: Research and innovation for science, education and development with a focus on Odia language
- Location: Bhubaneswar, Odisha, India
- Region served: India
- Method: "Bigyan Tarang" and other publications
- Key people: Nikhil Mohan Pattnaik (Co-founder and head), Puspashree Pattnaik (Co-founder)
- Employees: ~10 volunteers
- Website: odiabibhaba.in/en/

Srujanika (IPA: /sɔrud͡ʒɔnikaː/) is an Indian nonprofit organisation headquartered in Bhubaneswar, Odisha. It works for research and innovation in science, education and development with a focus on Odia language. It has published a popular science books, and periodicals like Bigyan Tarang since 1988-89 that has 17 volumes and 105 issues. The organization was founded in 1983 by a couple Nikhil Mohan Pattnaik and Puspashree Pattnaik. It scanned a large volume of public domain and other books including 26 Odia dictionaries, all the 105 issues of Bigyan Tarang and other publications of their own. Srujanika collaborated with National Institute of Technology, Rourkela Pragati Utkal Sangha to create an Open Access repository called Open Access to Oriya Books that contains 561 digitally scanned books. On 12 November 2017, Srujanika launched their brand new website odiabibhaba.in containing digitised books, dictionaries, magazine and newspaper archives, reference material, language methods and other information.

== History ==
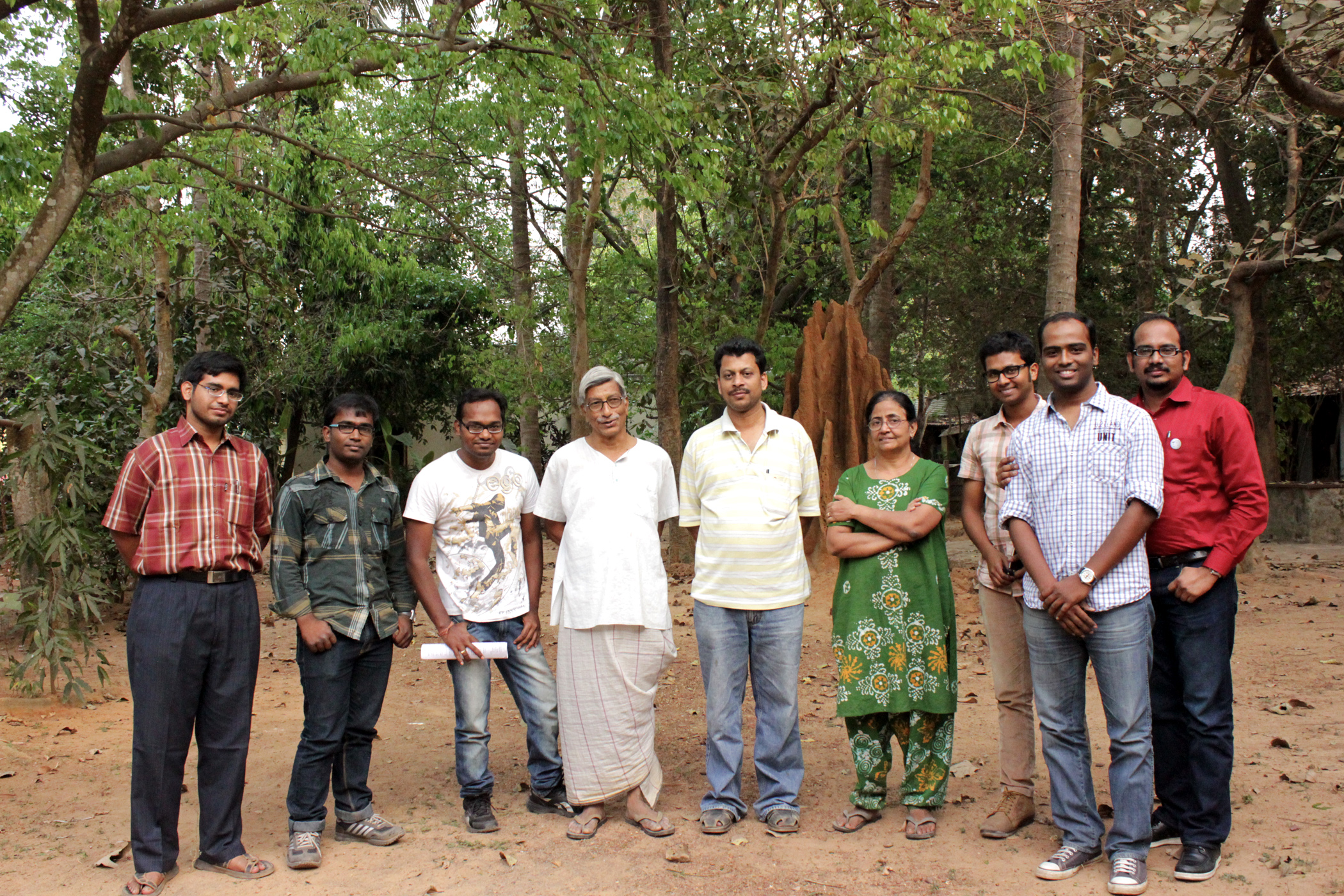
Srujanika founder Nikhil Mohan Pattnaik, Puspashree Pattnaik and a volunteer member along with Odia Wikipedians.

In 1983, Nikhil Mohan Pattnaik and Puspashree Pattnaik founded Srujanika, a science education and research non-profit in Bhubaneswar. The philosophy behind Srujanika's work has been "learning with things around" which promotes science activities for children with readily available material. Groups involved in the "Bharat Gyan Bigyan Jatra" campaign started a science journal "Bigyan Tarang". In 2004 Pattnaik supported "Project Rebati" at Srujanika for creating awareness for Linux and Open Source software, and Oriya language localization. Pattnaik also initiated the project "Open Access to Oriya Books", building low-cost tools for digitizing old Oriya books and periodicals, and open source processing software in collaboration with National Institute of Technology, Rourkela and Pragati Utkal Sangh. This project resulted in digitizing the Purnachandra Ordiya Bhashakosha, a seven-volume, 9,500-page, four-language lexicon compiled by Gopala Chandra Praharaj. In addition to the digitization of other 1,300,000 pages from sixty-one old and rare magazines and editions of fourteen newspapers published between 1850 and 1950, Oriya dictionaries published between 1811 and 1942 were digitized and compiled as the three-volume collection "Odia Bhasa Sadhana". Pattnaik has authored the Oriya adaptation of The Man Who Knew Infinity on the life and work of Indian mathematician Srinivas Ramanujan.
