= Chakulia panda =

Sect in Odisha, India

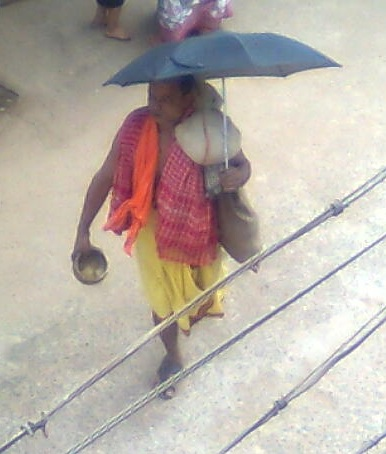
A Chakulia panda walking towards a house in a village in Odisha

Chakulia panda singing at a residential area in Puri, Odisha

Chakulia panda (Odia: ଚକୁଳିଆ ପଣ୍ଡା, pronounced Chåkuḷiā Paṇḍā) is a sect of people from the Indian state of Odisha who are mostly found to live in the southern Odisha. The male members of this sect walk from door to door and recite religious poems, from early Odia literature and receive rice in return from the households. and "suanga" (humorous plays) They are believed to be a "lower class" "dignified" brahmin.

A Chakulia panda would be seen putting a mark of white sandalwood on the forehead, carrying a "chatri" (palm leaf umbrella), and walking with a bag of rice on his shoulder singing songs. Offering rice to Chakulia panda is considered holier as compared to hundred Brahmins. They are heard reciting "Rama, Parasurama, Dasarathanandana Rama, Janakanandini Rama" while visiting houses.

He never asks for alms during the entire course of his visit and accepts whatever is offered. Slowly this cultural presentation is diminishing delimiting the visit of Chakulia panda to houses and of them losing their livelihood.

He carries a bag full of rice, a bag of rice on his shoulder and sings a song "Give and persuade others to give; whatever you give will be returned to you in much larger quantity

— Kunjabihari Das, L. K. Mahapatra

== In popular culture ==
=== Television show "Kalyani" ===
Inspired by the "Chakulia panda" culture, a NACO funded project for spreading awareness about health and safety in Odisha called "Kalyani" was broadcast in Doordarshan during 2000-2006. This program led the foundation of about 2,000 community level "Kalyani Health Clubs" with nearly half million members in rural Odisha. The initiative was also aimed at spreading awareness about AIDS.

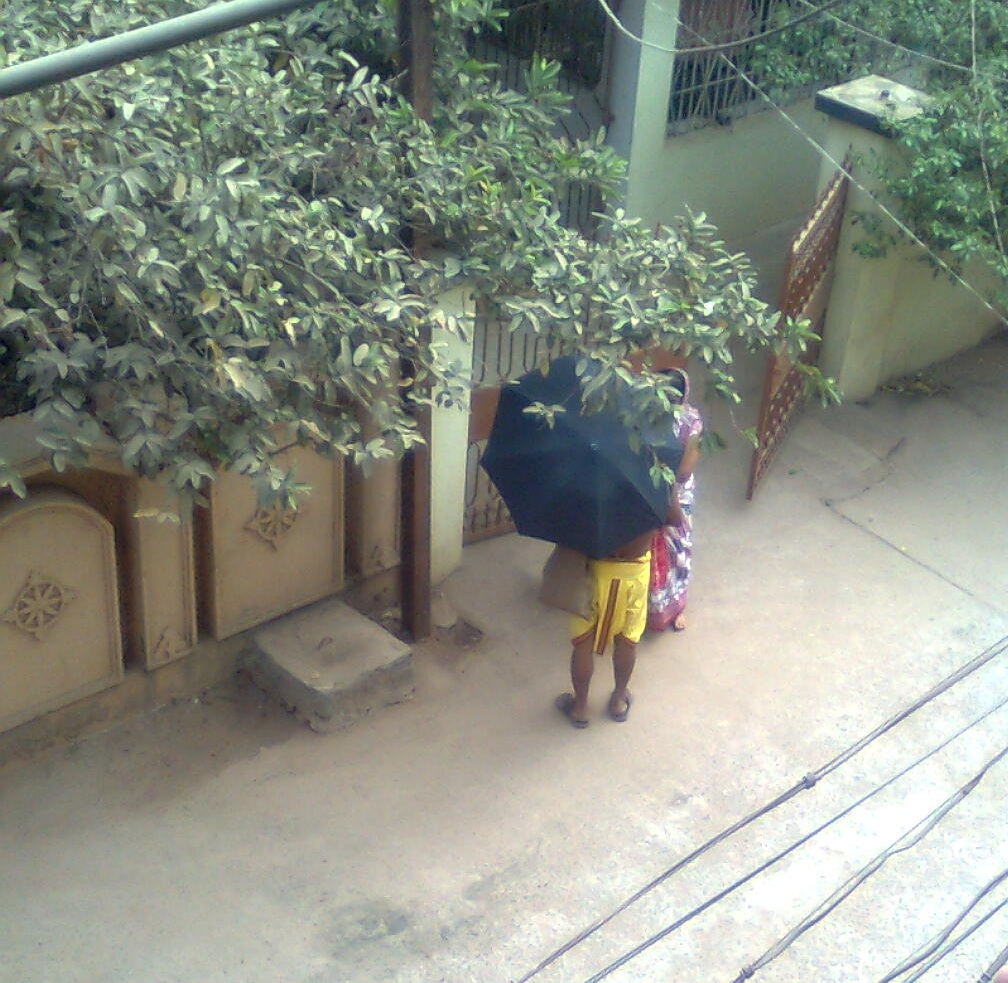
Chakulia panda accepting rice from a house in Odisha

== In literature ==
The story of Chakulia panda is narrated in many folktales in Odisha that have satirical remarks on the greedy nature of Chakulia panda while begging and the moral of him being punished by a deity. They are the most talked-about characters in Odia literature.

== Bibliography ==
- "Chakulia Panda" (folktale)
- "Chakulia Panda Katha" (Gopala Chandra Praharaj)
- "Chandrasekhar Rath: Stories"

== See also ==
- Odia literature
- Culture of Odisha
