= Kalpanakumari Devi =

Indian novelist and poet

- Born: 1936; Cuttack, Khadianta, India
- Died: 28 August 2017 (aged 80–81); Kolkata, India
- Spouse: Kanduri Charan Das
- Writing career
- Language: Odia
- Notable work: Achihna Basbhumi
- Notable awards: Sahitya Akademi Award

Kalpanakumari Devi (1936 – 28 August 2017) was an Indian novelist and poet in the Odia language. She won the 2011 Sahitya Akademi Award for Odia literature.

== Biography ==
Kalpanakumari Devi (also spelled Kalpana Kumari Devi or Debi) was born in Odisha in 1936. She moved to Kolkata in 1958. Her first novel, Kabi, was published in 1954. Her observations on the social changes in the country were recognised.

She was awarded the 2011 Sahitya Akademi Award for Odia literature for her novel Achinha Basabhumi.

She was married to the Odia writer Kanduri Charan Das, who died in 2014. Their daughter Shabarni Das is an editor of a Bengali journal, Prathama.

Kalpanakumari Devi died in Kolkata on 28 August 2017.

== Controversy ==
After Kalpanakumari Devi's Achinha Basabhumi was nominated for the Sahitya Akademi award, several Odia litterateurs protested against it, citing procedural irregularities as well critical differences with the choice. Upon the announcement of the award to the author, Barendra Krushna Dhal, a member of the Sahitya Akademi's advisory board resigned in protest. Sricharan Pratap Kanishka, an Odia writer, filed a public interest litigation with the Orissa High Court in January 2012 against the award, leading to an interim stay of the presentation ceremony. His complaint was that, in order to be eligible for the award, the book should have been published between 2007 and 2009, and he accused the book's publisher of having back-dated its publication date to 2009, whereas, he claimed, it was published in 2010.

The litigation was rejected by the high court on 14 February 2012, and Kalpanakumari Devi received the award.

== Selected works ==
- Kabi. Calcutta. 1954.
- Nastachanda. Calcutta: Pranakrsna Dasa. 1958.
- Srusti o Pralaya. Calcutta: Pranakrsna Dasa. 1959.
- Se prema nitrna. Calcutta: Rajasri Prakasani. 1960.
- Bana ketakī. Oḍiśā jagannātha kampānī. 1963.
- Dinantara ranga. Calcutta: Rajasri Prakasani. 1967.
- Sunila sihara. Calcutta: Rajasri Prakasani. 1968.
- Achinha Basabhumi. Kahani. 2009.
