= Gourishankar Ray =

Indian socio-political activist, journalist and editor (1838–1917)

Karmaveer Gourishankar Ray
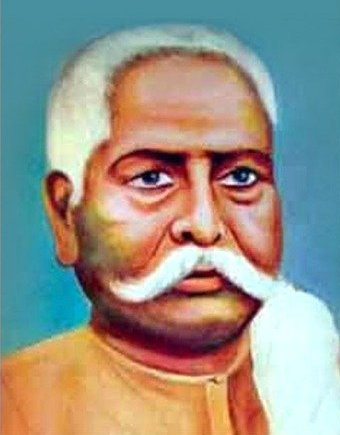
- Portrait of Gourishankar Ray
- Born: 13 July 1838; Dixitpada, Asureswar, Cuttack, Bengal Presidency, British India
- Died: 7 March 1917 (aged 78); Cuttack, Bihar and Orissa Province, British India
- Education: Cuttack School; Hooghly College
- Occupations: Journalist, editor, social reformer, translator
- Employer(s): Cuttack Printing Company; District Judge Court, Cuttack
- Known for: Co-founding Utkala Deepika (the first weekly Odia newspaper)
- Movement: Save Odia Movement (Odia Bhasha Andolan)
- Parent(s): Sadashib Prasad Ray (father); Annapurna Devi (mother)
- Relatives: Rama Sankar Ray (brother)
- Website: www.karmaveergourishankar.info

Gourishankar Ray (13 July 1838 – 7 March 1917), popularly honored with the epithet Karmaveer Gourishankar, was a prominent socio-political reformer, journalist, and cultural leader recognized among the foundational makers of modern Odisha. He was a pivotal architect of the Save Odia Movement during the late nineteenth century, working to defend the native Odia language from administrative displacement by Bengali, Hindi, and Telugu in coastal, western, and southern Odisha respectively.

Tracing his ancestry to a Zamindar Kayastha lineage from East Bengal that had permanently settled in Odisha, Ray dedicated his life to regional linguistic conservation, modern printing crafts, and institutional reform. He pioneered co-operative publication in the region by co-founding the Cuttack Printing Company and launching Utkala Deepika in 1866, the first weekly newspaper published in the Odia language. Under his editorship, the periodical became an instrument of socio-political awakening and emerging nationalism in British India.

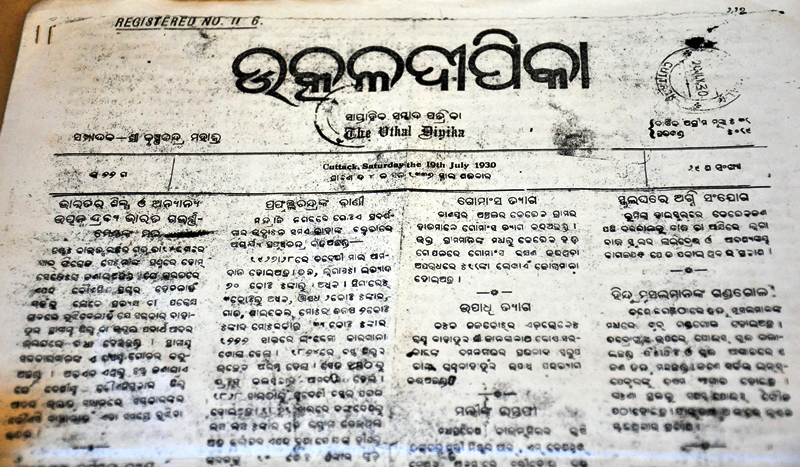
First Odia newspaper Utkala Deepika that was published by Gourishankar Ray

== Biography ==
=== Early life and education ===
Gourishankar Ray was born on 13 July 1838 (corresponding to the Hindu calendar date of Aashadh Shukla Chaturdashi) in Dixitpada village, located within the Asureswar region of Cuttack district, Odisha. He was born to Sadashib Prasad Ray and Annapurna Devi. He completed his primary education at the local village Pathasala before attending a traditional Maqtab to learn Persian.

In 1848, he moved to Cuttack to pursue formal schooling at the Cuttack School (later renamed the Ravenshaw Collegiate School). After securing a Junior Scholarship in 1855, Ray traveled to West Bengal in 1856 to pursue higher college education at Hooghly College, a journey he reportedly completed on foot and by bullock cart over a period of 22 days. He received his proficiency certificate in English in 1858.

=== Early career and public service ===
Ray began his professional career in 1858 as a teacher in Balasore, where his students included future prominent luminaries of the Odia renaissance, such as poet Radhanath Ray, patron Baikuntha Nath Dey, and statesman Madhusudan Das. In 1859, he returned to Cuttack to join the British administrative apparatus at the Commissioner's Office as a Money Order Agent. The same year, he founded the Youngmen's Association, which marked the first structured public welfare organization in the region.

In 1864, Ray established the Cuttack Printing Company on a co-operative basis, assuming a role as its founder-member when it became fully functional in 1865.

=== The Great Famine and Utkal Deepika ===
During the devastating Orissa famine of 1866 (Na'Anka Durbhiksha), Ray organized a public Volunteer Corps to distribute relief and save famine-stricken citizens. He submitted a series of comprehensive memoranda to the British authorities demanding direct infrastructural relief, better irrigation, improved communication networks, and the introduction of railway facilities to Odisha.

Concurrently, on 4 August 1866, he launched the weekly newspaper Utkala Deepika, acting as its founder, editor, printer, and manager. He utilized the newspaper to publish investigative accounts exposing administrative mismanagement during the famine, which transformed the weekly into a primary catalyst for the modern Odia renaissance. Ray went on to serve as the editor of the paper for over 50 years.

=== Linguistic activism and Save Odia Movement ===
In 1867, Ray founded and managed the Purana Prakashika Company, a co-operative firm that collected, preserved, and printed palm-leaf manuscripts of classical Odia literature, including the Mahabharat, Ramayan, and various Kavyas from the Adi, Bhakti, and Reeti eras. He also served as the founder-secretary of the Utkal Bhasoddipini Sabha, where he worked on lexicography, compiled an updated Odia almanac, and patronized regional Odissi dance, music, and dramatic theatrical plays.

Between 1868 and 1874, Ray spearheaded the Save Odia Movement to counter administrative attempts to replace Odia with neighboring regional languages in courts and schools. In 1874, he presented a curated collection of ancient Odia pothis (palm-leaf manuscripts) to the British scholar-administrator John Beams to provide definitive textual proof of the standalone philological identity of the Odia language.

=== Socio-political organizations and institutional builder ===
Ray expanded his civic engagements by establishing several progressive organizations in Cuttack, serving as the founder-secretary of the Utkal Ullasini Sabha in 1869 and the Orissa Sabha in 1870. The same year, he joined the Brahmo Samaj and served as its regional secretary. In 1872, he transitioned to a judicial role, joining the District Judge Court in Cuttack as a translator. During this period, he coordinated a public donation campaign that successfully deposited ₹30,000 to fund the upgrade of the Cuttack College, which eventually developed into Ravenshaw University.

Following the death of his wife between 1875 and 1876, Ray lived a solitary life focused entirely on public works. In 1882, the Orissa Sabha was reorganized into the Utkal Sabha (also known as the Utkal Association). Ray served as its secretary until 1915, directing its agenda toward the administrative unification of all Odia-speaking tracts, the formation of a separate Odisha province, the abolition of the colonial salt law, and the introduction of local self-governing bodies such as district boards and municipalities.

=== Later years and political mergers ===
Ray facilitated the merger of the Utkal Sabha with the Indian National Congress in 1886. He represented the region at national Congress sessions, including Madras in 1887, Poona in 1895, and Calcutta in 1896. He retired from government court service in 1892.

In 1898, he took over as the president of the governing body of the Peary Mohan Academy, providing continuous financial endowments to sustain the institution. He co-founded the Coronation Library in 1899 and constructed a dedicated student hostel in 1901 within the Peary Mohan Academy campus, which was subsequently named the "Gourishankar Chhatrabas" in his honor.

In 1903, he became a founding member of the Utkal Sahitya Samaj, a premier literary society dedicated to classical research. During this period, he translated and edited Kalidasa's Raghuvamsha into Odia. He also aligned with Madhusudan Das to join the Utkal Sammilani, actively participating in its statehood campaigns until his death.

=== Death and legacy ===
In his final decade, Ray utilized his personal wealth to fund public infrastructure projects across the province. He established the Kayastha Boarding house at Kathagada Sahi in Cuttack (1904), built a dedicated student hostel for Brahmin youths in Puri (1905), and funded a stone transport bridge over the Kendrapara Canal (1906). In 1909, he built the iconic Cuttack Town Hall using his personal funds. He also established a rest house and a medical dispensary in his native village of Dixitpada before his death on 7 March 1917 at the age of 78.

== See also ==
- Utkal Deepika
- Madhusudan Das
- Odia literature
