= Abolakara =

Abolakara ଅବୋଲକରା
- Created by: Anonymous

In-universe information
- Nickname: Abola
- Gender: Male
- Title: Rasika Sekhara Cuḍāmaṇi
- Occupation: Servant
- Religion: Hindu
- Nationality: Indian
- Race: Odia

Abōlakarā (Odia: ଅବୋଲକରା) is a fictional character used in prose, poetry and short stories of the Odia literature of India's Odisha state. Literally Abōlakarā means a disobedient person in the Odia language.

== Background of the character ==
Abolakarā is the servant of a learned person (named as Sānta, the master), who takes Abolakara wherever he goes with him. During the day time they travel, and after the dusk 'Sānta' asks 'Abola' to stop with a saying,

ପକା କମଳ ପୋତ ଛତା, ଶୁଣ ଅବୋଲକରା କହୁଛି କଥା ॥ (pakā kamaḷa pōta chatā, śuṇa abōlakarā kahuchi kathā)

Translation: Hey dear Abolakara! spread the blanket on the ground, and cover it with the umbrella. Come here and I will tell you stories.

Abolakara takes care of Sānta and in return, he tells him stories. These stories were titled as "Abolakarā Kāhāṅi".

== Literature ==
In Odia literature the stories of Abolakarā coined as "Abolakara Kāhāṅi", "Abolakarā ubacha" as drama and other literary forms.

=== Sample text from literature ===
ଦକ୍ଷିଣ ଦେଶରେ ସିନ୍ଧୁ ନାମକ ଏକ ରାଜ୍ୟ ଥିଲା । ସେଠାରେ ବୀରବାହୁ ବୋଲି ଜଣେ ରାଜା ଥିଲେ । ତାଙ୍କର ଦୁଇଟି ରାଣୀ ଥାନ୍ତି । ବଡ଼ରାଣୀର ନାମ ପ୍ରେମଶିଳା, ସାନ ରାଣୀର ନାମ କନକମଞ୍ଜରୀ । ତା ଠାରେ ରାଜା ବଡ଼ ସ୍ନେହ କରୁଥାନ୍ତି । ବଡ଼ ରାଣୀଟିକୁ ଦେଖି ପାରନ୍ତି ନାହିଁ । କେତେ ଦିନ ଗଲାପରେ ଦୈବଯୋଗେ ବଡ଼ ରାଣୀର ଗୋଟେ ପୁଅ ଜନ୍ମ ହେଲା । ବଡ଼ ରାଣୀର ପୁଅ ହେବ ଦେଖି ସାନରାଣୀ ମନେ ମନେ ଚିନ୍ତାକରି ବିଚାରିଲା, ତାର ତ ପୁଅ ହେଲାଣି ସେ ରାଜ୍ୟ ପାଇବ, ଭଲ ମନ୍ଦ ହେଲେ ରାଜା ମୋତେ ନିଶ୍ଚେଁ ରାଜ୍ୟରୁ ତଡ଼ିଦେବେ । ମୁଁ ଏବେ କି ଉପାୟ କରିବି ?

In Roman Script - dakṣiṇa dēśarē sindhu nāmaka ēka rājẏa thilā ।sēṭhārē bīrabāhu bōli jaṇē rājā thilē ।tāṅkara duiṭi rāṇī thānti ।baḍarāṇīra nāma prēmaśiḷā sāna rāṇīra nāma kanakamañjarī ।tā ṭhārē rājā baḍa snēha karuthānti ।baḍa rāṇīṭiku dēkhi pāranti nāhi ।kētē dina galāparē daibayōgē baḍa rāṇīra gōṭē pua janma hēlā ।baḍa rāṇīra pua hēba dēkhi sānarāṇī manē manē cintākari bicārilā tāra ta pua hēlāṇi sē rājẏa pāiba bhala manda hēlē rājā mōtē niścē rājẏaru taḍidēbē ।mu ēbē ki upāẏa karibi ?

English Translation - In the southern regions, there was a kingdom called Sindhu. Its ruler was a king named Birabahu. He had two queens. The older queen was called Premasila, the younger Kanakamanjari. The younger queen was very beautiful, and the king doted on her. He did not care for the older queen at all. It happened that after a while, the older queen gave birth to a son. Learning of this, the younger queen thought to herself, "She has borne a son who will rule someday. The first chance the king gets he will probably banish me from the kingdom. What am I going to do now?"

=== Books ===
- Short story
  - Mohanty, Abhaya Charan. Abolakara kahani : prathama bhaga. Dharmagranth Store, Cuttack. 118 p. (Part I)
  - Mohanty, Abhaya Charan. Abolakarā Kāhāṅi : dvitiya bhāga (Part II)
  - Mohanty, Abhaya Charan. Abolakarā Kāhāṅi : trtiya bhāga (Part III)
- Poetry
  - Das, Manoj. Kabita Utkala
