= Puspashree Pattnaik =

Indian Odia-language science author

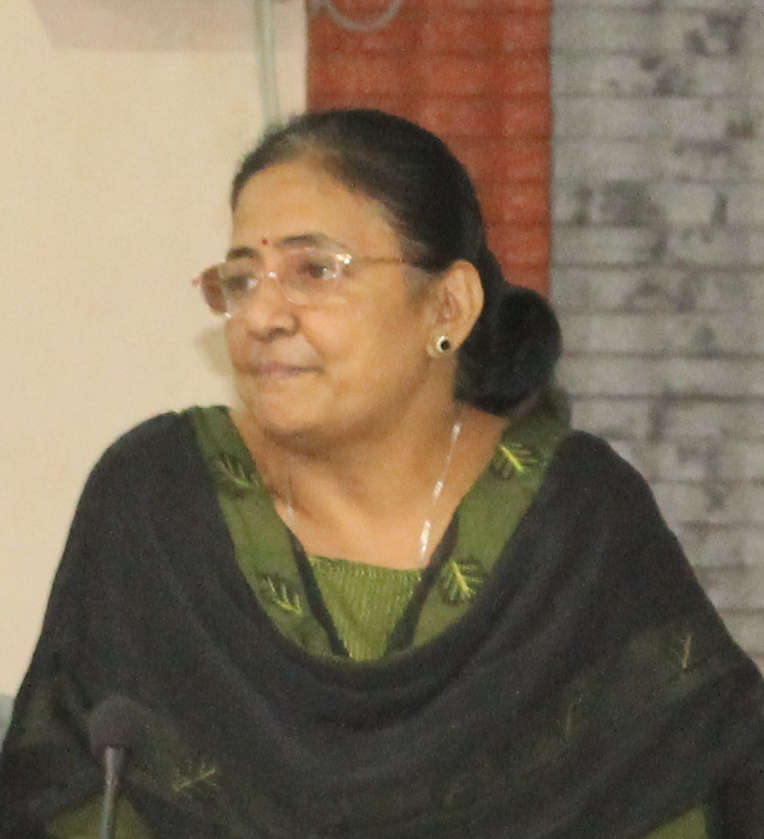
- Pattnaik in Bhubaneswar during a Wikisource event (2015)
- Born: 1958 (age 67–68); Puri, Odisha, India
- Education: Utkal University
- Occupations: Educator; author; activist; archivist
- Spouse: Nikhil Mohan Pattnaik
- Awards: Pranakrushna Parija Popular Science Award (1997)

Puspashree Pattnaik is an Indian educator, popular science author, activist and archivist. She is known for her contribution to the fields of science education, popular science, environmentalism, and archiving. Exploring Nature is a book by her. She co-founded nonprofit Srujanika that focuses on research and innovation in science, education, and development with an emphasis on the Odia language, along with her husband Nikhil Mohan Pattnaik. Pattnaik co-founded the children's educational initiative Integral Education Centre at Srujanika and co-edited the organization's magazine Bigyana Tarang. The Odisha Bigyan Academy awarded her the Pranakrushna Parija Popular Science Award for the book, Kahinki Bhai Kahinki in 1997.

== Early life and education ==
Puspashree Pattnaik was born in Puri, Odisha, India.

Pattnak studied Master of Science in Zoology from Utkal University and Bachelor of Education.

== Career ==
She co-founded Srujanika along with her husband in 1983 with a focus on research and innovation in science, education, and development, specifically with an emphasis on the Odia language. She led the Integral Children Education Centre for children, co-edited popular science magazine Bigyan Taranga and led Srujanika's teacher and student engagement initiatives. She oversaw the organization's archiving activities including archiving large volume of public domain and other books and review of the digitized version of the Purnnachandra Ordia Bhashakosha, and hosting the books on the online portal Odia Bibhaba.

Pattnaik also co-started the Integral Children Education Centre, also known as the Sunday school, in their private house and garden to help children who faced difficulties in getting an education due to various reasons such as lack of interest from parents, financial problems, or belonging to the Dalit communities. The school was completely voluntary, and the children used to come on Sunday afternoons. Instead of set plans or syllabuses, she and other Srujanika volunteers used teaching aids to teach geometry and science subjects.

== Personal life ==
Pattnaik is married to Nikhil Mohan Pattnaik.

== Awards and honours ==
- 1997, Pranakrushna Parija Popular Science Award, awarded by the Odisha Bigyan Academy, for Kahinki Bhai Kahinki

== Bibliography ==
- Pattnaik, Puspashree (17 November 2022). Wildlife of Odisha Mammals. Cuttack: Binod Bihari Bisoi. ISBN 9789395000000.
- Pattnaik, Nikhil Mohan; Pattnaik, Puspashree (2010). Science Writing in Oriya 1850-1950 (PDF). Srujanika; Vigyan Prasar. p. 38.
- Pattnaik, Nikhil Mohan; Pattnaik, Puspashree (2009). Prakr̥ti Kī Prayogaśālā : Gatividhi Ādhārita Prakr̥ti Adhyayana Ke Lie Mārganirdeśikā. New Delhi: Sastā Sāhitya Maṇḍala. ISBN 9788173093951.
- Pattnaik, Nikhil Mohan; Pattnaik, Puspashree (2006). Exploring nature : a guidebook on activity based nature study. Noida, U.P.: Vigyan Prasar. p. 128. ISBN 9788174801128.
- Pattnaik, Nikhil Mohan; Pattnaik, Puspashree; Sahoo, Padmaja Nandini; Senapati, Mamata (1 March 2005). Gijubhāi Śikṣā Nidhi. Bhubaneswar: Srujanika. p. 194.
- Pattnaik, Puspashree; Das, Bimal (1 February 1998). Kāgajaru Ākr̥ti. Bhubaneswar: Srujanika. p. 84.
- Pattnaik, Puspashree (1997). Kahinki Bhai Kahinki. Bhubaneswar.
