= Susmita Bagchi =

Odia writer (born 1960)

- Born: Susmita Panda; 25 September 1960 (age 65); Cuttack, Orissa, India
- Occupations: Lecturer, writer, editor, bureaucrat
- Spouse: Subroto Bagchi
- Parent(s): Harihar Panda (father); Sakuntala Panda (mother)
- Writing career
- Notable works: Children of a Better God; Akasha Jeunthi Katha
- Notable awards: Odisha Sahitya Akademi Award; Prajatantra Award; Gangadhar Rath Foundation Award

Susmita Bagchi (née Panda) is an Indian writer who writes in Odia and English. She has published numerous books of novels short-stories and travelogues. She is the daughter of Sakuntala Panda, a prominent Odia writer and founder of Odia women's monthly Sucharita. She is best known for her short story collection Akasha Jeunthi Katha for which she won Odisha Sahitya Akademi Award in 1992. She is currently heading the Mo school programme.

== Personal life ==
She was born on 25 September 1960 at Cuttack. Her mother Sakuntala Panda was a prominent Odia writer. She did her education in Odisha before her post-graduation in political science and did a stint as a lecturer at Delhi University. She met her future husband Subroto Bagchi when she was fifteen years old. They tied the knot 4 years later.

== Career ==
She wrote her first short story for Sucharita 1982. Her first short story collection Akasha Jeunthi Katha was published in 1990.She followed up with Chhai Sepakhe Manisha. Her Odia novel "Deba Shishu" was about children living with cerebral palsy, It was published in 2006. It was translated into English and published by Penguin as "Children of a Better God" in 2010. She was appointed to head the Mo school programme of Government of Odisha that aims at improving the government and government aided schools in the state.

== Published works ==
- Bagci, Susmita (1990). Akasa yeumthi katha kahe (in Odia). Grantha Mandira. OCLC 22006546.
- Bagci, Susmita (1991). Chai se pakha manisha (in Odia). Sucarita Pablikesansa. OCLC 28114990.
- Bagchi, Susmita (1995). Mo Jharkaru Pruthibi (in Odia). Sucarita Pub.
- Bagci, Susmita (1996). Naibedya (in Odia). Sucarita Pablikesansa. OCLC 40869146.
- Bagci, Susmita (1997). Bhinna kula, anya dheu (in Odia). Sucarita Pablikesansa. OCLC 40869147.
- Bagci, Susmita (1998). Prabasara pakshi (in Odia). Sucarita Pablikesansa. OCLC 47630767.
- Bagci, Susmita (1999). Basudhara prasna (in Odia). Sucarita Pablikesansa. OCLC 47666693.
- Bagci, Susmita (2000). Srotaparnna (in Odia). Sucarita Pablikesansa. OCLC 47666721.
- Bagci, Susmita (2003). Svapna niharika (in Odia). Sucarita Pabalikesansa. OCLC 500150694.
- Bagci, Susmita (2003). Nila akasa, dhala megha (in Odia). Sucarita Pabalikesans. OCLC 500172726.
- Bagci, Susmita (2007). Bimala darsana = Bimala darshan (in Odia). OCLC 903896880.
- Bagci, Susmita; Dasa, Bikrama (2010). Children of a better god. Penguin Books. ISBN 978-0-14-306642-2. OCLC 778788237.
- Bagci, Susmita (2012). Sata tala pani = Saata taala paani (in Odia). OCLC 903873437.
- Bagci, Susmita (2013). Eka patha eka pathika (in Odia). OCLC 989811272.
- Bagci, Susmita (2015). Bidesini = Bideshini (in Odia). OCLC 960106712.
- Bagci, Susmita (2015). Asa pherijiba = Assa-pherijiba (in Odia). OCLC 960106711.
- Bagchi, Susmita (30 September 2016). Beneath a Rougher Sea. Leadstart Publishing Private Limited. ISBN 978-9352016235.
