= Lakshmi Purana =

Odia text of social commentary

The Lakshmi Purana is an Odia text written in the 15th century by Balarama Dasa, a major poet of Odia literature. Despite its name, it is not one of the eighteen major Puranas of Hinduism, having been written in the medieval era as a piece of regional literature that discusses gender and social norms.

== Plot ==
The goddess Lakshmi embarks on a journey outside her shrine of Puri, observing that many were heedless of the fact that it was a holy occasion dedicated to her. Taking the disguise of a Brahmin woman, she offers instructions to a rich trader's wife regarding rituals for her worship. Crossing the bounds of the city, she sees Shriya, a poor, outcaste woman who offers the goddess her worship with rituals, conducted with cleanliness and devotion. Pleased, Lakshmi manifests herself inside Shriya's house and blesses her.

Upon her return to the temple, her husband Jagannath and Balarama refuse her entry on the grounds that she had besmirched herself by entering the house of the outcaste woman. Lakshmi refuses to perform the purification ceremony before entering the temple. She removes her expensive jewellery with the exception of her marital ornaments and leaves in a huff, cursing the brothers by depriving them of her presence that brought well-being and prosperity. Aghast, the brothers take the form of Brahmin mendicants and beg for food from household to household, not receiving any. Finally, they arrive at the newly built house for Lakshmi, where they are informed that it was the house of an outcaste. Relenting, the brothers consent to eat the food prepared by the outcastes and submit to Lakshmi's demands of egalitarianism, recognition of her holy days, and their promotion of communal eating for members of the highest Brahmin to the lowest Chandala. Lakshmi reunites with the gods in the temple at the end.

== Social commentary ==
The text is described as a native precursor to feminism in India, describing the social structures and gender inequality persisting in the society. It is also a protest against male hegemony, with a cast where the male characters of the higher castes are vilified and females of the lower castes are glorified. The text is reminiscent of the rural countryside of Odisha, where both men and women work together in the fields for paddy cultivation without discrimination. It also serves as a guideline for Hindu women to perform their duties and responsibilities in an honest manner, represented by the scene where Lakshmi gives up her jewellery, but not her marital accessories, since she is still a loving wife. Most of the aspects of the text are atypical of the actual Puranas, where some of the most common imageries of Lakshmi are of her massaging the feet of Vishnu, acknowledging him as supreme. As a piece of literature, it suggests that social change is best brought about by promoting empathy to the more unfortunate and by still treating them with respect so that inequality could be fought with love rather than hatred.

== Popularity of Lakshmi Purana ==
In Odisha, Lakshmi Purana is considered as a sacred text in every household. In several parts of Odisha, and the neighboring regions in Chhattisgarh, Jharkhand, West Bengal and the Srikakulam area of Andhra Pradesh, women perform a special one-month-long Lakshmi Puja in the Odia month of Margashira. The Lakshmi Puja (Mana osha) is celebrated weekly on every Thursday of that month, and mostly the females worship Goddess Lakshmi with all rituals.

== See also ==
- Odia Literature
- Odia language
- Odisha
- Jai Jagannatha
