= Kamalakanta Jena =

Popular Science writer

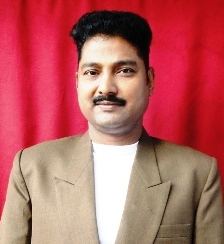
- Born: 25 April 1971 (age 55); Januganj, Balasore, Odisha, India
- Occupation: Lecturer (Physics)
- Writing career
- Notable awards: Orissa Bigyan Academy; Prakruti Bandhu; Bigyan Prachar Samiti

Kamalakanta Jena (Odia: କମଳାକାନ୍ତ ଜେନା) is a popular science writer in Odia.

== Early life and education ==
Jena was born on 25 April 1971 in the village Januganj in Balasore district of Odisha. He completed his matriculation from Remuna High School in Remuna, Balasore in 1986 with First division. He received BSc (Hons) from F. M. College under Utkal University in 1991 in Physics .

After having completed an MSc in 1993 with First Class (Second position in Utkal University), he worked as a Junior Research Fellow in the Regional Research Laboratory in Bhubaneswar.

== Profession ==
At age 28, Jena started working at the OES (Orissa Education Service). In 1999, he started his teaching career at the Department of Physics, Government College, Sundargarh. Since 2013, Jena has been working at Bhadrak Jr/Auto College in Bhadrak, Orissa.

== Literary Works ==
Jena has published over 700 articles in publications like The Prajatantra, The Samaja, The Samaya, The Dharitri, The Pragativadi, Bigyanaloka (Orissa Bigyan Prachar Samiti), Sansar, Meena Bazar, Nandan Kanan, Shisulekha, Sishu Prativa, Pourusha, Yojana, Akshay Urja, NBT Bulletin, Emerging Science, and The Statesman, Science Reporter (NISCAIR). Jena is a Life Member of Orissa Bigyan Academy . Jena works as an associate editor, DIGBALAYA, Orissa Physical Society, Bhubaneswar. He represented Orissa Chapter in the 99th Indian Science Congress of 2012 held in Bhubaneswar. Jena has often participated as a speaker on popular science in radio talk programmes.

== Books ==
=== Science books ===
- Barshaa Bijulira Khela (Vidyapuri, Cuttack),
- Chhota Nuhen Chhota Kathaa (Nalanda, Cuttack, selected by State Library),
- Big Bang Machine (The Book Point, Bhubaneswar),
- Gapare Gapare Bigyan (The Book Point, Bhubaneswar), Awarded by Orissa Bigyan Academy in 2011
- Barshaa Bijuli Ghadaghadi (Vidyapuri, Cuttack

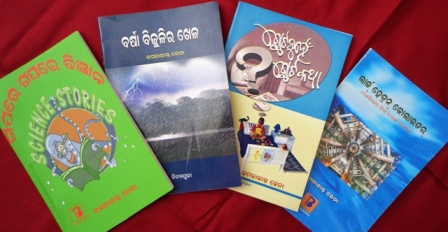
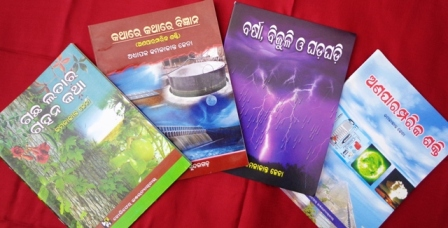
,

=== Text Books ===
- Environmental Education (+2, Vidyapuri, Cuttack),
- Paribesha Shiksha (+2, Vidyapuri, Cuttack),
- Practical Physics (+2, Nalanda, Cuttack),
- Ama Bigyan – Class I (Holy Faith International, Cuttack),
- Ama Bigyan – Class II (Holy Faith International, Cuttack),
- Ama Bigyan – Class III (Holy Faith International, Cuttack),
- Ama Bigyan – Class IV (Holy Faith International, Cuttack),
- 0Ama Bigyan – Class V (Holy Faith International, Cuttack)
- Barsa Bijulira Khela
- Paribesa Sikhya
- Solar cells grow thinner, but glow brighter

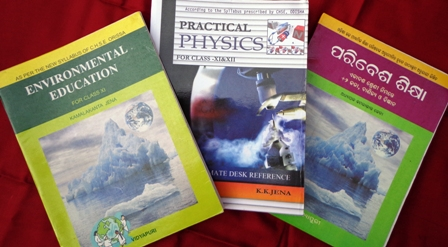
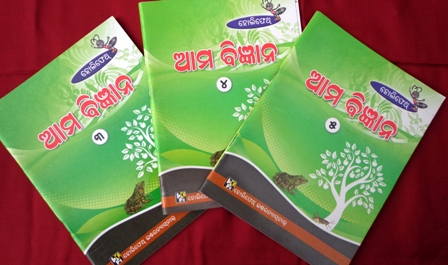
,

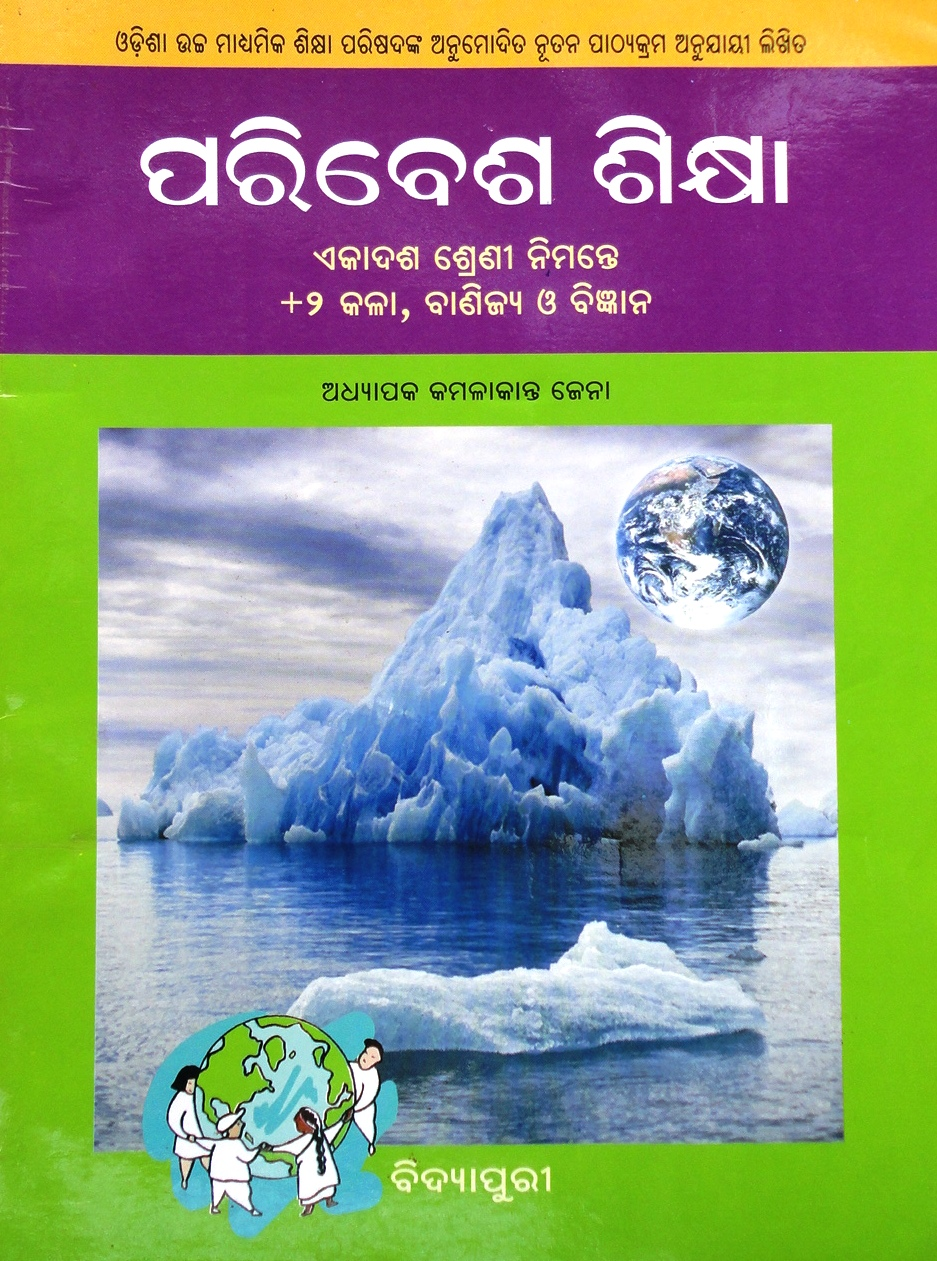
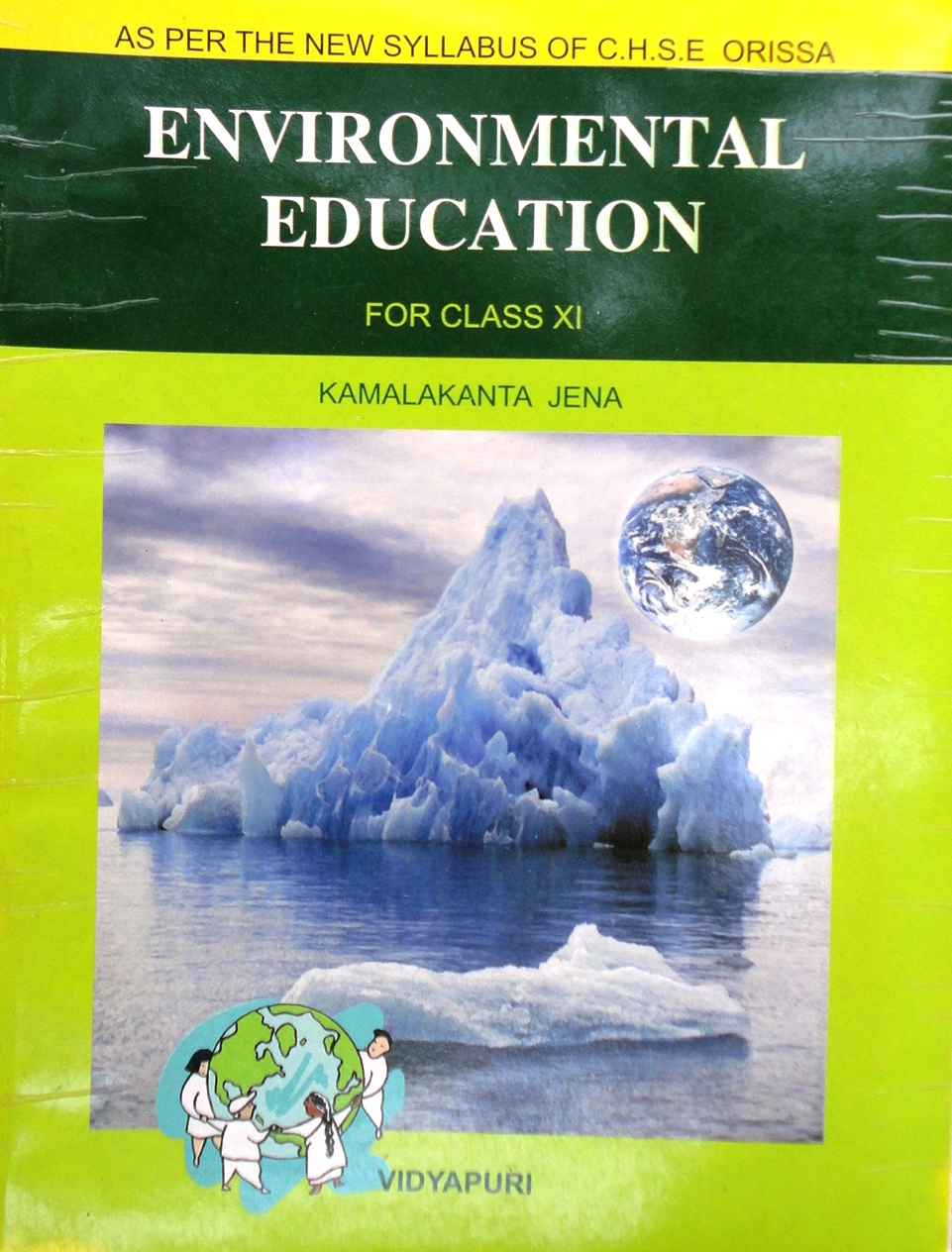
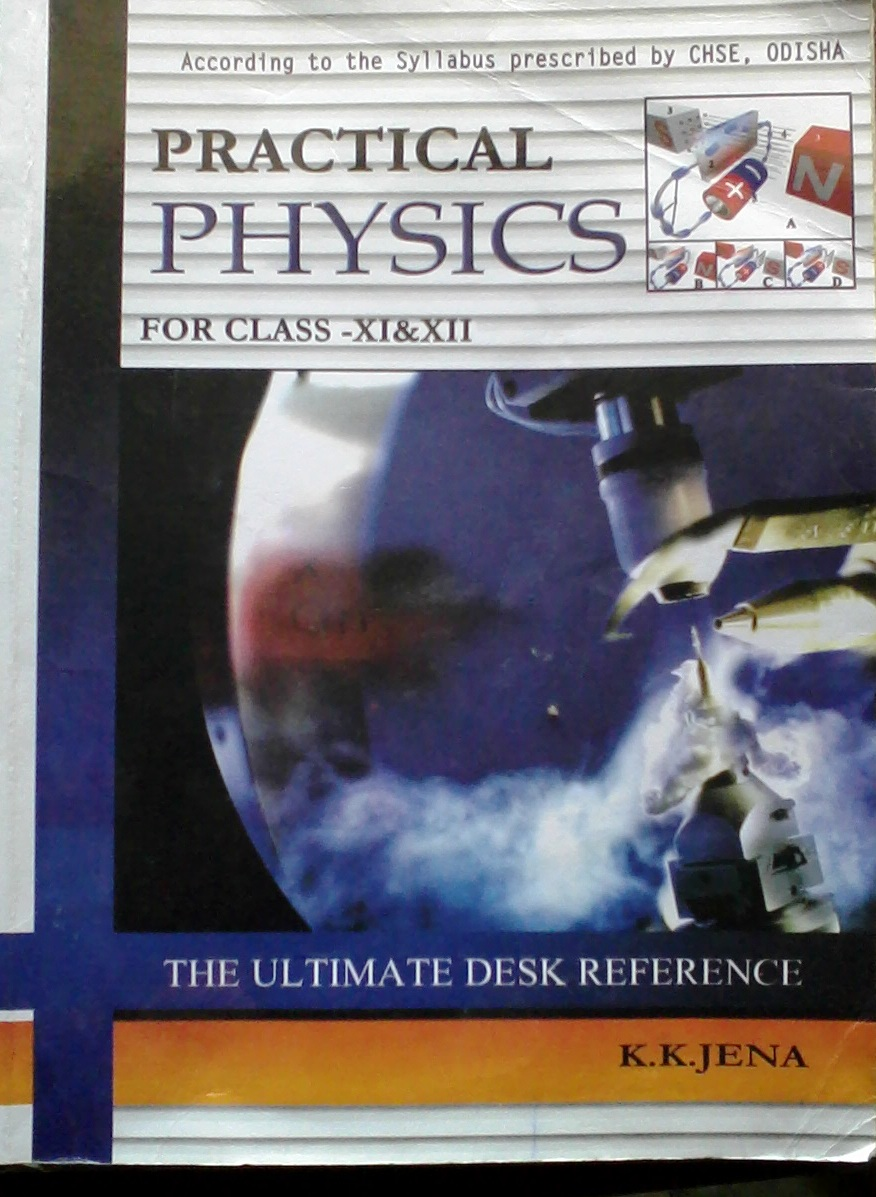
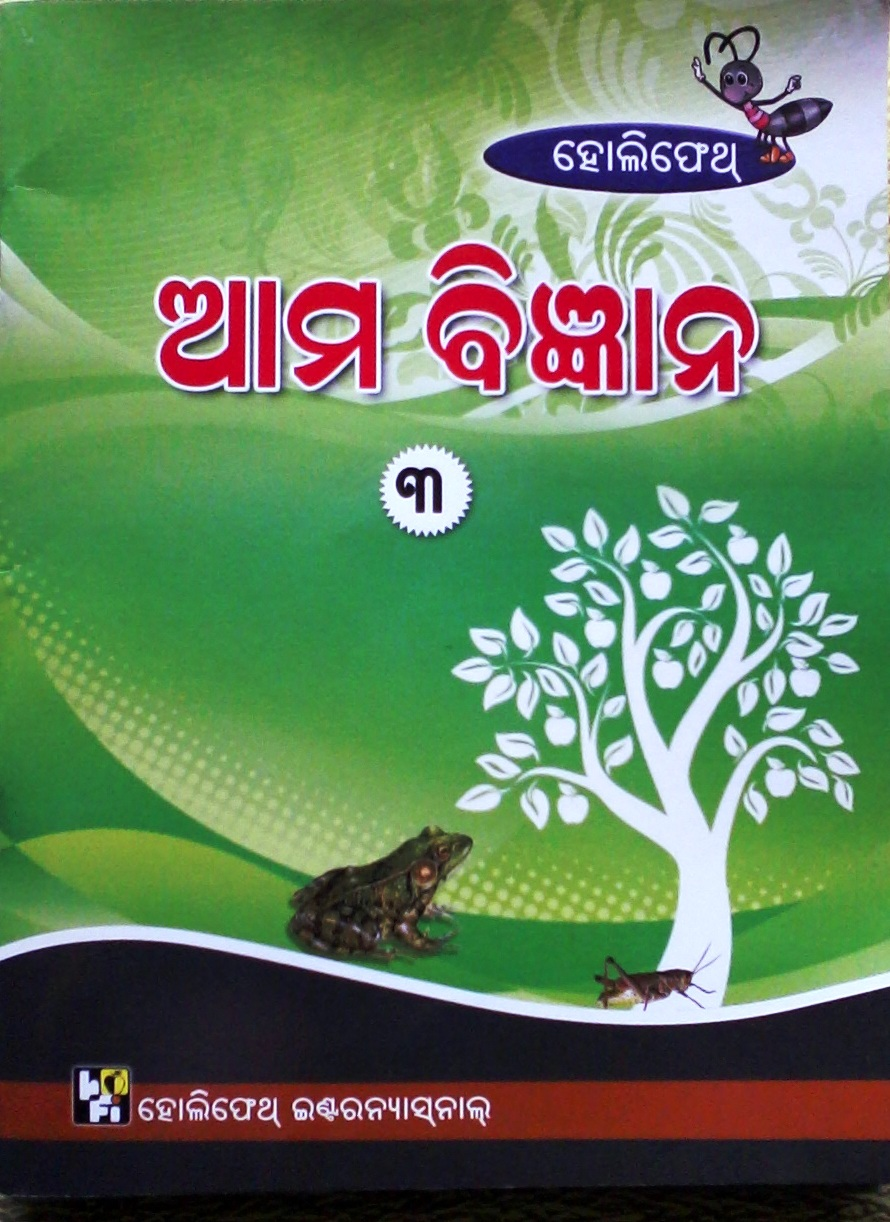
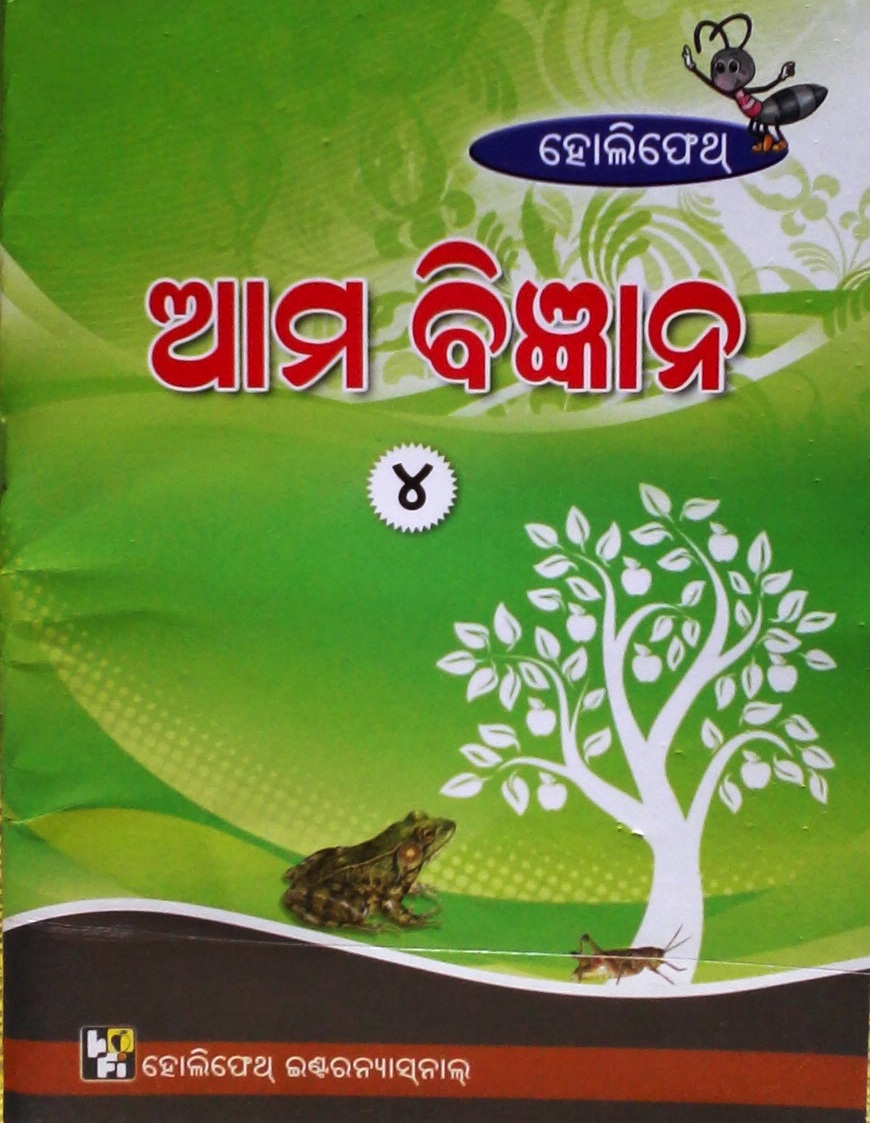
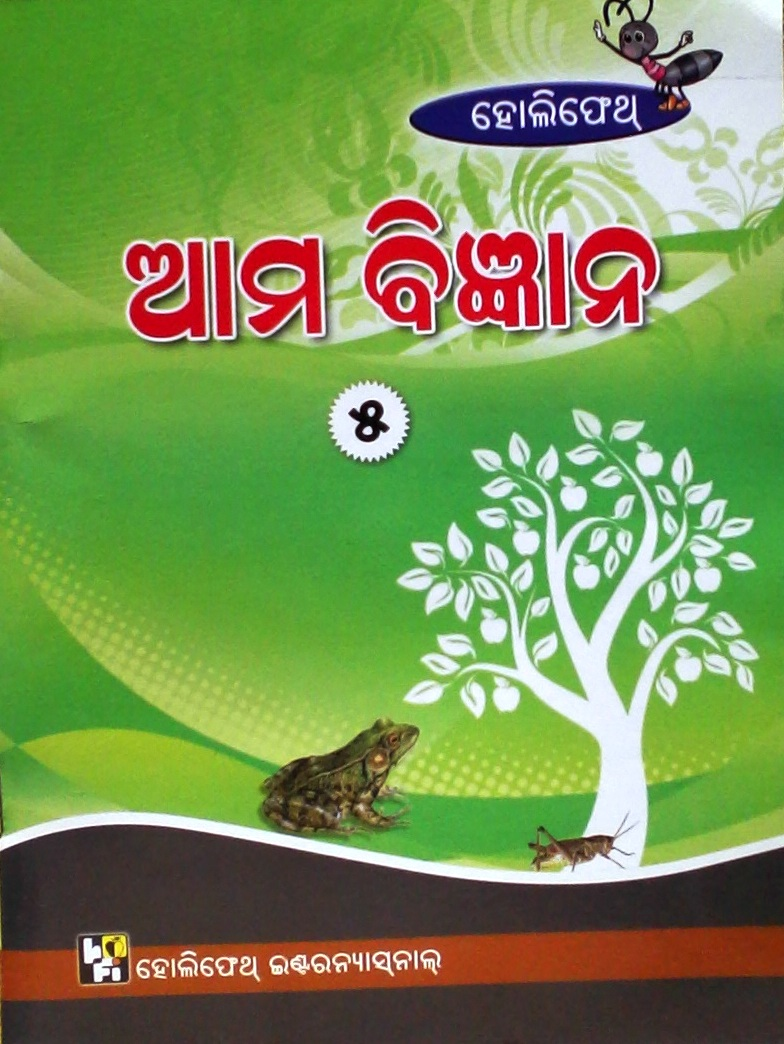
, , , , ,

== Awards ==
Jena received the Orissa Bigya Academy Award for 2011 for his story book Gapare Gapare Bigyan on popular science.

Other awards:

- Award for Innovative Teaching Physics, 2012 Kendriya Vidyalaya, Sundargarh
- Pranakrushna Parija Popular Science Award, 2011, Orissa Bigyan Academy, Bhubaneswar
- Janapriya Bigyan Puraskar, 2010, Bigyan Prachar Samiti, Cuttack
- Naba Pratibha Sammana, 2008, Biswa-Sahitya Seva Sangha, Ctc
- Prakruti Bandhu, 2007, Government of Orissa
- Utkal Prabha, 2007, Neelachakra Prakashan, Puri
- Gopinath Mohanty Pratibha Puraskar, 2005, Bigyan Prachar Samiti, Cuttack

== Publications ==
- Jena, Kamalakanta. Thoughts on Doomsday Catastrophe in 2012. Science Horizon. Orissa Bigyan Academy. July 2011.
