= Ramakanta Rath =

Indian poet from Odisha (1934–2025)

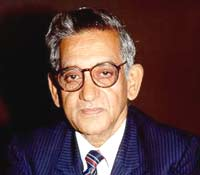
- Born: 13 December 1934; Cuttack, Bihar and Orissa Province, British India
- Died: 16 March 2025 (aged 90); Bhubaneswar, Odisha, India
- Occupation: Poet

Ramakanta Rath (13 December 1934 – 16 March 2025) was an Indian poet who was regarded as one of the most renowned modernist poets in Odia literature. Heavily influenced by the poets such as T. S. Eliot and Ezra Pound, Rath experimented greatly with form and style. The quest for the mystical, the riddles of life and death, the inner solitude of individual selves, and subservience to material needs and carnal desires are among this philosopher-poet's favorite themes. His poetry betrays a sense of pessimism along with counter-aesthetics, and he steadfastly refuses to put on the garb of a preacher of goodness and absolute beauty. His poetry is full of melancholy and laments the inevitability of death and the resultant feeling of futility. The poetic expressions found in his creations carry a distinct sign of symbolic annotations to spiritual and metaphysical contents of life. Often transcending beyond ordinary human capabilities, the poet reaches the higher territories of sharp intellectualism. The contents have varied from a modernist interpretation of ancient Sanskrit literature protagonist Radha in the poem "Sri Radha" to the ever-present and enthralling death-consciousness espoused in "Saptama Ritu" (The Seventh Season).

== Life and career ==
Rath was born in Cuttack, Odisha, British India. He obtained his MA in English Literature from Ravenshaw College in Odisha. He joined the Indian Administrative Service in 1957, but continued his writing career. He retired as Chief Secretary Odisha after holding several important posts in the Central Government such as Secretary to the Government of India. He received the Sahitya Akademi Award in 1977, Saraswathi Samman in 1992, Bishuva Samman in 1990 and India's 3rd highest civilian honour, the Padma Bhushan in 2006. He was the Vice President of the Sahitya Academy of India from 1993 to 1998 and the President of the Sahitya Akademi of India from 1998 to 2003, New Delhi.

In February 2009, he was awarded a Sahitya Akademi Fellowship by the Central Sahitya Akademi, the fifth Odia writer to be so honoured.

A number of his poems have been translated into English and other Indian languages.

After prolonged illness, Rath died on 16 March 2025 at his residence in Bhubaneswar. He was 90.

== Major works ==
=== Poems ===
- "Kete Dinara" (Of a Long Long Time), 1962
- "Aneka Kothari" (Many Rooms), 1967
- "Sandigdha Mrigaya" (Suspicious Hunting), 1971
- "Saptama Ritu" (The Seventh Season), 1977
- "Sachitra Andhara" (Picturesque Darkness), 1982

=== Long poems ===
- Sri Radha (Sri Radha), 1984 (won Saraswati Samman in 1992 for this Poetry)
- Sri Palataka (Mr. Escapist), 1997

== See also ==
- List of Indian poets
- Odia literature
- Odia language
