= Hiranmayee Mishra =

Indian novelist and poet

Hiranmayee Mishra is a novelist and poet from Bhubaneswar, Odisha, India.

== Life ==
Mishra was born to novelist Madan Mohan Mishra and Anasuya Mishra. She has two older brothers and a younger one. Her elder sister, Chinmayee Sarangi, is also a writer. She is an alumnus of Utkal University. She had completed her PhD from University of York, England, UK. Mishra teaches Political Science and Women's Studies at the Udayanath Autonomous College of Science & Technology, Adaspur, Cuttack. She is a novelist and poet and also the director of Centre for Women's Studies.

== Books ==
Her literary works include:

- Gotie Barsaratira Kahani
- Prathama
- Kinnarira Kabya
- Nila Rangara Nisha
- Basnayita Rati
- Kete Dure Mora Priya Desha (travelogue)
- Bibhorbela (poetry)
- Megha Pakhira Geeta (novel)
- Anyatama Priyatama(Novel)
- Gotie sakala Pain(Novel)
- kalijai o annyanya kahani
- Ratira Sathi
- Hiranmayee Mishranka Prema katha
- Gotie pahadara prema katha
- Rati
- Translation of Illeana Citaristi' s autobiography ' Gotie janama, duiti jeebana'
- Barnaliara kete ranga ( Essay Collection)
- Kinnara ( Edited volume)
- Besya ( Edited volume)

She has written a book titled, Negotiating privately for an effective role in public space: A case study of women in panchayats of Orissa (2013).

== Recognition ==
In 2007, she was awarded a fellowship by International Ford Foundation, USA which took her to UK for three years to pursue a PhD in Women's Studies in University of York, England, On her coming back in 2011, she was awarded Timepass Booker Award for her story collection, Ratira Sathi. In 2018, she was awarded the Kanhei Katha Puraskar honour for her contribution to Odia fiction. Previously, she has been awarded with the Bhubaneswar Pustak Mela Fiction Award, Katha Nabaprativa Award, Bharatiya Bhasa Parishad Youth Award, Kadambini Best Fiction Award, Bhubaneswar Behera State Fiction Award, Time Pass Booker Award and others.
