= Sakuntala Panda =

- Born: 10 November 1939; Cuttack, Odisha, India
- Died: 14 February 2017 (aged 77)
- Occupations: Editor, Novelist, Short story writer, Poet
- Spouse: Harihar Panda
- Children: Susmita Bagchi
- Relatives: Subroto Bagchi, Son-in-Law
- Writing career
- Period: Post Colonial
- Notable work: Aneka Dina Pare
- Notable awards: Utkal Bharati Kuntala Kumari Puraskar

Sakuntala Panda was an Indian writer who wrote in Odia language. She was the daughter of a very famous Mathematics teacher, Late Narayana Pati. She published 15 books of poetry, shortstories and travelogues. She also was the founder and editor of Odia women's monthly Sucharita. She was also editor of odia children's monthly Nandanakanan.

== Biography ==
She was born on 10 November 1939 at Cuttack.

She founded a women's magazine in Odia 1975 and edited it for 28 years. She also edited a children's monthly, Nandankanan. She has published 15 books. She was a member of Odia advisory committee of the National Book Trust and the Kendra Sahitya Akademi. She was also a member of Odia Film Censor Board.

== Published works ==
- Panda, Sakuntala (1987). Aneka dina pare (in Odia). Sucarita Pablikesana. OCLC 21598867.
- Panda, Sakuntala (1993). Simahina (in Odia). Sucarita Pablikesansa. OCLC 32467902.
- Panda, Sakuntala (1996). Jerujelamra santha (in Odia). Sucarita Pablikesansa. OCLC 40706538.
- Panda, Sakuntala (1997). Tamasa (in Odia). Sucarita Pablikesansa. OCLC 40706539.
- Panda, Sakuntala (1998). Manikara ghara (in Odia). Sucarita Pablikesansa. OCLC 47666689.
- Panda, Sakuntala (2006). Pakshi udija' (in Odia). OCLC 904715911.
- Panda, Sakuntala (2012). Galpa samagra : aneka dinara aneka katha (in Odia). OCLC 904715915.
- Ratna Dasa; Panda, Sakuntala (1981). Sarasvatagita (in Odia). Paryyatana, Krida, o Samskrti Nirddesalaya, Odisa. OCLC 11371976.
