= Subroto Bagchi =

Indian entrepreneur and business leader

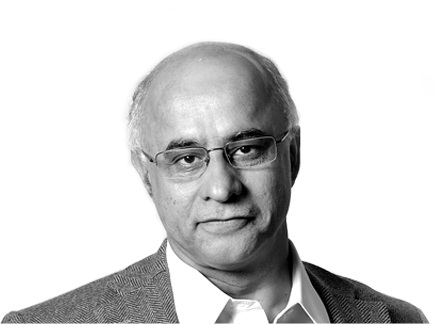
- Born: 31 May 1957 (age 69); Patnagarh, Balangir, Orissa
- Education: Utkal University
- Occupations: Chairman, Odisha Skill Development Authority
- Employer: Government of Odisha
- Title: Independent Director, Mindtree (Retired on 16 July 2019)
- Board member of: Bagchi is a Member of the Governing Council of the Software Technology Parks of India.
- Spouse: Susmita Bagchi – Odia Author
- Website: Subroto Bagchi Blogs

Subroto Bagchi (born 31 May 1957) is an Indian entrepreneur who is the co-founder of Mindtree, an Indian technology MNC.

== Early life and education ==
Bagchi was born to Makhan Gopal Bagchi and Labanya Prava Bagchi in Patnagarh, Odisha, where his father was a junior government servant. He studied political science at Utkal University.

== Professional career ==
He started his work life as a clerk in the Industries Department of the Government of Odisha in 1976, After giving up his post graduate studies. After a year of working there, he qualified to be a management trainee in DCM in 1977 where he worked for the ensuing 5 years. In 1981, he entered the computer industry and worked for a number of computer companies between 1981 and 1999 in various functions like sales, marketing and operations. His longest stint was at Wipro where he became the Chief Executive of Wipro's Global R&D before working for chairman Azim Premji as corporate vice-president, Mission Quality. He left Wipro in 1998 to join Lucent Technologies. He left Lucent a year after to co-found Mindtree in 1999 along with 9 other co-founders. Mindtree was a $1 billion (Fiscal 19), Global IT services company with approximately 20000+ people. It was listed at the National Stock Exchange and the Bombay Stock Exchange in India.

When Mindtree started, Subroto Bagchi began as chief operating officer.

In 2010, he was appointed vice-chairman to the board. On 1 April 2012, he assumed the office of chairman. He stepped down as the chairman in January 2016. On 1 May 2016, at the invitation of the Chief Minister of Odisha, Naveen Patnaik, he took on the full-time role of chairman, Odisha Skill Development Authority in the rank and status of a Cabinet Minister at an annual salary of 1 rupees.

== Bibliography ==
Year	Title
2007	High-Performance Entrepreneur
2008	Go Kiss the World: Life Lessons For The Young Professional
2008	The High Performance Entrepreneur
2009	The Professional
2012	MBA at 16
2013	The Captainship: First-gen Entrepreneurs
2013	The Elephant Catchers
2013	The Professional Companion
2014	On Leadership and Innovation
2017	Sell
2025	The Day the Chariot Moved: How India Grows at the Grassroots
