= Swami Nikhilanand =

Swami Nikhilanand is a Canadian-born Hindu spiritual leader. He is the spiritual teacher at Radha Madhav Dham) one of the largest Hindu Temple complexes in the Western Hemisphere, and the largest in North America.

A sanyasi and disciple of Jagadguruttam Kripalu Maharaj, and a teacher of the worldwide organization Jagadguru Kripalu Parishat with his spiritual teacher's blessings, Nikhilanand regularly delivers speeches, workshops and large family camps throughout the United States. The main aim of his organization, JKP Radha Madhav Dham, is to teach the knowledge of the Hindu scriptures and to teach the practical devotion to God (bhakti yoga).

== Biography ==
Born in Canada and raised a Christian, Nikhilanand is one of many Westerners who has turned to Hinduism in search of answers to spiritual questions.

Nikhilanand was an outdoor education instructor and wilderness guide working on Vancouver Island in Canada for eight years after high school. He earned enough to work just eight months a year and spend the rest traveling, learning about spiritual matters that had drawn him since childhood. He adopted Hinduism in the Radha Madhav Dham Ashram in Austin, Texas — all before he had traveled to the Indian subcontinent. In 2000, he went to India to meet Jagadguru Shree Kripaluji Maharaj, and entered the ashram. Under the guidance of Jagadguru Shree Kripaluji Maharaj, he studied Sanskrit scriptures, meditation and devotional music and was eventually given Sanyasa, or the rank of spiritual teacher and ascetic.

Nikhilanand spends many months every year traveling to cities around America giving week-long "Essentials of Gita" Family Camps which are attended by hundreds of people. The events include speeches, classes, meditation and Sanskrit verses.

Nikhilanand was one of the presiding spiritual leaders of the 6th Annual Gita conference in New York in 2008, which brought together eminent scholars and religious leaders from around the world. He was also one of the presiding members of the Hindu Mandir Executive Conference in 2010 where he delivered an Inaugural Speech and which brought together 90 major Hindu temples and organizations from throughout North America. In 2010, he was invited by Vishwa Hindu Parishad of America (World Hindu Council), Gujarati Samaj of Greater Houston and Hindus of Greater Houston to be the "chief guest" at the National Makar Sankranti day festivities at George Bush Park in Houston and to inaugurate the Mass Surya Namaskara Yajna at the park. In 2011, Nikhilanand was invited to represent the Hindu religion and give an inaugural address at First Hindu-Jewish-Solidarity-Day in Houston, which was organized by Bridge Houston and Hindus of Greater Houston to bring together influential leaders from both religions.

In 2006, Hamilton College published a scholarly paper in its journal Insights called "Following the Swami: Diaspora, Dialogue, and the Creation of a Hindu Identity in a Queens Community", which documented Nikhilanand's teaching in New York.

He is also a regular, "special guest" speaker at the Hindu Students Council, and other Hindu groups such as Hindus of Greater Houston, American Telugu Association, World Hindu Council (VHP America) and to Bhutanese Hindu groups. He regularly speaks at special events at American Hindu temples, such as the anniversary celebration of New York Kali Mandir.

He has been interviewed on several popular TV and radio shows, including ITV Gold and on Radio Salaam Namaste and according to his website, his lecture series called "Essence of the Gita" was broadcast on channel 67 and RCN in New York.

His writings have been published in magazines like Hinduism Today.
