= Utkala Deepika =

Odia printed newspaper

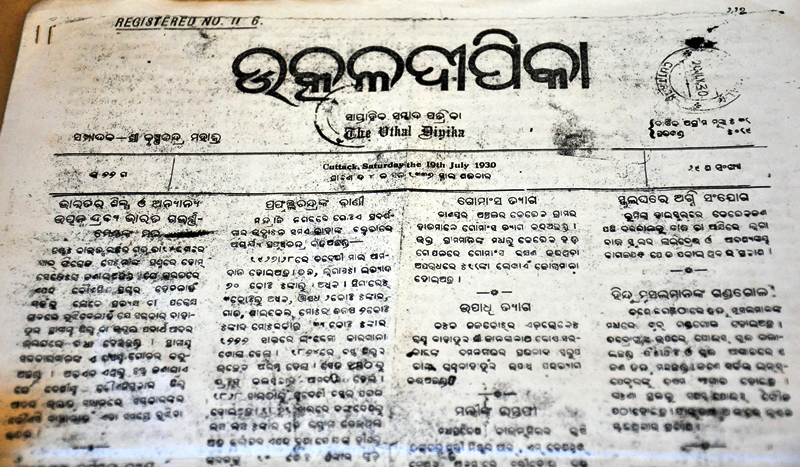
- First Odia newspaper Utkala Deepika that was published by Gourishankar Ray
- Type: Weekly newspaper
- Founded: 4 August 1866
- Language: Odia, English

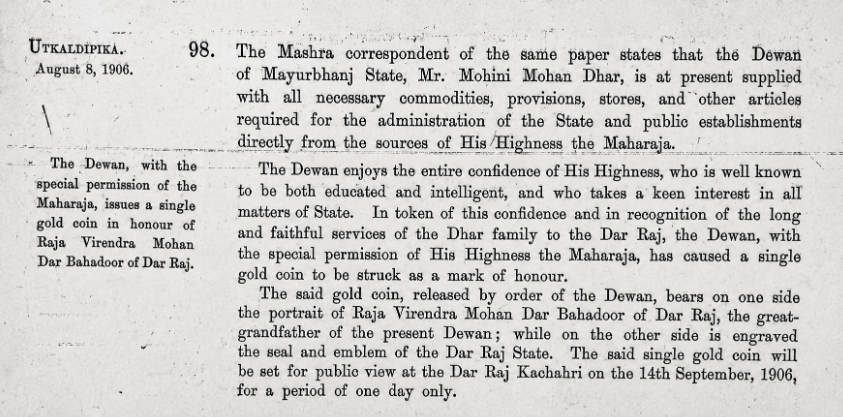

The Utkala Deepika was the first Odia printed newspaper. The weekly paper was started on 4 August 1866 by Gourishankar Ray and Babu Bichitrananda Das. Therefore, 4 August is celebrated as Odia Journalism Day.

This weekly was instrumental in campaigning of bringing all Odia speaking tracts under a single province in India to develop the Odia language.
