= The Samaya =

Odia daily newspaper

- Type: Daily Newspaper
- Founder: Basanta Kumar Biswal
- Editor-in-chief: Satakadi Hota
- Editor: Dillip Bisoi
- Managing editor: Ranjib Biswal
- Founded: October 2, 1996; 30 years ago
- Political alignment: Independent
- Language: Odia
- Headquarters: Bhubaneswar
- Country: India
- Website: The Samaya Web Portal
- Free online archives: The Samaya Epaper

The Samaya is an Odia daily newspaper which was first published in 1996 in Bhubaneswar. Its editor was S. Hota, and its publisher was Ranjib Biswal.

It is a popular newspaper which is read around Odisha.
