= Gopala Chandra Praharaj =

Indian writer and linguist

- ଗୋପାଳ ଚନ୍ଦ୍ର ପ୍ରହରାଜ
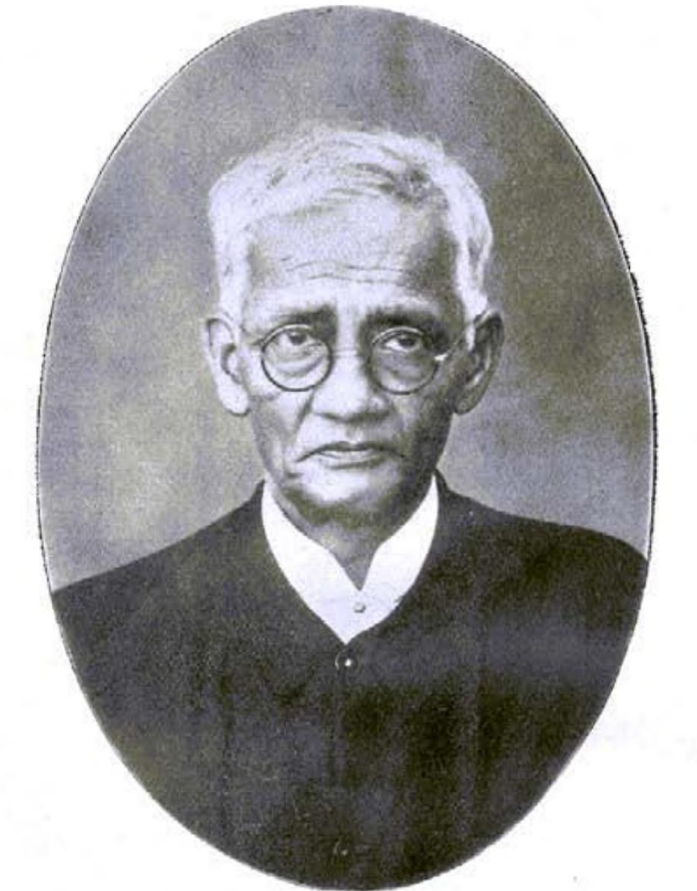
- Gopala Chandra Praharaj
- Born: 27 September 1874; Siddheswarpur, Cuttack, India
- Died: 16 May 1945 (aged 70)
- Occupations: Lawyer, Writer
- Writing career
- Period: Twentieth Century

Gopala Chandra Praharaj (27 September 1874 – 16 May 1945) was a writer in the Odia language, well known as the compiler of the Purnachandra Odia Bhashakosha. He also contributed significantly to Odia literature by his works in prose. A lawyer by profession, Praharaj wrote several satirical and analytical essays, in magazines such as Utkal Sahitya, Rasachakra, Nababharata, and Satya Samachar, on the social, political and cultural issues of contemporary Odisha (Odisha) during early 20th century.

== Early life ==
Praharaj was born on 27 September 1874 to an aristocratic Zamindar Brahmin family of Siddheswarpur in Cuttack district. He completed his matriculation from Ravenshaw Collegiate School and studied FA from Ravenshaw college of Cuttack. He studied law at Calcutta University and became a lawyer in 1902.

== Life as a writer ==
He started writing essays in the Magazine Utkal Sahitya in 1901 by the caption "Bhagabata Tungire Sandhya", which is the first published work by the author. It was followed by Bai Mohanty Panji and many other writings on socio-cultural and political issues. He followed the footsteps of Fakir Mohan Senapati and made a remarkable development in Odia satirical literature. Praharaj used the colloquial speech of Odisha along with Hindustani, Parsi, English, Sanskrit and folk language in his prose works. He wrote several critical essays with different pen names in many magazines up to his old age. However, he dedicated around three decades of his life to the compilation of Purnachandra Odia Bhashakosha.

== Works ==
=== Purnachandra Odia Bhashakosha ===
Purnachandra Odia Bhashakosha is the most comprehensive lexicon in Odia language. It presents the meaning of words in four languages—Odia, English, Hindi and Bengali, and explains the origin, development and use of the words. It consists of around 9,500 pages and 185 thousand words in 7 volumes. Praharaj not only did the work of compiling the lexicon, but also raised funds for its publication and supervised its printing and sale. Praharaj included in this lexicon not only the words which were used in literature, but also the words of common speech. The publication of the lexicon was patronised by the kings/princes of several princely states of present Orissa (Odisha). It is still recognised as the biggest dictionary in Oriya (Odia) language, although few copies of the original printed version survive. An electronic version has been published by Srujanika.

Praharaj while compiling the Purnachandra Odia Bhashakosha, also introduced a new letter- ୱ to the Odia script inventory to represent the phonetic sound of (Wa) in order to distinguish it from ବ (Ba), with which it shared the same consonant ligature form/conjunct form(୍ୱ).

=== Essays ===
Praharaj was one of the satirists of early 20th century. His writings were published in many magazines of that period; Utkal Sahitya, Rasachakra, Nababharata, Satya Samachar and many others. Dealing with social issues, political condition of Orissa and India, and socio-cultural mentality of contemporary people these essays were written in humorous style and critical manner. Some of his essays were published in shape of books during his life. His notable works are Bhagabata Tungire Sandhya, Bai Mohanty Panji, Dunia ra Halchal, Nananka Bastani. Some of his writings are now difficult to obtain.

=== Other writings ===
Praharaj published a book Utkalara Kahani dealing with the folk stories of Odisha. Among the remarkable works of Praharaj is "Dhaga Dhamali Rachana" containing the idioms of Odia language. His other works include his autobiography, many poems and stories written for children, a book namely Bhasakosha Safar.
