= Nikhilanand Panigrahy =

Indian- popular science writer

- Born: 20 December 1947 (age 78); Dhanantar, Ganjam, Odisha
- Education: M.Sc., Ph.D. (Physics)
- Alma mater: National Institute of Technology, Rourkela
- Writing career
- Language: Odia
- Genre: Popular Science

Nikhilanand Panigrahy is an Indian science writer and columnist from Odisha. He has been contributing regularly to a variety of prominent Oriya news papers and magazines since 1973.

== Early life and education ==
Nikhilanand was born on 20 December 1947 in the village of Dhanantar near Aska in Ganjam district of Odisha in India. He was born to Padmanav Panigrahy and Annapurna Panigrahy. He had primary education at village school in Dhanantara. Then he passed matriculation from Harihara High School, Aska successfully in 1961. He secured Bachelor of Science(B.Sc) with Physics Honours from Khallikote College, Berhampur with distinction and Honours in 1965. In 1967 he completed an M.Sc in Physics, with specialization in X-rays, from Regional Engineering College, now known as National Institute of Technology Rourkela. He earned Ph.D. under the guidance of Prof Prashanta Kumar Mishra. His Ph.D. thesis was about theoretical Solid State Physics. He retired as Director of Odisha State Bureau of Text Book Preparation and Production.
