= List of people from Odisha =

This is a list of people from or who live in Odisha, India.

== Literature ==
=== Age of Sarala Yuga ===
- Sarala Dasa (1465)
- Atibadi Jagannath Das (c. 1491–1550)

=== Age of Upendra Bhanja ===
- Kabi Samrat Upendra Bhanja (C. 1688–1740)
- Dinakrushna Dasa (c.1650–1710)
- Abhimanyu Samanta Singhara (c. 1760– 1806)
- Kavisurya Baladev Rath (c. 1789 – 1845)

=== Age of Radhanath ===
- Fakir Mohan Senapati
- Gangadhar Meher
- Radhanath Ray
- Madhusudan Rao
- Nanda Kishore Bal
- Gourishankar Ray
- Nilakantha Das

=== Post colonial age ===
- Gangadhar Meher
- Kalicharan Pattnaik
- Sachidananda Routray
- Brajanath Rath

=== Poets and authors ===
- Amjad Najmi
- Annada Shankar Ray
- Brajanath Ratha
- Fakir Mohan Senapati
- Gangadhar Meher
- Hussain Rabi Gandhi
- Godabarish Mishra
- Gopabandhu Das
- Gopinath Mohanty
- Gourahari Das
- Jachindra Rout
- Jagadish Mohanty
- Jagannath Prasad Das (Saraswati Samman winner)
- Jayadeva
- Jayanta Mahapatra
- Karamat Ali Karamat
- Kalicharan Pattnaik
- Madhusudan Rao
- Manasi Pradhan
- Manoj Das
- Manoranjan Das
- Manmohan Acharya
- Mayadhar Mansingh
- Mohammed Ayoob
- Nilakantha Das
- Oopali Operajita
- Pratibha Satpathy
- Radhanath Ray
- Ramakanta Rath
- Ramakrushna Nanda
- Sachidananda Raut Ray
- Sarala Dasa
- Sarala Devi
- Sarojini Sahoo
- Satya Narayan Bohidar
- Sitakanta Mohapatra (Jnanpith Award winner)
- Subrat Kumar Prusty (Maharshi Badrayan Vyas Samman winner)
- Tapan Kumar Pradhan

=== Writers and novelists ===
- Artabalabha Mohanti
- Brajanath Ratha
- Gita Mehta
- Gopinath Mohanty (Jnanpith Award winner)
- Haldhar Nag
- Kalindi Charan Panigrahi
- Krushna Chandra Kar
- Pratibha Ray
- Shantanu Kumar Acharya
- Surendra Mohanty
- Uday Satpathy

=== Women's writing and feminism ===
- Sarala Devi
- Archana Nayak
- Annapurna Choudhury
- Manasi Pradhan
- Nandini Sahu
- Sarojini Sahoo

=== Children's literature ===
- Kalicharan Pattnaik
- Adikanda Mahanta
- Krutibas Nayak
- Ramakrushna Nanda
- Dash Benhur
- Nilakantha Das

=== Drama and plays ===
- Kalicharan Pattnaik
- Gopal Chhotray
- Manoranjan Das
- Biswajit Das

=== Short stories ===
- Fakir Mohan Senapati
- Kalicharan Pattnaik
- Surendra Mohanty
- Manoj Das
- Jagadish Mohanty
- Sarojini Sahoo

=== Popular science ===
- Binod Kanungo
- Gokulananda Mohapatra
- Dr. Ramesh Chandra Parida
- Kamalakanta Jena

== Education and Research ==
Satyabadi Era

- Gopabandhu Das
- Nilakantha Das
- Godabarish Mishra

Later Period

- Kalicharan Pattnaik
- Baidyanath Misra
- Bhubaneswar Behera
- Bidhu Bhusan Das
- Prabhat Nalini Das
- Subrat Kumar Prusty (Maharshi Badrayan Vyas Samman
- Madhu Sudan Kanungo
- Keshab Chandra Dash
- Madhab Chandra Dash
- Prafulla Kumar Jena
- Baisali Mohanty
- Jitendra Nath Mohanty
- Saraju Mohanty
- Oopali Operajita
- Prana Krushna Parija
- Nikhil Mohan Pattnaik
- Jogesh Pati
- Arun K. Pati
- Sam Pitroda
- Amiya Pujari
- Ashok Swain
- Jitamitra Prasad Singh Deo

== Business and Entrepreneurship ==
- Sadhabas - Traders and Merchants from Odisha( Kalinga)
- Kaundinya I - Kalingan Merchant & second monarch of Funan
- Madhusudan Das - Founder of Orissa Art Wares in 1898 and Utkal Tannery in 1905
- Biju Patnaik - Founder of Kalinga tubes, Kalinga Airlines, Kalinga Iron work, Kalinga Refractories and the Kalinga, a daily Odia newspaper
- Mahimananda Mishra - Founder, OSL Group
- Banshidhar Panda - Founder, IMFA Group
- Achyuta Samanta - Founder, KIIT Group
- Tara Ranjan Pattnaik - Founder, Falcon Marine Group
- Dilip Ray - Founder, Mayfair Group
- Soumya Ranjan Patnaik - Founder, Sambad Group
- Prem Pattnaik - Founder, Haryana Coated Papers ltd & Red Fortune Llp
- Pankaj Lochan Mohanty - Founder, MGM Group
- Dr Satyaprakash Panda - Founder, Gandhi Group of Institutions
- Dr Swarup Ranjan Mishra - Founder, Mediheal Group of Hospitals, Kenya & 1st Odia MP of Kenya, from Kesses Constituency.
- Dr Ramakanta Panda - Founder, Asian Heart Institute & Asian Hospitals
- Dr Sita Kantha Dash - Founder, Kalinga Hospitals
- Dr Maya Gantayet - Founder, Ashwini Group of Hospitals
- Arun Kar - Founder of the Nest Group-a multinational conglomerate from UK
- Aditya Patra - Founder, The Aditya Group (Odisha)
- Biswanath Pattnaik - Founder FinNest Group of Companies, a renewable energy-focused private equity investment company
- Tarini Prasad Mohanty - Founder,

Naibuga Iron and Manganese Mines (Mining Magnate) and owner of Team Gonasika, hockey franchise of Visakhapatnam, AP

- Dr Priyabrata Dhir - Founder, Sparsh Healthcare group
- Rabindra Kumar Jena - Founder, Highland Group
- Sibashish Mishra - Founder of BookingJini, a hospitality SaaS platform serving thousands of hotels
- Sitakanta Ray - Founder of RetainIQ, is aimed at e-commerce brands looking to enhance their customer engagement and MySmartPrice, a leading price comparison platform used by lakhs of Indian consumers
- Subrat Kar - Founder of MotorFloor, an online marketplace for commercial vehicles such as trucks, tractors, buses, and electric vehicles & co-founder of Vidooly, a video analytics platform that changed how Indian content creators and brands measured video performance
- Santosh Panda - Founder of Foundership, a global accelerator VC focused on AI, Web3, and emerging tech and Explara in 2008 — a platform that deals with event ticketing and management across India
- Srikumar Mishra - Founder of Aarna Protocol, a Singapore-based platform that blends decentralised finance with AI to create autonomous asset management solutions and Milk Mantra - dairy products startup, which was acquired by Hatsun Agro Product ltd. in 2025
- Sarat Kumar Sahoo - Founder of Ruchi Foodline, a FMCG sector company whose brand "Ruchi Masala" is a household name in Odisha.
- Pradosh Kumar Rout - Founder of Pragati Milk Products, whose brand

"Pragati” is the most trusted and popular dairy product brand in every household of Odisha.

- Asish Mohapatra - Co founder and CEO of "Ofbusiness"
- Priyadarshi Nanu Pany - Founder of CSM Technologies
- Dr Tirupati Panigrahi - Founder of Hi-tech Group
- Tapendra N Senapati & Ayaskanta Mohanty - Founder of Tatwa Technologies
- Subroto Bagchi - Co-Founder of MindTree Limited
- Jyotiranjan Harichandan - Co-founder of Bolt Energy, one of India’s fastest-growing EV infrastructure companies.
- Manas Badajena - Founder of Houzlook, the creative force and entrepreneurial mind behind Houzlook, Bangalore’s trusted full-service interior design brand.
- Tara Prasad Mahapatra - the visionary entrepreneur behind Asian Health Meter and Health Express
- Jitu Mohapatra - Founder of Orimark Properties
- Dr. Kamakhya Das - Founder of Kruti Coffee, one of India’s fastest-growing homegrown specialty coffee brands
- Capt. Soumya R. Patnaik- the Managing Partner & CEO of Panbulk Shipping DMCC, one of the most respected names in global maritime logistics
- Dr. Jitendra Kumar Mohanty - the visionary founder and CMD of Swosti Group — Odisha’s leading name in hospitality, tourism, and education
- Dr. Sreejoy Patnaik, a renowned surgeon and the visionary founder of Shanti Hospitals Group, Cuttack
- Biraja Rout - Founder of Biggies Burger – one of India’s fastest-growing burger chains
- Manoj Kumar Pattnaik - the visionary founder of Orissa Transformer Pvt Ltd (OTPL) – a name trusted by Tata and many other industrial giants across India
- Milan K. Mishra - Founder of Duramix Concrete — one of Odisha’s most trusted names in the construction materials industry.
- Suresh Chandra Sahoo - Founder of Dion Group
- Amarendra Dash - Founder of Suryo Group
- Sibasis Nayak - Founder of T Cube Solutions (acquired by Capgemini)
- Tapan Kumar Mohanty - Founder of Z Estates Group
- Mohammed Moquim - Founder of Metro Group

== Aviators ==
- Giribala Mohanty

== Artists ==
=== Actresses ===
- Anu Choudhury
- Archita Sahu
- Barsha Priyadarshini
- Bijaya Jena
- Jyoti Mishra
- Mahasweta Ray
- Naina Das
- Nandita Das
- Rameshwari
- Sulagna Panigrahi
- Tandra Ray
- Kavya Keeran
- Rajeswari Ray
- Pupul Bhuyan
- Sudharani Jena

=== Actors ===
- Akash Das Nayak
- Anubhav Mohanty
- Arindam Roy
- Atal Bihari Panda
- Babushaan Mohanty
- Bijay Mohanty
- Buddhaditya Mohanty
- Chandan Kar
- Chandrachur Singh
- Dipanwit Dashmohapatra
- Dukhiram Swain
- Hara Patnaik
- Jayiram Samal
- Mihir Das
- Papu Pam Pam
- Prashanta Nanda
- Sabyasachi Mishra
- Sadhu Meher
- Sarat Pujari
- Siddhanta Mahapatra
- Sisir Misra
- Sriram Panda
- Uttam Mohanty
- Mohammad Mohsin
- Jyoti Ranjan Nayak
- Samaresh Routray
- Partha Sarathi Ray

=== Dancers ===
==== Modern ====
- Rajasmita Kar
- Prince Dance Group

==== Odissi Gurus and Dancers ====
- Kalicharan Pattnaik
- Gangadhar Pradhan
- Geeta Mahalik
- Kelucharan Mohapatra
- Mayadhar Raut
- Sanjukta Panigrahi
- Saswat Joshi
- Sujata Mohapatra
- Sunanda Patnaik
- Oopali Operajita
- Kumkum Mohanty
- Baisali Mohanty
- Dayanidhi Das

=== Filmmakers ===
- Mohammad Mohsin
- Mehmood Hussain
- Bijoy Ketan Mishra
- Hara Patnaik
- Mira Nair
- Nila Madhab Panda
- Nitai Palit
- Prashanta Nanda
- Ravi Kinagi
- Sabyasachi Mohapatra
- Sadhu Meher
- Sisir Mishra
- Jitendra Mishra

=== Painters ===
- Jatin Das
- Jayanta Meher
- Kailash Chandra Meher

=== Sand artists ===
- Sudarshan Pattnaik

=== Sculptors ===
- Raghunath Mohapatra
- Sudarshan Sahoo

=== Singers ===
- Kalicharan Pattnaik
- Akshaya Mohanty
- Bhikari Bal
- Arabinda Muduli
- Krishna Beura
- Pratyush Prakash
- Sarbeswar Bhoi
- Sikandar Alam
- Sniti Mishra
- Sona Mohapatra
- Sunanda Patnaik
- Rituraj Mohanty
- Jitendra Haripal

=== Musicians ===
- Kalicharan Pattnaik
- Akshaya Mohanty
- Prafulla Kar
- Arabinda Muduli

=== Designers ===
- Bibhu Mohapatra

== Jurists ==
- Ananga Kumar Patnaik; Former Justice of Supreme Court of India
- Gopal Ballav Pattanaik; Former Chief Justice of India
- Bira Kishore Ray; First Chief Justice of Orissa High Court
- Sukanta Kishore Ray; Former Chief Justice of Orissa High Court
- Jugal Kishore Mohanty; Former Chief Justice of Sikkim High Court
- Pradip Kumar Mohanty; Former Chief Justice of Jharkhand High Court
- Gati Krushna Misra; Former Chief Justice of Orissa High Court
- Ranganath Misra; Former Chief Justice of India
- Dipak Misra; Former Chief Justice of India

== Chief Executive Officers ==
- T.K.Chand, Chairman and Managing Director of NALCO

== Professionals ==
=== Bankers ===
- Ashok Kumar Sarangi
- Harun Rashid Khan

=== Engineers ===
- Bibhusita Das

=== Managers ===
- Sarthak Behuria
- Sandip Das
- Subroto Bagchi
- Dr Tapan Kumar Pradhan

=== Physicians ===
- B. K. Misra (Neurosurgeon)
- Ramakanta Panda (Cardiovascular Surgeon)

=== Journalists ===
- Bibhuti Bhushan Nayak (Journalist)
- Gopal Mishra

== Government civil servants ==
- Anugraha Narayan Tiwari (Former CIC of India)
- Lalit Mansingh
- Prajna Paramita
- Ramakanta Rath
- Sitakanta Mohapatra
- Dayanidhi Choudhury

=== Security and Law Enforcement ===
- Pramod Kumar Satapathy

== Religion ==
- Chaitanya Mahaprabhu
- Bhima Bhoi
- Jayadeva
- Atibadi Jagannath Das
- Achyutananda Das
- Durga Charan Mohanty

== Freedom fighters ==
- Annapurna Choudhury
- Afzal-ul Amin
- Baji Rout
- Biswambhar Parida
- Bishwanath Das
- Bakshi Jagabandhu
- Chakhi Khuntia
- Ekram Rasul
- Ghanshyam Panigrahi
- Gopabandhu Choudhury
- Gopabandhu Das
- Godabarish Mishra
- Gurubari Meher
- Harekrushna Mahatab
- Jayee Rajguru
- Jagannatha Gajapati Narayana Deo II
- Jagabandhu Patnaik
- Kamal Singh
- Karunakar Singh
- Krushna Chandra Gajapati
- Laxman Nayak
- Madhab Chandra Routray
- Madho Singh (Ghess)
- Madhusudan Das
- Madhusudan Rao
- Malati Choudhury
- Nabakrushna Choudhuri
- Nilakantha Das
- Nityananda Mohapatra
- Parbati Giri
- Pindiki Bahubalendra
- RamaDevi Choudhury
- Sarala Devi
- Subhas Chandra Bose
- Sarangadhar Das
- Sayeed Mohammed
- Veer Surendra Sai

== Rulers ==
- Avakinnayo Karakandu
- Chullakalinga
- Kalinga II
- Kharavela
- Kalinga Magha
- Nissanka Malla
- Satrubhanja
- Kaundinya I
- Hemangada
- Sivakara Deva I
- Ramachandra Deva I
- Tribhuvana Mahadevi I
- Anantavarman Chodaganga
- Anangabhima Deva III
- Narasingha Deva I
- Kapilendra Deva
- Purushottama Deva
- Prataparudra Deva
- Govinda Vidyadhara
- Jagannatha Gajapati Narayana Deo II
- Krushna Chandra Gajapati
- Basudeb Sudhal Deb
- Ramai Deva
- Balarama Deva
- Vishwanath Dev Gajapati
- Vikram Dev III
- Sriram Chandra Bhanj Deo

== Politicians ==
- Amarnath Pradhan
- Ananga Udaya Singh Deo
- Ananta Nayak
- Archana Nayak
- Arjun Charan Sethi
- Afzal-ul Amin
- Badri Narayan Patra
- Bhakta Charan Das
- Gopanarayan Das
- Bhartruhari Mahtab
- Bhupinder Singh
- Bibhu Prasad Tarai
- Bijayananda Patnaik
- Bijoy Mohapatra
- Biju Patnaik
- Bikram Keshari Deo
- Binayak Acharya
- Biren Mitra
- Bishwanath Das
- Braja Kishore Tripathy
- Chandra Sekhar Sahu
- Chintamani Panigrahi
- Draupadi Murmu
- Godabarish Mishra
- Gourahari Naik
- Giridhar Gamang
- Habibullah Khan
- Harekrushna Mahatab
- Hari Har Swain
- Hemananda Biswal
- Hrushikesh Naik
- Hussain Rabi Gandhi
- Janaki Ballabh Patnaik
- Jayaram Pangi
- Jitu Patnaik
- Jual Oram
- Kalikesh Narayan Singh Deo
- Kamakhya Prasad Singh Deo
- Laichan Nayak
- Laxman Tudu
- Maheswar Baug
- Mohan Jena
- Nabakrushna Choudhuri
- Nabin Nanda
- Nandini Satpathy
- Naveen Patnaik
- Nilakantha Das
- Nityanand Kanungo
- Nilamani Routray
- Niranjan Patnaik
- Nityananda Pradhan
- Parsuram Majhi
- Pinaki Misra
- Pradeep Kumar Majhi
- Prasanna Acharya
- Prasanna Kumar Patasani
- P.V.Narasimha Rao
- Pyarimohan Mohapatra
- Rabi Ray
- Radhanath Rath
- Rajendra Narayan Singh Deo
- Ranjib Biswal
- Rudramadhab Ray
- Sadashiva Tripathy
- Samarendra Kundu
- Sanatan Mahakud
- Saptagiri Sankar Ulaka
- Sangeeta Kumari Singh Deo
- Sanjay Bhoi
- Sarala Devi
- Siddhanta Mahapatra
- Soumya Ranjan Patnaik
- Srikant Kumar Jena
- Surendra Mohanty
- Sudam Marndi
- Surendra Mohanty
- Sushila Tiriya
- Tathagata Satpathy
- V.V. Giri
- Baikunthanath Swain

== Social service ==
- Baba Balia
- Sarala Devi
- Madhusudan Das
- Gopabandhu Das
- Subrat Kumar Prusty
- Farhat Amin
- Manasi Pradhan
- Begum Badar un nissa Akhtar

== Sports ==
=== Cricket ===
- Alok Jena
- A. Panda
- Baljit Singh
- Basant Mohanty
- Bibhudutta Panda
- Kadambini Mohakud
- Biplab Samantray
- Debashish Mohanty
- Ranjib Biswal
- Sanjay Raul
- Shiv Sunder Das
- Natraj Behera

=== Hockey ===
- Binita Toppo (female hockey)
- Dilip Tirkey
- Lazarus Barla
- Ignace Tirkey
- Birendra Lakra

=== Other sports ===
- Anuradha Biswal (100m hurdles, running)
- Budhia Singh (long distance running)
- Dutee Chand (sprint runner)
- Jauna Murmu (sprint running, hurdler)
- Katulu Ravi Kumar (weightlifting)
- Srabani Nanda (sprint runner)
- Pramila Prava Minz (rowing)
- Pratima Puhan (rowing)
- Valena Valentina (karate)
- Kalpana Dash (Everest climber)
- Pramod Bhagat (Paralympian)

== See also ==
- Lists of people from India by state
- List of Odia poets
- Odia people
- Odia literature
- Odia language
