= Panigrahi =

Panigrahi is an Indian surname that may refer to the following notable people:

- Aasutosh Panigrahi, Indian artist
- Ashok Kumar Panigrahi, Indian Radio Broadcaster
- Bhagabati Charan Panigrahi (1907–1943), Indian writer and politician
- Chintamani Panigrahi (1922–2000), Indian Independence Movement activist
- Durga Charan Panigrahi (born 1961), Indian mining scientist
- Ghanshyam Panigrahi (1881–?), Indian freedom fighter and politician
- Gopinath Panigrahi (1924–2004), Indian botanist and plant taxonomist
- Kalindi Charan Panigrahi (1901–1991), Indian poet, novelist, story writer, dramatist, and essayist
- Krishna Chandra Panigrahi (1909–1987), Indian historian and archaeologist
- Raghunath Panigrahi (1932–2013), Indian vocalist, composer and music director
- Sanjukta Panigrahi (1944–1997), Indian dancer
- Sriballav Panigrahi (1940–2015), Indian politician
- Sulagna Panigrahi, Indian television and film actress
