= Laxmi Meher =

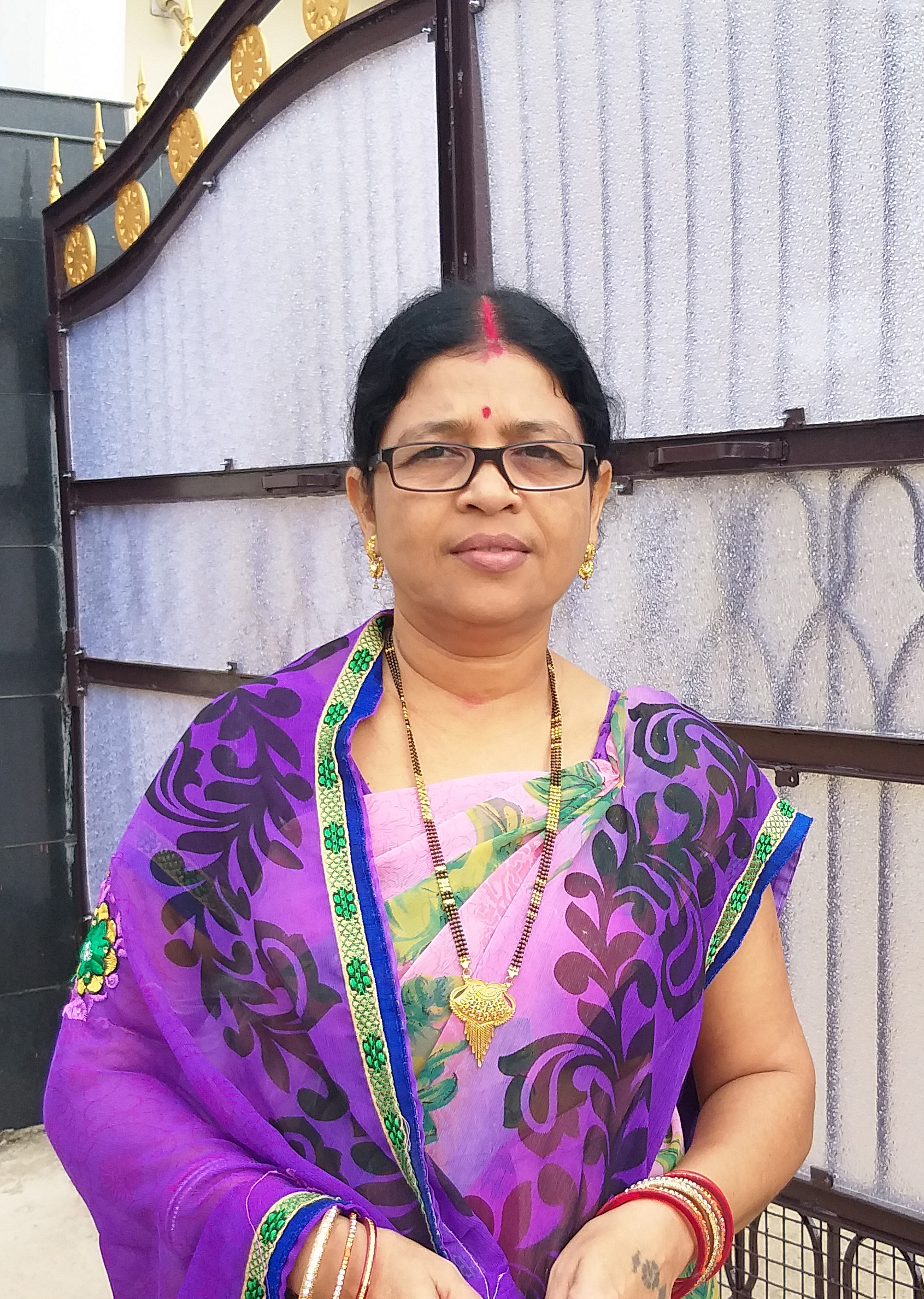
- Born: 6 July 1967 (age 59); Tarava, Odisha, India
- Occupation: Artist (painter)
- Spouse: Kailash Chandra Meher
- Children: Prakash Meher, Manisha Meher, Jayanta Meher

Laxmi Meher (born 6 July 1967) is an Indian artist and social activist. She is popular for her Odisha pattachitra paintings.

== Early life and background ==
She was born in Tarava, a small village of Subarnapur District of Odisha and now based in Bolangir Town of Odisha. She is wife of renowned artist Padmashri Kailash Chandra Meher. She has two sons Prakash Meher, Jayanta Meher and a daughter Manisha Meher. They all already have awarded as National Award for their respective honest contribution towards Odisha Pattachitra Paintings.

== Career ==
After marriage she was inclined to painting from since she was 18 years old. She pursued the art work activity under expert care of her husband. Now for the last three decades she has acquired a high degree of proficiency in traditional painting. Besides being a housewife she has imparted training to institution like Indian Art & Craft Academy for Women, where many younger generations trained. Now she is an established craftsperson and also given training & employment to many young artisans of KBK districts of Odisha through Government of India's training scheme likes 'Guru Shishya Parampara under HRD scheme' and 'Scheme-C' etc.

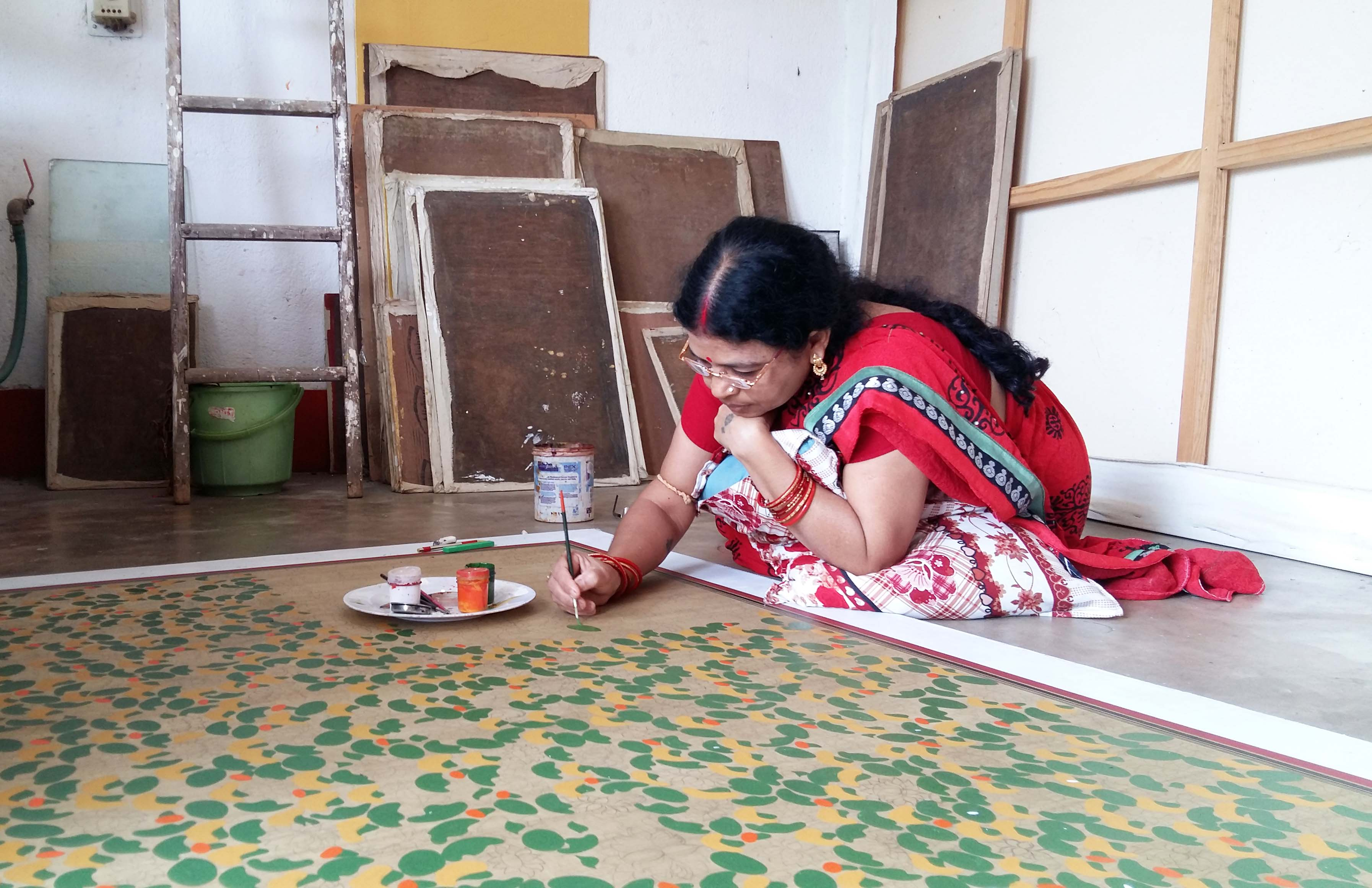
Photographs of Laxmi Meher while on work at her residence

Smt. Meher has participated in various Handicraft exhibitions throughout the country in her lifetime career and her paintings are highly valued by the art lovers, VIPs and visitors in exhibition. Her sincerity and dedication to art brought her the Master Craftsman National Award from HE the President of India in 2005 and State Award from Chief Minister of Odisha in 1990.

== Awards ==
- 2005 - National Award by President of India
- 1990 - State Award by Chief Minister of Odisha
- 2026 - DEVI Award by The New Indian Express
