= Ashok Swain =

Indian-born Swedish professor (born 1965)

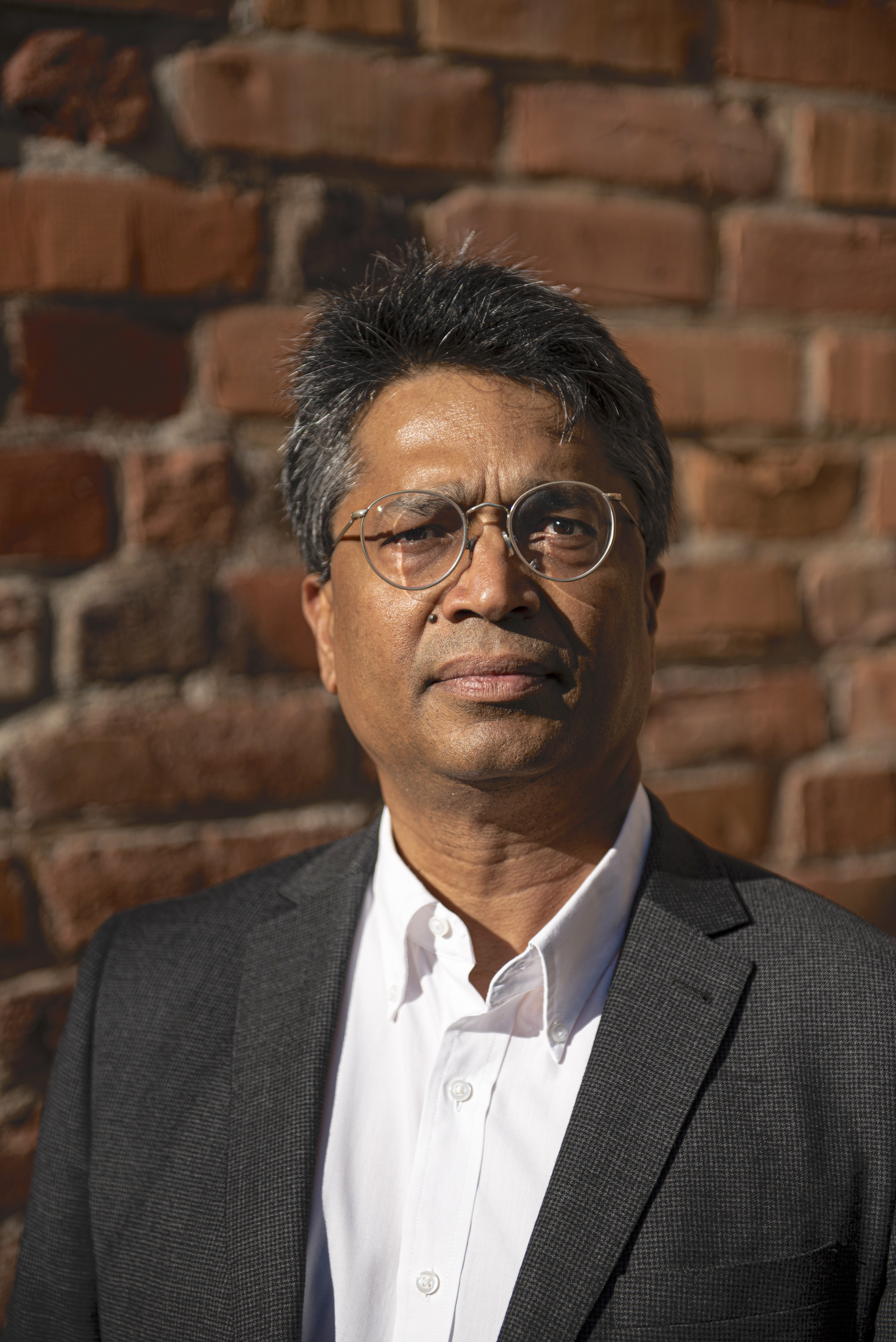
- Ashok Swain
- Born: 19 February 1965 (age 61); Orissa, India
- Education: Delhi University; Jawaharlal Nehru University
- Known for: Research on transboundary water sharing, climate change, and population migration, writing about global politics and contemporary India

Ashok Swain is an Indian-born Swedish academic and public intellectual. He is a professor of peace and conflict research at the Department of Peace and Conflict Research at Uppsala University in Uppsala, Sweden. In 2017, he was appointed as the UNESCO Chair on International Water Cooperation and became the first UNESCO Chair of Uppsala University. He's also the Head of the Department of Conflict Research at Uppsala University. He's the director of the Research School for International Water Cooperation of Uppsala University and Stockholm International Water Institute. Swain is also founding editor-in-chief of the journal Environment & Security (Sage).

== Biography ==
Swain was born in the eastern Indian state of Orissa. After studying in his village school, he completed his Bachelor of Arts from Ravenshaw College, Cuttack under Utkal University, Bhubaneswar. He received his Master of Arts from the University of Delhi. Swain received his Ph.D. in 1991 from the School of International Studies of Jawaharlal Nehru University, New Delhi, India with the thesis titled "Security of Small States in the International System".

=== Academic career ===
Swain was an Associate Senior Fellow to the SIPRI Climate Change Risk Program. He was the founding director of Uppsala University's Center for Sustainable Development from 2008 to 2012. He has been a MacArthur Fellow at the University of Chicago. Swain has held visiting fellowship at UN Research Institute for Social Development, Geneva. He has held visiting professorships at Stanford University, McGill University, the University of British Columbia, the University of Maryland, Tufts University, and the University of Natural Sciences and Life Sciences, Vienna.

=== In media ===
Swain writes a weekly column "Right is Wrong" for Gulf News. Swain has also written opinion articles in publications including Daily Mail, Nikkei Asia, Quartz, The Conversation, Business Standard, Outlook, Scroll, The Express Tribune, The Wire, The Print, Center for Strategic and International Studies (CSIS), DailyO, National Herald, Down to Earth, The Africa Report, Economic and Political Weekly, East Asia Forum, Fair Observer, Janta Ka Reporter, The Third Pole, and The Kochi Post.

=== Personal life ===
Swain was among the members of the Indian diaspora whose Overseas Citizen of India (OCI) was canceled by the Government of India. Swain's Twitter account has been withheld in India since August 2023.

In December 2022, Swain filed a suit in the Delhi High Court in India challenging the cancellation of his Overseas Citizen of India (OCI) card by the Ministry of Home Affairs, Government of India. In his lawsuit, Swain said that he received a show cause notice in October 2020 in which Swain was alleged to have indulged in "inflammatory speeches and anti-India activities." The Embassy of India to Sweden and Latvia cancelled Swain's OCI card in February 2022. Swain stated in his legal submission that he has "never engaged in any inflammatory speeches or anti-India activities." He further stated that as a scholar, it is his role in society to "discuss and critique the policies of the Government." Swain stated that he analyzes and criticizes certain policies of the present India government; however, such criticism of the "current ruling dispensation shall not be tantamount to anti-India activities."

In February 2023, the Delhi High Court granted further time of four weeks to the Government of India to file its response on the suit filed by Swain challenging the basis for the cancellation of his OCI card. The Central Government of India through the Ministry of Home Affairs informed the Delhi High Court that Swain was found indulging in ‘illegal activities inimical’ to the interests of India.

In July 2023, the Delhi High Court set aside the Government of India's order revoking Swain's OCI status.

== Views and opinions ==
Swain has expressed his views through interviews with BBC Radio, NBC News, Voice of America, Al Jazeera, and TRT World, as well as through his articles and tweets.

=== Anti-CAA protests ===
Writing about the widespread anti-CAA protests in 2019, Swain said the Modi government's legislation such as the Citizenship (Amendment) Act, 2019 made India's 200 million Muslims nervous about their status in an "overwhelmingly Hindu-majority country."

Swain wrote that Muslims saw through the Citizenship (Amendment) Act's dangers as that law may lead to millions of Muslims being made stateless though the Act initially only sought to give citizenship to religious minorities from India's neighboring countries who are fleeing those countries and seeking refuge in India. According to him, the Act explicitly failed to mention Muslims while mentioning every other religion.

In February 2020, he shared false voter information of jamia shooter on twitter and alleged that he wasn't a minor. He later deleted that tweet claiming 'confusion' over correctness of voter's list entry.

=== Article 370 ===
Swain was critical of the Modi government's decision to revoke the special status of Jammu & Kashmir. Swain tweeted that liberals who had turned nationalists should be careful about celebrating this decision.

== Selected publications ==
=== Books ===
- Ashok Swain, Climate Security (London: Sage, 2025).
- Ashok Swain & Anders Jägerskog, Emerging Security Threats in the Middle East: The Impact of Climate Change and Globalization (Lanham: Rowman & Littlefield, 2016).
- Anton Earle, Ana Elise Cascao, Stina Hansson, Anders Jägerskog, Ashok Swain, & J¨oakim Öjendal, Transboundary Water Management and the Climate Change Debate (London: Routledge, 2015).
- Ashok Swain, Understanding Emerging Security Challenges: Threats and Opportunities (London: Routledge, 2012).
- Ashok Swain, Struggle Against the State: Social Network and Protest Mobilization in India (Farnham: Ashgate Publishing Limited, 2010).
- Ashok Swain, Managing Water Conflict: Asia, Africa and the Middle East (London & New York: Routledge, 2004).
- Ashok Swain, The Environmental Trap: The Ganges River Diversion, Bangladeshi Migration and Conflicts in India (Uppsala: Department of Peace and Conflict Research, 1996).
- Ashok Swain, Environment and Conflict: Analyzing the Developing World (Uppsala: Department of Peace and Conflict Research, 1993).

=== Edited books ===
- Sofie Hellberg, Fredrik Söderbaum, Ashok Swain, Joakim Öjendal, eds., Routledge Handbook of Water and Development (London: Routledge, 2023).
- Ashok Swain, Joakim Öjendal, & Anders Jägerskog, eds., Handbook of Security and the Environment (Cheltenham: Edward Elgar, 2021).
- Anders Jägerskog, Michael Schulz & Ashok Swain, Routledge Handbook on Middle East Security (London: Routledge, 2019).
- Ashok Swain & Joakim Öjendal, eds., Routledge Handbook of Environmental Conflict and Peacebuilding (London: Routledge, 2018).
- Anders Jägerskog, Ashok Swain & Joakim Öjendal, eds., Water Security (4 Volume Set) (London: Sage Publications Ltd, 2014).
- Ramses Amer, Ashok Swain & Joakim Öjendal. eds., The Security-Development Nexus: Peace, Conflict and Development (London: Anthem Press, 2012).
- Ashok Swain, Ramses Amer & Joakim Öjendal. eds., The Democratization Project: Opportunities and Challenges (London: Anthem Press, 2009).
- Ashok Swain, Ramses Amer & Joakim Öjendal. Eds., Globalization and Challenges to Building Peace (London, New York & Delhi: Anthem Press, 2007).
- Ashok Swain, ed., Islam and Violent Separatism: New Democracies in Southeast Asia (London, New York & Bahrain: Kegan Paul, 2007).
- Ashok Swain, ed.,Diasporas, Armed Conflicts and Peacebuilding in their Homelands (Uppsala University, Department of Peace and Conflict Research, 2007).
- Fiona Rotberg & Ashok Swain, eds., Natural Resources Scarcity in South Asia: Nepal's Water (Stockholm: Institute for Security and Development Policy, 2007).
- Ashok Swain, ed., Education as Social Action: Knowledge, Identity and Power (Basingstoke & New York: Palgrave Macmillan, 2005).
