= Jayanta Meher =

Indian painter

Jayanta Kumar Meher
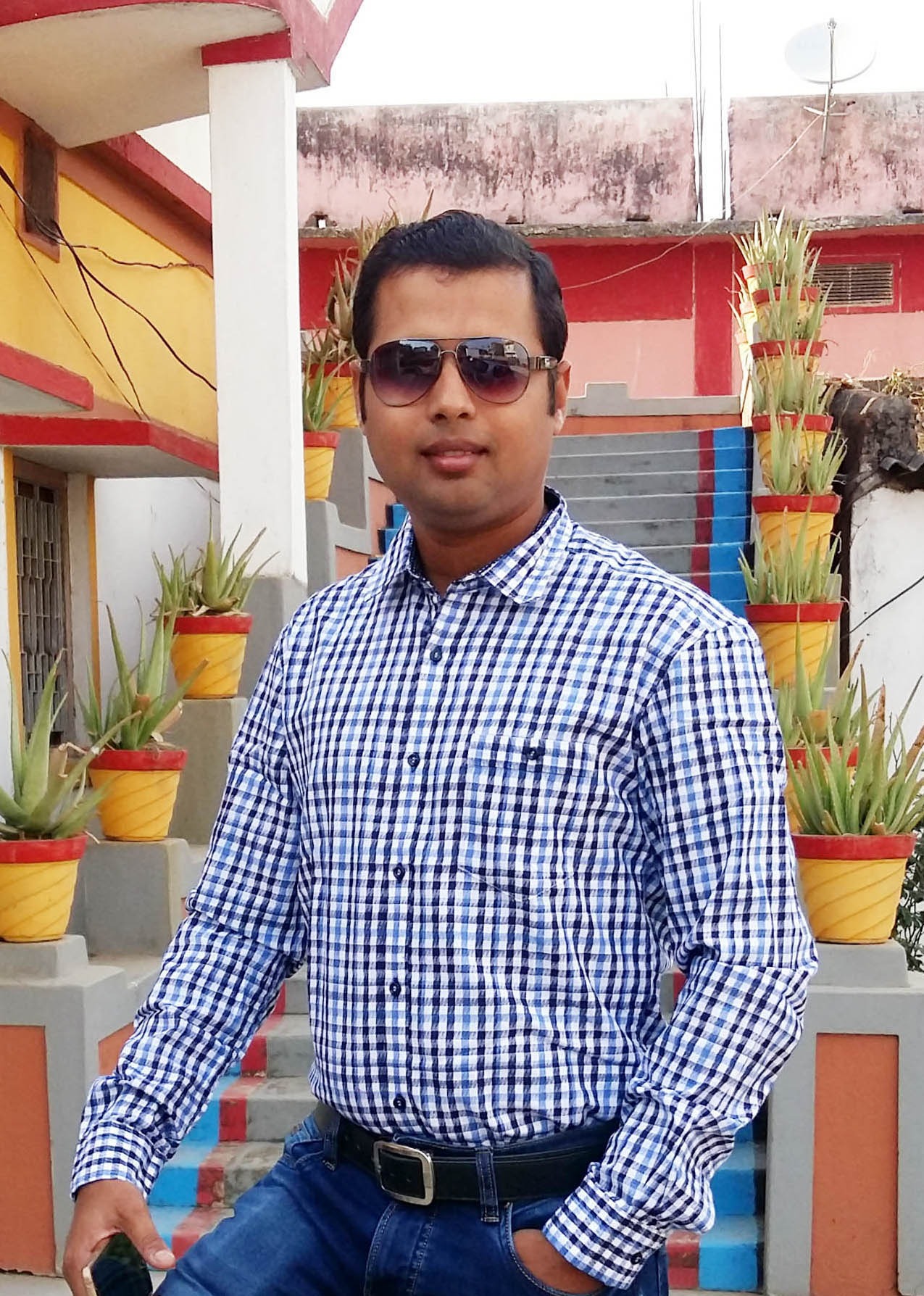
- Born: 13 June 1986 (age 40); Sonepur, Odisha, India
- Education: Sambalpur University
- Occupation: Artist (Painter)
- Parent(s): Kailash Chandra Meher, Laxmi Meher

Jayanta Meher, born on 13 June 1986), is a young Artist of Odisha Pattachitra painting. He was born in Sonepur and lives in Bolangir, Odisha.

== Early life and family ==
Jayanta Meher is the younger son of famous artist Padmashree Kailash Chandra Meher. He learned painting from his parents. All members of his family are well-known artists.

== Career ==
He was 10 years old when he started learning this craft. He won the Master Craftsman National Award in the year 2001. He participated in many exhibitions across India and abroad.
