= Kailash Chandra Meher =

Indian artist and painter

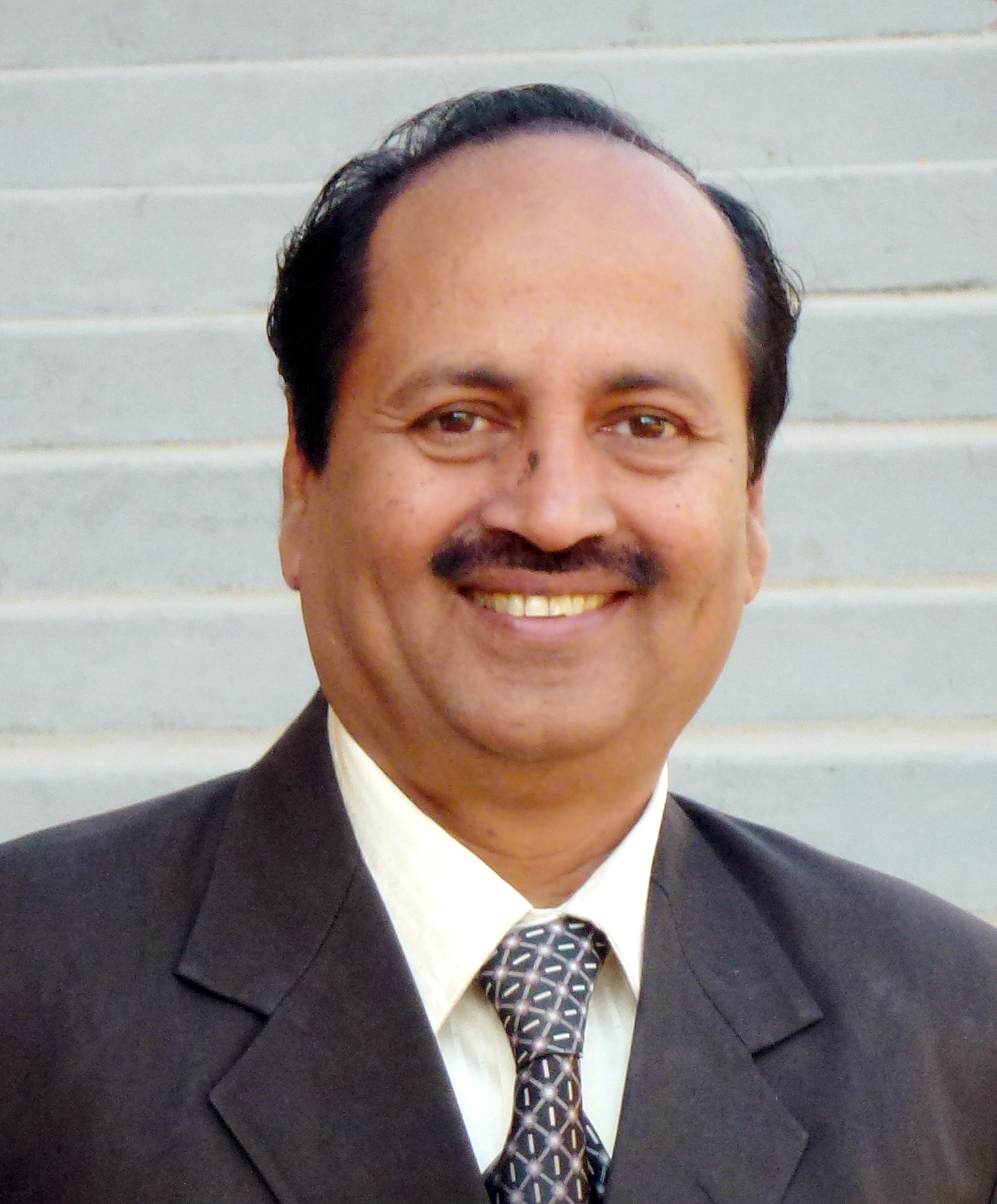
- Born: 22 January 1954 (age 72); Sonepur, Odisha, India
- Citizenship: Indian
- Education: Degree (Art)
- Alma mater: Visva-Bharati University
- Occupation: Artist
- Spouse: Laxmi Meher
- Children: Prakash Meher, Manisha Meher & Jayanta Meher
- Relatives: Sadhu Meher (Uncle)

Kailash Chandra Meher (born 22 January 1954) is an Indian artist, inventor, and social activist. He is a painter of contemporary modern art paintings and traditional Tussar Pattachitra paintings of Odisha. He was a recipient of the Padma Shri by the Government of India in 2013.

== Personal life and education ==
Meher was born in an artist family in Sonepur town of Odisha state. He studied at Visva-Bharati University, Santiniketan and received a Diploma in Fine Arts from the Visva-Bharati University, Shantiniketan in West Bengal. He was trained in the art of Pattachitra painting initially by his father and subsequently under guidance of Bhagwat Maharana.

His wife Smt. Laxmi Meher and daughter Manisha jointly received National award in 2005. Smt Meher had also received state award in 1990 while daughter Manisha got two state awards in 2001–2002. Both his sons Prakash and Jayanta got National Award in 2001.

== Career ==
Meher worked as an art designer in the Weavers Service Centre in Bhubaneswar, Govt. Of India, under Development Commissioner Handloom, New Delhi from 1978 to 1993 creating textile designs for weavers and weaving organisations, and developed some old Bomkai designs, which were developed into a product called "Bomkai Sari".

Meher creates new designs, techniques with research and experiments, aiming for better market promotion in India and abroad. His tree paintings were presented as an example for the Shilp Guru award.

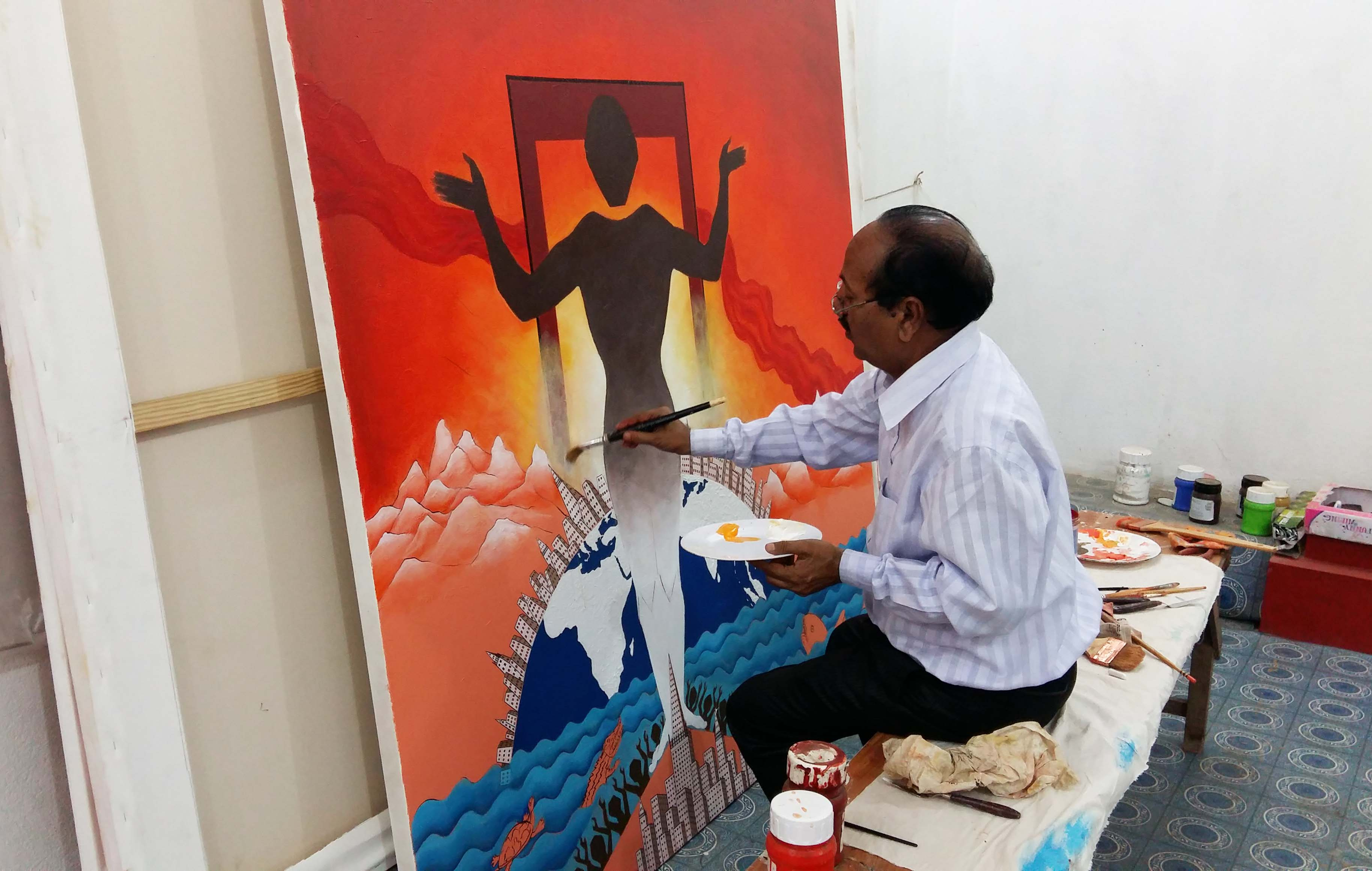
Kailash Ch. Meher while on work at his studio in the year 2016.

For the poorest girls & women of KBK district, he has started many social organisations with the help and support of The Collector (District Magistrate) for giving them training & employment, so he started some Handloom, Handicraft & Fine Art organisation like :- 1. Indian Art & Craft Academy for Women 2. Indira Gandhi Women Weavers Co-operative Society limited 3. Bharatiya Hastakala Industrial Co-operative Society Limited 4. Handicraft & Handloom Museum and Service Centre for Women.

== Awards ==
- 1979 & 1985 – Orissa Lalit Kala Academy Award
- 1986 – "National Award" by HE the President of India
- 1997 – Viswakarma Award
- 1991 & 2001 – "Kalamani" Award by Chief Minister of Haryana
- 2005 – UNESCO CCI seal of excellence for handicrafts
- 2009 – Shilp Guru Award by HE the President of India
- 2013 – Padma Shri Award by Govt. of India
- 2013 – "Odisha Living Legend Award" by Odisha Diary

== Selected paintings ==
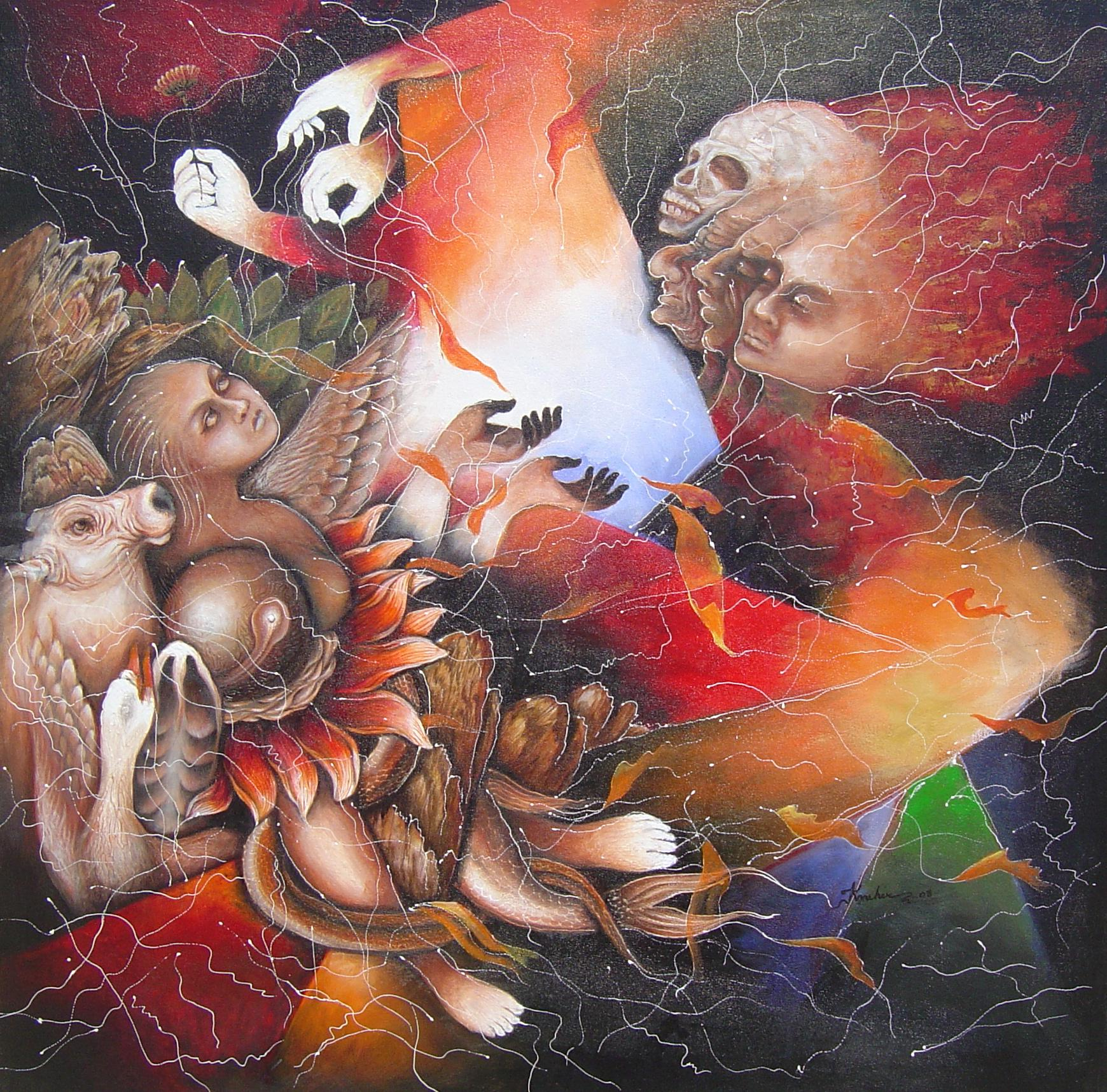
Women Exploitation (W & W), 2008

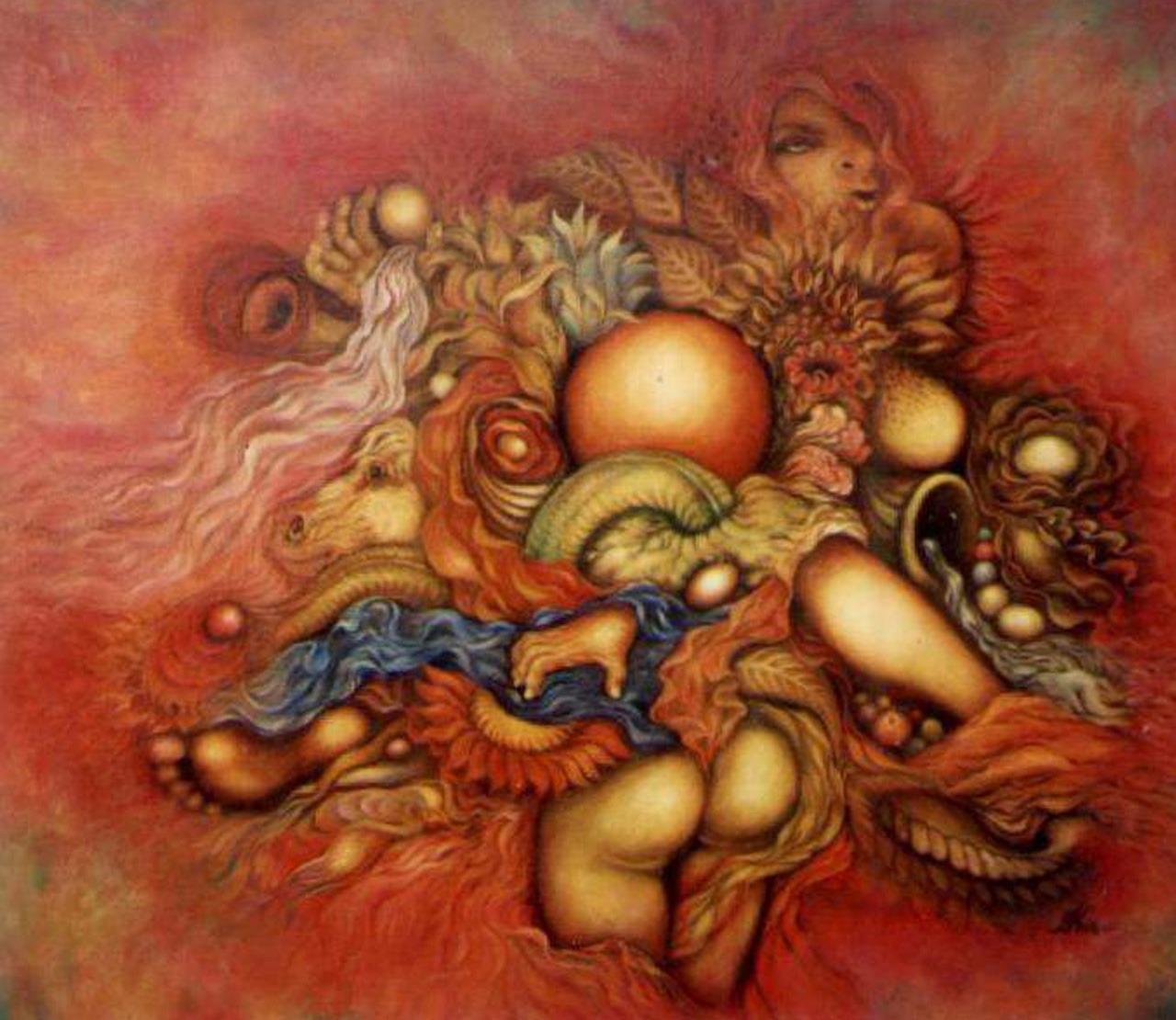
The Creation, 1999

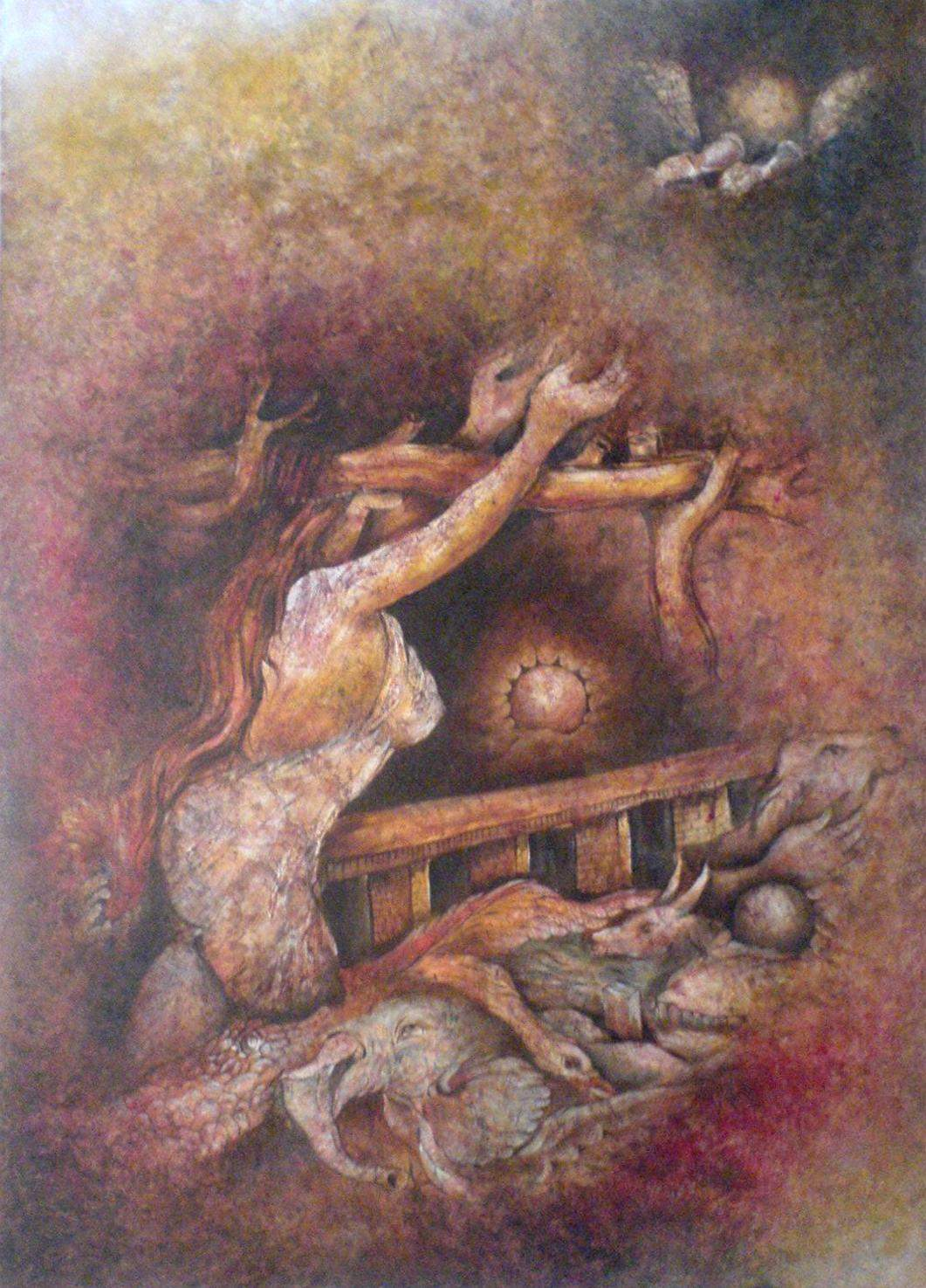
Indian Woman, 2008

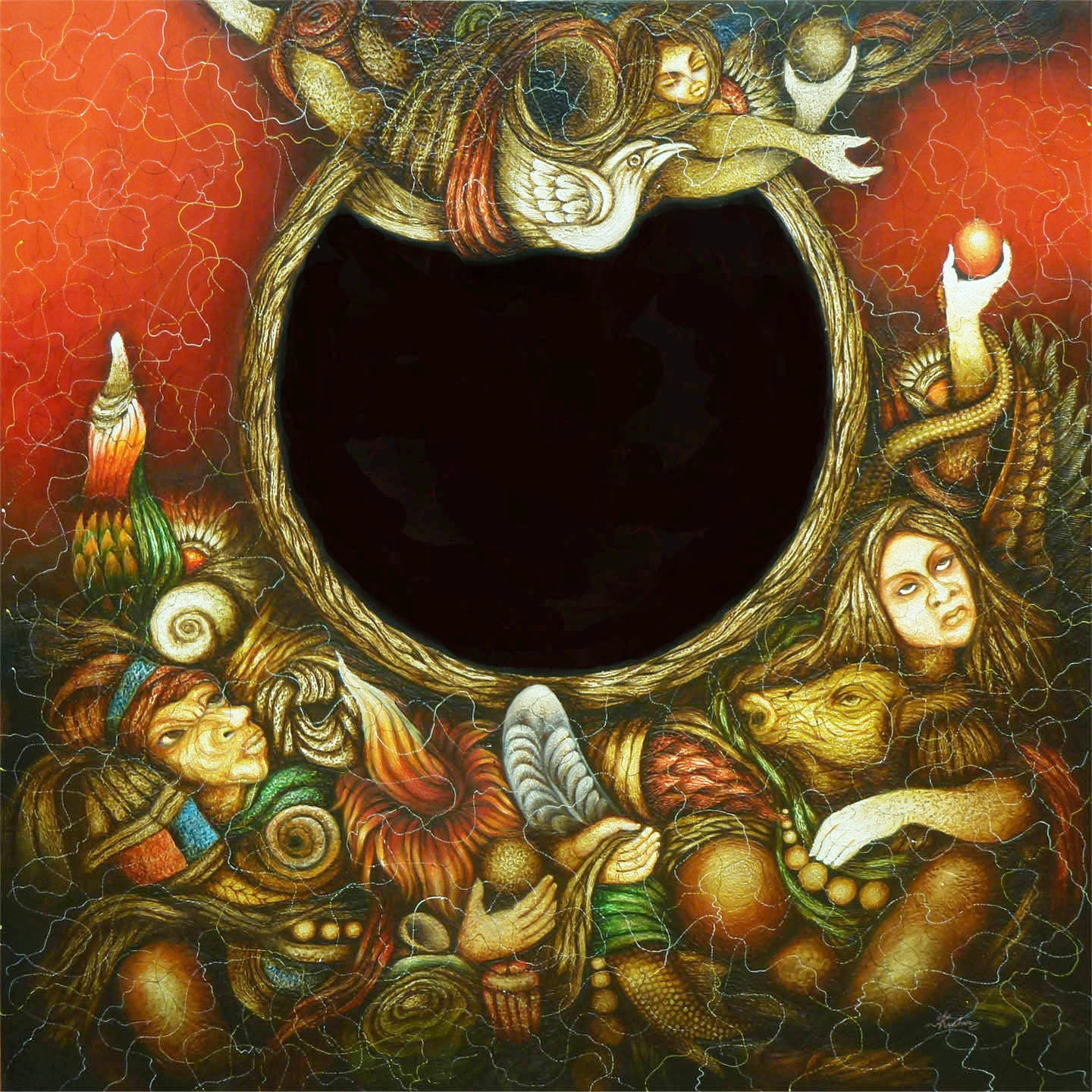
Omm, 2011 Size (4x4) feet

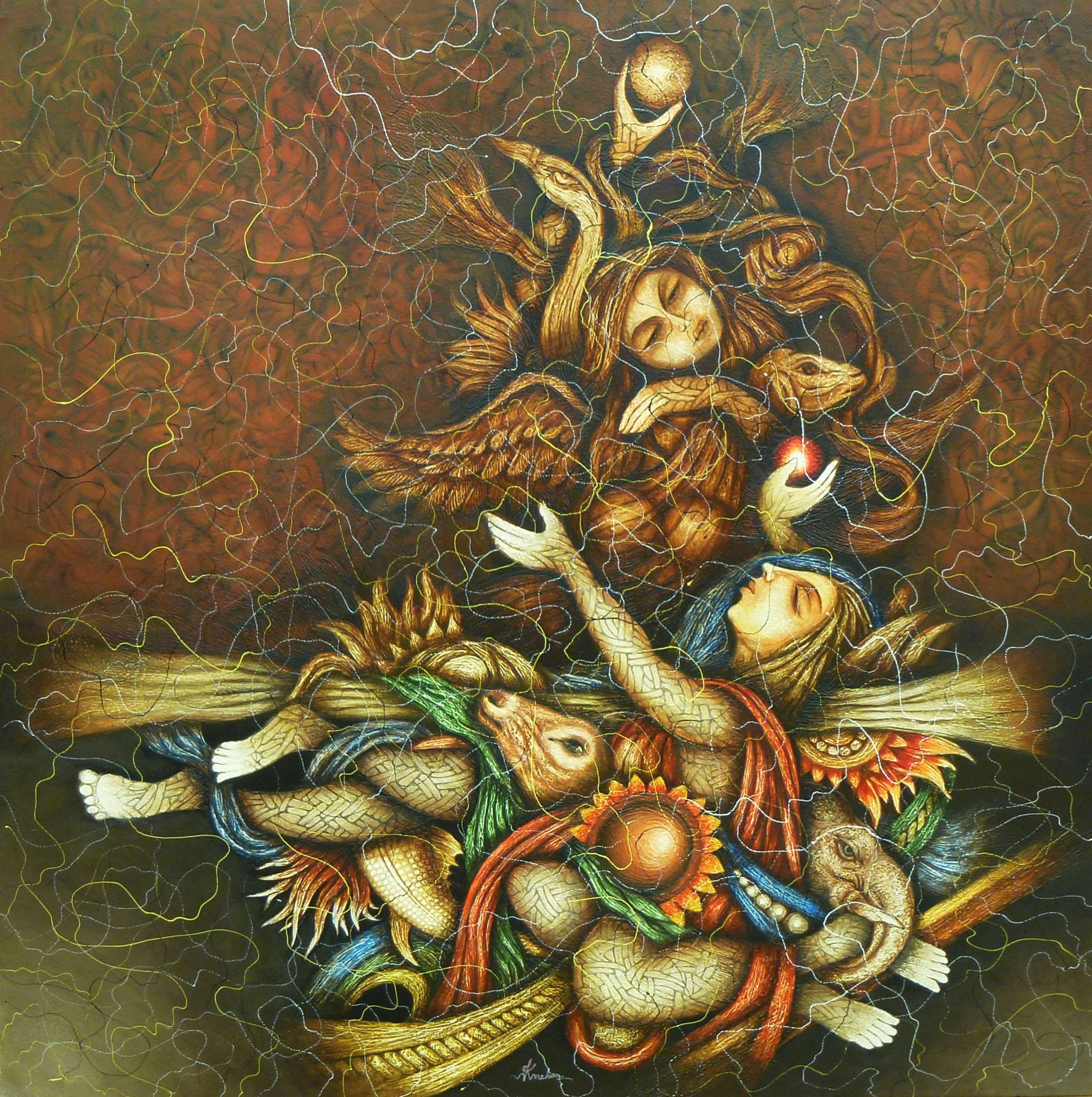
Sarba Sukham, 2011 Size (4x4) feet

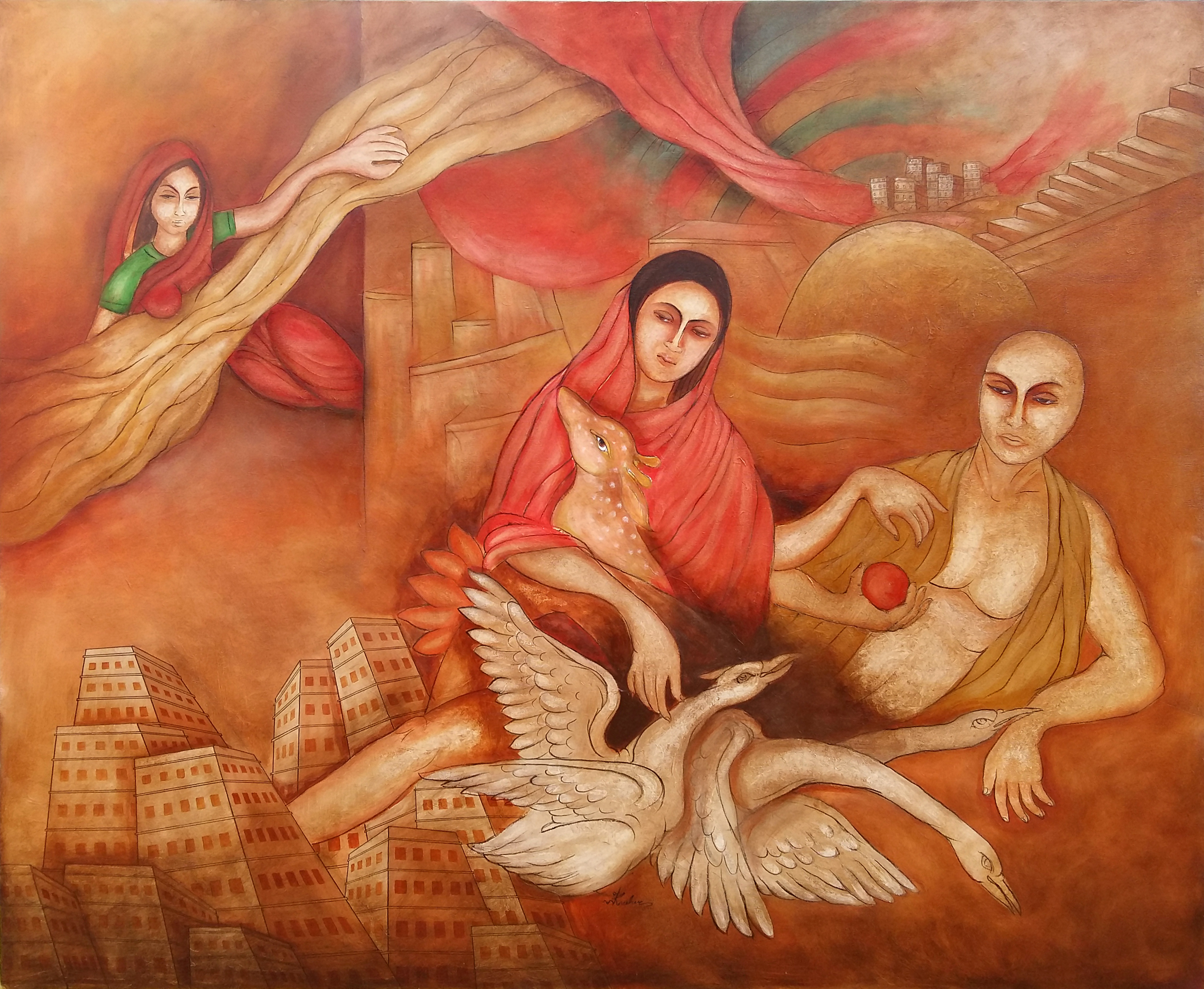
Sweet Dream, 2016 Size (5x6) feet
