= Radhanath Ray =

Indian poet

Kabibara Radhanath Ray
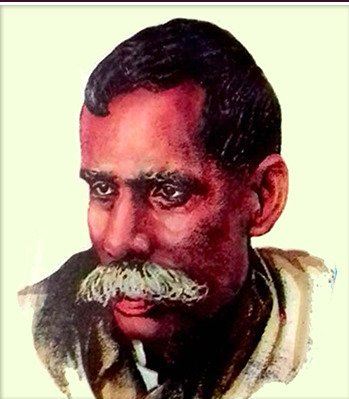
- Portrait of Radhanath Ray
- Born: 28 September 1848; Kedarpur, Baleswar, British India (now Odisha, India)
- Died: 17 April 1908 (aged 59)
- Occupation: Inspector of School
- Spouse: Parasamani
- Writing career
- Language: Odia
- Genres: Poet, novelist, short-story writer, essayist, playwright, educationist, cultural relativist, orator, song-writer.
- Notable works: Kedara Gauri, Chilika

Radhanath Ray (28 September 1848 – 17 April 1908) was an Odia writer of initial modernity era in Odia poetry during the later part of nineteenth century. He was born in a Zamindar Karan family in Baleshwar (Bengal Presidency), now in Odisha, and is honoured in Odia literature with the title Kabibara (transl. Poet Boon). In his early life, he composed in both Odia and Bengali languages, but later he shifted his writings in Odia only. He was born on 28 September 1848, at Kedarpur village in Baleswar district, Odisha. He has contributed verses and poetry for Odia literature in the nineteenth century.

== Role in the Odia language ==
Though the medieval Odia literature was rich and distinct literary tradition and history, some of the Bengali educationalists wanted to abolish Odia language as the medium of teaching from schools. As Bengal was under by British rule much before Odisha, the Bengalis had the privilege to motivate the Anglicist scholars to prove Odia as a branch of Bengali language. However, John Beams, a British officer of East India Company first tried to prove that Odia is more ancient language than Bengali, and it had a richer literature which Bengali had not. In the Odisha division, there were only seven Odia School teachers; Bengalis formed the majority of teachers, even in the remote areas. Consequently, Bengali text books were prescribed for Odia students. At that time, Radhanath was one of prime figure along with Fakir Mohan Senapati, who fought against the expansionism of Bengali educationalist to eradicate Odia language from Odisha. He was the Inspector of Odisha Schools Association and along with Fakir Mohan Senapati and Madhusudan Rao, he tried to promote text book writings.

== Major works ==
Radhanatha Ray's first major work was Kabitabali, a collection of poems in Bengali written at the age of eighteen. It featured in most of the major newspapers and journals in Kolkatta during that time. His other Bengali poem was Lekhabali. Later, he switched over to Odia language, and wrote famous Kavyas like Kedara Gauri, Nandikeshwari, Chilika, Mahajatra – Jajatikeshari, Tulasistabaka, Urbashi, Darabara, Dasaratha Biyoga, Savitri Charita and Mahendra Giri. Additionally, he wrote more than fifteen essays. Apart from his original works, he is also known for his translations and adaptations from the Latin Literature. They include Usha, Chandrabhaga and Parbati.

== Father of Odia Modernism ==
His writings were inspired by many English Littérateurs like Keats, Scott and Wordsworth. He has contributed to Odia poetry by introducing new forms. He has penned blank-verses, satire inspired by writings of Dryden and Alexander Pope, denunciation of despots, tyrants and oppressors, concern with social problems, a spirit of protest against conventional morality, a disbelief in the power of gods and goddesses, and patriotic sentiments, which finally brought him trouble from his employers. He was viewed as a national poet of the first order in Odisha.

== Controversy ==
Though Radhanatha contributed a lot to Odia literature, however he was not accepted by the contemporary conservative readers of his time. Soon, he was dragged into a controversy. Sudhala Dev, the then king of Bamanda awarded the poet the title 'Kabibara', and the gesture made some of the critics and poets jealous. Some critics wrote that Kabi Samrat Upendra Bhanja is more powerful than Radhanatha, and these arguments turned into a serious topic of controversy like modernity versus tradition. Two of the literary journals The Indradhanu and The Bijuli engaged in this controversy, and later all the intellectuals got entangled in this discussion. However, this literary controversy ended with a letter of Radhanath.

== See also ==
- Odia literature
- Odia language
- List of Indian poets
