= Jachindra Rout =

Indian poet (born 1965)

- Born: October 7, 1965 (age 60); Jajpur, Orissa, India
- Occupation: Poet
- Children: 2

Jachindra Rout is an Oriya poet and translator, who writes in both English and Oriya.

== Career ==
He has published over 12 poetry collections, 3 essay collections, a travelogue and numerous translations, including The Voice of the Struggle, an autobiography of S.J Bhagabat Prasad Mohanty.. His poetry collections have been published in both English and Oriya.

== Early life ==
Rout was born on October 7, 1965, in Gobandia, Palai Jajpur, situated near the Lalitagiri and Olasuni Gumpha, the eldest son of Jaladhara and Gelhamani Rout. He has B.A. and M.A. degrees from Utkal University, and also completed P.G.D.T.E, C.I.E.F.L. qualifications in Hyderabad.

== Literary Awards ==
- Poet of the year (2003) Poet International.
- Kabi Kanja (Subha sankha)
- Poet of the State (Sathi Orissa )
- Gunduchimusa Saman-2009
- Editor Choice Awards (Holi)
- Sattavdi Sammman (Biswa Oriya Prajna Parisada, Dhenkanal)

== Works in English ==
- The Voice of the Struggle
- Khandagiri & Udayagiri
- Listen Silently
- Chitropala Higher English Grammar
- A Criticism to Kaju Kasi Ikeda
- Easy English Grammar for Children

== Works in Oriya ==
- Dutta Akhi
- Dathabiz
- Kharabela
- Krushna Ku Chithi
- Amanisha nka Kabita
