= Geeta Mahalik =

Indian Odissi dancer (born 1948)

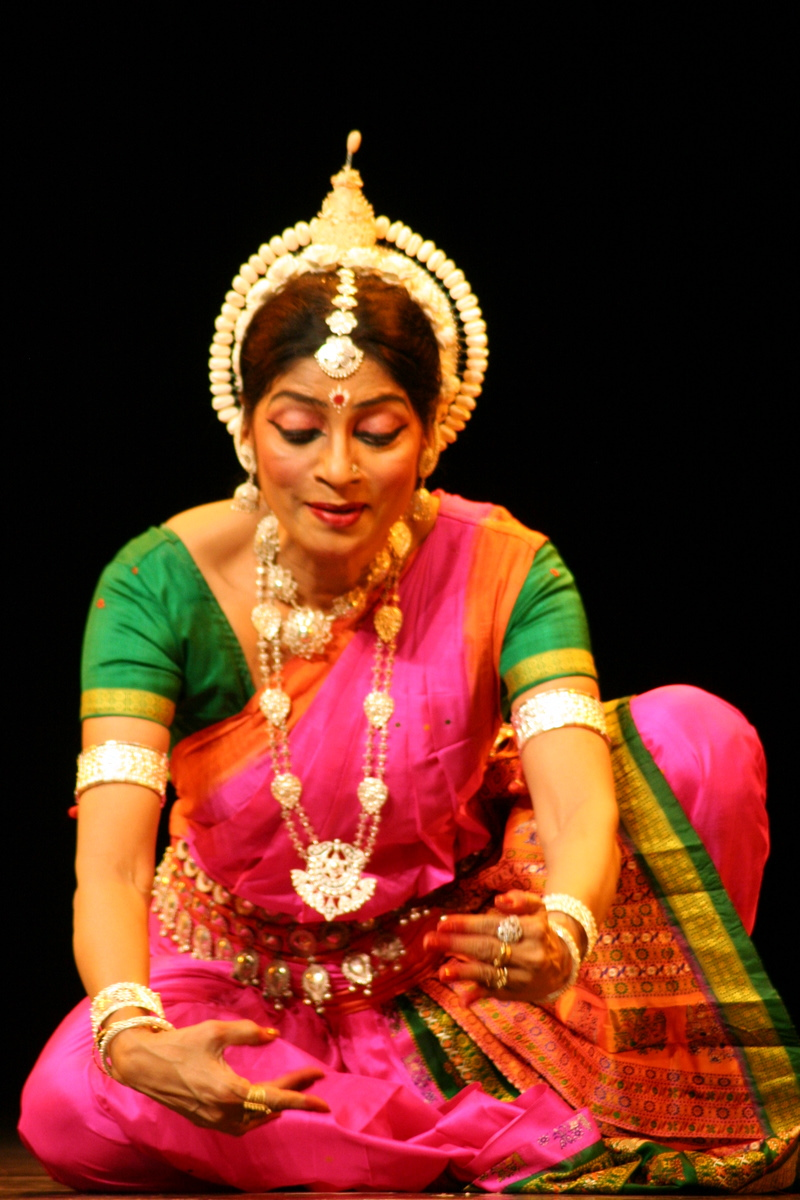
- Born: 1948 (age 77–78); Koraput, Odisha, India
- Occupation: Classical dancer
- Awards: Padma Shri; Kendra Sangeet Natak Akademi Award; Odisha Sangeet Natak Akademi Award; Gramini Award
- Website: http://about.me/GeetaMahalik

Geeta Mahalik (born 1948) is an Indian Odissi dancer. The Government of India honoured her with the Padma Shri in 2014 for her services to the field of art and culture.

== Biography ==
Gita Mahalik began her training at a very early age from renowned guru, Deba Prasad Dash. This was followed by coaching under Mayadhar Raut which helped Geeta to develop a style which many connoisseurs described as sheer poetry in motion.

Geeta has travelled extensively, performing in many countries across the globe like France, Switzerland, China, Italy, Spain, USA, Canada, Germany, Portugal, Greece and many other countries in the African continent. She has also performed at almost all of the major dance festivals in India, Khajuraho Dance Festival, Ellora Dance Festival, Elephanta Dance Festival, Konarak Dance Festival, Mahabalipuram Festival, Mukteshwar Dance Festival, Badri Kedar Utsav, Taj Festival, Kalidas Samaroh at Ujjain, Ganga Mahotsav and Mandu Festival featuring among them.

Geeta Mahalik presently lives in Delhi.

== Legacy ==
Geeta Mahalik is generally credited with giving a national flavor to the traditional style of Odissi. She is also widely known to be a master of 'Rasa' (expression).

Geeta has choreographed many dance dramas such as Lavanyavati, Krishnabhilasha and Draupadi - Antim Prashna which have won critical acclaim. It is reported that she has brought in many innovative interpretations and religious and secular overtones through her choreography.

Geeta Mahalik has founded a non-governmental organization, Geeta's Upasana, based in Delhi, for promoting arts and culture, especially odissi dance. The organization regularly stages performances in Delhi and outside.

== Positions ==
- Founder Director - Geeta's Upasana
- Member - Expert Committee on Odissi dance - Ministry of Culture
- Member - General Council - Sangeet Natak Akademi
- Member - General Council - Odisha Sangeet Natak Akademi

== Awards and recognitions ==
- Padma Shri - Government of India - 2014
- Kendra Sangeet Natak Akademi Award - 2010
- Odisha Sangeet Natak Akademi Award - 2012
- Gramini Award - India International Rural Cultural Centre
- Senior National Fellowship - Ministry of Culture, Government of India

Geeta Mahalik is on the artists panel of the Indian Council for Cultural Relations.
