= Brajanath Ratha =

Indian poet (1936–2014)

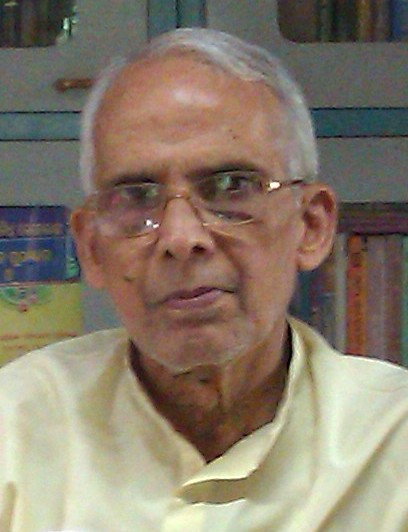
- Brajanath Ratha, 2011
- Born: 12 January 1936; Sunhat, Balasore, Odisha
- Died: 31 May 2014 (aged 78); Sunhat, Balasore, Odisha
- Occupations: Poet, writer, essayist, social activist
- Spouse: Pushpalata Devi
- Writing career
- Language: Odia
- Genres: Poetry, philosophical fiction, satire
- Notable works: Samanya Asamanya, Manara Manachitra
- Notable awards: Odisha Sahitya Academy Award (1984); Atibadi Jagannath Das award (2012)

Signature
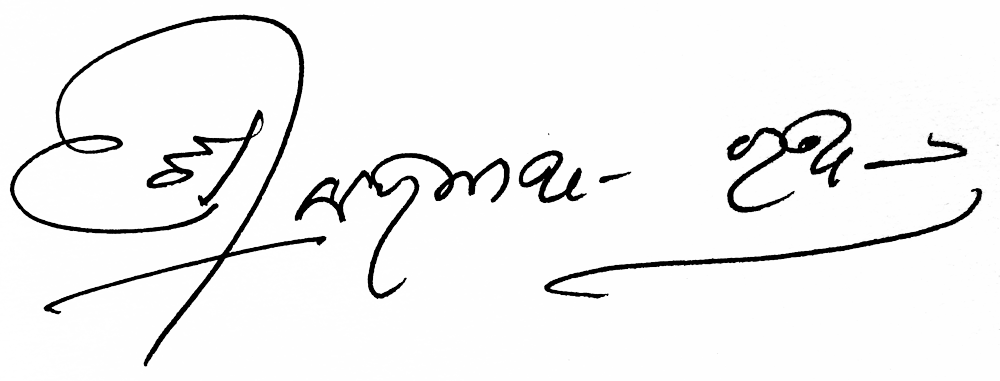

Brajanath Ratha (12 January 1936 – 31 May 2014) was an Indian poet who wrote in the Odia language. Ratha is internationally recognised and is the recipient of many awards such as the Odisha Sahitya Academy Award, Vishuba Award, Gokarnika Award, First Shudramuni Sahitya Award and Honoured by South Korea's Ambassador, from Global Cooperation Society International, Seol, Republic of Korea for Contribution in World Welfare, Cooperation and Services.

Ratha was awarded with Tagore Literature Awards in 2010 for Samanya Asamanya, a poetry collection containing three types of poems: progressive, satirical and philosophical. His first poem was written to welcome India's independence in 1947. He has been conferred with honours from the Odisha Sahitya Academy Award for Manara Manachitra (Map of the Mind) to the Silver Jubilee Award for poetry by Prajatantra Prachar Samiti, Cuttack.

== Selected works ==
=== Poetry ===
- Marugolap (1960)
- Nijaswa Sanlap (1969)
- Nishabda Pratibad (1977)
- Sabhyatara Munha (1979)
- Manara Manachitra (1984)
- He Mahajibana! (1991)
- Laghu Sataka (1993)
- He Mora Swadesh! (1997)
- Gadigadi Gali Ball (2001)
- Swanirbachita Kabita (2001)
- Samayara Shabdalipi (2007)
- Samanya Asamanya (2007)
- Eka Eka Ekapadi (2009)

== Awards and honours ==
=== Awards ===
- Vishuba Silver Jubilee Award, 1974; for poetry by Prajatantra Prachar Samiti, Cuttack.
- Odisha Sahitya Akademi Award, 1984; for "Manara Manachitra" (poetry)
- Kabishekhar Chintamani Award, 1995;
- Justice Harihara Mohapatra Smaraka Award, 1996;
- Vishuba Award, 1997;
- Gokarnika Award, 1999;
- Punarnaba Anadi-Ananta Kabita Award, 2002;
- First Shudramuni Sahitya Award, 2009; By Sea-Shore Sahitya Academy, Bhubaneswar, Odisha.
- 1st Tagore Literature Awards, 2010; for Samanya Asamanya (poetry collection) by Kendra Sahitya Akademi.

=== Honors ===
- Sarala Smaraka Samman, 1983;
- Kalahandi Samman, 1993;
- Shriparna Samman, 1998; Puri.
- Gangadhar Meher Kabita Samman, 1999; From Utkala Sahitya Samaj, Cuttack.
- Utkalashri Samman, 2001; From Utkal-Sahitya Kala Parishad, Cuttack.
- Jibana Ranga Samman, 2001; Cuttack.
- Dasharathi Pattnayak Library Trust Samman, 2002; Udaypur, Nayagarh.
- Kunjabana Sahitya Samman, 2002; Dasapalla, Nayagarh.
- Sahitya-Bharati Samman, 2003; From Gangadhar Ratha Foundation.
- Vishuba Samman, 2003; From Kalinga Sanskrutika Parishada, JKPur, Rayagada.
- Vishuba Samman, 2004; From Aadarsha Pathagara, Rourkela.
- Sahitya Samman, 2005; From Kharashrota Sanskrutika Parishada, Kandiahat, Kendrapada.
- Nandkishore Samal Smruti Samman, 2005; Kusupur, Cuttack.
- Janasudha PujyaPuja Samman, 2005; Cuttack.
- Kalia Panigrahi Smruti Samman, 2005; From Kalinga Sahitya Samaj, Brahmapur, Ganjam.
- Sahityaka Ananta Prasad Panda Shatadhi Samman, 2006; Cuttack.
- Baishakhi Samman, 2006; Rourkela.
- Bharatchandra Nayak Smruti Sahitya Samman, 2006; From Sambalpur University.
- Shishu Sahitya Sansad Samman, 2007; Jaleswar.
- Kabi Ramakrushna Sahu Smruti Samman, 2007; Baripada.
- Kabi Sacchiroutray Sahitya Samman, 2007; From Bhubaneswar Bookfare.
- Pujyapuja Samman, 2007; From Fakirmohan University.
- Sagarika Sahitya Samman, 2007;
- Kabi Jayashankar Prasad Rashtriya Sahitya Samman, 2007; By Rashtriya Hindi Akademi, Kolkata.
- Kabi Chakrabarti Brajanath badajena Samman, 2007; Dhenkanal.
- Hirak Jayanti Samman, 2008; By Fakirmohan Sahitya Parishada.
- Subarna Jayanti Samman, 2009; From Pragati Utkala Sangha, Rourkela.
- Abasara Saraswata Pratibha Samman, 2009; Basudevpur, Bhadrak.
- Honoured by South Korea's Ambassador, 2010; From Global Cooperation Society International, Seol, Republic of Korea for Contribution in World welfare, Cooperation and Services.
- Chhatragourav Samman, 2010; by Fakir Mohan University.
- Dibya Sevanidhi Samman, 2010; by Dibya Jiban Sangha, Balasore.
- Doctor of Literature (Honoris Causa) (D. Litt.) by Fakirmohan University, Baleswar in the year 2011.
- Sahitya Bharati Samman – 2011

== See also ==
- Odia literature
- Odia language
- List of Indian poets
- Manu Dash interviews Brajanath Rath
