= Biswambhar Parida =

Indian Freedom fighter

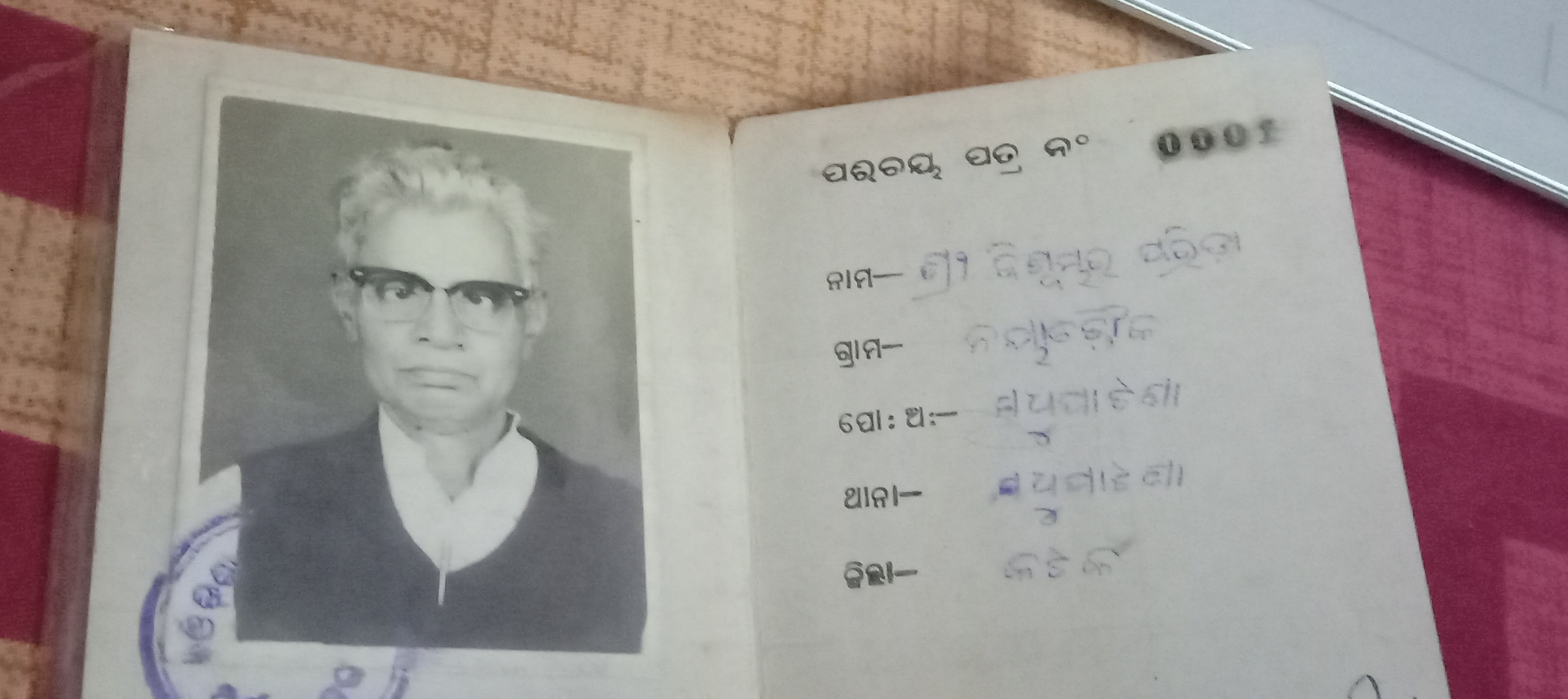
File Photo of Late Biswambhar Parida, Freedom Fighter belonging to year 1987

Biswambhar Parida (8 February 1921 – 25 November 1999) was an Indian Freedom fighter who was born in Jagatsinghpur District in Indian state of Odisha. He plunged into Indian Independence Movement at a very early age, was a devout follower of Gandhian Freedom Movement and was imprisoned for around two years. He got himself involved in many social, literary and organizational activities among his in-mates and fellow Freedom Fighters, while being at Berhampur Prison.

After Independence of India, Parida devoted himself to the field of journalism in the leading regional newspapers of Odisha, such as The Samaja and The Prajatantra, for more than 40 years. While working for The Prajatantra, he remained a close associate of Dr. Harekrushna Mahatab, First Chief Minister of Odisha and ex – Governor of Undivided Bombay State. Till his death, Parida remained one of the five permanent Trust Board Members of The Prajatantra Prachar Samiti, founded by Dr. Harekrushna Mahatab. While working for The Prajatantra Prachar Samiti, He came in acquaintance with many prolific and dignified politicians of Odisha including multiple Chief Ministers of Odisha like Dr. Harekrushna Mahatab, Nabakrushna Choudhuri, Biju Patnaik, Nilamani Routray, Janaki Ballabh Patnaik etc.

He was quite active in literary circles also. His collection of short poems, Shatabdira Dyani is widely acclaimed in Odia literary sphere. He had also composed Mukti Sangramare Odisha in Odia, tracking the history of Indian Independence Movement from the prospective of Odisha.

He ascended to the top ranks of the State-level and National-level Freedom Fighters' Organization. He remained President of All Odisha Freedom Fighters' Samiti and Vice – President of All India Freedom Fighters' Samiti for many years.

During later stages of his life, Parida was active in several social and cultural organizations in cities of Cuttack & Bhubaneswar and district of Jagatsinghpur and was regarded as one of the most prominent social personalities in the region. He died in Cuttack on 25 November 1999. He was awarded Utkal Jyoti posthumously.
