= Hemangada =

Hemangada (Odia: ହେମଙ୍ଗଦ) was a powerful 4th century C.E.warrior king of the ancient Indian Kingdom of Kalinga (Odisha) who finds elaborate mention in the sixth chapter of Kalidasa's classical Sanskrit literary work, Raghuvansham. According to Kalidasa, Hemangada was present at the Swayamvara of the princess Indumati of Vidarbha as a participant while Sunanda, the counsel of the princess describes his glorious achievements, strength and his kingdom to her. Only besides the mention of Hemangada there are no details about his lineage or the dynasty he belonged to. He could be placed as a vassal of the Gupta rule in Kalinga those days but didn't either belong to the Vindhyatabi Naga or Nala rulers who were prominent or declining in other parts of ancient Tri-Kalinga region in that era.

Since the whole work of Raghuvamsham is based on descriptions for the descendants of a mythical king Raghu, the timeline of Hemangada's existence is also debatable as it is not necessary that he existed as a living personality around the time when Kalidasa composed his work. The existence of the king could very well be before the Guptas as an independent and powerful monarch of Kalinga.

== Sunanda's Description of Hemangada to Indumati ==
Hemangada is described over six stanzas from the chapter (sarga) six in Raghuvasham of Kalidasa.

Chapter 6, Satnza 53

अथाङ्गदालिष्टभुजम् भुजिष्या हेमाङ्गदम् नाम कलिङ्गनाथम् |
आसेदुषीम् सादितशत्रुपक्षम् बालामबालेन्दुमुखीम् बभाषे ॥ ६-५३

Kalidasa writes that as Indumati approaches the proximity of Hemangada, Sunanda explains to her that the king was wearing bicep ornaments in his upper arms and had crushed all his enemies.

Chapter 6, Satnza 54

असौ महेन्द्रादिसमानसारः पतिर्महेन्द्रस्य महोदधेश्च |
यस्य क्षरत्सैन्यगजच्छलेन यात्रासु यातीव पुरो महेन्द्रः ॥ ६-५४

Hemangada is the lord of the Mahendra mountain (a prominent geographical symbol of ancient Kalinga) and the Mahodadhi (as Bay of Bengal was known in that era). When the king marches at the forefront of his army with the fierce appearance of his energetic blood thirsty war elephants at his back, he himself appears like the mount Mahendra.

Chapter 6, Satnza 55

ज्याघातरेखे सुभुजो भुजाभ्याम् बिभर्ति यश्चापभृताम् पुरोगः |
रिपुश्रियाम् साञ्जनबाष्पसेके बन्दीकृतानामिव पद्धती द्वे ॥ ६-५५

The king has glorious arms and is an expert archer. He has two pits on his palms created due to the rigorous use of the bow string. The two pits looked like the pathway to the mixed tears and mascara of the ladies who are close to his enemies whom he had mesmerized in battles.

Chapter 6, Satnza 56

यमात्मनः सद्मनि संनिकृष्टो मन्द्रध्वनित्याजितयामतूर्यः |
प्रासादवातायनदृश्यवीचिः प्रबोधयत्यर्णव एव सुप्तम् ॥ ६-५६

The king of Kalinga and its people are cherished by a great ocean besides it. Hemangada has a beautiful mansion close to the ocean, the waves of which can be seen from the windows. Watch guards are unnecessary as the ocean god himself wakes him up every morning with the rumbling sound of the waves.

Chapter 6, Satnza 57

अनेन सार्धम् विहराम्बुराशेस्तीरेषु तालीवनमर्मरेषु |
द्वीपान्तरानीतलवङ्गपुष्पैरपाकृतस्वेदलवा मरुद्भिः ॥ ६-५७

With such a king like Hemangada you (Indumati) can make pleasure trips to palm tree grooves rustling with palm leaves on the seashore where the fragrance of cloves will be mixed in the air from the spread out islands of the ocean.

== Conclusion ==
In the 58th stanza Kalidasa writes that Indumati who is generally apt to physical appearance and strength turns away from Hemangada as the goddess of fortune turns away from an unfortunate person. The elaborate description of Hemangada in Raghuvamsham indicates to he being a powerful and victorious warrior king who controlled not only the islands of the sea and was known as the lord of the ocean but also had a powerful army on the land with a recognizable number of war elephants at his command which had fought many battles. Kalidasa has also addressed him as Kalinganatha or lord of Kalinga and Mahodadhipati or lord of the oceans in his work.
