= Arun Kar =

- Born: June 6, 1979 (age 47); Odisha, India
- Citizenship: United Kingdom
- Education: Indian Institute of Management Bangalore
- Occupation: Entrepreneur
- Years active: 2000–present
- Known for: Military, business
- Spouse: Nidhi Kar
- Website: www.arunkar.com

Arun Kar (born 6 June 1979) is a British entrepreneur and former military officer. He is the founder and chairman of Nest Group. Kar previously served in the Indian Army and was honoured at the United Nations and the World Economic Forum in Davos for his global humanitarian contributions.

== See also ==
- Entrepreneurship
- Artificial intelligence
- Renewable energy
- Indian Institute of Management Bangalore
