= Chullakalinga =

Ancient prince of Kalinga

Chullakalinga was an ancient prince of Kalinga (Odisha) who has been mentioned clearly in the Chullakalinga Jataka and Kalingabodhi Jataka Buddhist records. Both the Jatakas mention the tale of Chullakalinga in the light that the events happened in the lifetime of a Bodhisttva who might have been visited by Buddha himself later in the period of Kalinga II who was also Chullakalinga's descendant. Chullakalinga existed before the birth of Buddha and his timeline could be cautiously placed around the 6th century BCE but this since the records about him are obtained from the narrations of Buddha himself, it is difficult to place the exact date which could vary immensely to the time before Buddha's era.

== Chullakalinga's Birth and Abdication of Throne ==
Chullakalinga and his elder brother Mahakalinga were born to Kalinga I, the king of Kalinga who might have been a vassal of Dandakarnya forest kingdom known as Dandaka whose ruler was known as Dandaki. The Jatakas speak of the fall and partition of Dandaka into Kalinga, Assaka and Vidarbha kingdoms which were opponents to each other. On the birth of Chullakalinga, fortune tellers prophesied that his elder brother Mahakalinga would become a Chakravatii and he would become an ascetic. Being aware of this prophecy, Chullakalinga became jealous, arrogant and notorious. On becoming the king, Mahakalinga ordered the arrest of Chullakalinga due to his improper behavior. After being informed by a courtier (Kalinga Bahardvaja), Chullakalinga escaped arrest and ran away in the Himalayan forest kingdom of Himavat and lived in the disguise of an ascetic. Before leaving he had shown a ring with a seal, coverlet and sword to the courtier as a token so that he could identify later his son when he returns to claim the throne one day.

== The Runaway Royal Family from Sagala and Marriage of Chullakalinga ==
The King and Queen of the kingdom of Madda (Madra) had run away from their city of Sagala with their daughter. According to the Jatakas, the fortune tellers had predicted that their daughter would give birth to a Chakravartii in future and this prophecy led to a situation when every possible king or prince wanting to produce a powerful heir to their throne in future approached the king for his daughter's hand in marriage. Due to this unfavorable disturbance and interference by multiple powerful kings, the king and queen of Madda ran into the forest for the safety of their daughter.

While taking bath in the river Ganga one day, Chullakalinga encountered the princess in the forest singing and collecting flowers. One of the flowers got stuck in the hair of Chullakalinga and being attracted to her, he followed the princess to her parents. After taking the approval from the convinced King and the Queen, Chullakalinga married the princess. A son with auspicious signs of good luck and virtue was born to both of them who was named as Kalinga (later to be known as Kalinga II).

== Crowning of Chullakalinga's son Kalinga II ==
Kalinga II grew up by learning all the necessary arts of a future king from his father and maternal grandfather. On the death of Mahakalinga in Dantapura, Chullakalinga asked his son to go to the kingdom and claim their ancestral throne. Kalinga II carried the three tokens of his father and met up with Kalinga Bhardvaja who helped him to be crowned as the king. Kalinga Bharadvaja taught the king ten rituals which a universal monarch or Chakravartii had to perform.

== Conclusion ==
Chullakalinga's tale along with that of his son Kalinga II was narrated by Buddha himself as stated in the Jatakas. One of the Jatakas itself is named after him as "Chullakalinga Jataka". Chullakalinga never managed to become a king due to threat from his elder brother and his own unruly behavior as a youth, although he did show the way to his son Kalinga II to become a powerful monarch in the state of Kalinga in the ancient times.
