= Kalinga II =

Kalinga II (Odia: ଦ୍ୱିତୀୟ କଳିଙ୍ଗ) was a powerful monarch and possibly an emperor from around the speculated era towards the end of 7th century BCE. He was the son of Chullakalinga, the youngest son of Kalinga I who had married a virtuous princess from Sagala (Madra). Kalinga II ascended the throne of the ancient state of Kalinga after the death of his paternal uncle Mahakalinga. Kalinga II finds mention in early Buddhist Jataka records of Chullakalinga Jataka (named after his father) and Kalingabodhi Jataka. He had spent most of his young life in the forests of Himavat where his father lived in exile. Trained with qualities of a king by his father and maternal grandfather, he was asked by Chullakalinga to go back to take the charge of his ancestral kingdom.

== Coronation as the King of Kalinga ==
On the request from his father, Kalinga II arrived at Kalinga with the three tokens (a ring with a seal, coverlet and sword) from his father to be shown as symbols of his identity to the courtier Kalinga Bharadvaja who helped his father escape arrest by Mahakalinga. The new king was taught ceremonial and ritualistic rights by Kalinga Bharadvaja and ascended the throne inheriting many precious gifts on the fifteenth day of his coronation.

== Encounter with the Divine Powers of the Bodhi Tree ==
The Jatakas narrate that after becoming the king, Kalinga II wished to visit his parents in the forest and rode on his royal elephant towards the forest. He encountered the Bodhi Tree circuit obstructing his way where Buddha had meditated and had got rid of all the worldly desires of the flesh. Out of impatience and unawareness, Kalinga II tries to make his elephant break through the tree repeatedly. Due to pain endured by repeated hitting of the holy Bodhi Tree, the elephant died while the tree stood at its place without moving. Kalinga Bharadvaja made the king aware of the tree's magical and spiritual power eventually and hence the king gave up imparting force. For seven days Kalinga II worshiped the Bodhi tree circuit with fragrance filled ingredients only after which he was able to pass through the place.

== War with King Aruna of Assaka and Defeat ==
Chullakalinga Jataka narrates about the war affairs between Assaka and Kalinga kingdoms in the final decades of the 7th Century B.C.E. Also corroborated by Kalingabodhi Jataka, the nature of Kalinga II is depicted as warring and beholding the high dignity for his royal status. Pertaining to this Kalinga II declared that he would marry off his four beautiful daughters to any warrior royalty who can defeat him and his army in the battle. To challenge other kingdoms on this declaration, he sent out his daughters on a well decorated chariot with escorts to surrounding kingdoms on which none dared to stop due to his power until it entered Assaka kingdom. There the king Aruna who was equally powerful and also jealous of Kalinga's glory stopped the chariot and took the four princess as captive. With the helpful advises from his minister Nandisena, he was able to defeat the overpowering forces of Kalinga in a long stretched battle though the initial efforts had taken Kalinga II close to victory. This war is believed to be fought at the frontier areas of Assaka and Kalinga according to the Jatakas where the two forces met up at the cross roads of the Deccan but initially only stalked at each other without crossing the boundary between the two empires. Kalinga II had to give up his daughters hand in marriage to Aruna along with a large amount of dowry after the defeat.

== Conclusion ==
Kalinga II was a powerful king and did maintain military superiority over other kingdoms. Though defeated in the battle with Assaka, the ability to march up his forces to its frontiers in the Deccan region shows the territorial extent of his empire could very well be large and not confined to the regions of Odisha and Northern Andhra (the heart land of ancient Kalinga kingdom). Kalinga II was also lenient towards Buddhist ideals as it is found in the narration relating to his encounter with the divine powers of the Bodhi tree.
