= Janta Ka Reporter =

Indian English-language news website

- Website type: News & media website
- Available in: English, Hindi
- Founded: 2015; 11 years ago
- Founder: Rifat Jawaid
- Website: jantakareporter.com

Janta Ka Reporter (Hindustānī: Jantā kā riporṭar, "The Commonfolk’s Reporter") is a news website founded in 2015 by journalist Rifat Jawaid, a former editor at BBC News.

In July 2016, Asaduddin Owaisi, the president of All India Majlis-e-Ittehadul Muslimeen, called the publication an "AAP mouthpiece" and threatened to take legal action over a letter it had published. Yatin Oza, a former BJP member before joining the Aam Aadmi Party (AAP), had authored the correspondence to Delhi Chief Minister Arvind Kejriwal in order to expose alleged corruption within the Bharatiya Janata Party (BJP). The letter claimed that Owaisi and BJP leader Amit Shah discussed how to stir up communal tension before the elections in Bihar and that Owaisi had met with Vijay Rupani, another BJP leader, as well. In response to the legal threat from Owaisi, Janta Ka Reporter challenged him to either "deny or confirm the content of the letter".

In August 2018, it mistook Times How for Times Now, leading to an erroneous report which the publication later apologized for and corrected. Times How is a Twitter account that imitates and parodies Times Now, fooling even WION, Aaj Tak, and Madhu Kishwar in the past.

== Further consideration ==
- Janta Ka Reporter (6 May 2015). "The Story Behind "Janta Ka Reporter" by Rifat Jawaid". www.youtube.com. Janta Ka Reporter.
