= Gurubari Meher =

Gurubari Meher was killed in fighting against a raja in India as part of the struggle to end British rule. Except for a small mention of her participation in the Praja Mandal Movement, very little is known about her. On 28 January 1947, a few months before India became independent, the then (princely) state government of Sonepur let loose a reign of terror at Binika. The people rose in revolt against the king for his pro-British stance. Nearly 20,000 freedom fighters, led by Gurubari Meher, organized a mass movement against the king. Police resorted to baton charge and subsequently the woman leader of the movement was shot dead by the police. A news item had been published in 'Dainik Asha' from Sambalpur with the headline 'Victory For the People of Sonepur' which remains as the sole witness to her contribution.
