= Uday Satpathy =

Indian writer

- Born: India
- Occupation: Writer
- Writing career
- Genres: Fiction, crime thriller
- Notable work: Brutal
- Website: udaysatpathy.com

Uday Satpathy is an Indian thriller novelist. He is credited with authoring crime thriller Brutal, India's first crowd-curated novel. Satpathy lives in Bangalore, India.

== Fiction writing ==
Satpathy's first book Brutal, a crime thriller, was published in August, 2015 by Westland Books (a Tata Group publishing venture) and Bloody Good Book (a publishing venture of Rashmi Bansal and Niyati Patel). Brutal became renowned in the Indian publishing industry because of the unique way through which it was selected for publication. Crowd-curation is a concept in publishing where the screening and selection of manuscripts is crowdsourced. Brutal was selected for publication based on open reviews, popularity and critical acclaim for its manuscript on Bloody Good Book's website.

== Personal life ==
Uday Satpathy is an alumnus of VSSUT, Burla, from where he completed his bachelor's degree in Electrical Engineering with Honours in 2006. He followed it up with a PGDM in 2010 from Xavier Institute of Management, Bhubaneswar. He has worked in Indian IT Companies such as Infosys, Wipro and HCL Technologies, specializing in the Healthcare and Pharmaceutical industry.

== Writing style ==
Satpathy has been an avid thriller reader since his childhood. His favorite authors are thriller masters Robert Ludlum, Steig Larsson and Michael Connelly. Akin to the writing styles of these authors, Brutal's narrative is racy with well-developed characters, the story often dabbing into global politics and espionage. While reviewing Brutal, Hindustan Times commented that "the author has not shied away from addressing even the Israel-Iran conflict, apart from citing real-life instances and connecting them to the plot, including infamous intelligence agencies like Mossad and RAW." Ravi Subramanian, one of India's renowned thriller novelists hailed Satpathy as "a writer to watch out for in the coming years."
