= Laichan Nayak =

Indian politician

Laichan Nayak was an Indian politician from Koraput District, Odisha. he has won twice as a MLA of Jeypore in the elections of 1952 and 1957. In fact he was the first MLA from Jeypore after independence of India.

== Early life and career ==
He was born in Jeypore in the district of Koraput in Odisha. Known as a 'Gentleman Politician' in Odisha, he has been associated with freedom fighting movement and active politics since a very early age. He has also been working as an active worker of UTKAL SAMILANI. He worked for the development of weaker section and eradication of untouchability. He has represented the Jeypore constituency two times [2] in the Odisha legislative assembly and besides being the Leader of Dalits in the assembly had worked hard for the empowerment of Dalits and Adivasis. During his tenure many development works have been taken up and he worked hard in the field of education. He died in the year 1979 leaving his family members consisting of wife Smt. Kandrimani Nayak and a son Rama Chandra Nayak and also a daughter. His family members live in Laichan Nayak Marg, Bapuji Nagar, Jeypore.
