= Madhusudan Rao =

Poet from Odisha, India

Bhaktakabi Madhusudan Rao
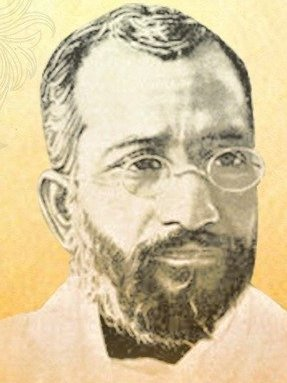
- Born: 29 January 1853; Puri, Odisha, India
- Died: 28 December 1912 (aged 59)
- Occupations: Poet, Essayist
- Writing career
- Genre: Poetry
- Notable works: Prabandhamala, Barnabodha

Madhusudan Rao (29 January 1853 – 28 December 1912) was an Odia poet and writer from India. He was known as Bhaktakabi. His most famous work is the Chhabila Madhu Barnabodha. He was also a prominent acharya of the Brahmo Samaj.

== Life ==
Madhusudan Rao was born on 29 January 1853 in the undivided Puri district of present-day Odisha. His father, Bhagirathi Singh, and mother, Ambika Devi, belonged to the Bratya Marhatta family. Later in life, he embraced the Brahmo Samaj faith.

He received his early education at Puri District School, where he came under the influence of his teacher, the eminent poet Radhanath Ray. This association played a crucial role in nurturing his poetic talents. He passed the matriculation examination in 1869 in second division and completed his First Arts (FA) with first class distinction from Cuttack College in 1871.

Madhusudan Rao dedicated most of his professional life to education. He began his career as the headmaster of Jajpur Middle English School and later joined Baleshwar District School as a second teacher on 29 October 1873. In 1876, he served as an assistant teacher at Cuttack Collegiate School. Over time, he rose through the ranks to become a Deputy Inspector of Schools, later serving as headmaster of Cuttack Training School in 1893. He eventually retired as Additional Inspector of Schools in July 1909.

During his tenure in Balasore, he came into close association with literary figures such as Radhanath Ray and Fakir Mohan Senapati. The literary magazine Utkal Darpan, published in Balasore under the patronage of Prince Baikunthanath De, became an important platform for his early writings.

Madhusudan Rao died on 28 December 1912.

== Works ==
He is known as Bhaktakavi of Odia and is considered the father of modern (using western lyrical forms) Odia poetry.

- In collaboration with Radhanath Ray, he published two volumes, one each in 1873 and 1874, of collections of poems entitled Kavitabali.
- His other poetry collections, which also consist of compositions used as lyrics for songs, comprise:
  - Chhandamala (Vol. 1, 188; Vol. 2, 1895),
  - Sangitamala (1894),
  - Basanta Gatha (1910),
  - Kusumanjali (1903) and
  - Utkalgatha (1908).
- Prabandhamala, published in 1880, is a collection of essays in Odia.
- Apart from writing essays, he translated a few works from Sanskrit and English into Odia. They were published in Utkal Darpan, a literary journal.
- He wrote two short stories.
- He translated the Uttararamacarita of Bhavabhuti into Odia.
- He also contributed to children's literature.
- Rao, Madhusudan (1898). Chandamala (in Odia). The Arunodya Press. OCLC 499869715.
- Rao, Madhusudan (1901). Mahadebi Bhiktoria (in Odia). The Utkal Sahitya Press. OCLC 499865497.
- Rao, Madhusudan (1983). Madhusudana granthabali (in Odia). Grantha Mandira. OCLC 499128674.
- Rao, Madhusudan (1912). Ucca siksaka suhrda (in Odia). OCLC 1046989696.
- Rao, Madhusudan (1922). Karnna badha (in Odia). The Brajendra Press. OCLC 499865888.
- Rao, Madhusudan (1983). Basanta Gatha (in Odia). Phrends Pablisars. OCLC 499610376.
- Rao, Madhusudan (1944). Barnabodha (in Odia). The I.S.S.D. Press. OCLC 499519106.
- Rao, Madhusudan; Kabi, Asita (1972). Kusumañjali : alocana saha (in Odia). Niushtudentas Shtora. OCLC 6304045.
