= Krutibas Nayak =

Indian writer

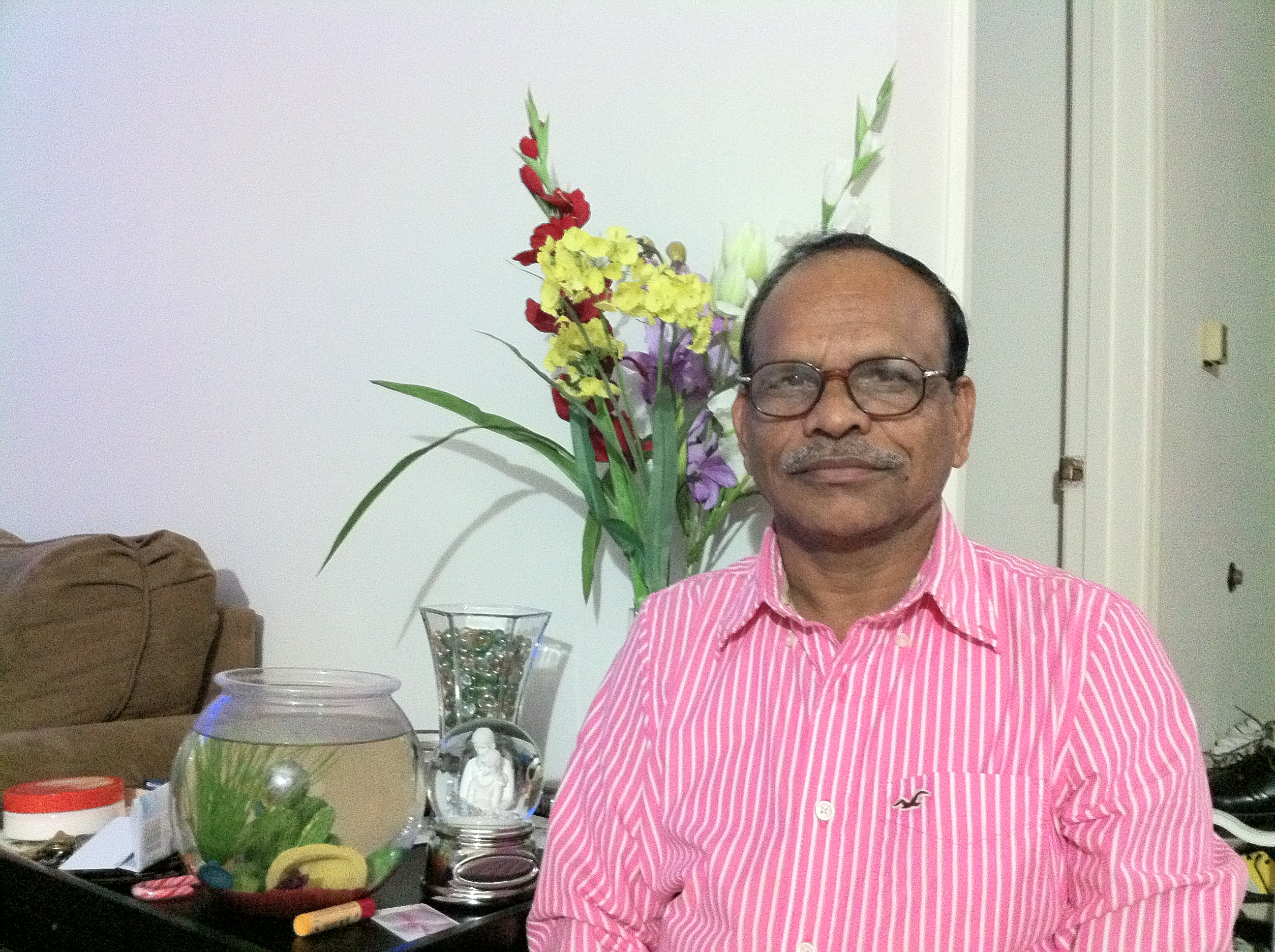
Dr. Krutibas Nayak

Krutibas Nayak (born 1955) is an author in India. He writes articles, poems, stories, novels in Odia. He is a popular leading name in Oriya literature. Nayak has established himself in the field of Children's literature. He is nationally recognized and has received many national and state level recognition.

Nayak was born at an east coast village named Ektala in Rajkanika block of Odisha, India in 1955. He spent his early life in Southern part of Orissa, where he graduated in literature from Berhampur University. Nayak achieved Doctorate degree in 1992 in the field of Children's literature with his thesis named Oriya Shishu Galpara Swaroop O Vikash(Nature and Development of Oriya Children's Stories). During the '80s he edited children's magazine in Odia by names Shishu Nayan, Ame Shishu and Shishu Raija. Shishu Raija was published between 1976 and 1990 from Jeypore in Odisha.

Nayak joined All India Radio in Jeypore, Odisha on 13 December 2012 as Asst. Director and promoted to Station Director on 28 February 2014 and retired on 31 March 2015.

== Awards ==
- 17th annual Abhinandanika Award
- National Award for Hindi writer from non-Hindi speaking area for his novel Shubalakshmi in 2002
- National Award for Children's literature for his children's poem book Phoola Sabu Phutile in 1999
- National Award for Children's literature for his children's novel Banabhoji in 1992
- Vishuba Award in 1986
- Sansar Award (state level) for lifetime achievement in children's literature
- Manika Viswanath Award (state level) for lifetime achievement in children's literature
- Kasturi Award (state level) for his Lyrics
- Srikhetra Samman for his Lyrics
- " Utkala Sahitya Sammana" for his contribution to Oriya Literature in 2011
- Akashvani Annual Award for best production on Women Programme in 2011

== Selected works ==
Nayak has authored more than 200 books (252) to be precise) till date. Here are some of his selected works.

=== Novels ===
- Shubhalakshmi
- Koola Bohu
- Hasakuri Janha

=== Story collections ===
- Sadananda Babunka Sansar
- Sunima Heu
- Tima Fakir
- Prema Purnima

=== Lyrics ===
- Udigale Gendaliya
- Preeti Shatak
- Geeti Shatak
- Bhakti Shatak
- Jeevan Bhagabat
- Prema Preeti Pranaya
- Divya Vani
- Amrut Bachan
- Unnat Jeevan
- Pranaya Jhankara
- Preeti Veena
- Sangeet Suribhi
- Geeti Vichitra
- Odia Jatira Ladhua Veera

=== Children's literature ===
- Bana Bhoji
- Phoola Sabu Phootile
- Maja Gapa
- Aasa Aame Gapa Padhiba
- Dadgua Azanka Maza Kahani
- Kiachhi Maza Kichhi Taza Kahani

=== Plays ===
- Ochha Mahasangha
- Betar Nataka

=== Byanga Kavita ===
- Krutibasanka Bibhin Avatar

=== Biographical ===
- Srujana Sanlapa : This is a comprehensive summary of the Literary career and activities of Kruttibas Nayak. Published by Vikash Pratisthan, Jeypore.
- Prerna
- Nabam Parba: Bengali Novel written by Swpna Maya Chakravarty based on life style of Kruttibas Nayak, Published by Anand Bazar Publications, Kolkata-1996
