= Ghanshyam Panigrahi =

Indian Freedom fighter

Ghanashyam Panigrahi was a freedom fighter and an Indian politician.

He was born on 27 October 1881, at Manpur, a village now situated in the Bargarh district of Orissa. The middle son of Uddhaba Panigrahi and Rahi Devi, he started his career as a school teacher at the age of 12 with a monthly salary of Rs.10/-. While he was working as a teacher in village Ganiapali around 1910, he came into contact with a local Kaviraja, a practitioner of Ayurvedic medicines and thus he began his long innings in Ayurveda. He was an active member of Indian National Congress till India achieved independence. In 1921 he attended the All India Congress Committee Meeting at Ahmedabad as a representative of the Sambalpur District Congress Committee. After returning from Ahmedabad he devoted his time and energy to enrolling people as primary members of the Congress party, particularly in the eastern part of the then Sambalpur district and in Sonepur and Birmaharajpur area of Bolangir. This was the most hectic period in his life when he walked from village to village explaining to the people the message of Gandhiji and of the Congress. Though the students of Zilla School were the first to adopt the non-co-operation movement in Orissa by abstaining form their classes, he was one of the first individuals to take the lead in organizing the movements in the rural areas of Sambalpur with the help of other volunteers. Ghanashyam Panigrahi also played an important role in the establishment of the National School at Sambalpur in 1921 for imparting training to the congress volunteers to enable them to effectively participate in the freedom struggle.
