= Suhrawardi =

Suhrawardi or Sohrevardi or variants may refer to:

- Suhrawardiyya, a Sufi order
  - Abu al-Najib Suhrawardi (1097–1168), founder of the order
    - Shihab al-Din 'Umar al-Suhrawardi (c. 1145 – 1234), his nephew
- Shahab al-Din Yahya ibn Habash Suhrawardi (1154–1191), Persian philosopher and founder of the Iranian school of Illuminationism
- Huseyn Shaheed Suhrawardy (1892–1963), Bengali politician and lawyer, and prime minister of Pakistan
  - Zahid Suhrawardy (1870–1949), his father, an Indian Bengali jurist
  - Hasan Shaheed Suhrawardy (1890–1965), his brother, Bengali writer and diplomat
- Ubaidullah Al Ubaidi Suhrawardy (1832–1885), Bengali educationist and writer
  - Abdullah Al-Mamun Suhrawardy (1877–1935), his son, Bengali Islamic scholar, barrister, and academic
  - Hassan Suhrawardy (1884–1946), his son, Bengali surgeon, military officer, politician, and public official
- Ibrahim Suhrawardy (1896–1972), Indian teacher and linguist
- Nilofar Suhrawardy (fl. from c. 2003), Indian freelance journalist and author
- Begum Badar un nissa Akhtar (1894–1956), Indian social reformer and educator, daughter of Aminuddin Al Amin Suhrawardy

== See also ==
- Sohrevard, Iran
- Suhrawardy Udyan, a national memorial in Dhaka, Bangladesh
