= Medinipur division =

Division in West Bengal, India

- Division
- Location of Medinipur division in West Bengal
- Coordinates: 22°25′N 87°19′E
- Country: India
- State: West Bengal
- Headquarters: Medinipur

Government
  - Districts: Bankura, Jhargram, Paschim Medinipur, Purba Medinipur, Purulia
  - DC: Avanindra Singh, IAS
  - DIG: Anoop Jaiswal, IPS

Area
  - Total: 30,280 km^{2} (11,690 sq mi)

Population (2011)
  - Total: 18,672,669
  - Density: 616.7/km^{2} (1,597/sq mi)

Languages
  - Official: Bengali
  - Additional official: English
- Time zone: UTC+05:30 (IST)
- Website: wb.gov.in

Medinipur division is one of the 5 divisions in the Indian state of West Bengal. It is the westernmost division of West Bengal. Earlier it was a part of Burdwan division and was curved out from it in 2016. The port city of Haldia is located in this division.

== Districts ==
It consists of 5 districts:

Code	District	Headquarters	Established	Sub-Division	Area	Population As of 2011	Population Density	Map
ME	Purba Medinipur	Tamluk	2002	Tamluk Sadar; Haldia; Egra; Contai	4,736 km^{2} (1,829 sq mi)	5,094,238	1,076/km^{2} (2,790/sq mi)	
ME	Paschim Medinipur	Medinipur	2002	Kharagpur; Medinipur Sadar; Ghatal	6,308 km^{2} (2,436 sq mi)	5,943,300	636/km^{2} (1,650/sq mi)	
PU	Purulia	Purulia	1956	Purulia Sadar; Manbazar; Raghunathpur; Jhalda	6,259 km^{2} (2,417 sq mi)	2,927,965	468/km^{2} (1,210/sq mi)	
BN	Bankura	Bankura	1947	Bankura Sadar; Khatra; Bishnupur	6,882 km^{2} (2,657 sq mi)	3,596,292	523/km^{2} (1,350/sq mi)	
JH	Jhargram	Jhargram	2017	Jhargram Sadar	3,037.64 km^{2} (1,172.84 sq mi)	1,136,548	374/km^{2} (970/sq mi)	
Total	5	—	-	15	27,223 km^{2} (10,511 sq mi)	18,672,669	686/km^{2} (1,780/sq mi)	

== Demographics ==
Religion in Medinipur Division (2011 Indian Census)
1. Hinduism (82.3%)
2. Islam (9.10%)
3. Others (8.60%)

Hindus form the majority of the population of Medinipur division and comprises 82.3% of the population. There is a significant population of various tribes in this division such as Kudmi, Santhal, Munda, etc. Muslims comprises 9.1% of the population.

== Notable people ==
- Birendranath Sasmal, independence activist, barrister, freedom fighter and politician
- Satish Chandra Samanta, freedom fighter, politician and principal leader of Tamralipta Jatiya Sarkar
- Sushil Kumar Dhara, freedom fighter, politician & another leader of Tamralipta Jatiya Sarkar
- Ajoy Mukherjee, freedom fighter, politician & former Chief Minister of West Bengal
- Serajuddin Ahmad, MLA for Midnapore
- Syed Shah Mehr Ali Alquadri Al Baghdadi (1808–1868), Sufi saint
- Sheikh Siraj Ali, politician
- Tamal Bandyopadhyay, Indian business journalist
- Syed Shamsul Bari, politician
- Rajnarayan Basu, writer and proponent of Young Bengal movement
- Anirban Bhattacharya, actor in Tollywood movies
- Khudiram Bose, one of the youngest martyrs of the Indian Independence Movement.
- Soumya Sankar Bose, Photographer
- Byomkes Chakrabarti, Linguist, writer and poet
- Ramapada Chowdhury, Bengali author and editor
- Souhardya De, orientalist and Bal Puraskar recipient
- Mahasweta Devi, writer and Magsaysay Award winner
- Nirmal Jibon Ghosh, revolutionary
- Sheikh Najmul Haque, six-term legislator
- Syed Moazzam Hossain, politician
- Sheikh Humayun Kabir, state minister
- Hemchandra Kanungo, an Indian nationalist and prime organiser of Anushilan Samiti
- Sheikh Jahangir Karim, teacher and politician
- Ghulam Faruque Khan, politician and businessman
- Selima Khatun, teacher and politician
- Abha Maiti, freedom fighter, former minister of West Bengal and Government of India
- Moulana Muhammad Momtaz, Islamic scholar and politician
- Mohiuddin Nawab, novelist, screenwriter and poet
- Tawfique Nawaz, lawyer
- Anath Bondhu Panja, freedom fighter, member of the Bengal Volunteers, martyred after successfully assassinating oppressive District magistrate Bernard E. J. Burge.
- Narayan Chandra Rana, scientist
- Suhrawardy family
  - Begum Badar un nissa Akhtar, social reformer
  - Khujista Akhtar Banu, writer and educationist
  - Abdullah Al-Mamun Suhrawardy, Islamic scholar, barrister and academic
  - Hasan Shaheed Suhrawardy, diplomat and poet
  - Huseyn Shaheed Suhrawardy, Chief Minister of Bengal during British period, Prime Minister of Pakistan and founder of the Awami League
  - Ubaidullah Al Ubaidi Suhrawardy, Islamic scholar, educationist and author
  - Zahid Suhrawardy, jurist
  - Begum Akhtar Sulaiman, social worker and political activist
- Ishwar Chandra Vidyasagar, reformer and philanthropist, key figure of the Bengal Renaissance.
- Zamindar family of Midnapore
  - Sir Abdur Rahim KCSI, President of India
  - Jalaludin Abdur Rahim, diplomat and political philosopher
- Matangini Hazra, freedom fighter, martyr in Quit India Movement
- Madhusudan Jana, doctor, journalist, teacher and social worker. Founder of Nihar Press
- Basanta Kumar Das, freedom fighter, politician, member of the Constituent Assembly which helped to create the Constitution of India
- Nikunja Behari Maiti, Independence activist, politician, first Education Minister of West Bengal
- Anil Ghorai, poet, novelist and short story writer
- Mani Lal Bhaumik, Indian American physicist and an internationally bestselling author, entrepreneur and philanthropist
- Anil Kumar Gain, Indian statistician and Mathematician, founder of Vidyasagar University
- Samit Bhanja, famous Indian actor
- Abha Maiti, Indian politician and lawyer, minister of state for Industry in the Morarji Desai government
- Ashok Dinda, Indian cricketer turned politician
- Suryakant Tripathi, Indian poet, novelist, essayist and writer. One of the most significant poets of Hindi literature
- Rai Sahib Bipin Bihari Sasmal, Zamindar, educationist and politician
- Phulrenu Guha, educationist and politician
- Biswanath Mukherjee, Indian politician and leader of Communist Party of India, one of the founder members of AISF
- Paresh Maity, painter and Padma Shri and awardee 2014
- Jadugopal Mukherjee, Indian politician and revolutionary, one of the leaders of Jugantar group
- Somenath Maity, Indian artist famous for urban landscape paintings
- Bhupal Chandra Panda, Indian revolutionary and politician
- Biplab Roy Chowdhury, politician
- Ashutosh Kuila, Indian revolution, freedom fighter, famously martyred during the Quit India Movement
- Suvendu Adhikari, Politician, Chief Minister, West Bengal
