= Amin Suhrawardy =

Bengali judge (1859–1894)

- আমিন সোহরাওয়ার্দী

Sub Judge of Calcutta High Court
- In office 8 June 1887 – 5 August 1891

Personal details
- Born: 1 January 1859 Midnapore, Bengal Presidency, British India
- Died: 17 July 1894 (aged 35) Dhaka, Bengal Presidency, British India
- Spouse: Umme Khatun
- Children: Begum Badar un nissa Akhtar
- Parent: Ubaidullah Al Ubaidi Suhrawardy (father)
- Relatives: Suhrawardy family

Amin Suhrawardy was a Bengali judge, academic and a prominent sorcerer of his time. He served as the subordinate judge of Calcutta High Court from 1887 to 1891. He was a professor of law at Calcutta University. Amin also had a parallel career in the field of stage magic and is regarded as one of the pioneers of the field in Bengal.

== Biography ==
Amin Suhrawardy alias Aminuddin Al-Amin Suhrawardy was born into the English educated, well known and prominent Muslim family of Bengal, the Suhrawardy family. He was the youngest son of Ubaidullah Al Ubaidi Suhrawardy, a notable writer and scholar, who contributed significantly to the Bengali Renaissance movement; and his second wife, Syeda Shamsunnihar Begum, whose father, Syed Hafiz Hossein, was the then deputy magistrate of Midnapur district. Amin was the half brother of Abdullah Al-Mamun Suhrawardy, a scholar and a writer; Hassan Suhrawardy, a surgeon and the first Muslim vice chancellor of Calcutta University; Khujista Akhtar Banu, a writer and a socialite; and Mehmood Suhrawardy. His full brother, Habib ur Rahman Suhrawardy was a Sufi mystic, who attempted to carry forward the family's spiritual legacy, but died untimely at the young age of 19. Chief Justice Abdur Rahim was Amin's maternal first cousin, while Zahid Suhrawardy was his paternal first cousin.

He matriculated from Midnapore Collegiate School. Amin then attended Calcutta Madrasa and then Calcutta University from where he graduated in law. Amin taught law at Calcutta University as a professor for a good number of years. He then began his legal practice, beginning his career as a pleader in Midnapore sessions court. Amin later joined the bar and practiced as a lawyer at Calcutta High Court, after which he was promoted to the rank of subordinate judge in 1887.

Amin was married to Begum Umme Khatun, a sister of Yusufuddin Ahmed, the chief executive engineer of the PWD department in Bengal Presidency. Her family was a prominent land owning family of Chitwa, Burdwan and Midnapore with roots in Komarpur and Faridpur. Umme Khatun's first cousins included Khan Bahadur Kabiruddin Ahmed, the father of Humayun Kabir, the third Education Minister of India. While, Umme Khatun's nephew's daughter married Muhammad Qudrat-i-Khuda's son.

Amin also emerged to be a prominent sorcerer of his time, something which his family never approved of. He was very passionate about magic and was drawn towards the field from his childhood. Amin had learned tricks from Jawaharlal Dhar. He subsequently befriended Ganapati Chakraborty, who was exactly of Amin's age. They performed tricks in Calcutta and earned a lot of fame.
