= Ibrahim Suhrawardy =

Indian teacher and linguist (1896-1972)

Syed Ibrahim Al-Qadri Suhrawardy
- Born: 16 January 1896; Balasore, Bengal Presidency, British India
- Died: 20 May 1971 (aged 75); Balasore, Odisha, India
- Education: St. Xavier's Collegiate School, Calcutta Madrasa
- Occupations: Teacher, linguist
- Organization: Mohammedan Literary Society
- Notable work: Khabardaar vol i, Khabardaar vol ii
- Spouses: Sahibzadi Syeda Ehsana Akhtar, Syeda Nahida Begum
- Parent: Qazi Syed Abdul Sattar Al-Qadri
- Relatives: Abdullah Al-Mamun Suhrawardy (uncle); Hassan Suhrawardy (uncle); Begum Badar un nissa Akhtar (cousin); Afzal-ul Amin (son in law)
- Family: Suhrawardy family

Ibrahim Suhrawardy (16 January 1896 – 20 May 1971) was an Indian educationist, author and linguist from Balasore, Odisha. He is credited to have written the first English grammar books in Odia for the native students. He achieved high distinction in English studies in British India and taught many generations of students and scholars how western languages could be pursued to great educational advantage. Ibrahim was also the first muslim from Orissa province to have qualified the prestigious Indian Civil Services Examinations in 1921. He was one of the active Satyagrahis during the Inchudi Satyagraha movement in 1930.

== Family and education ==
Qazi Syed Ibrahim Khalil Ullah Alqadri Suhrawardy was born into the Qadi family of Balasore to Qazi Syed Abdul Sattar Alqadri and his wife Muner un nisa Akhtar. From his father's side he was a direct descendant of the Persian theologian Abdul Qadir Jilani. His father was the Mukhtar of Balasore, while his mother, Begum Muner un nisa was the first cousin of Abdullah Al-Mamun Suhrawardy and Hassan Suhrawardy. Ibrahim was brought up in his maternal home. He attended school at St. Xavier's Collegiate School in Calcutta and later finished his intermediate education from Calcutta Madrasa. He then finally earned a graduation degree in from Ravenshaw College.

== Career ==
Ibrahim joined as a teacher in Calcutta Madrasa in the Anglo Persian department. He was then appointed as the headmaster of Beadaon Madrasa in 1919. Ibrahim became the first muslim from Orissa province to qualify the prestigious Indian Civil Services Examinations in 1921, after which he was posted in Derhadun as a sub-divisional magistrate. Ibrahim later resigned from his post in response to Gandhiji's call for boycotting the posts of British government during the non-cooperation movement. He served as the headmaster of George High School, Sambalpur from 1928 to 1934. Ibrahim later joined the nationalist movement and remained a close associate of Raja Baikuntha Nath Dey.

He realised that the native Odia students faced a lot difficulties in understanding the nuances of English language as it was completely alien to them. Thus he wrote and published English grammar books in Odia in order to provide a better understanding of English language to the students. Both his books were included in the school curriculum of Puri Zilla School.

He was also a member of Mohammedan Literary Society. He had participated in the 1930 salt satyagraha at Inchudi led by Gopabandhu Choudhury and had extended a helping hand to the nationalist workers during the civil disobedience movement. In Balasore, Ibrahim started a library named Bazm e Ikhlaq meaning: An Assembly of Morality, he held daily gatherings in the library for ethical discourse.

=== Marriage ===
Suhrawardy married twice; firstly to Sahibzadi Syeda Ehsana Akhtar, the daughter of Umdatunnissa, Nawab Begum of Kharui and after her untimely death in 1932, he got remarried to Syeda Nahida Begum. Both his wives were the great granddaughters of Syed Shah Mehr Ali Alquadri Al Baghdadi, the famous Sufi saint of Bengal.

== Notable students ==
- Manmath Nath Das, minister
- Madhab Chandra Dash, ecologist
