= Vera Alexandrovna Tiscenko Calder =

Russian actress

Vera Alexandrovna Tiscenko (28 August 1902 – 13 October 1983) was a Russian actress of Polish descent and member of the Moscow Art Theatre who lived through four revolutions: the 1905 Russian Revolution, the Russian Revolution (1917), the Spanish Civil War, the Direct Action Day & Indian Independence Movement, and the Indo-Pakistani War of 1947 (also known as the First Kashmir War). In India, her divorce from her first husband, Eugene Tiscenko, has achieved the status of a constitutional precedent that has been deployed repeatedly by the Supreme Court of India. She was the second wife of Huseyn Shaheed Suhrawardy who was the last Prime Minister of Bengal until the Partition of India (April 1946- August 1947) and subsequently became the fifth Prime Minister of Pakistan (1956–1957). They had a son Robert Ashby, born as Rashid Suhrawardy, who worked in the British and American film industry.

== Life ==
The second of three sisters, she pursued acting as a child against her parents wishes and when she was 19 caught the attention of Olga Knipper (widow of Anton Chekov) who brought her to meet Constantin Stanislavski at the Moscow Art Theatre. She acted at the Moscow Art Theatre and in Prague. Always dynamic on stage she went on a European tour with Moscow Art Theatre actress Vera Baranovskaya, where she met the Russian émigré medical student Eugene Tiscenko who was then living in Berlin. They were married on 20 May 1931, and later settled in Madrid. After the outbreak of the Spanish Civil War the couple moved to Rome via Vienna where on 27 January 1937, she gave birth to a son, Oleg. In 1938 her husband went to Edinburgh, Scotland to qualify for a British medical degree. Vera's marriage to Eugene had not been not a happy one and left alone with her son in Mussolini's Rome she became increasingly worried about the surrounding European unrest. She decided to accept an invitation from Sir Hassan Suhrawardy, an eminent surgeon and uncle of her English professor and former director from the Moscow Art Theatre, Hasan Shahid Suhrawardy, to leave Europe with her son and stay with him in Calcutta, India.

== The Tiscenko decision ==
On 1 September 1938, they arrived in Calcutta and Hassan, a widower for a good many years, began to put the make on her. Vera promptly sought out his nephew, Huseyn, to put a stop to his advances and in Huseyn she found a colorful, brilliant and witty man; an Oxford graduate and prominent lawyer (Gray's Inn), and also a widower (his first wife Begum Niaz Fatima had died in 1922) who had recently been elected to the new Bengal Assembly in 1937. Vera, living in Calcutta with her son on her own earnings and without any support from her husband, found "relief and solace" in the teachings of Islam. She cabled her husband with the news of her conversion to Islam and requested that he accept the Islamic faith. Eugene, a Greek Orthodox replied that his religious convictions were unshakable and "refused absolutely" to change his faith and insisted that their son remain Greek Orthodox. Vera, who had changed her name to Begum Noor Jehan at her conversion on 27 June 1940, applied to the High Court of Calcutta on 5 August 1940, for a suit declaring dissolution of her marriage to Eugene Tiscenko. The Calcutta High Court originally declared that her marriage to Eugene was dissolved. Despite a subsequent appeal that left the case unresolved, she married Huseyn Shaheed Suhrawardy later in 1940 and they had one son, Rashid (aka Robert Ashby). One year later, on 19 December 1941, the Calcutta High Court overturned the dissolution of marriage. The "Tiscenko" decision came to affect the lives of women all over South Asia. A Polish woman who was married to a Russian man in Germany trying to dissolve her marriage before a court in Calcutta.

== Vera Vlasova ==
Following her divorce in 1951 from Suhrawardy, Vera, went to live in the New York City. Her younger sister, Lydia, was living in a Manhattan apartment building at 130 West 57th Street that her husband, Dr. David Jedwabnik had inherited from his brother, Abram, in 1949. Vera spent the rest of her life teaching acting lessons based on the Stanislavski's system under the pseudonym Vera Vlasova at her studio in her flat on Orchid Avenue in Hollywood. Her professional name, "Vlasova", was the name of Vera Baranovskaya's character in Mother, a film based on the novel by Maxim Gorky and directed by Vsevolod Pudovkin in 1926. For over twenty years she went on lecture tours around the world lecturing as the "Foremost authority on the Stanislavski Method". On 7 October 1983, Vera was at Los Angeles International Airport about to board a flight to New York City to visit her sister, Lydia, en route to give a lecture at the Moscow Art Theatre when she suffered a sudden stroke as she was arguing with the baggage handler about the treatment of her luggage. She died on 13 October 1983, in Los Angeles.
