= Khujista Akhtar Banu =

Indian writer, socialite, educationist and social reformer (1872–1912)

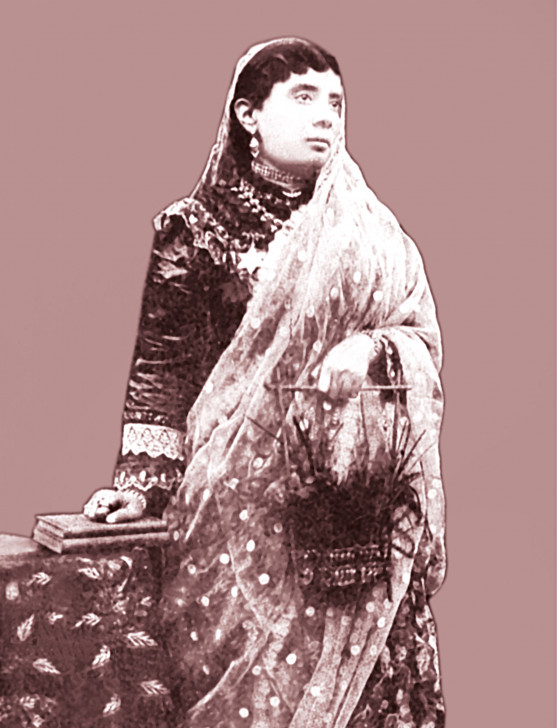
- Born: 11 October 1872; Midnapore, Bengal, British India
- Died: 12 January 1912 (aged 39); Calcutta, Bengal, British India
- Spouse: Zahid Suhrawardy
- Children: Hasan Shaheed Suhrawardy, Huseyn Shaheed Suhrawardy
- Father: Ubaidullah Al Ubaidi Suhrawardy
- Family: Suhrawardy family

Khujista Akhtar Banu Suhrawardiyya (also spelled as Khujastha Akhtar Banu), popularly known as Suhrawardy Begum, was a late 19th-century writer, Bengali socialite, educationist, and social reformer. Khujista was the first Indian woman to pass the Senior Cambridge examinations, in the year 1887. She was also the first Indian woman to be appointed as an examiner by the prestigious Calcutta University. She was the mother of Huseyn Shaheed Suhrawardy, the former Prime Minister of Bengal.

== Early life and education ==
Khujista Akhtar was born into the illustrious Suhrawardy family of Bengal in 1872 as the eldest daughter of Ubaidullah Al Ubaidi Suhrawardy and his wife, Makbullan nissa Begum. She was thus a direct descendant of Shihab al-Din 'Umar al-Suhrawardi and Bahauddin Zakariya Suhrawardi. Khujista's grandfather, Shah Aminuddin Suhrawardy, is reckoned to be the last Sufi Pir of the Suhrawardiyya order in Bengal. Her brothers include Abdullah Al-Mamun Suhrawardy and Hassan Suhrawardy.

Like many of her female forebears in the family, she too was homeschooled in her early years, mostly because there were no schools for girls at that time. She learned Persian, Arabic, English, and Urdu from her father. She later graduated with honours in mathematics and Persian literature from the Indian Board of Examinations in the year 1887. After finishing her senior Cambridge, she was appointed as an examiner for Urdu literature by Calcutta University; she was the only Indian woman to have received this honour at that time.

== Career ==
Khujista was determined to educate and uplift the Indian masses; hence, she entered into the domain of social work. As a writer, she wrote the famous book "Aaina e Ibrat", which was approved by Calcutta University and was incorporated in the syllabus for all its affiliated colleges.

In 1909, she founded the Suhrawardia Girls School in Calcutta. The school was inaugurated by Lady Minto Anna Maria Amyand, the wife of the former Viceroy of India, Gilbert Elliot-Murray-Kynynmound, 1st Earl of Minto, better known as Lord Minto.

Khujista empathized with the poor and hence used to visit the slums very often to educate the underprivileged people about health and sanitation, given that epidemics like cholera and influenza were in the wake at that time.

== Marriage and family ==
Khujista was married to her first cousin, Zahid Suhrawardy, a jurist who served as a judge in the Calcutta High Court. The couple gave birth to two sons

- Huseyn Shaheed Suhrawardy, a lawyer and politician who later became the 3rd prime minister of Bengal and the 5th prime minister of Pakistan
- Hasan Shaheed Suhrawardy, a writer and a linguist.

== Death ==
Khujista died on 12 January 1919, after she caught influenza during one of her visits to the slums of Calcutta.
