= Robert Ashby =

British actor (1940–2019)

- Born: Rashid Suhrawardy; 1940; London, England, UK
- Died: 7 February 2019 (aged 79); London, England, UK
- Education: University of Oxford
- Occupation: Actor
- Parents: Huseyn Shaheed Suhrawardy (father); Vera Alexandrovna Tiscenko Calder (mother)
- Relatives: Begum Akhtar Sulaiman (sister)

Rashid Suhrawardy (1940 – 7 February 2019), known professionally as Robert Ashby, was a British actor. He worked on stage, television and film.

== Early life and career ==
Ashby was born in London 1940 as Rashid Suhrawardy to East Pakistani Bengali politician Huseyn Shaheed Suhrawardy, who served as the Prime Minister of Pakistan, and a Russian mother of Polish descent, actress Vera Alexandrovna Tiscenko Calder.

He received his early education at Charterhouse School and graduated from the University of Oxford. He attended the Royal Academy of Dramatic Art in London and later joined the Royal Shakespeare Company. Described by Pakistan Today as "the quintessential theatre actor", on screen he was known for playing Jawaharlal Nehru in the film Jinnah (1998) and a Doctor Who villain, the Borad, in the serial Timelash (1985).

== Politics ==
In politics, Ashby was deeply committed to the people of Bangladesh. Where Hussain Shaheed Suhrawardy's daughter, Begum Akhtar Suleiman, went out on a limb to support the Yahya Khan regime during the Bangladesh Liberation War of 1971, Robert Ashby loudly upheld the Bangladesh cause in London. As described by a friend in an obituary, it was “patriotism par excellence”. As a result of that, he had a strained relationship with his sisters and other relatives who were in favour of united Pakistan. He was invited to join politics in Bangladesh but declined, citing his language issues and saying that he was "not as great as his father". However, he headed Awami League's election steering committee in 1996. Prime Minister Sheikh Hasina expressed her "profound shock and sorrow" at the news of his death.
