= Huseyn Suhrawardy =

Prime Minister of Pakistan from 1956 to 1957

Huseyn Shaheed Suhrawardy
- হোসেন শহীদ সোহরাওয়ার্দী; حسین شہید سہروردی
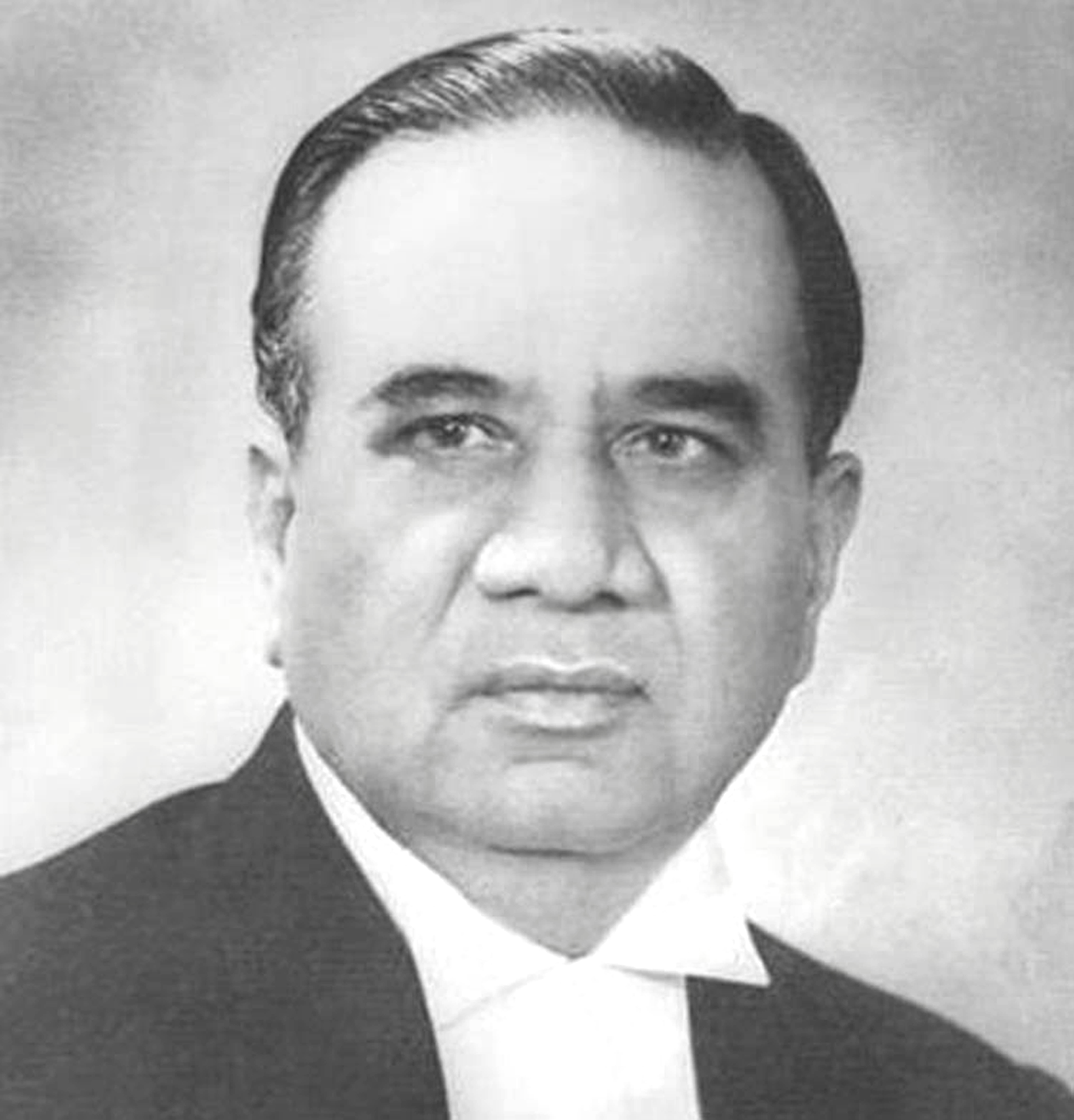
- Formal portrait, c. 1945

5th Prime Minister of Pakistan
- In office 12 September 1956 – 17 October 1957
- President: Iskandar Ali Mirza
- Preceded by: Chaudhry Mohammad Ali
- Succeeded by: I. I. Chundrigar

3rd Leader of the Opposition of Pakistan
- In office 7 July 1955 – 11 September 1956
- Leader: Mohammad Ali Bogra; Chaudhri Muhammad Ali
- Preceded by: Dhirendranath Datta
- Succeeded by: I. I. Chundrigar

3rd Prime Minister of Bengal
- In office 23 April 1946 – 15 August 1947
- Monarch: George VI
- Governors General: Earl Wavell; Earl Mountbatten
- Preceded by: Sir Khawaja Nazimuddin
- Succeeded by: Position abolished (Khawaja Nazimuddin as Chief Minister of East Bengal) (Prafulla Chandra Ghosh as Premier of West Bengal)

President of Pakistan Awami League
- In office 27 July 1956 – 10 October 1957
- General Secretary: Sheikh Mujibur Rahman
- Preceded by: Abdul Hamid Khan Bhashani
- Succeeded by: Abdur Rashid Tarkabagish

Personal details
- Born: 8 September 1892 Midnapore, Bengal Presidency, British India
- Died: 5 December 1963 (aged 71) Beirut, Lebanon
- Cause of death: Cardiac arrest
- Resting place: Mausoleum of Three Leaders
- Citizenship: British India (1892–1947); Pakistani (1947–1963)
- Party: National Democratic Front (1962–1963)
- Other political affiliations: All-Pakistan Awami League (1950–1958); Pakistan Muslim League (1947–1949); All-India Muslim League (1926–1947); Swaraj Party (1922–1926)
- Spouse(s): Begum Niaz Fatima (m. 1920; died 1922) Vera Alexandrovna Tiscenko Calder (m. 1940; div. 1951)
- Children: Begum Akhtar Sulaiman (daughter); Rashid Suhrawardy (son)
- Parents: Zahid Suhrawardy (father); Khujastha Akhtar Banu (mother)
- Relatives: Suhrawardy family, Hasan Shaheed Suhrawardy (brother); Shaista Suhrawardy Ikramullah (cousin); Naz Ikramullah (cousin); Salma Sobhan (cousin); Princess Sarvath El Hassan (cousin); Shahida Jamil (granddaughter)
- Education: Calcutta University (BS in Maths, MA in Arabic lang.); St Catherine's College, Oxford (MA in Polysci and BCL)
- Profession: Lawyer, politician

Huseyn Shaheed Suhrawardy (Note: Bengali: হোসেন শহীদ সোহরাওয়ার্দী, romanized: Hōsēn Śôhīd Sōhrāōẏārdī, pronounced [ˈɦoˌsen ˈʃoɦiːd ˈsoɦˌraˌwaɾdi] Urdu: حسین شہید سہروردی, romanized: Hussain Śahīd Suhrvardī, pronounced [ɦʊˈseːn ʃəˈhiːd soːɦrəˈʋərdi]) (8 September 1892 – 5 December 1963) was a Pakistani politician and statesman who served as the fifth prime minister of Pakistan from 1956 to 1957 and before that as the prime minister of Bengal from 1946 to 1947. He is regarded as a patron of a Two-Nation Theory for the creation of Pakistan, for which he is revered as one of the leading founding member of Pakistan; and also as the pioneer of the Bengali civil rights movement in Bangladesh. Also he was the political mentor of Bangladesh's founding president, Sheikh Mujibur Rahman.

Born in 1892 at Midnapore, Bengal, Suhrawardy was a scion of one of Bengal's most prominent Muslim families, the Suhrawardys. He studied law at the University of Oxford, and joined the independence movement during the 1920s as a trade union leader in Calcutta, initially associated with the Swaraj Party. He joined the All-India Muslim League and became one of the leaders of its Bengal branch. Suhrawardy was elected to the Bengal Legislative Assembly in 1937 and led the Muslim League to decisively win the 1946 provincial general election in Bengal, serving as the last prime minister of Bengal until the partition of India. His premiership was notable for his proposal to create a separate and united Bengal — supported by the Muslim League but opposed by the Indian National Congress — and failing to prevent the Great Calcutta Killings. In 1947, the Bengal Assembly voted to partition the province. Suhrawardy briefly remained in India after partition to attend to his ailing father and manage his family's property. He eventually moved to Pakistan and divided his time between Karachi (Pakistan's federal capital) and Dhaka (capital of East Pakistan).

In Dhaka, Suhrawardy emerged as the leader of the Bengali-dominated Awami League which became the principal opposition party to the Pakistan Muslim League. In 1956, the Awami League formed a coalition government with the Republican Party to unseat the Muslim League. Suhrawardy became prime minister in the coalition government, forging stronger ties with the United States by leading Pakistan's diplomacy in SEATO and CENTO. He also became the first Pakistani premier to travel to Communist China. His pro-US foreign policy caused a split in the Awami League in East Pakistan, with Maulana Bhashani forming the break-away pro-Maoist National Awami Party. Suhrawardy's premiership lasted for a year. His central cabinet included figures like Feroz Khan Noon as foreign minister and Abul Mansur Ahmad as trade minister. Sheikh Mujibur Rahman was considered Suhrawardy's chief political protégé.

Suhrawardy was premier under Pakistan's first republican constitution. The Noakhali riots also saw the genocide of Bengali Hindus during which Suhrawardy tried to keep the news of the atrocities from the media and for either planning the massacre or failing to take action to stop it. During the 1958 military coup, Suhrawardy was arrested by the military government, due to which he missed the wedding of his niece, Salma Sobhan, Pakistan's first woman barrister. He founded the National Democratic Front in 1962 as a political alliance to oppose the military regime of Ayub Khan but died one year later in Beirut due to a heart attack. After his death, the Awami League veered towards Bengali nationalism and launched the 6-point movement, ultimately leading to a civil war in East Pakistan and secession of Bangladesh from Pakistan in 1971.

Suhrawardy is also remembered for his role as the minister for civil supply during the Bengal famine of 1943. In India's West Bengal, he is seen as the Butcher of Bengal and mastermind behind the Direct Action Day; directly responsible for the 1946 Calcutta killings. Suhrawardy's only daughter Begum Akhtar Sulaiman was a social worker and activist in Pakistan; his son, Rashid Suhrawardy, from his second marriage to Vera Alexandrovna Tiscenko Calder, was a British actor known for his role in the film Jinnah. His brother Hasan Shaheed Suhrawardy was a diplomat, writer and art-critic. Many places in South Asia bear his name, including an avenue in Islamabad, a large park near his mausoleum in Dhaka, and streets, dormitories and memorials across Bangladesh. The Suhrawardy family home in Kolkata has been leased as a library and information centre to the Bangladesh High Commission in India by the city's waqf board.

== Family and early life ==
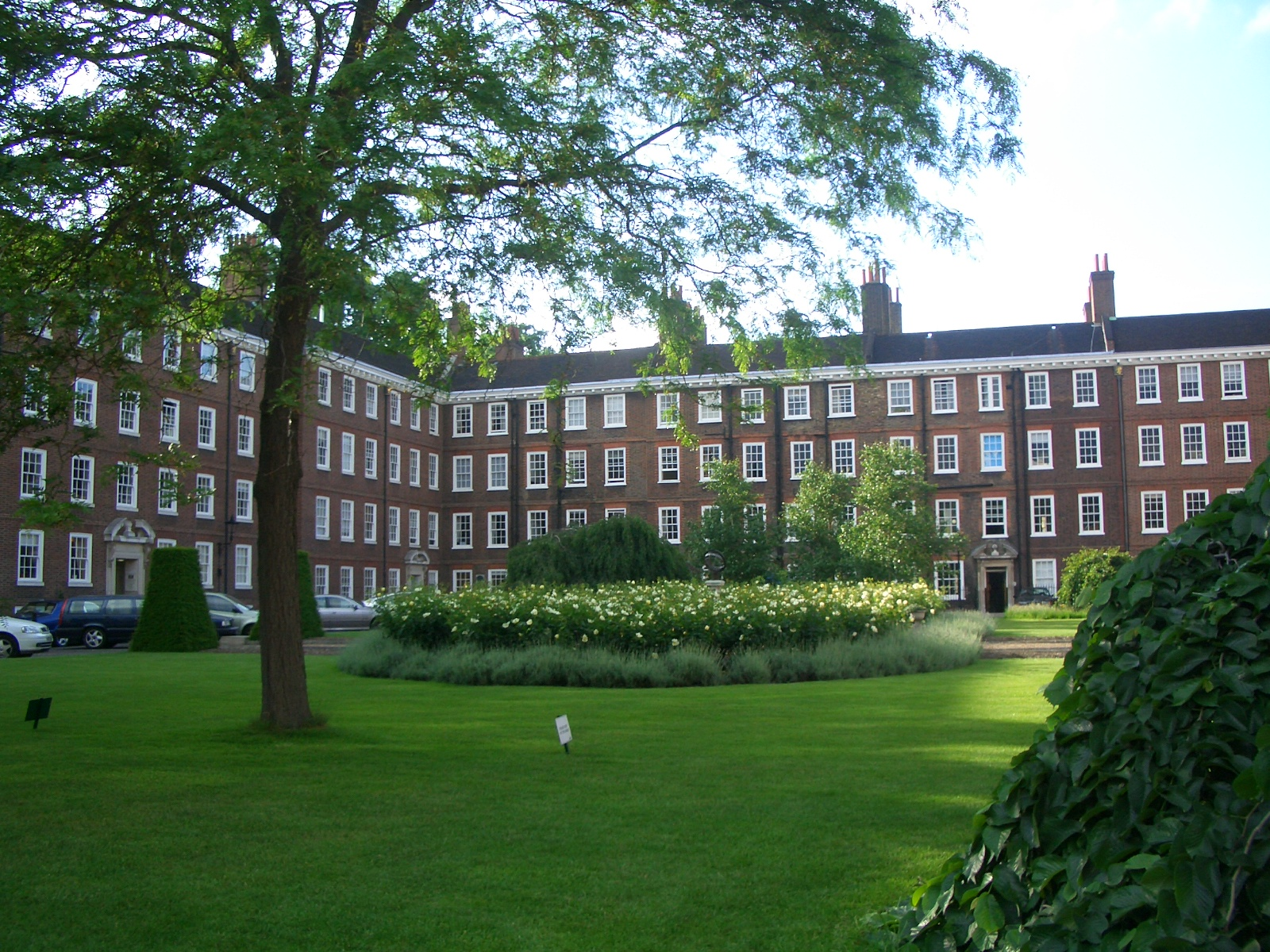
Suhrawardy was called to the Bar of England and Wales at Gray's Inn

The Suhrawardy family are regarded as one of the illustrious families of the Indian subcontinent. Claiming themselves as descendants of the first caliph of Islam, the Suhrawardy lineage is traced to Shihab al-Din 'Umar al-Suhrawardi, a Sufi who lived in Baghdad during the 12th century. The Suhrawardiyya order is one of the major Sunni orders of Sufism. His grandfather, Ubaidullah Al-Ubaidi Suhrawardy, was a Dhaka-based Sufi leader of the Bengali Renaissance and is buried beside Lalbagh Fort. His father Justice Sir Zahid Suhrawardy was a judge of the Calcutta High Court. His brother Hasan Shaheed Suhrawardy was a linguist, poet, art-critic and diplomat. His uncles included Lieutenant Colonel Hassan Suhrawardy and Sir Abdullah Al-Mamun Suhrawardy. His cousin Shaista Suhrawardy Ikramullah was one of South Asia's pioneering women in public service. His first wife was Begum Niaz Fatima, the daughter of Justice Sir Abdur Rahim, a member of the Governor's Executive Council and Speaker of the Central Legislative Assembly. Begum Niaz Fatima died in 1922. His second wife was Begum Vera Suhrawardy, a Russian actress of Polish descent.

A young Huseyn studied in Calcutta Madrasa and attended St. Xavier's College, Kolkata where he earned a Bachelor of Science degree. Both Huseyn and his elder brother Hasan studied in St Catherine's College, Oxford. They entertained themselves with D. H. Lawrence, Robert Trevelyn, Bertrand Russell, Hugh Kingsmill, Basanta Kumar Mullick, Kiran Shankar Roy, Apurba Chanda, Sri Prakash, S K Gupta, Surendra Kumar Sen, and Syud Hossain. The elder Suhrawardy (Hasan) was in Oxford when Bengali poet Rabindranath Tagore became the first Asian to win a Nobel Prize in 1913. His brother Hasan later recounted that "it is difficult now for me to recapture the elation and the ecstasy of those days, but I remember distinctly that look of awe which was in my landlady's eyes when she brought in the breakfast with the morning newspaper containing the scoop". Suhrawardy obtained further degrees, including a Bachelor of Civil Law from Oxford and a Master of Arts in Arabic from Calcutta. Suhrawardy became a barrister. He was called to the Bar of England and Wales through Gray's Inn in 1922–23.

His first son Shahab died of pneumonia. His second son Rashid Suhrawardy was a British theatre actor. Rashid starred in the film Jinnah along with Christopher Lee. His granddaughter Shahida Jamil served as Pakistan's law minister. His nieces include Princess Sarvath al-Hassan of the Hashemite Kingdom of Jordan; the late Bangladeshi barrister Salma Sobhan; and the film-maker Naz Ikramullah.

== Early political career (1924-1937) ==
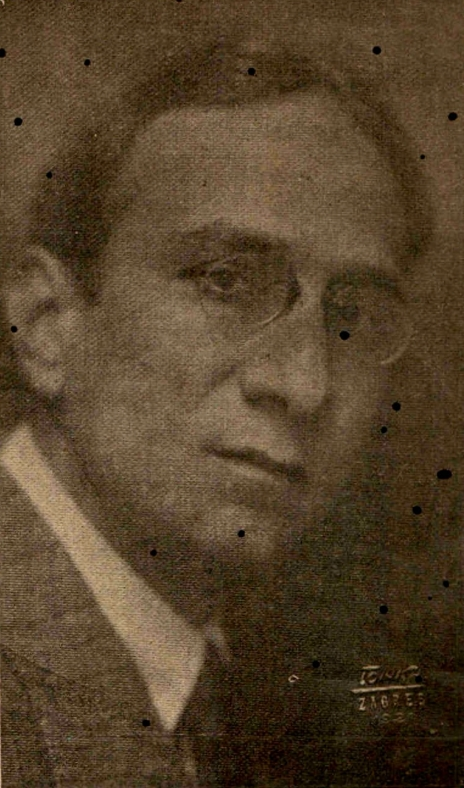
Suhrawardy, 1922

=== Political organizer ===
Suhrawardy was credited as a pioneering modern political organizer in Bengal. He created 36 trade unions among sailors, railway employees, jute and cotton mills workers, rickshaw pullers, cart drivers and other working class groups dominated by Bengali Muslims.

=== Deputy Mayor of Calcutta (1924-1926) ===
Suhrawardy joined the Swaraj Party led by Bengali Hindu secularist C. R. Das in 1923. He became the Deputy Mayor of Calcutta in 1924. After the death of Das, Suhrawardy turned to Indian Muslim nationalism. He emerged as a leader of the Bengal Provincial Muslim League (BPML), the provincial wing of the Muslim League which his father Zahid had earlier helped create in 1912.

=== Bengali Muslim groups ===
Suhrawardy formed several Bengali Muslim political groups, including the Calcutta Khilafat Committee during the 1920s amid the dissolution of the Ottoman caliphate and the Turkish War of Independence; the Bengal Muslim Election Board; the United Muslim Party; and the Independent Muslim Party.

== Bengal Legislative Assembly and WWII (1937-1945) ==
In 1937, Suhrawardy was elected to the newly formed Bengal Legislative Assembly. He was appointed Minister of Commerce and Labor in the cabinet of the 1st Prime Minister of Bengal A. K. Fazlul Huq. In 1940, the Lahore Resolution was adopted by Indian Muslim leaders calling for the creation of independent states in eastern and northwestern India; it was unclear if the resolution implied a single state covering the two Muslim-majority regions of India or multiple states. Suhrawardy served as Minister of Civil Supplies in the cabinet of the 2nd prime minister of Bengal Sir Khawaja Nazimuddin. According to author Thomas Keneally, Suhrawardy blamed black marketers and the central government in New Delhi for the Bengal famine of 1943 during World War II, and claimed he worked tirelessly on relief. Viceroy Lord Wavell, however, believed that Suhrawardy was corrupt, that he "siphoned money from every project that was undertaken to ease the famine, and awarded to his associates contracts for warehousing, the sale of grain to governments, and transportation." On the other hand, Indian author, Madhushree Mukherjee, laid major responsibility of this famine to British prime minister Winston Churchill who wanted the ration for war efforts only and had refrained the U.S. aid to Bengal. Suhrawardy was further accused of practising a Scorched-Earth Policy to counter the Japanese Army's advances in the East and supervised to burn thousand fishing boats to block any potential movement of invading Japanese Army troops. These measures aggravated starvation and famine and the relief was only ordered when Lord Wavell became the Viceroy, using the Indian Army to organise relief. However, by that time, the winter crop had arrived and famine conditions had already eased, after millions had earlier perished. Calcutta's Hindu-owned newspapers had become very critical of his role and the Bengali Hindus held him directly responsible for the famine.

== Prime Minister of Bengal (1946-1947) ==
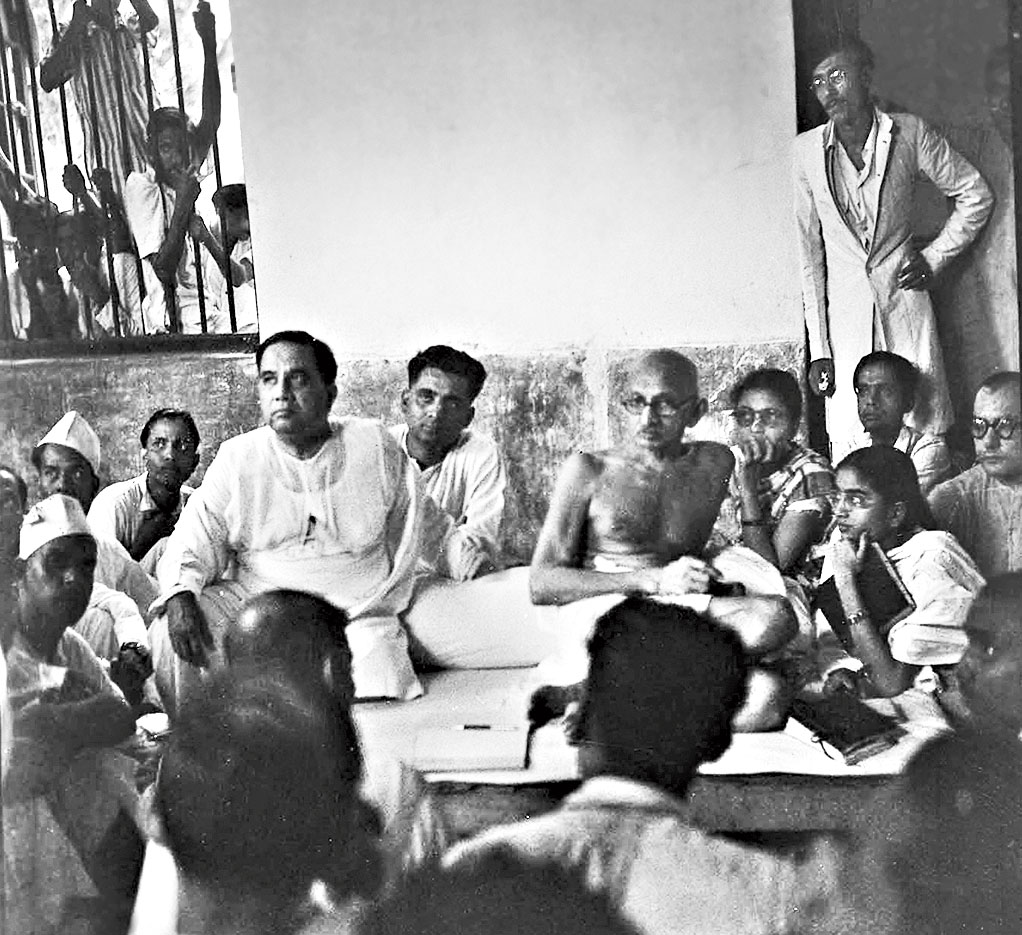
Suhrawardy and Mahatma Gandhi in Noakhali before the partition of India. A young Sheikh Mujib looks on

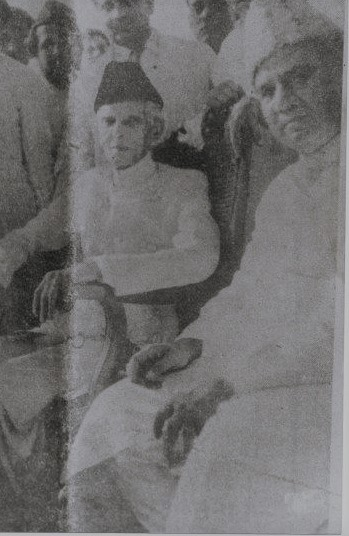
Suhrawardy and Jinnah at a rally in Calcutta, 1946

During the 1946 general election, Suhrawardy led the Bengal Provincial Muslim League (BPML) to a decisive victory. The Muslim League's biggest success was in Bengal where out of 119 seats for Muslims, the BPML won 113. Suhrawardy was supported by the League's chief Muhammad Ali Jinnah to assume the premiership of Bengal. Suhrawardy's cabinet included himself as home minister; Mohammad Ali of Bogra as finance, health and local government minister; Syed Muazzemuddin Hossain as education minister; Ahmed Hossain as agriculture, forest and fisheries minister; Nagendra Nath Roy as judicial and legislative minister; Abul Fazal Muhammad Abdur Rahman as cooperatives and irrigation Minister; Abul Gofran as civil supplies minister; Tarak Nath Mukherjee as waterways minister; Fazlur Rahman as land minister; and Dwarka Nath Barury as works minister.

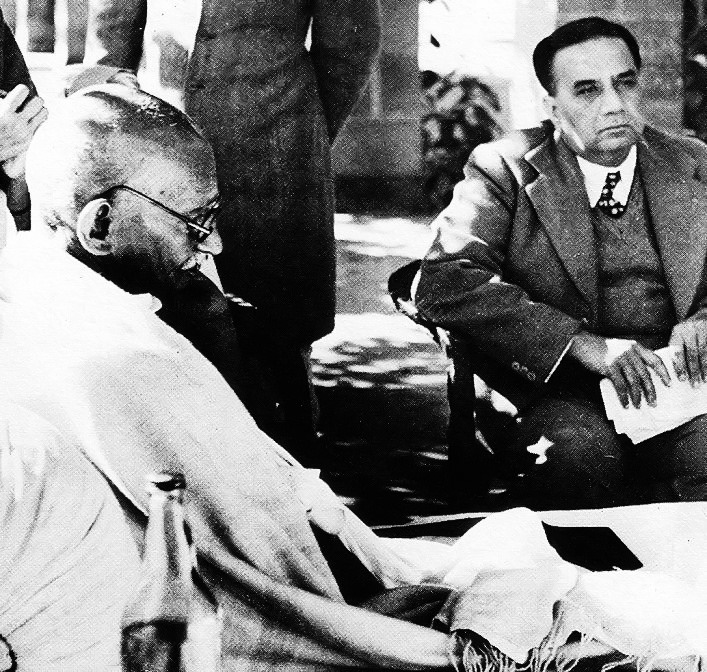
Suhrawardy and Gandhi

=== Direct Action riots ===
Suhrawardy's tenure as premier saw the Great Calcutta Killings in 1946. The Muslim League called a strike to press its demand for the creation of Pakistan. The strike degenerated into brutal and widespread Hindu-Muslim riots in which thousands were killed on both sides. The riots were seen by some as the last nail in the coffin for Hindu-Muslim unity in British India.

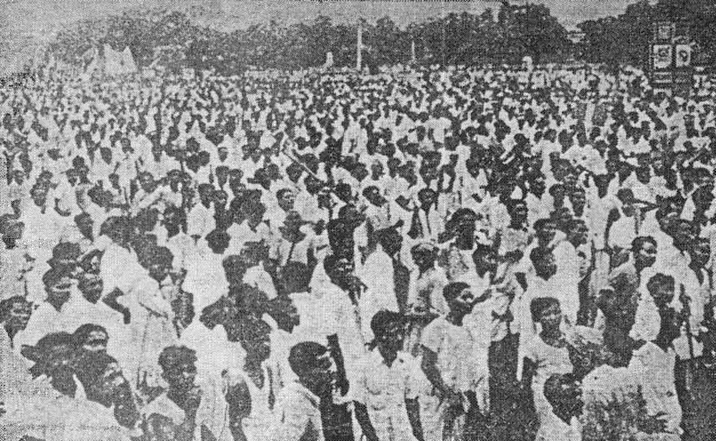
The crowd at the Muslim League rally at the Maidan.

Troubles started on the morning of 16 August. Even before 10 o'clock Police Headquarters at Lalbazar had reported that there was excitement throughout the city, that shops were being forced to close, and that there were many reports of brawls, stabbing and throwing of stones and brickbats. These were mainly concentrated in the North-central parts of the city like Rajabazar, Kelabagan, College Street, Harrison Road, Colootolla and Burrabazar. In these areas the Hindus were in a majority and were also in a superior and powerful economic position. The trouble had assumed the communal character which it was to retain throughout.

The meeting began around 2 pm though processions of Muslims from all parts of Calcutta had started assembling since the midday prayers. A large number of the participants were reported to have been armed with iron bars and lathis (bamboo sticks). The numbers attending were estimated by a Central Intelligence Officer's reporter at 30,000 and by a Special Branch Inspector of Calcutta Police at 500,000. The latter figure is impossibly high and the Star of India reporter put it at about 100,000. The main speakers were Sir Khawaja Nazimuddin and Chief Minister Huseyn Shaheed Suhrawardy. Khwaja Nazimuddin in his speech preached peacefulness and restraint but spoilt the effect and flared up the tensions by stating that till 11 o'clock that morning all the injured persons were Muslims, and the Muslim community had only retaliated in self-defence.

The Special Branch of Calcutta Police had sent only one shorthand reporter to the meeting, with the result that no transcript of the chief minister's speech is available. But the Central Intelligence Officer and a reporter, who Frederick Burrows believed was reliable, deputed by the military authorities agree on one statement (not reported at all by the Calcutta Police). The version in the former's report was—"He [the Chief Minister] had seen to police and military arrangements who would not interfere". The version of the latter's was—"He had been able to restrain the military and the police". However, the police did not receive any specific order to "hold back". So, whatever Suhrawardy may have meant to convey by this, the impression of such a statement on a largely uneducated audience is construed by some to be an open invitation to disorder indeed, many of the listeners are reported to have started attacking Hindus and looting Hindu shops as soon as they left the meeting. Subsequently, there were reports of lorries (trucks) that came down Harrison Road in Calcutta, carrying hardline Muslim gangsters armed with brickbats and bottles as weapons and attacking Hindu-owned shops.

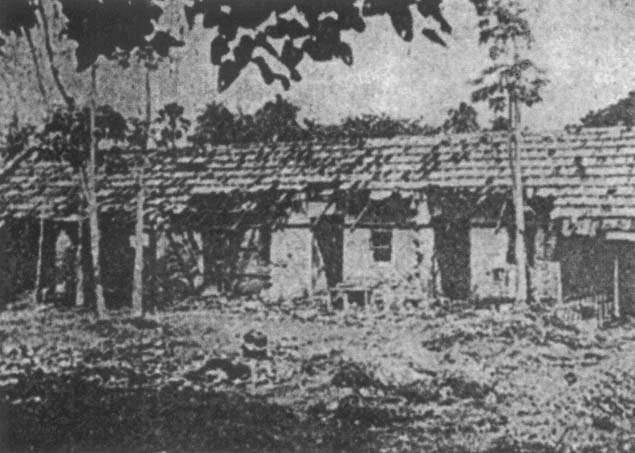
More than 300 Oriya labourers of Kesoram Cotton Mills were massacred in the slums of Lichubagan, Metiabruz.

A 6 pm curfew was imposed in the parts of the city where there had been rioting. At 8 pm forces were deployed to secure main routes and conduct patrols from those arteries, thereby freeing up police for work in the slums and the other underdeveloped sections.

=== United Bengal plan ===
In New Delhi on 27 April 1947, Suhrawardy called a press conference to demand an undivided, independent Bengal. Suhrawardy made an impassioned plea for setting aside religious differences in order to create an "independent, undivided, and sovereign Bengal". He opposed the British government's plan to partition India's most populous province; he was supported by the Governor of Bengal Frederick Burrows, Sarat Chandra Bose of the Indian National Congress, Kiran Shankar Roy of the Congress Parliamentary Party, Satya Ranjan Bakshi, Secretary of the Bengal Provincial Muslim League Abul Hashim, Bengal Finance Minister Mohammad Ali Chaudhury, Bengal Revenue Minister Fazlur Rahman and Tippera politician Ashrafuddin Chowdhury. Suhrawardy stated the following:-

Let us pause for a moment to consider what Bengal can be if it remains united. It will be a great country, indeed the richest and the most prosperous in India capable of giving to its people a high standard of living, where a great people will be able to rise to the fullest height of their stature, a land that will truly be plentiful. It will be rich in agriculture, rich in industry and commerce and in course of time it will be one of the powerful and progressive states of the world. If Bengal remains united this will be no dream, no fantasy.

On 20 May 1947, a five-point plan was outlined for a "Free State of Bengal", echoing the legacy of the name of the Irish Free State. The plan was based on a confessionalist structure with power-sharing between Hindus and Muslims. It mirrored some of the confessionalist practices adopted in French Lebanon in 1926, where the positions of president and prime minister rotated among Muslims and Christians. The five-point plan stated that "On the announcement by His Majesty's Government that the proposal of the Free State of Bengal had been accepted and that Bengal would not be partitioned, the present Bengal Ministry would be dissolved. A new interim Ministry would be brought into being, consisting of an equal number of Muslims and Hindus (including Scheduled Caste Hindus) but excluding the Prime Minister. In this Ministry, the Prime Minister would be a Muslim and the Home Minister a Hindu. Pending the final emergence of a Legislature and a Ministry under the new constitutions, Hindus (including Scheduled Caste Hindus) and Muslims would have an equal share in the Services, including military and police. The Services would be manned by Bengalis. A Constituent Assembly composed of 30 persons, 16 Muslims and 14 non-Muslims, would be elected by Muslim and non-Muslim members of the Legislature respectively, excluding Europeans". The British government seriously considered of the option of an independent Bengal. British commercial interests in Bengal required safeguards. The United States was also briefed on the possibility of three countries emerging out of partition, including Pakistan, India, and Bengal. On 2 June 1947, British Prime Minister Clement Attlee informed the US Ambassador to the United Kingdom Lewis Williams Douglas that there was a "distinct possibility Bengal might decide against partition and against joining either Hindustan or Pakistan". Douglas cabled the State Department about the matter.

=== Partition of India ===
Suhrawardy's interview on Partition of India and Bengal.

On 20 June 1947, the Bengal Legislative Assembly met to vote on the partition of Bengal. At the preliminary joint session, the assembly decided by 126 votes to 90 that if it remained united it should join the Constituent Assembly of Pakistan. Later, a separate meeting of legislators from West Bengal decided by 58 votes to 21 that the province should be partitioned and that West Bengal should join the Constituent Assembly of India. In another separate meeting of legislators from East Bengal, it was decided by 106 votes to 35 that the province should not be partitioned and 107 votes to 34 that East Bengal should join Pakistan in the event of partition. Communal violence broke out across India, especially in the Punjab and Bengal's Noakhali district. Suhrawardy traveled to Noakhali with Mahatma Gandhi to restore order; Gandhi and Suhrawardy also had deliberations in Calcutta. After the transfer of power on 14–15 August 1947, Suhrawardy continued to remain in India for a few years where he attended to ailing members of his family. He eventually settled down in the Dominion of Pakistan, with residences in the federal capital Karachi and the provincial capital Dhaka. His cousin Begum Shaista Suhrawardy Ikramullah called for Pakistan's constituent assembly to convene in Dacca as East Bengal was home to the majority of Pakistan's population.

== Post-independence career ==
=== Awami League ===
Suhrawardy joined the Awami League, a party formed in 1949 to counter the erstwhile ruling Muslim League. Suhrawardy emerged as the centrist leader of the Awami League; while Maulana Bhashani represented more radical leftist factions. The Awami League was often allied with the centre-left Krishak Praja Party of A. K. Fazlul Huq. Suhrawardy's chief protégé in East Bengal was Sheikh Mujibur Rahman, to whom Suhrawardy delegated political responsibilities.

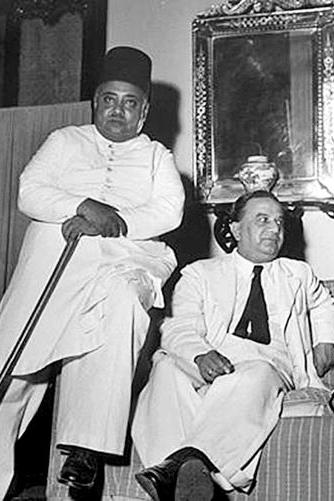
Suhrawardy and Sir Khawaja Nazimuddin in Karachi, 1950s

=== Law Minister of Pakistan ===
Suhrawardy was appointed law minister in 1953 in the cabinet of Prime Minister Mohammad Ali Bogra. He was in charge of drafting Pakistan's constitution.

=== United Front ===
One of the highlights of Suhrawardy's political career was leading the United Front campaign during the 1954 East Bengali election which booted the Muslim League out of power.

=== Leader of the Opposition ===
At the federal level, Suhrawardy served as Leader of the Opposition in the parliament of Pakistan in 1955. His position was bolstered by the landslide victory in East Bengal in 1954.

== Premiership (1956–1957) ==
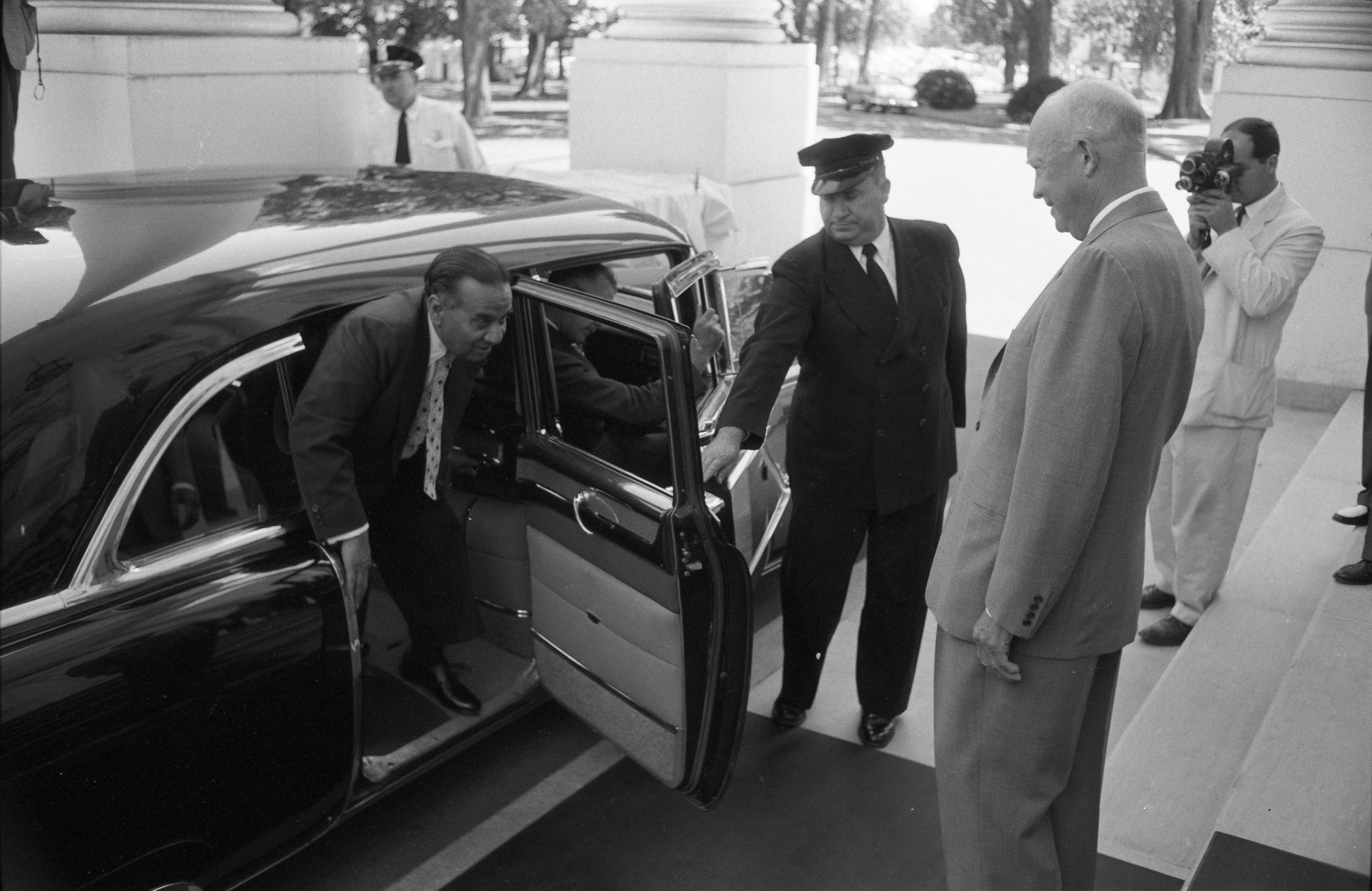
Suhrawardy being received by Dwight D. Eisenhower at the White House

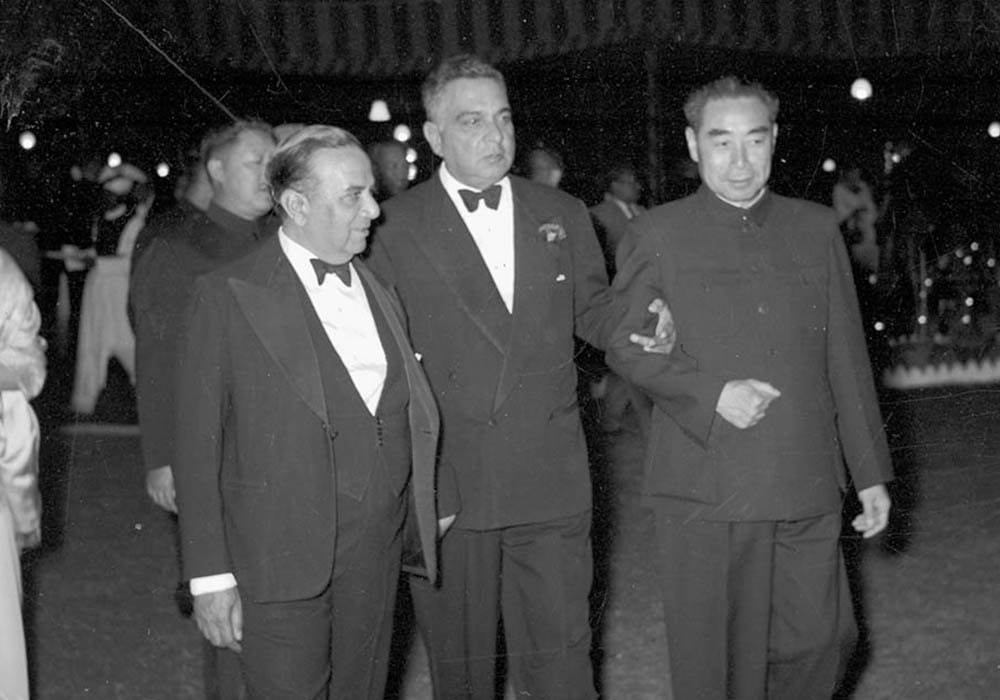
Suhrawardy with Iskander Mirza and Zhou Enlai

In 1956, the Awami League formed a coalition with Pakistan's Republican Party to unseat the previous government. Suhrawardy became the fifth Prime Minister of Pakistan and the second premier under the 1956 Constitution of Pakistan. Suhrawardy was known as a pro-American politician. He also cultivated pragmatic ties with Communist China. Suhrawardy supported the American-led Southeast Asia Treaty Organization (SEATO) and the Central Treaty Organization (CENTO). He was not keen on nonalignment which was strongly pursued by neighboring India. Suhrawardy toured the United States, was hosted by President Eisenhower at the White House, and met with American movie stars in Hollywood. In domestic policy, Suhrawardy addressed issues of nuclear energy, foreign aid utilization, food policy, the One Unit framework, and building up the military. His staunchly pro-Western foreign policy was opposed by Bengali radicals led by Maulana Bhashani who caused a split in the Awami League. However, Suhrawardy was elected as President of the Awami League. His cabinet included Feroz Khan Noon and Abul Mansur Ahmed among others.

=== One Unit ===
Initially promising to review the One Unit framework in the 1956 constitution, Prime Minister Suhrwardy later backtracked. At the National Assembly, Prime Minister Suhrawardy faced pressure from provincialists over the One Unit. West Pakistani provincialists wanted to restore the previous four provinces of Sind, Balochistan, Punjab and the North West Frontier Province. Large rallies were held in West Pakistan against the One Unit. Prime Minister Suhrawardy, however, did not pay attention to the issue. While East Pakistanis also objected to the One Unit for renaming East Bengal as East Pakistan, opposition among ethnic groups to the One Unit was stronger in West Pakistan.

=== Joint electorate ===
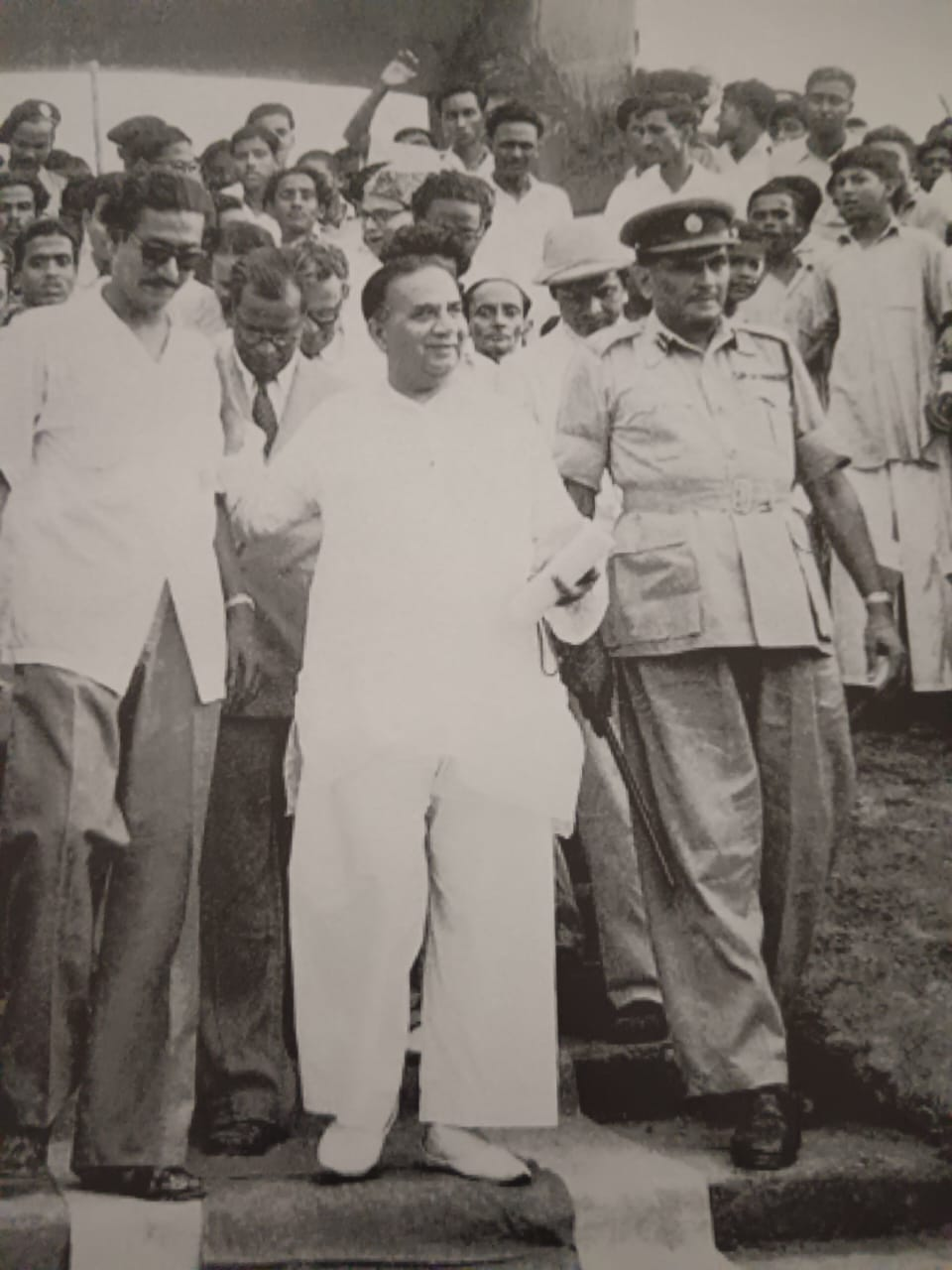
Mujib and Suhrawardy in 1954

Suhrawardy's one-year tenure was unable to introduce the joint electorate. Since 1932, elections in Pakistan's provinces were held under the "separate electorate" system of dividing seats in parliament among religious groups in accordance with the colonial-era Communal Award. Abolishing the joint electorate was a key demand of the Awami League. At the National Assembly, the Awami League initiated constitutional reforms to restore the joint electorate system but faced opposition from the Muslim League.

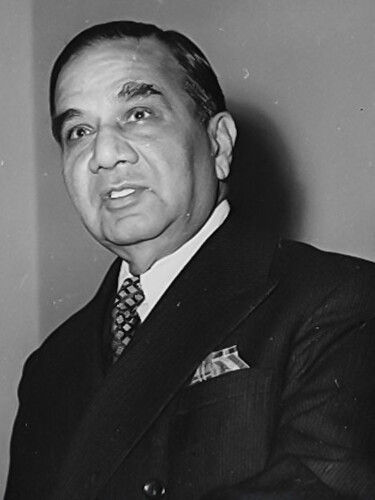
Suhrawardy as PM

=== Nuclear energy ===
Suhrawardy established the Pakistan Atomic Energy Commission (PAEC). He appointed Dr. Nazir Ahmad as its chairman. Suhrawardy supported the Atoms for Peace initiative. Suhrawardy also released funds to import a nuclear swimming pool reactor from America in 1956.

=== Economic policy and foreign aid ===
In 1956, Prime Minister Suhrawardy halted the National Finance Commission (NFC) programme to allocate taxed revenue equally between East and West Pakistan. A poor harvest led to heavy imports that year, mostly in the form of foreign aid, to meet food shortages. The United States agreed to sell $46.4 million in rice, wheat, and other farm products, about 80% of which was covered by aid grants or loans.

The central government led by Suhrawardy focused on the implementation of the planned economy. His relations with the stock exchange and the business community deteriorated when he announced distribution of the US$10 million ICA aid between West and East, and establishing the shipping corporation at the expense of West Pakistan's revenues. Massive labour strikes broke out in West Pakistan against his economic policy in major cities of Pakistan. Eventually leaders of the stock exchange met with President Mirza to address their concerns and issues.

=== Foreign policy ===
Suhrawardy in 1957 described Pakistan's foreign policy as "friendship towards all and malice towards none", a phrase which was later adopted as Bangladesh's foreign policy. Suhrawardy is also considered to be one of the pioneers of Pakistan's foreign policy aimed, directed, and set towards excessively supporting the United States and their cause, a policy that was pursued by the successive administrations. On 10 July 1957, Prime Minister Suhrawardy paid an official visit to the United States where he met with President Dwight Eisenhower. Suhrawardy accepted Eisenhower's request to lease a base in Pakistan from which the United States Air Force could gather intelligence about the Soviet Union. In return, the United States distributed $2.142 billion in aid to Pakistan, including supersonic F-104 Starfighters and M48 Patton tanks. Suhrawardy's party, the Awami League, split over his signing of the US-Pakistan military pact, with Maulana Bhasani leaving to form the National Awami Party (NAP). The 1960 U-2 incident severely compromised the national security of Pakistan when Soviet Union eventually discovered the base through interrogating its pilot.

Prime Minister Suhrawardy was invited by the Soviet Union for an informal visit but he declined. In 1956, Prime Minister Suhrawardy became the Pakistan's first prime minister to visit China. Suhrawardy's India policy was at times critical. He demanded a fair share of water sharing on transboundary rivers. Suhrawardy visited Afghanistan and pledged to work for regional peace, decolonization and stability. Suhrawardy also visited Japan and felt the East Asian country was model to emulate in development. He addressed a joint sitting of the Philippines Congress during which he expressed support for SEATO and continued to call for decolonization.

=== Resignation ===
Suhrawardy's short-lived premiership came to an end when he resigned under pressure from President Iskander Mirza in 1957.

=== Post-coup life ===
Suhrawardy was arrested by the martial law government after the 1958 military coup in Pakistan. While in jail, he wrote to his niece Salma Sobhan on the occasion of her wedding to Rehman Sobhan, calling Salma "preternaturally transcendentally intelligent".

== Death ==
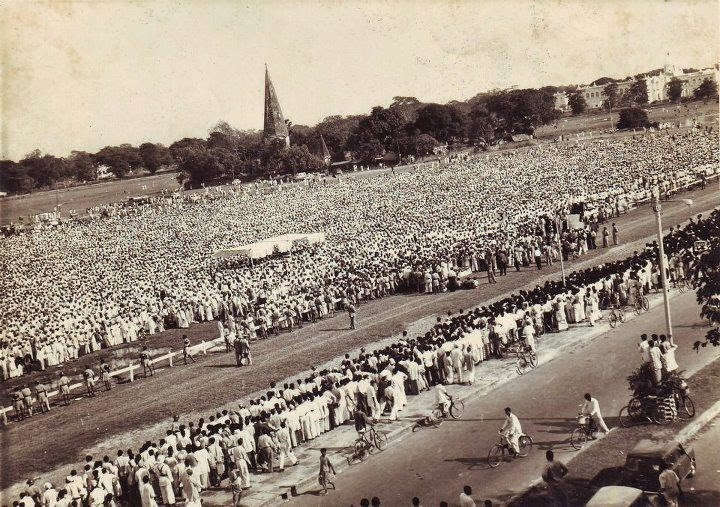
Large processions following the funeral of Suhrawardy at Ramna Racecourse Ground (now Suhrawardy Udyan)

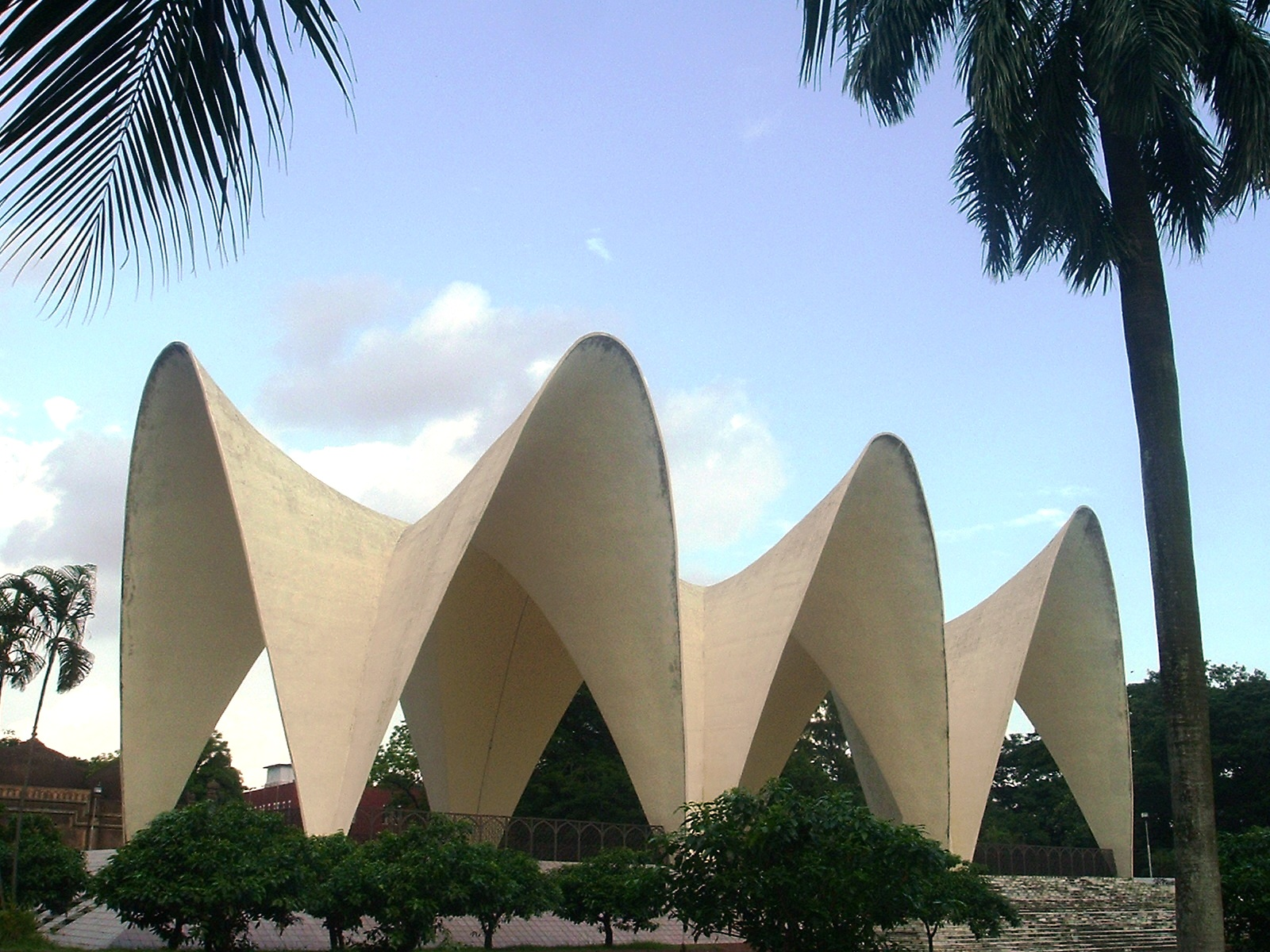
Suhrawardy is buried at this mausoleum in Dhaka, Bangladesh alongside A. K. Fazlul Huq and Khawaja Nazimuddin

Suhrawardy died in Beirut, Lebanon in 1963 due to a heart attack. Many Bangladeshis were - and some still are - convinced that he was killed on Ayub Khan's order, as his popularity may have made him a powerful rival to Ayub in the upcoming presidential elections. He was buried in Dhaka beside Sir Khawaja Nazimuddin and A. K. Fazlul Huq, signifying his towering stature in Bengali politics as one of the three leading Bengali statesmen of the early 20th century.

== Legacy ==
- Khayaban-e-Suhrawardy (lit. Garden of Suhrawardy), is one of the main thoroughfares of the Pakistani capital of Islamabad.
- In 2004, Suhrawardy was ranked number 19 in the BBC's poll of the Greatest Bengali of all time.

== Criticism of Suhrawardy ==
=== Role in the 1943 Bengal Famine ===
During the Bengal famine of 1943, Suhrawardy served as the Minister for Civil Supplies in the cabinet of Khawaja Nazimuddin. Critics and contemporary observers argued that his ministry failed to effectively regulate food distribution, prevent hoarding, or curb wartime rice speculation. Historians note that the administration's reliance on free-market dynamics and administrative paralysis exacerbated price inflation, contributing to widespread mortality across rural Bengal. Conversely, defenders contend that the crisis was primarily driven by British imperial policy—specifically wartime "denial policies" and global shipping reallocations directed by the Churchill administration—rather than provincial policy failures alone.

=== Direct Action Day and the Great Calcutta Killings (1946) ===
Suhrawardy's tenure as Chief Minister of Bengal in 1946 remains one of the most heavily scrutinized periods of his political career. Following the All-India Muslim League’s call for "Direct Action Day" on August 16, 1946, Suhrawardy declared a public holiday across Bengal.

==== Administrative criticisms ====
Political rivals, particularly within the Indian National Congress, alleged that declaring a public holiday allowed organized groups to enforce strikes and assemble large crowds, directly enabling the outbreak of communal violence. Critics also highlighted his presence at the Lalbazar Police Headquarters during the initial outbreaks, interpreting it as an attempt to interfere with law enforcement operations.

==== Alternative perspectives ====
Revisionist historians and biographers argue that Suhrawardy's presence at police headquarters was meant to expedite emergency responses amid a systemic breakdown of the colonial administrative apparatus. They contend that the local police force was structurally understaffed and unprepared for communal warfare on such a scale, rather than deliberately restrained under executive order.

=== The United Bengal Proposal (1947) ===
In early 1947, Suhrawardy, alongside coalition partners such as Sarat Chandra Bose, advocated for a sovereign, undivided Bengal independent of both India and Pakistan. The initiative faced opposition from multiple political factions:

==== Opposition from Congress and Hindu Mahasabha ====
Opponents argued that a sovereign Bengal with a Muslim demographic majority would inevitably align with Pakistan or marginalize the Hindu minority, prompting requests for the partition of the province to secure West Bengal for the Indian Union.

==== Opposition from Muslim League leadership ====
Key figures within the central Muslim League viewed the proposal as a departure from the Two-Nation Theory and an impediment to the unified creation of Pakistan.

=== Foreign Policy and Centralization in Pakistan (1956–1957) ===
During his tenure as Prime Minister of Pakistan (1956–1957), Suhrawardy faced internal ideological critiques from within his own political base, the Awami League:

==== Pro-Western realignment ====
Despite earlier opposition stances, Suhrawardy firmly aligned Pakistan with Western military alliances, including SEATO and CENTO (the Baghdad Pact). This stance led to a rift with the left-wing faction of the Awami League led by Maulana Bhashani, who advocated for non-alignment and anti-imperialism, ultimately contributing to a party split and the formation of the National Awami Party (NAP).

==== Support for the "One Unit" scheme ====
Suhrawardy supported the One Unit policy, which amalgamated the provinces of West Pakistan into a single administrative block to balance representation with East Pakistan. Critics in East Bengal argued that this framework compromised the principle of population-based democratic representation, while regional leaders in West Pakistan criticized it for eroding provincial autonomy.

=== Economic policies and industrial disparities (1956–1957) ===
As prime minister, Suhrawardy oversaw economic planning attempts designed to address regional disparities between East and West Pakistan, yet his decisions drew sharp opposition from business elites and political rivals in West Pakistan.

==== Foreign aid allocation ====
Suhrawardy attempted to divert a higher proportion of U.S. economic aid and foreign exchange allocations directly to East Pakistan to stimulate industrial development in the eastern wing. Mercantile groups based in Karachi and political leaders in West Pakistan strongly opposed these redistribution measures, claiming they undermined central economic planning and threatened existing commerce sectors.

==== Commercial regulations ====
Industrialists criticized his administration's tightening of import licensing regimes and state interventions, arguing that the economic policies created market instability. This economic friction alienated influential commercial interests, eroding Suhrawardy's governing coalition and contributing to President Iskander Mirza forcing his resignation in October 1957.

=== Legal Challenges and Disqualification under EBDO (1959–1962) ===
Following the 1958 military coup d'état led by General Ayub Khan, Suhrawardy became a prominent target of the military regime's campaign to neutralize senior civilian politicians.

==== Disqualification under EBDO ====
In 1960, Suhrawardy was banned from political activity under the Elective Bodies (Disqualification) Order (EBDO), accused of financial irregularities, administrative misconduct, and nepotism during his tenure in office. Proponents of the military government argued that EBDO tribunals exposed chronic patronage and systemic corruption within the parliamentary system.

==== Arrest and opposition mobilization ====
In January 1962, Suhrawardy was arrested and detained under the Security of Pakistan Act without formal trial, accused of anti-state activities. Supporters and constitutional lawyers criticized his detention as an arbitrary political maneuver designed to suppress legal opposition prior to the promulgation of the 1962 Constitution. Upon his release, Suhrawardy formed the National Democratic Front (NDF), a cross-party alliance advocating for the restoration of parliamentary democracy, though critics argued the front lacked a coherent socio-economic ideology beyond anti-Ayub agitation.

== See also ==
- Bengali nationalism in Pakistan
- Conservatism in Pakistan
- Bengali culture in Pakistan
- American lobby in Pakistan
- Pakistan–United States relations

== Notes ==
Political offices
Preceded by Chaudhry Muhammad Ali	Prime Minister of Pakistan; 1956–1957	Succeeded by Ibrahim Ismail Chundrigar
Preceded by Chaudhry Muhammad Ali	Minister of Defence; 1956–1957	Succeeded by Mian Mumtaz Daultana
