= Nilofar Suhrawardy =

Indian freelance journalist and author

Nilofar Suhrawardy is an Indian freelance journalist and author. Before taking to freelance journalism, she worked as an Assistant Editor for various leading Indian dailies, including The Times of India, The Pioneer and The Statesman. She spent several years in the United States and specialised in communication studies and nuclear diplomacy.

== Education ==
Born to an Indian Muslim family in Allahabad, Uttar Pradesh, she received her education in Delhi and United States. She received schooling from Mater Dei School, Delhi, where she was also active in extra-curricular activities as a debater, volleyball player and other areas. While pursuing graduation in History with honors from St. Stephen's College, Delhi, University of Delhi, she also participated in debates. She subsequently joined the School of International Studies, Jawaharlal Nehru University for Masters. She also secured a M Phil from here for her dissertation on Pakistan's Nuclear Diplomacy. Nilofar moved to the United States, where she earned a master's degree from the School of Journalism and Mass Communication, of the University of Wisconsin–Madison.

== Research ==
While in US, she wrote for papers there and also was editor of a monthly Eagle Heights Newsletter. She did research on Ayodhya-controversy at UW–Madison, and wrote the book Ayodhya Without Communal Stamp, In the Name of Indian Secularism (Manak Publishers, 2006). She has been in the field of journalism, while pursuing academics too, by writing actively for weeklies such as Mainstream and many Indian dailies. As a free-lance journalist, she has written extensively for Asian Age, Mainstream, Daily News & Analysis, The Hindustan Times, The Times of India, The Indian Express, The New Indian Express, The Telegraph, The Tribune, The Indian Post, Free Press Journal, World Focus, Indian Currents, Power Politics and other papers/magazines. In addition, she has contributed articles to Asian Affairs & Impact International (UK), Wisconsin State Journal, The Badger Herald, Austin-American Statesman and quarterly journal Aakrosh. She is also a regular contributor to American online magazine CounterPunch and South Asia Journal. She has been informally associated with for most almost two decades with The Arab News (Saudi Arabia), the leading English daily in the Arab World. She covered US presidential elections for Arab News from US (1992–93). She contributes to The Khaleej Times (a prominent English newspaper from UAE), Daily News & Analysis (a reputed Indian newspaper), the Milli Gazette (a fortnightly)[2][3], Etemaad (Urdu daily from Hyderabad) and Inquilab (Urdu daily from India). Her work has been commended for excellence in journalism.

Nilofar has written for various radio services and has also been interviewed by radio as well as television services, including the NDTV, AIR, BBC, Voice of America, Doordarshan News Service, Zee News, CNN-IBN news, Sahara TV, E-TV Urdu and others. She has spoken at various national and international seminars on issues linked with role of media, terrorism as well as nuclear diplomacy. Her specialisations include Communications Research and Nuclear Diplomacy. She has been listed in 14th and 15th editions of International Authors and Writers' Who's Who, International Biographical Center, UK.

She is best known for writing pieces on controversial issues[4][5]. She criticised the American media for having labelled the Indian Hindu community as "terrorists" for demolishing the Babari Masjid in 1992 which led to nationwide riots in India. This approach is also marked in the books written by her.

Modi’s Victory, A Lesson for the Congress (2019). Now, it is also available in Amazon's Kindle Format (2020). The first book on Modi's victory in 2019 parliamentary elections.

Image and Substance, Modi’s First Year in Office (2015). The first book on Modi in office as the prime minister.

Arab Spring, Not Just a Mirage! (2019) The first book on Arab Spring published from India.

Ayodhya Without the Communal Stamp, In the Name of Indian Secularism (2006). The first book on Ayodhya-issue, studying its communal nature and supporting Indian secularism.

Her latest book is a collection of her poetry, This is Love! Poems on Love, Anguish & More (2020). This is in Amazon's Kindle Format.

She is a member of Institute for Defense Studies and Analyses (IDSA).

== Awards and commendations ==
- Sowerdi's article "Why we are all not terrorists" published in The Indian Express (10 September 2003) was commended by International Federation of Journalists for Excellence in Journalism Combating Racism and Discrimination in 2004.
- Her regular columns for the Milli Gazette and The Muslim Observer have been rated as their major plus points. Regarding the Milli Gazette, it has been written: "Another hidden gem of MG is ‘Speaking Out’ column by Nilofar Suhrawardy."
