= Begum Akhtar Sulaiman =

Social worker

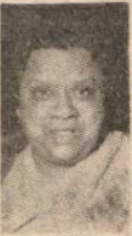
- Born: 1922
- Died: 1982 (aged 59–60)
- Spouse: Shah Ahmed Sulaiman
- Children: Shahida Jamil
- Father: Huseyn Shaheed Suhrawardy
- Relatives: Rashid Suhrawardy (brother)

Begum Akhtar Sulaiman (née Akhtar Jahan Suhrawardy; 1922–1982) was a Pakistani-Bengali social worker, political activist and the daughter of Huseyn Shaheed Suhrawardy, the fifth Prime Minister of Pakistan. Begum Akhtar Suleiman, went out on a limb to support the Yahya Khan regime during the Bangladesh Liberation War of 1971. She started actively supporting the activities of the Yahya Khan government. She gave a number of statements at that time on behalf of the Suhrawardy family saying her father believed in the unity of Pakistan. Her daughter Shahida Jamil served as the first female Pakistani Federal Minister for Law.

== Family ==
Begum Sulaiman was married to Shah Ahmed Sulaiman (son of Justice Sir Shah Sulaiman and the Karachi manager of a large British export-import company that dealt in antibiotics and other medical supplies) and had one child, Shahida Jamil (who later became the first female Pakistani Federal Minister for Law). Shahida Jamil has two sons, Zahid Jamil (a lawyer in Pakistan) and Shahid Jamil (an attorney in Chicago).

== Public service ==
Begum Sulaiman's interest in civic and philanthropic work began when she was quite young. When the killings on Direct Action Day occurred in 1946 she worked hours on end to relieve the suffering of the riot victims. Later she founded widows and children's home and was named Honorary Lady Magistrate dealing with juvenile delinquency. She was also an Honorary Secretary of the Girls Orphanage in Calcutta.

Immediately following Pakistan's independence in 1947, Begum Sulaiman, in order to assist her father's efforts of promoting Hindu-Muslim harmony, made it her special concern to study the grievances of the Muslim minority in India and bring their plight to the attention of the authorities as well as seek redress for them.

Begum Sulaiman, after moving to Pakistan in 1948, worked with the refugees migrating from India to Pakistan to better their condition. When her father, a widower, became Prime Minister of Pakistan in 1956, Begum Sulaiman acted as his hostess, accompanying him during his state visits in the US (Summer 1957) and China (October 1956).

She was the president of the Society for the Rehabilitation of Crippled Children, Karachi. Among her many other social activities, she was president of the Refugee Co-Ordinating Council; president of the Pakistan Guild Welfare Council, Karachi section; vice president of the Adult Blind Center; vice president of the All Pakistan Child Welfare Council, member of the executive body of the National Council Social Works, member of the executive body of the Pakistan Red Cross and district commissioner of the Girl Guides Association of Karachi.
