= Hassan Suhrawardy =

Bengali surgeon, military officer and politician (1884-1946)

Hassan Suhrawardy CStJ, FRCS
- হাসান সোহরাওয়ার্দী
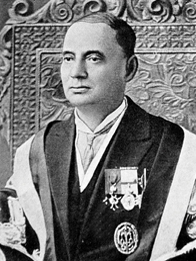

Vice-Chancellor of Calcutta University
- In office 8 August 1930 – 7 August 1934
- Preceded by: W. S. Urquhart
- Succeeded by: Syama Prasad Mukherjee

Personal details
- Born: 17 November 1884 Dacca, Bengal, British India
- Died: 18 September 1946 (aged 61) Calcutta, Bengal, British India
- Spouse: Sahibzadi Shahbanu Begum
- Children: Shaista Suhrawardy (daughter)
- Parent: Ubaidullah Al Ubaidi Suhrawardy (father)
- Relatives: Suhrawardy family; Huseyn Shaheed Suhrawardy (nephew); Abdullah Al-Mamun Suhrawardy (brother); Khujista Akhtar Banu (sister); Zahid Suhrawardy (cousin); Ibrahim Suhrawardy (nephew); Begum Badar un nissa Akhtar (niece); Syud Hossain (brother-in-law)

Military service
- Branch/service: British Indian Army
- Rank: Lieutenant-Colonel

Lieutenant-Colonel Hassan Suhrawardy CStJ, FRCS (17 November 1884 – 18 September 1946) was a Bengali surgeon, military officer in the British Indian Army, politician, and a public official. He was the former chairman of the executive committee of the East London Mosque. Knighted in 1932, he renounced his British honours a month before his death.

== Life and family ==
Hassan Suhrawardy was born in Dhaka, to Ubaidullah Al Ubaidi Suhrawardy, an educationist and scion of the prominent Suhrawardy family of Midnapore (now in West Bengal, India). At a very young age, Hassan was married to Sahibzadi Shahbanu Begum, daughter of Nawab Syed Muhammad Azad, in a match arranged by their families in the usual Indian way. They had a harmonious marriage and were the parents of two children, a son Hassan Masud Suhrawardy (1903–1963) and a daughter, Shaista Suhrawardy Ikramullah. Hassan's daughter Shaista was married to Mohammed Ikramullah, a Pakistani diplomat and brother of Chief Justice Mohammad Hidayatullah, sometime vice-president of India. Through Shaista Begum, Hassan Suhrawardy is the grandfather of Salma Sobhan, Naz Ikramullah and Princess Sarvath of Jordan.

5th Prime Minister of Pakistan Huseyn Shaheed Suhrawardy was a son of Khujastha Akhtar Banu, a sister of Hassan Suhrawardy. Khujastha was married to her cousin Justice Sir Zahid Suhrawardy, an early Indian judge of the Calcutta High Court.

== Career ==
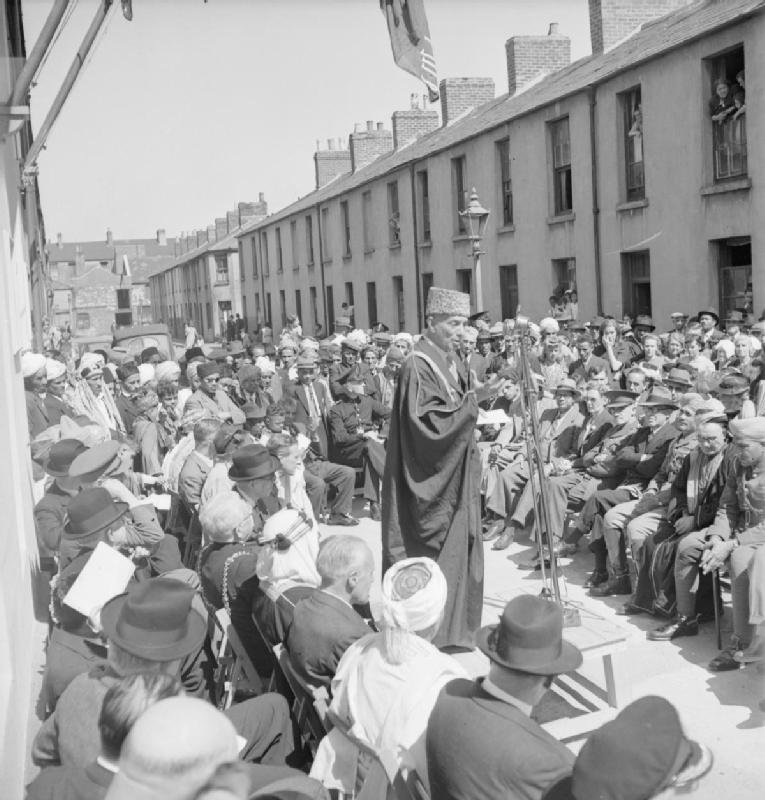
Suhrawardy stands at a microphone as he speaks to the audience in Cardiff (1943)

Suhrawardy was the first Muslim vice-chancellor of Calcutta University (1930–1934) and the second Muslim from the sub-continent to become a Fellow of the Royal College of Surgeons of England. In 1945 he was appointed Professor of Islamic History and Culture in Calcutta University while retaining the chair of Public Health and Hygiene, which he had held since 1931.

Suhrawardy served as an adviser to the Simon Commission and was a member of the Bengal Legislative Council of which he was deputy president from 1923 to 1925. As the chief medical and health officer of the East Indian Railway, he founded the railway's ambulance and nursing division.

Suhrawardy also played a role towards the establishment of the East London Mosque.

== Knighthood and later life ==
While Suhrawardy was vice-chancellor and dean of the Faculty of Medicine, he received his knighthood immediately after he had saved the life of Sir Stanley Jackson from an assassination attempt by Bina Das, a student, in the Senate House of the University of Calcutta in February 1932. His distinguished career in medicine and in the public service was crowned in 1939 by his appointment to succeed Sir Abdul Qadir as the adviser to the Secretary of State for India. He retired from that post in 1944.

Suhrawardy was appointed an OBE in the 1927 Birthday Honours list, awarded the Kaiser-i-Hind Medal, First Class in the same honours list in 1930, knighted on 17 February 1932, appointed an Associate Officer of the Venerable Order of St. John (OStJ) in January 1932 and promoted to Associate Commander in January 1937.

== Death and legacy ==
Suhrawardy died at the Calcutta School of Tropical Medicine, aged 61. He had renounced his knighthood and OBE a month before his death in August 1946, when the Muslim League decided to renounce all British honours.

. Suhrawardy's house "Kashana" stood on that road. As of 2020, the house is used as the Library and Information Center building of the Deputy High Commission of Bangladesh.
