= Hasan Shaheed Suhrawardy =

Bengali diplomat, poet and art critic (1890–1965)

Hasan Shahid Suhrawardy
- হাসান শহীদ সোহরাওয়ার্দী
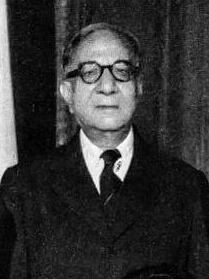
- Born: 24 October 1890; Midnapore, Bengal, British India
- Died: 3 March 1965 (aged 74); Karachi, West Pakistan, Pakistan
- Parents: Zahid Suhrawardy (father); Khujista Akhtar Banu (mother)
- Relatives: Huseyn Shaheed Suhrawardy (brother); Hassan Suhrawardy (uncle); Shaista Suhrawardy Ikramullah (cousin)

Academic background
- Education: University of Calcutta; Oxford University

Hasan Shahid Suhrawardy (Bengali: হাসান শহীদ সোহরাওয়ার্দী; 24 October 1890 – 3 March 1965), also known as Shahid Suhrawardy, was a Bengali diplomat, translator, poet and art critic.

== Family and education ==
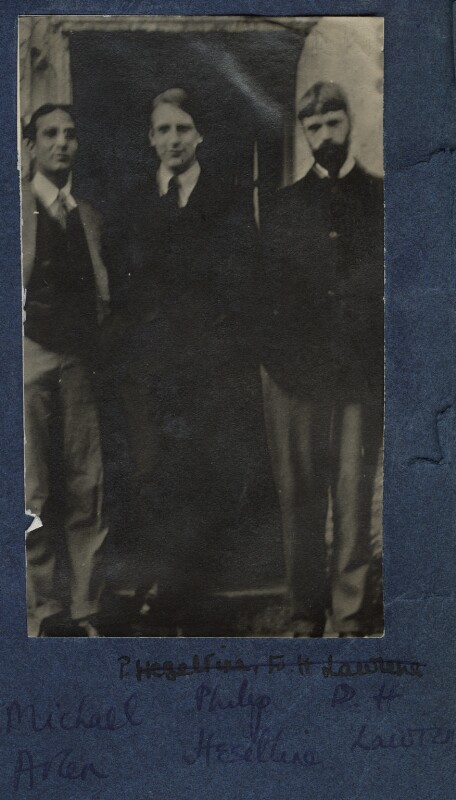
(from left) Suhrawardy, Philip Arnold Heseltine (Peter Warlock) and D. H. Lawrence on 29 November 1915

Shahid Suhrawardy's father, Sir Zahid Suhrawardy, was a Justice of the Calcutta High Court and his younger brother Huseyn Shaheed Suhrawardy was a politician and 5th Prime Minister of Pakistan. Shaista Suhrawardy Ikramullah, his first cousin, was an intellectual and diplomat.

Shahid Suhrawardy obtained a BA (Hons) degree in English from the University of Calcutta in 1909, as a student of the Scottish Churches College. In 1913, he graduated from Oxford University in Law.

During his time at Oxford he became friends with Robert Bridges, D. H. Lawrence and R.C. Trevelyan.

== Career ==
In 1914, Suhrawardy went on to Russia on a scholarship to further study the Russian language of which he already had a certain degree of mastery. He stayed on becoming Professor of English at Moscow University and was caught in the Russian Revolution (1917). Suhrawardy returned to Russia to work and tour with the Moscow Art Theatre (1926–29) and then later came to reside in Paris with Professor Kalitinsky and his wife Maria Nikolaevna Germanova, a famous tragic actress of Russia in her time. In Paris, he served as the editor of the Fine Art Section of the League of Nations. He was also associated with editing of a quarterly journal on Byzantian art published from Prague.

Following his return to India in 1932, Osmania University in Hyderabad commissioned him to write an introductory book on the Islamic art of different countries of the world. Later, he came to Visva-Bharati University at Rabindranath Tagore's invitation and researched on Iranian art in Santiniketan as the Nizam Professor. He was an art-critic for The Statesman and was instrumental in bringing the work of Bengali painter Jamini Roy to the notice of the public.

Suhrawardy was a member of the Bengal Public Service Commission during 1943–46. Following the creation of Pakistan in 1947, he went to Karachi at the end of 1948. He was active as a member of the Federal Public Service Commission of Pakistan till 1952. He served as a guest lecturer of Oriental Art for two years at Columbia University commencing in 1952. At that time a new mansion for UNESCO was built in Paris and a selection committee was formed with international art-specialists to choose paintings that would decorate it in a befitting manner with artwork. Suhrawardy was a member of this committee.

Suhrawardy also worked as a diplomat. He was an ambassador of Pakistan to Spain, Morocco, Tunisia and the Vatican from 1954 onwards. He was very close to Jawaharlal Nehru and Sudhindranath Dutta. He was proficient in many languages including Russian, Cantonese, Aramaic, Greek, Italian, Spanish, French.

Suhrawardy retired in 1959 and returned to Pakistan and took no active part in public life.

Suhrawardy was the Founder President of Pakistan PEN, a sister organisation of the International Affiliation of Writers Guilds. His anthology titled Essays in Verse of his work was published in 1962 from Dhaka. It included the poems he had written during his stay at Oxford and works that he had published in different English and American literary journals. His poems embody the spirit of the different avant-garde poetic movements of Europe. The book itself is divided into three parts: New Poems, Early Poems and An Oldman's Songs, which reflect elegant and tender thoughts.

== Bibliography ==
Suhrawardy earned fame as Rani Bagiswari Professor of Fine Arts at the University of Calcutta during 1932–43. A compilation of his famous lectures named Prefaces: Lectures on Art Subjects was published by the university. Other works by him worth mentioning are: The Art of Jamini Ray; Mussalman Culture (translated from the original Russian work by Vasily Bartold); A Handbook of Mussalman Art; The Art of the Mussalmans in Spain; and Wanderings of a Gourmet. The first of these books a pioneering work of art-criticism written in a lucid style. He is also known to have written a book on cookery and another translating the poems of Li Houzhu.

== Death ==
Shahid Suhrawardy died on 3 March 1965 in Karachi.
