= Ubaidullah Al Ubaidi Suhrawardy =

Professor, translator and writer

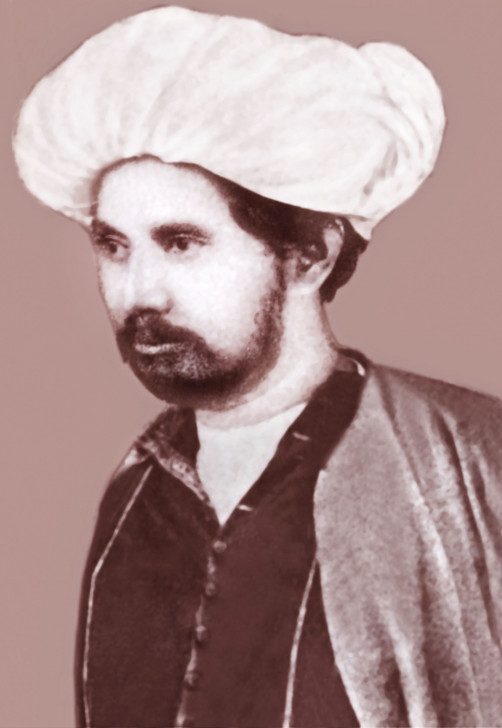
- Born: 1832; Midnapore, Bengal, British India
- Died: 9 February 1885 (aged 52–53); Dacca, Bengal, British India
- Education: Calcutta Madrasa
- Occupation: Professor
- Children: 8, including Abdullah Al-Mamun Suhrawardy, Hassan Suhrawardy, Amin Suhrawardy and Khujista Akhtar Banu
- Relatives: Huseyn Shaheed Suhrawardy (grandson); Shaista Ikramullah (granddaughter); Begum Badar un nissa Akhtar (granddaughter)
- Writing career
- Period: Bengal Renaissance
- Notable works: Lubbul Arab; Dastar-e-Farsi Amuz; Miftahul Adab; Mohammedan Education in Bengal
- Notable awards: Bahrul Ulm

Ubaidullah Al Ubaidi Suhrawardy (Arabic: عبيد الله العبيدي السهروردي, Bengali: ওবায়দুল্লাহ আল ওবায়দী সোহরাওয়ার্দী; 1832 – 9 February 1885) was a Bengali Islamic scholar, educationist and writer from Midnapore. He is regarded as the Father of modern Islamic education in Bengal and was awarded with the title of Bahr ul Ulum, meaning: sea of knowledge by the British.

== Early life ==
Suhrawardy was born in 1832, in the village of Chitwa in Midnapore district, Bengal Presidency. He belonged to the noble Bengali Muslim Suhrawardy family who had arrived to Hussain Shahi Sultanate of Bengal in the 15th century, and were bestowed with the Jaagirdaari of Ghoramara. Suhrawardy was a direct descendant of the Sufi author Shihab al-Din 'Umar al-Suhrawardi, who was in turn a descendant of Abu Bakr, the first Rashidun caliph.

Suhrawardy's father, Shah Aminuddin Suhrawardy, was the final Pir of the Suhrawardy family and is buried in a mazar in Hooghly. Two of his brothers were lawyers and subordinate judges (the highest rank available under British rule at the time). His siblings were Ruhul Amin Suhrawardy, Maulvi Mubarak Ali Suhrawardy (alias Mohammad Ali), Abdul Ali Suhrawardy and Umme Kulsum Suhrawardy.

== Education ==
Suhrawardy was homeschooled, and educated in Islamic studies, Arabic and Persian. He also learnt English. Suhrawardy graduated from Calcutta Alia Madrasa in 1857 during the Sepoy mutiny.

== Career ==
Ubaidullah first job was working as an aide to Prince Jalaluddin, the grandson of Tipu Sultan of Mysore, in Kolkata. After which he worked as the Scrivener at the Legislative Council, part of the office of the Viceroy of India. In 1865, he joined the Hooghly Mohsin College and taught Anglo-Arabic. One of his student was Syed Ameer Ali. In 1874, he was appointed the first superintendent of Dhaka Madrassah.

Ubaidullah was a follower of Nawab Abdul Latif and Sir Syed Ahmed Khan. He was affiliated with the Mohammedan Literary Society (1863), Central National Mohammedan Association (1877), Bengal Social Science Association and other organisations in Calcutta. He was also a member of the managing committee of the Muhammadan Anglo-Oriental College at Aligarh (1875). He founded, in Dacca, two reformist and community development associations: Samaj Sammilani Sabha in 1879, and Mussalman Suhrid Sammilani (Mohhamedan Friends Association) in 1883.

Ubaidullah wrote books in Urdu, Arabic, Persian and English and translated many works. Noted among his works are Grammar of Arabic Language, Urdu Diwan (Urdu poems, 1880), Farsi Dewan (Persian poems, 1886), Dastar-e-Parsi Amuz (Persian grammar), Lubbul Arab (Arabic grammar), Miftahul Adab (Urdu grammar), Dabistan-i-Danish Amuz (Urdu, physics), Dastar-e-Farsi Amuz (Persian, rhythm and rhetorics), Dastan-i-Ibratbar (Persian, autobiography). With the assistance of Syed Amir Ali, he rendered Makhaz-ul-Ulm by Syed Keramat Ali into English as a Treatise on the Sciences (1867) and Rammohun Roy's Tuhfatul Muwahedin into English in 1884. His Mohammedan Education in Bengal (1867) is an original work on education. He edited Guide (Urdu) and Durbeen (Persian). A number of his manuscripts on philology, psychology, women's education, in Urdu, still remain unpublished. He also understood basic Latin and Greek.

The Indian government awarded him the title Bahrul Ulm (Sea of knowledge)for his contribution to education in India. The University of Dhaka awards the Bahrul Ulm Ubaidi Suhrawardy medal, which was named after him. Acharya Harinath De, as a tribute to him, created an oil painting of him.

== Death and legacy ==
Ubaidullah died in Dhaka, Bengal Presidency, British India, on 9 February 1885. His son, Hassan Suhrawardy, was a noted politician in British India and his granddaughter, Shaista Suhrawardy Ikramullah, was a notable academic and diplomat of Pakistan. His daughter, Khujista Akhtar Banu, was a well-known writer and poet.
