= Begum Badar un nissa Akhtar =

Indian social reformer and educator

- Born: 16 February 1894; Midnapore, Bengal, British India
- Died: 31 January 1956 (aged 61); Cuttack, Odisha, India
- Spouse: Sayeed Mohammed
- Issue: Ather-ul Amin, Fazal-ul Amin, Afzal-ul Amin, Shamsunnihar Akhtar, Husnara Begum
- House: Suhrawardiyya (by birth); Ni'matullāhī (by marriage)
- Dynasty: Suhrawardy family
- Father: Amin Suhrawardy
- Religion: Islam

Begum Badar un Nissa Akhtar (1894 -1956; Midnapore) was an Indian social reformer and educator from Cuttack, Odisha. She is known for challenging the stringent and orthodox societal norms and for encouraging and enabling Muslim girls to receive formal and skill based education from behind the purdah back in the early 20th century. Begum herself was formally educated and hence she took up a job as a teacher in Cuttack to educate young girls. She worked to promote female education and to abolish gender discrimination and gender injustice in the field of education. She is regarded as one among the first female teachers and educationists of modern British Odisha. The Badar un nissa Assembly hall at Sayeed Seminary is named after her.

== Biography ==
Badar un nissa was born into the illustrious Suhrawardy family of Midnapore, Undivided Bengal, as the only daughter of the then subordinate judge of Calcutta High Court, Aminuddin Al Amin Suhrawardy and his wife Begum Umme Khatun. She was the granddaughter of Ubaidullah Al Ubaidi Suhrawardy. Badar un nissa received her formal education in Midnapore. After her father's death, she was married off to Sayeed Mohammed, the eldest son of Atharuddin Mohammed of the Diwan family in Cuttack.

In Cuttack, Begum Badar proved to be of a great help to her husband, they both started to work for the upliftment of the Muslim society. She helped Sayeed establish the Muslim Seminary at Cuttack. After Sayeed's untimely death in 1922, Begum Badar un nissa was debarred from the family property and title as per the Mahroom-ul-Mariaz tradition of the Shariat, nevertheless she did not let this or her widowhood come on her way in carrying forward her husband's legacy.

In the early 1900s the idea of female education was still new in Odisha. Muslim girls were not allowed to attend schools or attain formal education outside their homes. Badar un nissa made her mind to educate the young girls who were shackled by the patriarchal and orthodox norms. Begum arranged for their education and took charge of it. She even arranged two purdaah-numa horse carriages for the female students and got them admitted to Ravenshaw girls high school, where she herself took up a job as a teacher. Badar un nissa faced resistance from the Muslim society for her actions, but against every odd, she continued to educate young girls in Cuttack. She used to go door-to-door to Muslim households and explain the importance of female education. She personally took the responsibility of educating young girls at school; of bringing them to school safely in purdah and dropping them back home.

In her later life, she worked to abolish the discrimination and unfair treatment based on creed and gender. She even took the charge of spreading education among the downtrodden communities in Cuttack. She is regarded as the first Muslim woman teacher of modern British Odisha. The Begum Badar un nissa assembly hall inside the Sayeed Seminary at Cuttack is named after her.

== See also ==
- Fatima Sheikh
- Savitribai Phule
- Ramadevi Choudhury
