= Zahid Suhrawardy =

Indian Bengali jurist and judge (1870-1949)

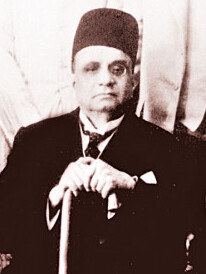
- Suhrawardy in Kolkata, 1937

Judge, Calcutta High Court
- In office 25 February 1921 – 27 November 1931

Personal details
- Born: Zuhad Rahim Zahid Suhrawardy; 27 November 1870 Midnapore, Bengal, British India
- Died: 2 January 1949 (aged 78) Calcutta, West Bengal, India
- Spouse: Khujista Akhtar Banu
- Children: Hasan Shaheed Suhrawardy; Huseyn Shaheed Suhrawardy

Sir Zahid Suhrawardy (27 November 1870 – 2 January 1949), also known as Zahidur Rahman, was an Indian Bengali jurist who served a judge in the Calcutta High Court between 1921 and 1931. He was the father of Huseyn Shaheed Suhrawardy, who later became Prime Minister of Pakistan, and linguist Hasan Shaheed Suhrawardy.

== Biography ==
Suhrawardy was born in Midnapore, Bengal, the son of lawyer Sardar Maulana Mobarak Ali Suhrawardy. He was educated at Dacca and Calcutta. He began legal practice after obtaining a degree in law from the University of Calcutta. Beginning his career as a pleader at the district court of 24 Parganas in the Bengal Presidency, he later began practicing as an advocate at the Calcutta High Court. He then qualified for the bar from the Lincoln's Inn as a barrister-at-law, before returning to India. He subsequently commenced practice at the Calcutta High Court again and proved successful, before being elevated as judge at the same court. He resigned from service ten years later, in November 1931. He was knighted in 1928.

In 1888, Suhrawardy married Khujista Akhtar Banu (c.1874–1919), the daughter of educationist Ubaidullah Al Ubaidi Suhrawardy. Their children included linguist Hasan Shaheed Suhrawardy (1890–1965) and Prime Minister of Pakistan Huseyn Shaheed Suhrawardy (1892–1963).

Suhrawardy died in Calcutta on 2 January 1949, aged 78.
