= Abdullah Al-Mamun Suhrawardy =

Bengali scholar

Abdullah al-Mamun Suhrawardy
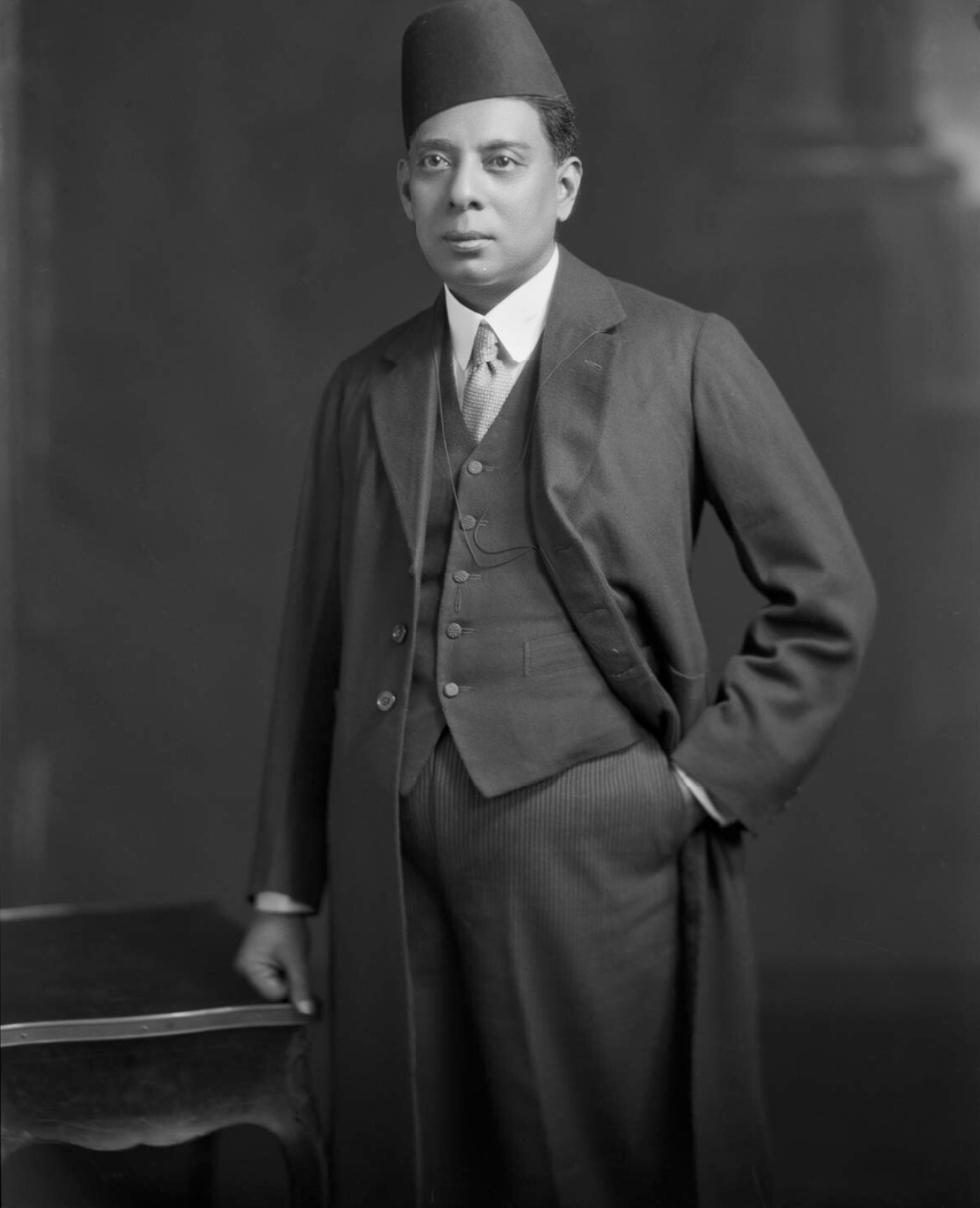
- Suhrawardy in 1929

Member of Indian Legislative Assembly
- In office 1926 – 13 January 1935
- Preceded by: Mohammad Shams-us-Zoha
- Succeeded by: Chowdhury Muhammad Ismail Khan
- Constituency: Burdwan & Presidency

Personal details
- Born: 31 May 1877 Dacca, Bengal, British India
- Died: 13 January 1935 (aged 57) Calcutta, Bengal, British India
- Spouse: Sahebzadi Ahmedi Begum
- Parent: Ubaidullah Al Ubaidi Suhrawardy (father)
- Education: Calcutta University

Sir Abdullah al-Mamun Suhrawardy (31 May 1877 – 13 January 1935) was a Bengali Islamic scholar, barrister, and academic. He was the Tagore Law Lecturer in 1911 and involved in notable educational work. Abdullah was the first Indian to attain a PhD degree in English from Calcutta University Abdullah was the first vice-president of Indian Home Rule Society.

== Early life and education ==
Suhrawardy was the eldest son of Ubaidullah Al Ubaidi Suhrawardy and was born at his Dhaka Madrasah residence in 1877. His younger brother was Lt. Col. Dr. Hassan Suhrawardy. Since primary school, he was a brilliant student, winning a number of stipends and scholarships throughout his school and college career. He graduated with honours in Arabic, English and Philosophy in 1898, obtaining a first class in his special subjects and standing the first of his year both in the B.A. and M.A. examinations of Calcutta University. He was also the first to obtain a PhD degree from Calcutta University in 1908. While studying for the Bar, he achieved an M.A. degree from the London University and used to add to his slender allowance from India by lecturing on Arabic letters and jurisprudence, subjects to which he contributed in his later writings and teachings much of value and freshness.

== Career ==
Deeply impressed by his contact with the Muslims of the Near East, he founded and was the first secretary of the Pan-Islamic Society of London. He took some part in the expression of Indian Muslim opinion on the Morley–Minto Reforms. On returning to Calcutta to practice at the Bar, he was elected to the reformed Bengal Legislative Council.

While the Montagu–Chelmsford Reforms were being formulated, Suhrawardy was selected to be a member of the Reforms Franchise Committee that toured India under the chairmanship of Lord Southborough. He continued to serve on the enlarged Bengal Legislature and was deputy president from 1923 to 1926. He was then elected to the Indian Legislative Assembly of which he continued to be a member till his death in 1935. He founded therein the Central Muslim Party and the All-India Muslim Legislators Association (formed on the suggestion of Aga Khan III) and was its joint-secretary from 1920 to 1926. He was for many years secretary of the Indian Muslim Association of Bengal and in 1920 succeeded Sir Muhammad Shafi as secretary of the All-India Muslim Association. He also took part in the work of the National Liberal Federation until, in 1924, his Islamic zeal led to his acceptance of the presidency of the Khilafat Committee, Calcutta.

Suhrawardy never countenanced civil disobedience or boycott of government and held firmly to the principles of corporate communal expression with which he had been identified. Hence he accepted the nomination of government, as a member of the Legislative Assembly, to the Indian Central Committee, which in 1928-9 cooperated with the Simon Commission. He took strong exception to what he regarded as the arbitrary conduct of the proceedings by the chairman, Sir C. Sankaran Nair. A supplementary note that he handed in for publication did not appear in the report, but was officially published (with the omission of some "purple patches" reflecting on the chairman) a few months later.

Publication of The Sayings of Muhammad in 1905 prompted the start of correspondence between al-Suhrawardy and Count Lev Tolstoj, which continued until the latter's death. According to one of Tolstoy's daughters (information from the preface to the reprint edition of the Sayings), a copy of the Sayings was found in one of the pockets of the overcoat he was wearing when he died.

== Writings and academia ==
Suhrawardy's major works include Sayings of Muhammad (1905 with a reprint in 1938), First Steps in Muslim Jurisprudence (1906), and Outlines of the Historical Development of Muslim Law. He also took a share in local self-government activities in the Tollygunge municipality and the Midnapore district board from 1920 till 1923. Suhrawardy was knighted in 1931. Suhrawardy was also regularly contributed to magazines like Nabanoor and The Kohinoor.

== Private life ==
Suhrawardy was married to Sahebzadi Ahmedi Begum, a daughter of Sahebzada Mirza Mohamed Ali Nakey. Mirza Mohamed Ali was an elected member of the Bengal Legislative Council from the constituency of 24-Parganas Municipal South appointed in June 1921.
