= Braja Sundar Das =

Indian freedom fighter (1880–1944)

- ବ୍ରଜସୁନ୍ଦର ଦାସ
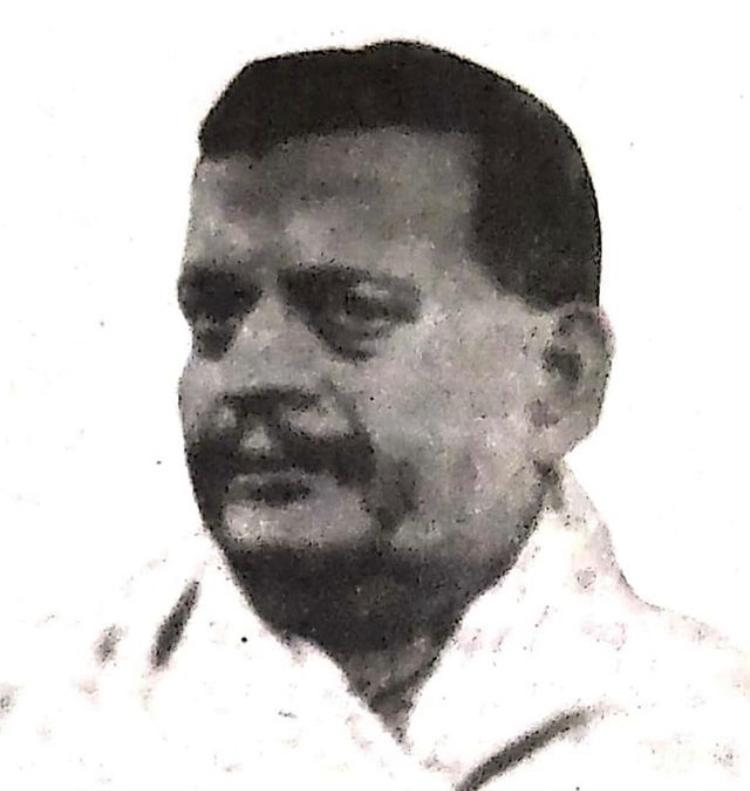
- Born: 2 July 1880; Cuttack, Odisha, British India (now Jajpur)
- Died: 9 June 1944 (aged 63)
- Era: British Raj

Braja Sundar Das (2 July 1880 – 9 June 1944) was an Indian statesman, freedom fighter, politician, poet, littérateur, and social reformer who played a significant role in shaping the socio-political and cultural landscape of Odisha.

Das lobbied for the unification of Odia-speaking areas; a long struggle that culminated in the creation of Odisha as a separate state on 1 April 1936 (Utkala Dibasa).

== Early life and education ==
Braja Sundar Das was born on 2 July 1880 in Kantabania, Harekrushnapur, near Jajpur, Odisha (Odia: କଣ୍ଟାବଣିଆ, ହରେକୃଷ୍ଣପୁର, ଯାଜପୁର, ଓଡ଼ିଶା). He belonged to a wealthy Jamidar Karan lineage, being the son of Shyam Sundar Das and Swarnaprabha Dei. His grandfather, Harekrushna Das, was the Assistant Superintendent of Tributary Mahals and was also instrumental in setting up the Cuttack Printing Company. Brajasundar inherited his family's zamindari, the Tisania estate.

As a child, he attended the Collegiate School in Cuttack, where he completed his early education. Later, he earned his B.A. from the prestigious Presidency College, becoming the third person from Odisha to graduate.

In his early years, at Ravenshaw College, he co-founded an organisation called "Kartabya Bodhini Samiti" (Duty Awakening Society) with his friends Gopabandhu Das and Lokanath Patnaik. This group focused on discussing contemporary social, economic, and political issues. These three Ravenshavians played a pivotal role in advocating for the inclusion of Odia as a medium for the B.A. examination at Ravenshaw, which was then affiliated with Calcutta University. While Brajasundar had already graduated from Presidency College by that time, his efforts ensured that Gopabandhu Das and Lokanath Patnaik became the first students to take their B.A. exams in Odia under the new system and thenceforth the Odia-speaking students can give B.A. exams in medium Odia.

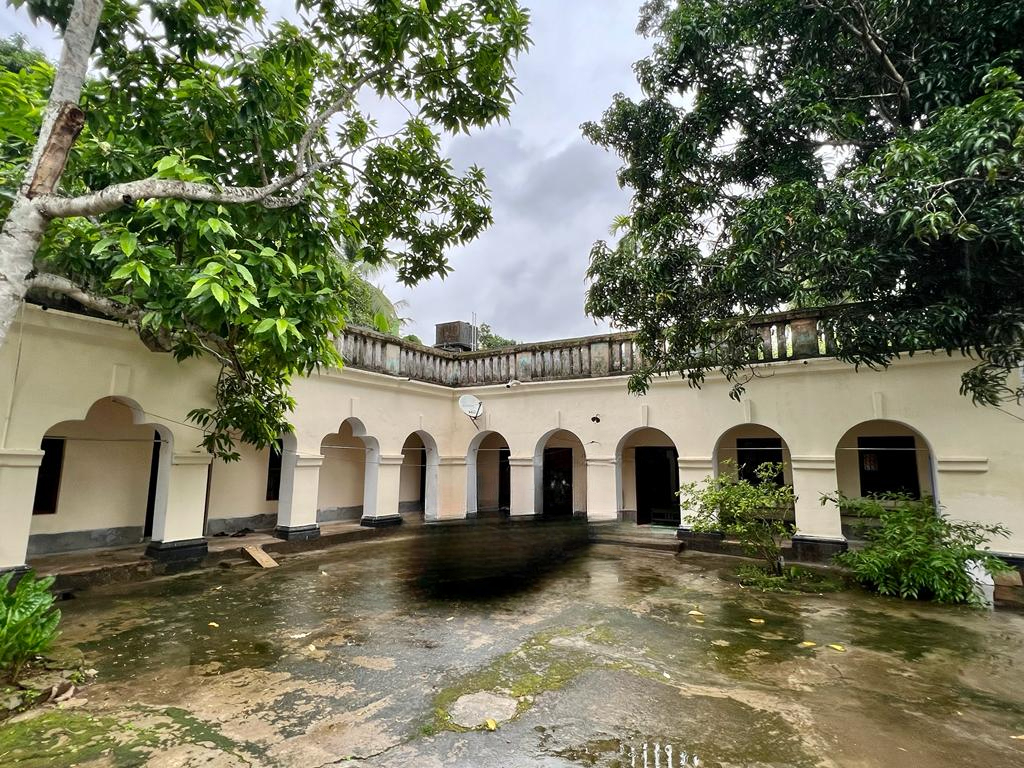
Kutchery House of the erstwhile Tisania estate, at Sayedpur, Jajpur in Odisha

During his time at Ravenshaw, Braja Sundar Das, along with Gopabandhu Das and Acharya Harihar Das, actively engaged in social work. They nursed the poor and sick in the town, collected funds for underprivileged students, and provided social services to those in need. Later, Brajasundar and Gopabandhu co-founded the Central Young Utkal Association, which organised batches of volunteers to assist people affected by floods in Odisha.

Brajasundar later married the daughter of Sudam Charan Naik, who was a Member of the Bihar-Orissa Council and also the Assistant Superintendent of Tributary Mahals.

== Freedom struggle and political career ==
Braja Sundar Das held several prominent political positions throughout his life. He served as a Member of the Bihar-Orissa Legislative Council (1906–1920), Member of the Imperial Legislative Assembly (1921–1924), Member of the Orissa Legislative Assembly (1937–1944), and Chairman of the National War Front (1941). Additionally, he was the Secretary of the Utkal Union Conference (Utkal Sammilani), and editor of "Mukura" and "The Odia" magazines.

In February 1920, after Gandhi's entry into India's political arena, Braja Sundar Das, under the advice of Madhusudan Das, went to meet Mahatma Gandhi and attract his attention to Odisha's demand for independent statehood. In that meeting with Braja Sundar Das, Gandhi expressed his unequivocal decision regarding the formation of provinces on a linguistic basis.

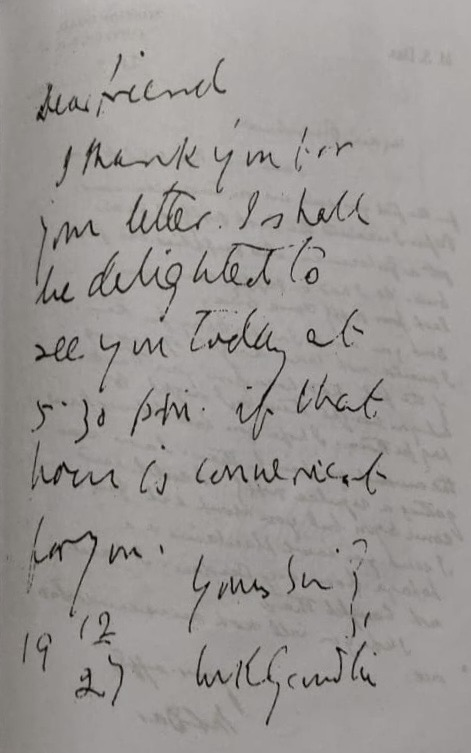
A letter from Mahatma Gandhi to Braja Sundar Das, proposing a meeting.

In 1920 - 21, under the presidency of Gopabandhu Das, the Utkal Union Conference was held at Chakradharpur in present-day Jharkhand, which was/is an Odia-speaking town. It moved a resolution to align its goals and ideals with those of the Indian National Congress. Madhusudhan Das, who was supposed to preside over the session earlier, declined to attend. Similarly, Braja Sundar Das had also declined the position and opposed the motion vehemently, citing ideological differences between the Utkal Union Conference and the Congress. After much-heated debate, the resolution was passed, and a delegation was formed to attend the Nagpur Session of Congress. Among other leaders, Braja Sundar Das was also a part of this delegation. On the return of this delegation, the Utkal Pradesh Congress Committee was constituted, and Gandhi was invited to Odisha to advise on the matters of the state.

After 1921, the Utkal Union Conference (Utkal Sammilani) became inactive. After two years, Braja Sundar Das initiated its transformation into a new name, Utkal Union Committee, with the advice of Madhusudan Das. Thereafter, the Provincial Congress Committee and the Utkal Union Committee worked for a common cause but on different platforms.

In 1927–28, when the Simon Commission arrived in India, Congress issued a directive to boycott the Simon Commission. The leaders of Odisha at that time deemed it appropriate to press the Odia demand before the commission for the formation of Odisha as a separate province. Thus, a committee was formed under the leadership of Braja Sundar Das, who decided to meet the Commission at Patna. To address the issue of the Odia leaders, a Sub-Committee was set up under C.R. Atlee. As a result of the discussions between the committee led by Braja Sundar Das and the Simon Commission, the latter's report opined that the demand of the Odia people to annex Odia-speaking areas under one special province is justified. It also opined that all the Jamidari and Princely States be annexed under the proposed Odisha province. Furthermore, the Government of India announced the appointment of a Boundary Commission under the Chairmanship of S.P. O'Donnell. The leaders of Odisha got together to unify the general public and gather mass support in favour of the independence of Odisha.

Subsequently, in 1931, when the O’Donnell Committee arrived in Odisha, Braja Sundar Das organised a grand procession. He was the Secretary of the Utkal Union Conference (Utkal Sammilani) that year. He amassed a large crowd of students and locals, placed a divided Odisha map atop a decorated elephant, and organised a procession through the city of Cuttack. He donated generously, which caused a large financial setback for him and his estate. However, he managed to attract the attention of the committee and press the demands of his people.

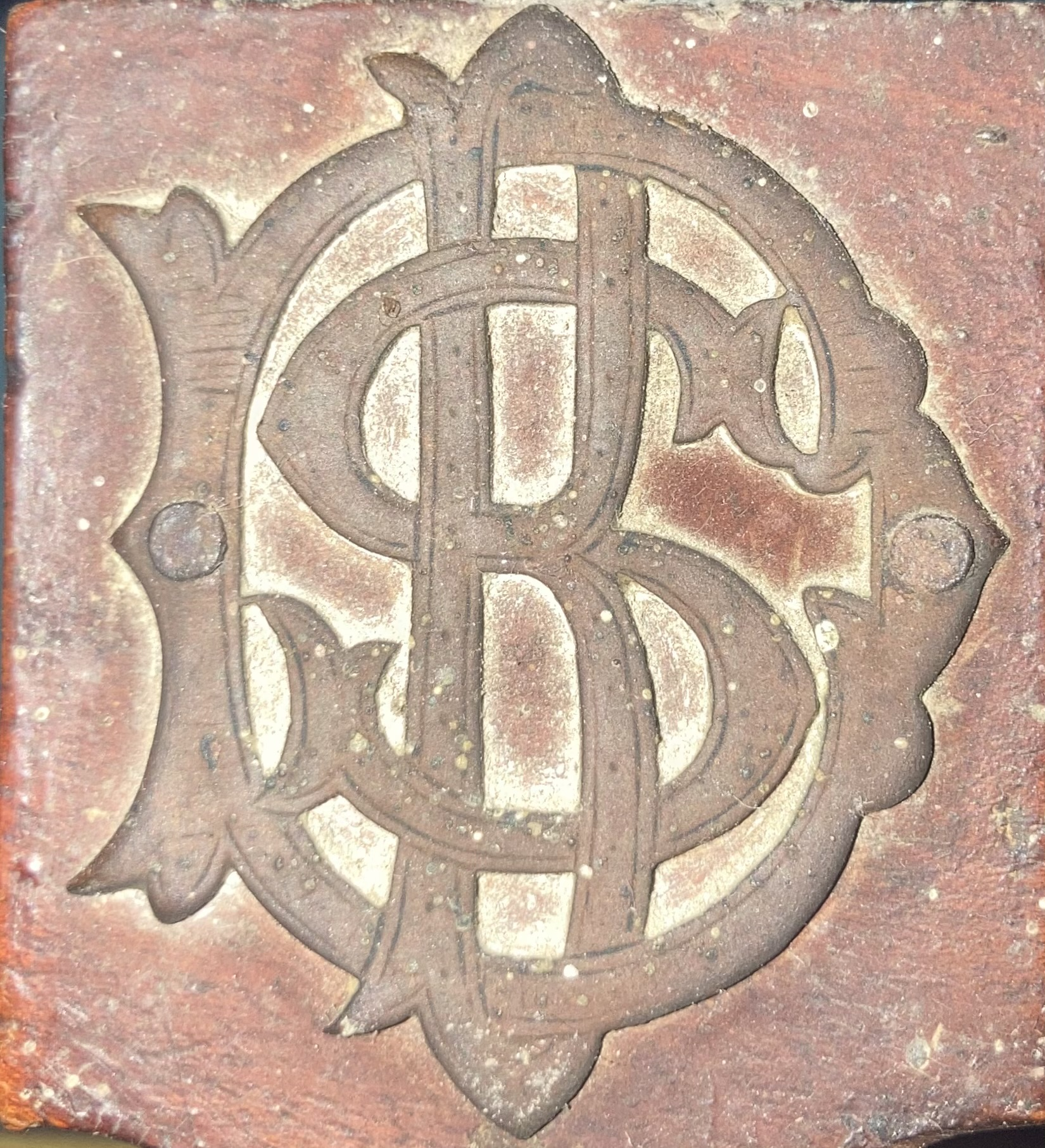
Insignia of Braja Sundar Das

After the creation of Odisha as a separate Indian state in 1936, Braja Sundar Das was nominated as a member of the First Advisory Council of the state by the first Governor, Sir John Austin Hubback.

On 15 August 1943, Braja Sundar Das introduced a bill in the Orissa Legislative Assembly to establish Odia as an official language for use in courts. He also served as a representative of the Orissa Jamidars' Association. Additionally, he was a member of the committee formed to investigate and report on illegal and exploitative administrative practices, including Rasad, Magan, Bethi, and Beggari.

== Literary, social, and cultural contributions ==
Braja Sundar Das made diverse contributions to promote Odia literature and culture in the 20th century. In 1906, he founded the magazine Mukura, a literary publication featuring articles, stories, and poems on a wide range of topics, including nationalism, philosophy, history, religion, culture, science, social reform, and linguistics. The works published in Mukura carried a patriotic undertone, emphasizing the urgent need to rescue the Odia language and identity from its dire state.

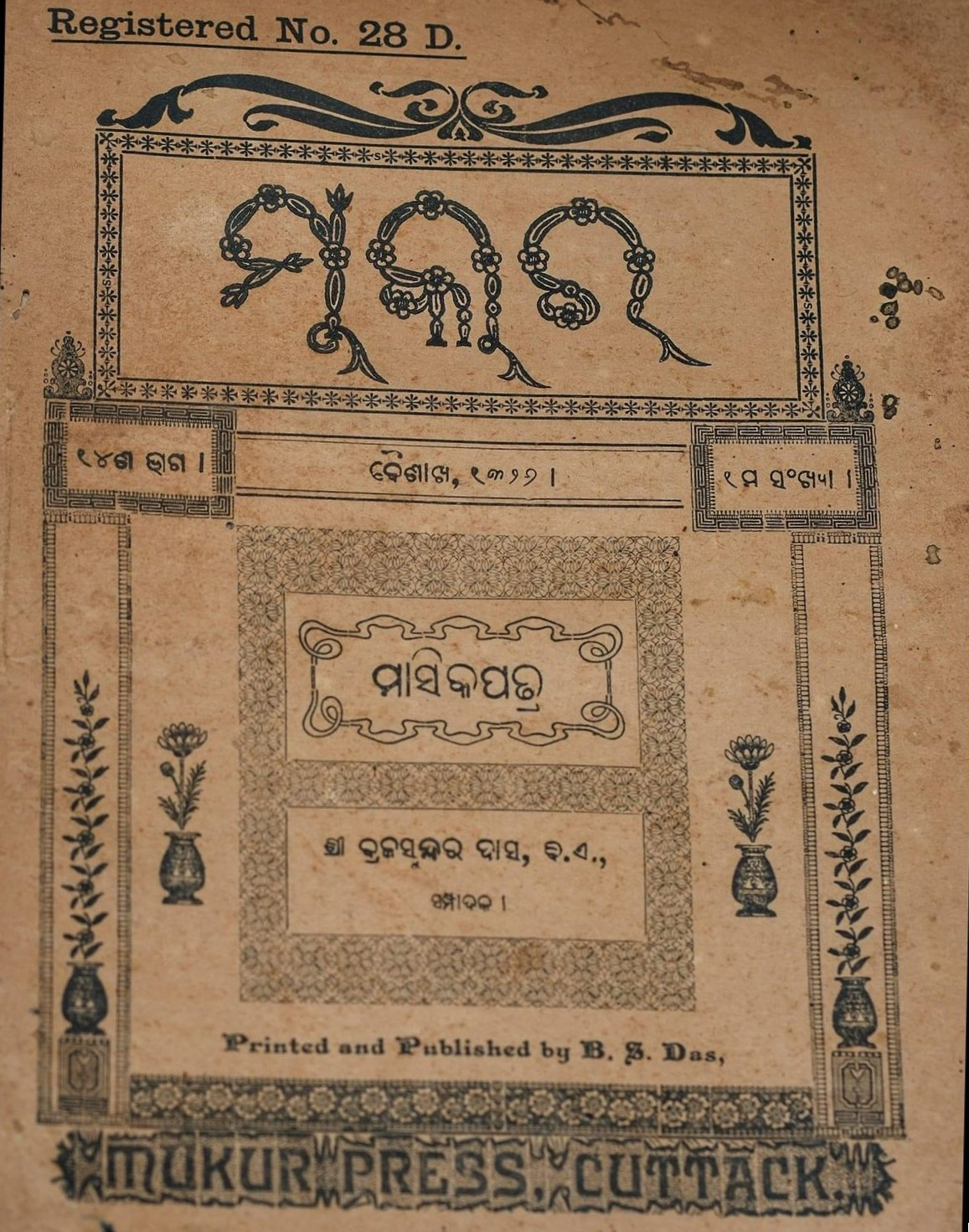
Cover page of the Mukura Magazine

Mukura stood on par with Utkal Sahitya and was a pivotal instrument for disseminating new ideas and literature. Freedom fighters of the time used Mukura as a platform to spread nationalistic sentiments among the general public. It was, in fact, the first literary magazine to focus on nationalistic literature, laying the groundwork for the establishment of many subsequent newspapers.

Under the patronage of Brajasundar, a weekly, "Satya Samachar", was published. It was edited by Biswanath Kar and Gopal Chandra Praharaj.

Braja Sundar Das inherited his passion for publishing from his family; his grandfather, Harekrushna Das, was associated with the Cuttack Printing Company, a pioneering establishment founded by Gourishankar Ray and patronized by T.E. Ravenshaw. Braja Sundar himself was the director of the company for a long period.

In 1910, Braja Sundar Das purchased a press from Puri and set up a type foundry using an attractive lead type considered the best in Odisha at the time. As a result, Mukur Press was published at Bhashakosh Lane in Cuttack. Later editions of Mukura were printed at the Mukura Press Premises, established by Das in Bhashakosh Lane, Cuttack.

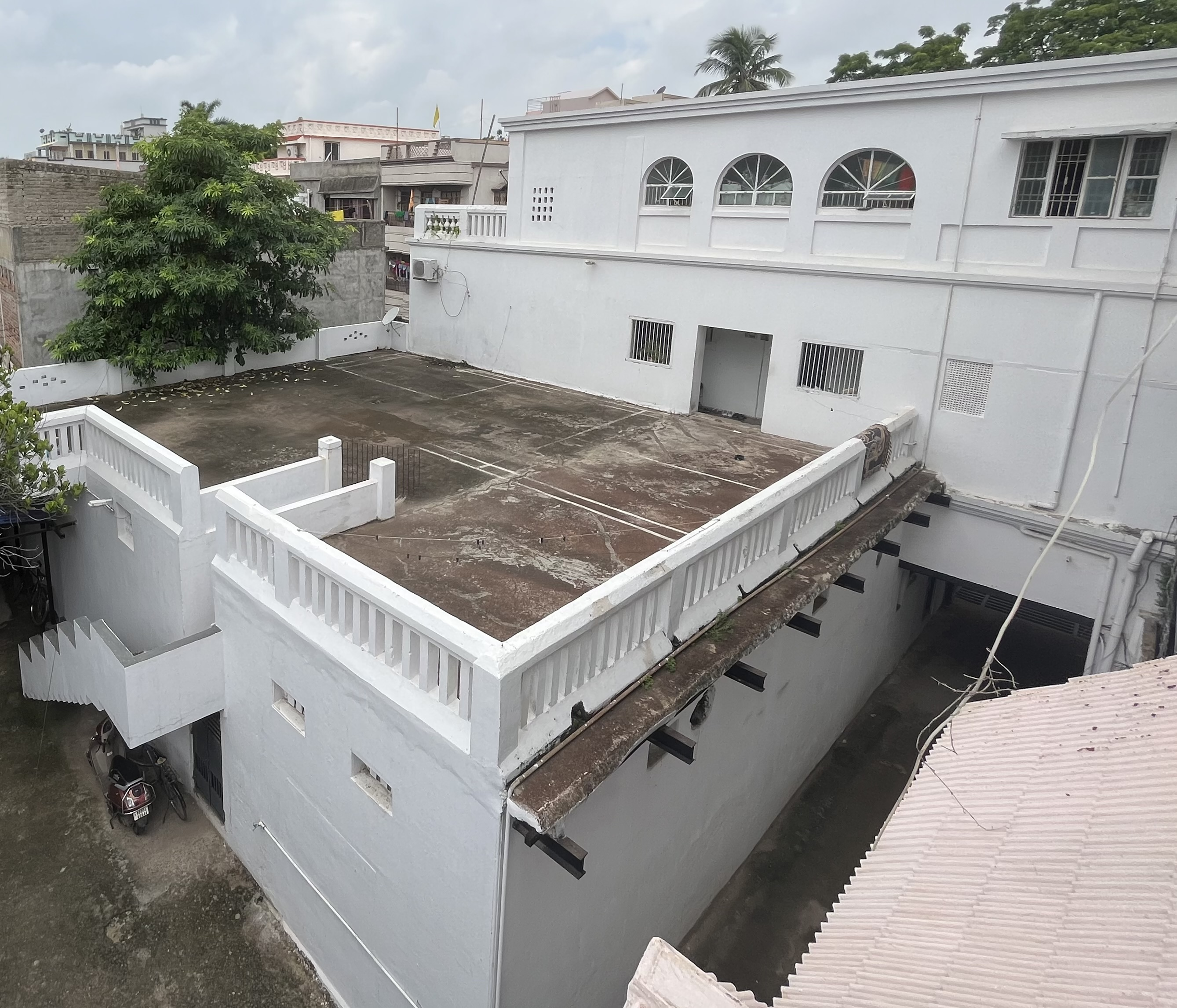
Aerial view of the Mukura Press, established by Das in Cuttack, Odisha

Through Mukura and the Mukura Press, Braja Sundar Das not only published distinguished literary works but also provided a platform for young talent, many of whom would go on to become literary giants in the Odia language. One notable example is Godabarish Mahapatra, whose poem "Banapur" (1915) caught Braja Sundar's attention. Das helped publish the poem, launching Mahapatra's literary career.

Similarly, when Harekrushna Mahatab planned to launch The Prajatantra to further Congress ideals and stir nationalistic fervor, he faced challenges in finding a publishing house. Although Mahatab was hesitant to approach Braja Sundar due to the latter's ideological differences with the Congress party, Das agreed to publish the journal as a gesture of Odia unity. Thus, The Prajatantra was launched and published at Mukura Press.

Das also played a key role in promoting Gopal Chhotray as an eminent litterateur. In 1941, the British Government had appointed Braja Sundar Das as the Chairman of the War Front, tasking him with garnering mass support. As part of this effort, Das organized a one-act playwriting competition to educate the public. Renowned participants included Aswini Kumar Ghose and Kalicharan Patnaik, but it was the young Gopal Chhotray who impressed Braja Sundar with his play "Sagarkanya." Das declared Chhotray the winner on the spot and suggested renaming the play "Sahadharmini." Years later, Chhotray expanded the play into a full-length work titled Sadhana in 1967.

Many young intellectuals began their literary careers through Mukura, making this period known as the Satyabadi Era for its literary and cultural significance.

Braja Sundar was also a founding member of the Orissa Olympic Association, which was central to the establishment of the Barabati Stadium at Cuttack.

Braja Sundar, along with Prof. Laxmi Kanta Choudhury, Prof. Artaballav Mohanty, and Laxminarayan Sahoo, established the "Utkal Sangeet Samaj" to propagate and encourage Odissi dance and music.

Das, as the President of the Utkal Sahitya Samaj, outlined measures to establish a School of Art, as envisioned by Bipin Behari Choudhury. He was also the President of the Working Committee of the Orissa State People's Conference in 1931, which was aimed at looking over the all round development of education, health, agriculture, trade and industry in the state.

== Death and legacy ==
Braja Sundar Das died on 9 June 1944. His collection of poems was later compiled in a memorial book titled "Brajasundara Smaraka". In 1960, Sriram Chandra Bhaban unveiled an oil painting of his portrait to honour his legacy. In 1987, through the generous donations of his family and the local public, the Braja Sundar Higher Secondary School was established, the first of its kind in the Jajpur region.
