= Mukura =

Mukura ମୁକୁର
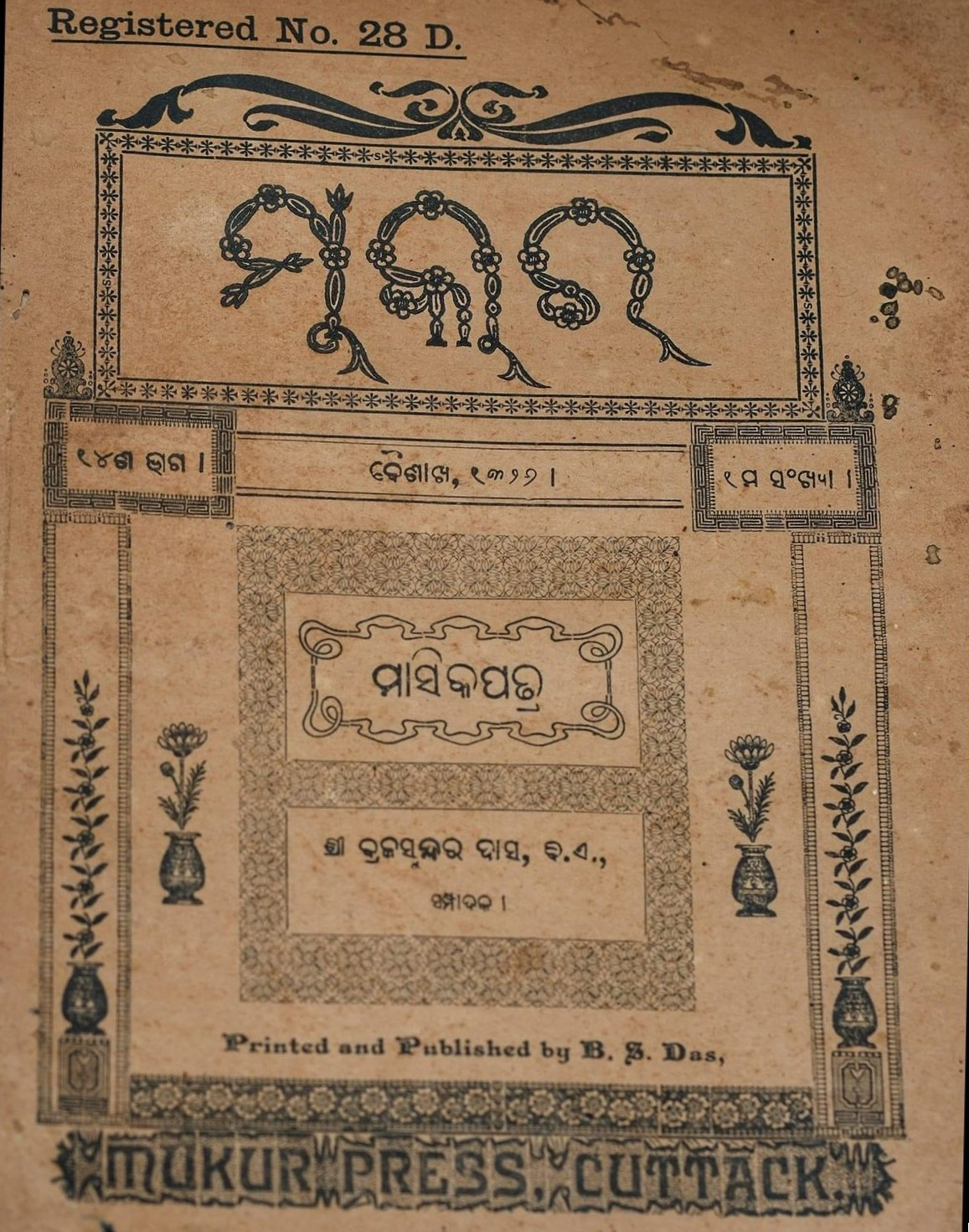
- Cover of Mukura magazine
- Editor: Braja Sundar Das
- Frequency: Monthly (1906–1930)
- Publisher: Mukura Press
- Founded: 1906
- First issue: 1906
- Country: India
- Based in: Cuttack
- Language: English, Odia
- Website: mukura.in

Mukura was a 20th century Odia magazine. It was founded by Braja Sundar Das in 1906 in Cuttack, Odisha and was published for about 25 years, with its last issue in 1930. Braja Sundar Das was the editor of this magazine. It cost Rs. 2 at the time.

Mukura was a literary magazine having articles, stories, and poems on nationalism, philosophy, history, religion, culture, science, social reform, and linguistics, among other subjects. The works published in Mukura carried a patriotic undertone, emphasising the need to rescue the Odia language and identity from its dire status.

It played a central role in lobbying for the amalgamation of Odia-speaking areas; a long struggle that culminated in the creation of Odisha as a separate state on April 1, 1936 (Utkala Dibasa). It functioned at par with Utkala Sahitya Samaja and held the distinction of an important instrument for the dispersion of new ideas and literature. In fact, Mukura was the first literary magazine focussing on nationalistic literature, setting the stage for the establishment of many newspapers. Many young intellectuals started their literary career through Mukura. This phase is referred to as “Satyabadi Era”

Mukura was initially printed in Cuttack Mission Press. In 1910, Braja Sundar Das purchased a press from Puri and began a type of foundry using a more attractive lead type that was considered the best in Odisha. Thus, the later editions of Mukura were printed in Mukura Press Premises, established by Das, in Bhashakosha Lane, Cuttack.

Literary luminaries who contributed extensively to the magazine were Gopabandhu Das, Phakir Mohan Senapati, Mrutyunjaya Ratha, Madhusudan Das, Sribaschha Panda, Nilakantha Das, Kuntala Kumari Sabat, Dayanidhi Mishra, Jagabandhu Sing, Krupasindhu Mishra, among others.

There was an upsurge in the demand for novels at the turn of the 20th century, with more than about 250 novels being published between 1920 and 1947. In 1923, Braja Sundar Das launched a series of publications under Mukura, called “Mukura Upanyasamala” (Mukura Novel Series).

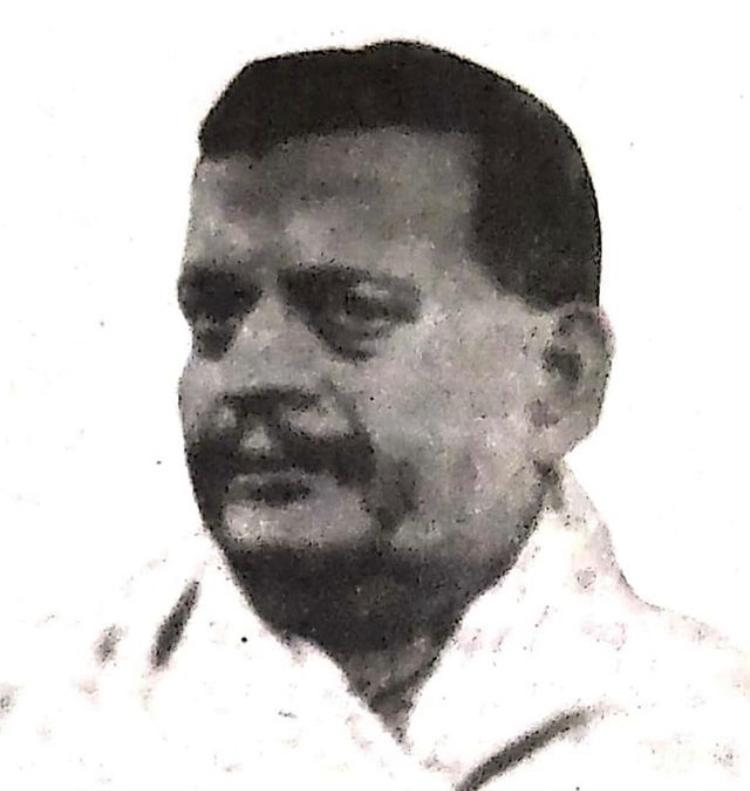
Braja Sundar Das - founder and editor, Mukura

Through Mukura and Mukura Press, Braja Sundar Das, not only published distinguished literary pieces but also offered a platform to young talent who would later be helmed as literary giants in the Odia language. One such example is Godabarish Mahapatra. “Banapur”, the poem written by Mahapatra in 1915, got the attention of Braja Sundar Das who helped publish this piece and launched a young Godabarish Mahapatra into Odia literature. This established a rooted relationship where Mukura Press published “Pravat Kusum” (Morning Flowers), an anthology comprising Mahapatra’s poems. Similarly, “The Prajatantra”, started by Harekrushna Mahatab, was first launched and published in Mukura Press.

Mukura promoted tourism and regional awareness by publishing a series of works by Mrutyunjaya Rath under the heading “Tippani” (Notes). Rath combined a tourist’s curiosity with poetic sensitivity while writing about the various places in Odisha that he visited. These places included Mahabinayaka, Lalitagiri, Udayagiri, Dhauli, etc.

An excerpt from his commentary on Nilamadhab at Kantilo:

“Looking at it from the village, the cloud-kissing compound walls of the temple give the illusion of a five-storied palace. The picturesque situation of Nilamadhab pleases the mind and the eyes exceedingly. On one side the blue flow of the Mahanadi and its vast sand beds, and on the other, the blue-wooded hills. As the temple appears wonderfully beautiful from a distance, so also the vast carpeted surrounding below appears equally pleasing.”

— Mrutyunjaya Rath, Tippani (Notes)

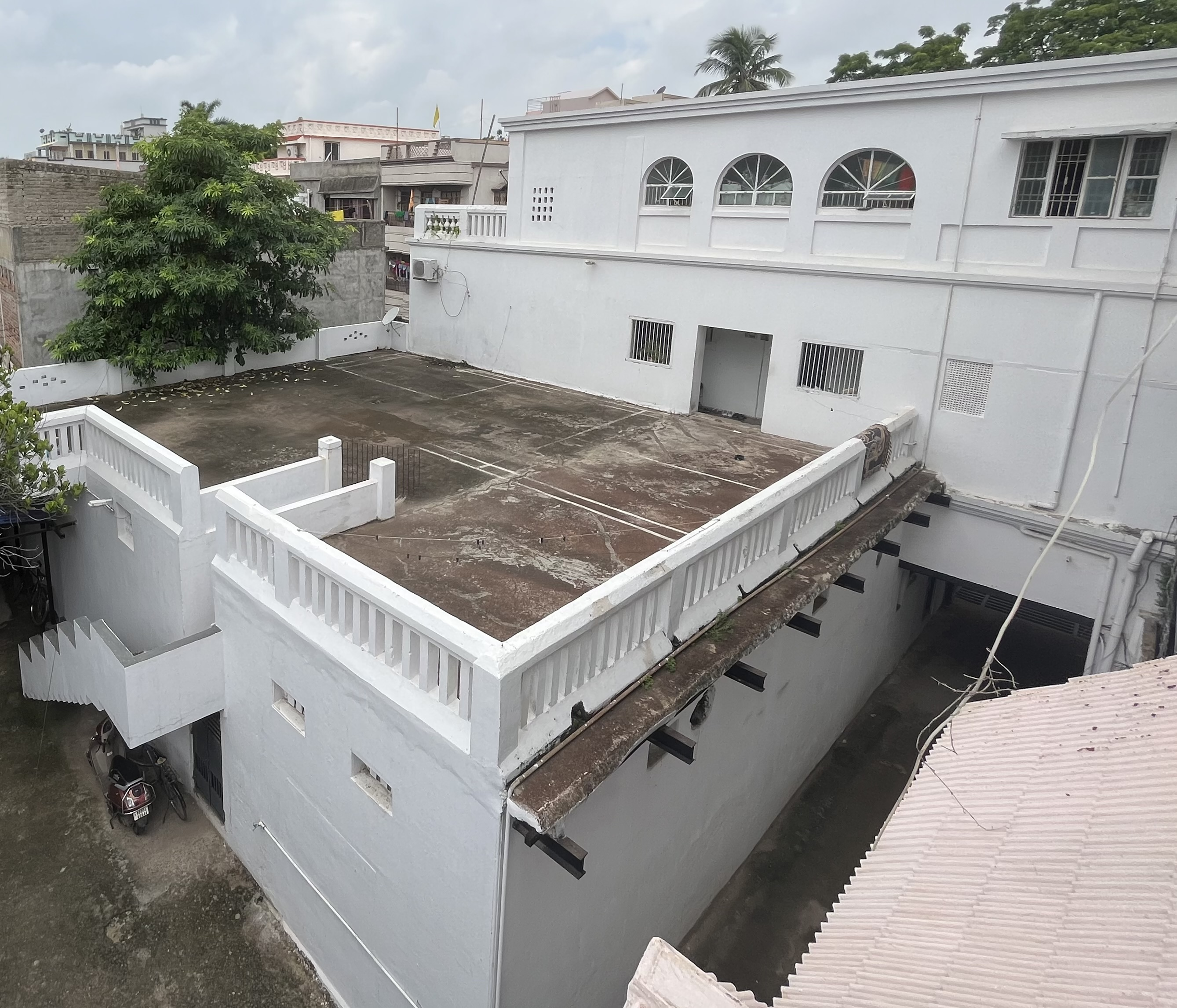
Mukura Press - established by Brajasundar Das in 1910 at Bhashakosh Lane, Cuttack

Mrutyunjay Rath’s study of Sarala Mahabharata, the first serious intellectual engagement with the medieval composition in Odia literature, was serialised in Mukura in 1911 under the title “Adikabi – Sarala Dasa”. This was later published as a book (Sarala Charita) with a foreword by Braja Sundar Das, the editor of Mukura. Similarly, Gopabandhu contributed many literary pieces to Mukura. One such poem “Sarala Dasa” was published in Mukura in 1906. Brajasundar wrote in Mukura editorial pieces as well as discourses on various topics of socio-cultural, literary, and political interests. Mukura was also the first journal to discuss the works of Bhima Bhoi in 1908 in an effort to expand the reach of Bhoi’s writings, even when elite members of the Odia literati didn’t acknowledge Bhoi’s ideologies.

Madhusudan Das wrote a series of eight poems encouraging people for racial unity. The important exhortations were Janāna (A Prayer), Utkala Santana (Children of Soils), Janani Ra Ukti ( The Statement of Mother), Santana Ra Ukti (The Statement of a Child), Sammilani (Conference) and Jati Itihasa ( History of the Race). All these poems were published as sub-national poems before 1915 by Braja Sundar Das in Mukura Press. Besides literary publications in arts, Mukura was one of the foremost journals to publish articles and prose in science. Some examples of some Scientific articles have been enlisted below:

Aloka (Light)	1906	Light, its propagation and properties, X-rays, radioactive rays, radium and its miraculous properties.
Rasayana Tattwa (Chemical Principles) by Satyakumar Ray	1908	Discusses atom, elements, chemical transformation, phlogiston theory, works of Ray, Boyle and Pristley on combustion and oxygen, chemical composition of air, water, vermilion
Aja Nati Rahasya (ଅଜା ନାତି ରହସ୍ୟ) by Jagannatha Tripathy	1908-09	A multipart series dealing with various scientific questions and explanations presented as lively chats between a grandfather and a grandson. The topics include: vapourisation and condensation of water, clouds, rain, fog, dew; steam engine and trains; Newton, gravitation and Earths revolution, hail stone, rock and soil; pebbles, diamond and glass; lightning, electricity, telegraph.
ଜିଆନାଳ ମହିଲତା ପ୍ରଭୃତି କେତୋଟି ଜୀବିତ ସାର (Earthworm and Other Living Manures) by Gopala Charana Pattnaik	1910	Habit and habitat of earthworms and dung beetles, their role in farming, top soil enrichment, nitrogen fixation by leguminous plants
Bishwabhramana (Travels Around the Universe) by Narayana Prasada Sathiya	1924	An imaginary account of space travel at enormous speed. Describe the objects seen during the travel - Mars, Jupiter, Saturn, Uranus and comets at the boundary of the Solar System

Mukura was published until 1930. Six years later, on April 1, 1936, Odisha was declared as an independent state.

== Revival and contemporary publication ==
After a hiatus of approximately 95 years following the publication of its last known issue in 1930, Mukura was revived in 2025 under the new title ଓଡ଼ିଆ ସାହିତ୍ୟର ମୁକୁର (Odia Sahitya ra Mukura). The revived magazine was published by the Sector-11 Residents’ Association, Cuttack, Odisha, India, and registered with the Registrar of Newspapers for India (RNI) under Registration No. ORORI/25/A2004.

The revived publication was brought out under the editorship of Advocate Gautam Siddique in 2025. It was introduced as a half-yearly, story-based Odia literary magazine, focusing on Odia language, literature, storytelling and creative expression. The revival sought to reconnect contemporary Odia literary readers with the historical legacy of Mukura, originally established in Cuttack in 1906.
