= Odia University =

Public Language Research University in Odisha, India

- ଓଡ଼ିଆ ବିଶ୍ବବିଦ୍ୟାଳୟ
- Motto: Bande Utkala Janani
- Motto in English: I Adore Thee, O Mother Utkala
- Type: Public
- Established: 5 September 2023; 2 years ago
- Chancellor: Governor of Odisha
- Vice-Chancellor: Prof. Satyanarayan Acharya
- Academic staff: 21
- Students: 142
- Location: Satyabadi, Odisha, 752014, India; 19°57′2.87″N 85°48′28.5″E
- Campus: 25 acres (10 ha); Urban
- Website: odiauniversity.ac.in

Odia University, is a state language research university situated in Satyabadi on the eastern coast of Odisha, India.

== Description ==
After the Odia language was recognised as a Classical language of India on 20 February 2014, it was decided to establish a university solely dedicated to the research, promotion and study of Odia literature, linguistics, history, and culture.

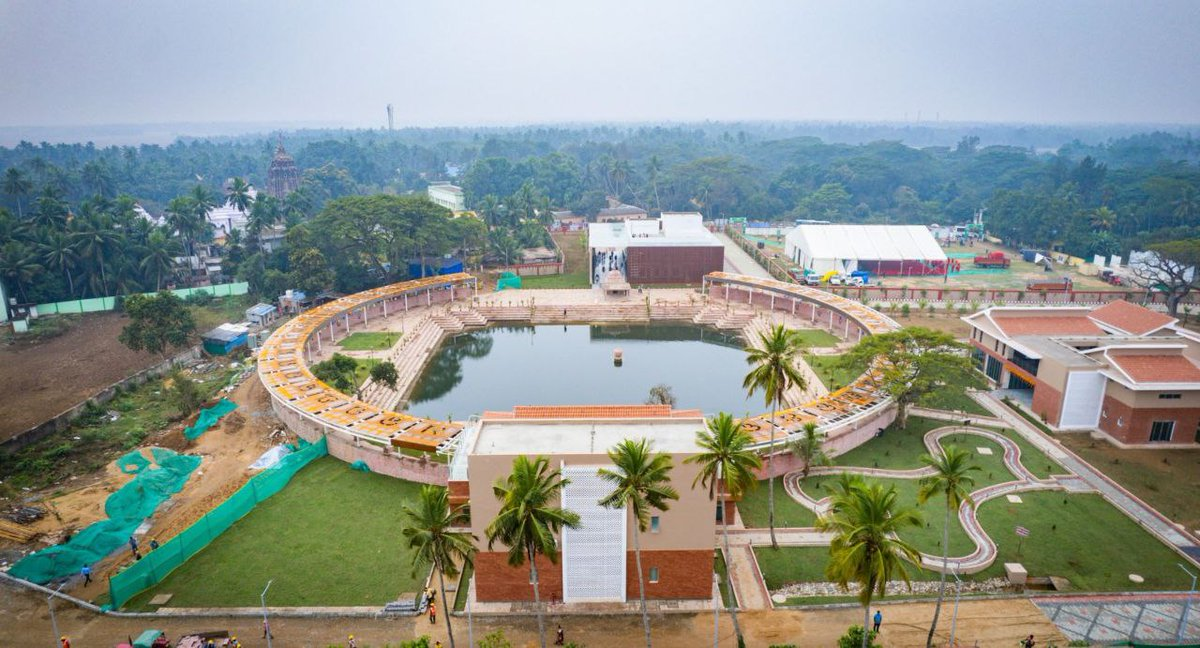
Aerial view of Odia University campus

The Odia University, is established as a language university under the Odia University Act, 2017, passed by the Odisha Legislative Assembly. The university's first academic session began on 5 September 2023.

The permanent campus of the university was inaugurated by Odisha Chief Minister Naveen Patnaik on 24 January 2024 near Satyabadi Bana Bidyalaya which was established by the famous Panchasakha (Pandit Gopabandhu Das, Acharya Harihar, Pandit Nilakantha Das, Krupasindhu Mishra and Godabarish Misra).

== Academics ==
Currently the university offers an integrated M.A. Ph.D. program.

=== Schools ===
- School of Odia Language & Literature
- School of Regional, Tribal Language & Heritage Studies
- School of Linguistics & Natural Language Processing
