= Odisha Day =

Foundation day in the Indian state of Odisha

Map of Odisha

Odisha Day, also Utkala Dibasa, is celebrated on 1 April in the Indian state of Odisha in memory of the formation of the state as a separate state on the linguistic lines (based on Odia language) out of Bihar and Orissa Province with addition of undivided Koraput District and Ganjam District from the Madras Presidency on 1 April 1936. After losing its political identity completely in 1568 following the defeat and demise of the last king Mukunda Dev, efforts resulted in the formation of a politically separate state under British rule on a linguistic basis on 1 April 1936.

== State history ==
The main revolution in this separate state continued for three decades from the very day of formation of Utkal Sammilani that led to the foundation of a separate Odisha Province. The movement turned more intense under the leadership of Utkala Gouraba Madhusudan Das, Utkala mani Gopabandhu Das, Maharaja SriRam Chandra Bhanj Deo, Braja Sundar Das, Maharaja Krushna Chandra Gajapati, Pandit Nilkantha Das, Fakir Mohan Senapati, Dewan Athar Mohammad, Gangadhar Meher, Basudeba Sudhaladeba, Radhanath Ray, Sayeed Mohammed, Bhubanananda Das, A. P. Patro and many others with the support of the public. The newly formed Odisha consisted of six districts namely Cuttack, Puri, Baleswar, Sambalpur, Koraput and Ganjam with its capital at Cuttack. John Austin Hubback took the oath of office and became the first Governor of Odisha Province.

As of 1 April 2019, Odisha has 30 districts.

== Celebration ==
Odisha Dibasa or Utkala Dibasa is celebrated every year on 1 April all over Odisha. It is a day of remembrance for the Odia people. Thousands of stores and Jhankis participate; local politicians arrange events like fireworks competitions. The family of Odia arranges various cultural programs like a sing-song program.

== See also ==
- List of districts of Odisha
