= The Samaja =

Indian Newspaper

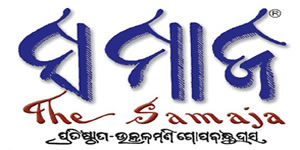

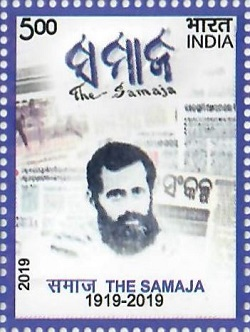
- A 2019 stamp dedicated to the 100th anniversary of The Samaja
- Type: Daily
- Format: Print, online
- Owner: Lok Sevak Mandal
- Founder: Gopabandhu Dash
- Publisher: Sri Rajendra Jena
- Editor: Sri Bamapada Tripathy
- Founded: 1919
- Political alignment: Independent
- Language: Odia
- Headquarters: Cuttack
- Circulation: 3,50,000
- Sister newspapers: samajalive.in
- Website: thesamaja.in
- Free online archives: samajaepaper.in

The Samaja is an Odia daily newspaper published in Cuttack, Odisha, India; started in 1919, it is one of the oldest papers in India. Gopabandhu Das, a prominent freedom fighter and social worker started it as a weekly from Satyabadi in Puri district of Odisha to facilitate the freedom struggle and to revive the moribund Odia language. Under his leadership, and with the support of local people, the paper grew into prominence. In 1928, just before the death of Das, the paper was handed over to Lok Sevak Mandal (Servants of People Society), a non-profit organization started by freedom-fighter Lala Lajapatrai. The society still runs the paper.
