= Mukura Memorial =

Memorial in Uganda

Mukura Memorial is also called Mukura mass grave or Mukura monument is a mass grave where the victims of the 1989 Mukura killings where buried. It has names of the people who were killed inscribed.

== Location ==
Ngora district where Mukura memorial is found

Mukura massacre took place at Okungulo Railway station found in Mukura Town Council, Ngora district which was part of Kumi district.

== Mukura massacre ==
On 7 July 1989, a group of National Resistance Army soldiers camped in Mukura and Ajeluk trading center preparing for operations aimed at searching for rebels. The soldiers constructed their detach at Okungulo railway station.

On 8 July 1989, the operation to search for suspected rebels and rebel collaborators commenced with a work coverage of villages such as Kapir, Mukura, Ngora and other neighboring areas which were the suspected hiding zones. On this day, the soldiers surrounded and arrested people in the morning and the night while some were arrested during the day time.

All the arrested people were collected at Ajeluk Primary school which served as a converging location for the various division units of soldiers and the base for the army commander. While there, the people were screened to separate the suspected rebels from other people using various methods like considering someone with gumboots mark imprinted on his legs or rifle slings marks on shoulder, interrogation, torture.

After the screening process, the captives were matched to Okungulo railway station which is a distance of approximately 4 kilometers from Ajeluk Primary School. On arrival, the captives joined the group of prisoners who were detained at the station. Approximately 300 people were detained at the station which included men, women and children from Mukura and neighbouring places like Orisai, Opegei, Odwarat, Akubui, Okwangami and among others.

On 11 July 1989, National Resistance Army 106 battalion called Pili-pili forced the detained people around 120 men into a train and locked them in a train wagon number C521083. They were suspected to be rebel collaborators fighting against the NRA regime. These people were accused of supporting Uganda People's army rebels.

The people who were trapped and crowded in an abandoned railway train wagon with no ventilation and the door locked at Okungulo railway station for over four hours were later released. Within this period, one of the NRA soldier lit fire close to the wagon which led to increased heat inside the wagon amidst the already existing situation of breathing difficulty to the prisoners inside. On release, 69 of them had suffocated to death, while 47 survived. The 69 people were buried in a mass grave.

== Aftermath ==
After some months, Yoweri Museveni, the president of Uganda paid a visit to Mukura to apologize for the incidence, promised an official burial to the victims and compensation to the bereaved families and other support.

After some time, the bodies of the dead people were reburied in a mass grave in Mukura, this monument has a list of some of the victims of the massacre. Every year on 11 July, the residents hold a memorial prayer to pray and remember the dead.

The government of Uganda constructed Mukura Memorial Senior Secondary School and a public library as a way to pay remembrance to the lost lives.

The families of the massacre victims both those who died in the train and the survivors were compensated by the government.

== See also ==
- Uganda People's Army
- Uganda Railways Corporation
