= Uganda People's Army =

Rebel group and faction in the War in Uganda (1986-94)

- Leaders: Peter Otai; Hitler Eregu
- Dates active: 1987 – 1992
- Ideology: Iteso interests

The Uganda People's Army (UPA) was a rebel group recruited primarily from the Iteso people of Uganda that was active between 1987 and 1992. The UPA was composed mostly of former soldiers in the special forces of the Uganda National Liberation Army and opposed the National Resistance Army (NRA) government of Yoweri Museveni, who took power in January 1986. Reaching a height after the widespread cattle raid by Karamojong in 1987, the UPA rebellion eventually ended through the mediation of the Teso Commission.

== Origin ==
In the 1970s, President Idi Amin Dada created Iteso Home Guard units specifically to protect the region from raids by Karamojong cattle rustlers. The Home Guards proved to be highly effective and, following Amin's overthrow, was retained as people's militia. In the 1980-1986 Bush War, Iteso militia occasionally fought the rebel National Resistance Army of Museveni alongside units of the regular Uganda National Liberation Army and the Special Force, the paramilitary arm of the Uganda Police Force. Following the fall of Kampala to the NRA in January 1986, defeated UNLA soldiers retreated in disarray to their northern home regions.

With this history, and the region's previous support for Milton Obote in mind, the Special District Administrator (SDA) in Soroti, Lt. Rwakatare-Amooti, ordered the disbanding of the people's militia. The decision was made to round up all former security personnel who had returned to their home villages and confiscate their weapons; a prohibition against moving livestock outside the subregion was enacted, but senior NRA officers flouted this prohibition, selling Teso livestock for a profit elsewhere.

The disbanding of the people's militias led to the creation of a power vacuum along the border with Karamoja, which Karamajong cattle raiders exploited to conduct raids into Teso territory. Despite the worsening security situation, the NRA remained focused on capturing potential security threats to its new authority. This in turn forced many former militia members, police officers, and soldiers to go into hiding, or hide their weapons so they could be used for protection against cattle raiders.

== Insurgency ==
A massive series of cattle raids in 1987 resulted in the removal of nearly all of the cattle, the primary source of wealth in the region. The prohibition against movement of livestock out of the region came to be seen as a draconian act of malice by the Museveni administration, as it ensured cattle would be stolen by raiders while NRA officers reportedly flouted the rule for personal gain. This resentment led to the organization of former security members into the UPA under the command of Peter Otai, once Minister of State for Defense under the second Obote administration. Its members were largely composed of professional soldiers, resembling the Acholi Uganda People's Democratic Army, which was also fighting the NRA government in the north.

Both the NRA and UPA were known for their heavy-handed tactics targeting civilians during the insurgency. On July 11, 1989, the 106th battalion of the NRA allegedly rounded up 300 men from the Mukura Sub-County, Kumi District, among other areas, and incarcerated them in a railcar. The men were suspected of being rebel collaborators against the NRA regime, but later investigations revealed little evidence of such affiliation. The men struggled to breathe in the tight confines. By the time they were released over four hours later, 69 of them had suffocated to death.

In 1990, the Teso Commission was formed to seek an end to the conflict, bearing fruit in 1992 when the insurgency ended.

== Aftermath ==
In the 1996 presidential election, Museveni received a majority of the votes in the Teso region. In June 2003, more than 2000 former members of the UPA, under the command of Musa Ecweru, then Resident District Commissioner of Kasese, and local MP John Eresu reportedly joined the national army as a paramilitary force to combat incursions by the Lord's Resistance Army (LRA), a rebel group that had originated in the Acholi. The LRA had sought out former UPA fighters in the hopes of recruiting them; only after it became apparent that the Iteso were hostile to their presence did the LRA begin attacking the populace.
