= Nilakantha Das =

Indian activist (1884–1967)

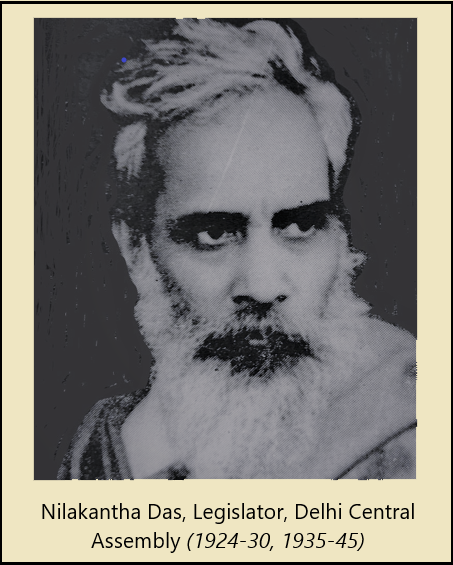
- Born: 5 August 1884; Sri RamachandraPur, Puri, Bengal Presidency, British India
- Died: 6 November 1967 (aged 83); Cuttack, Orissa (now Odisha), India
- Resting place: Pancha-Sakha Cemetery, Sakhigopal, Puri, Odisha
- Education: B.A., Ravenshae College; M.A., Calcutta University
- Occupations: Legislator, litterateur, social reformer, philosopher, freedom fighter, teacher
- Years active: 1903–1964
- Known for: Role at Satyabadi School; Formation of Odisha Province; Research on Odia Language; Writing an Interpretation of Gita; Speaker of Odisha Assembly (1957-1961)
- Notable work: Odia Sahityara Krama Parinama; Konarke; Gita Prabesha; Atma Jibanee; NabaBharat (periodical)
- Spouse: Smt. Radhamani Debi (1894-1980)
- Honours: Padma Bhusana, Govt. India; D. Litt., Utkal University; Sahitya Akademi Award, Central Sahitya Akademi, India

Pandit Nilakantha Das (5 August 1884 – 6 November 1967) was an Odia politician, writer, and educator. He was active during the period when Odia political leaders were seeking a separate Odisha province and recognition for the Odia language.

Das served as headmaster of Satyabadi Bana Bidyalaya, a school founded by Gopabandhu Das, and later served as a member of the legislature. He participated in the Indian independence movement and was a contemporary of Mohandas Gandhi, Motilal Nehru, and Rajendra Prasad.

Odisha Province was established in 1936, the first province in India to be formed on a linguistic basis. Das was among those who advocated for its creation in the central legislature.

He also conducted research on the history of the Odia language. Odia was later granted classical language status in India, becoming the sixth language to receive this designation and the only Indo-Aryan language other than Sanskrit to hold it as of 2024.

He is referred to by some as Utkala Guru.

== Life history ==
=== Early life and education (1884–1911) ===
Nilakantha Das was born in the village of Sri Ramachandrapur, near Puri, Odisha, on 5 August 1884, into a Brahmin family. His grandfather had been a landowner and village headman but died at the age of 28, and the family subsequently lost their property under the Sunset Laws imposed by the British government for tax collection. As a result, his father, Ananda Das, was unable to pursue higher education.

After completing middle school in his village, Das attended Puri Zilla School and briefly studied at Ravenshaw Collegiate School. He completed a bachelor's degree in Chemistry and Philosophy from Ravenshaw College, Cuttack, and later studied for an MA in Literature and Philosophy in Calcutta. He also undertook legal studies but did not complete the degree. His education was funded through scholarships.

=== Influence of Pandit Gopabandhu Das ===
During his high school days, Nilakantha came under the strong influence of Pandit Gopabandhu Das, whom he always respected deeply and regarded as his mentor. Along with Acharya Harihara and another friend, he took a vow with Gopabandhu on the banks of river Bhargavi near Puri, not to accept any jobs under the British Government, and to dedicate their lives for the service of their motherland. They worked together on relief efforts in several flood and cholera-devastated areas, both in Nilakantha's student days and afterwards. Throughout Gopabandhu's lifetime, Nilakantha sought his advice before taking any major step, and worked as his right-hand man - trying to translate Gopabandhu's visions into reality.

=== Headmaster of Satyabadi School (1911–1918) ===
Gopabandhu Das established the Satyabadi Bana Bidyalaya in 1909, and Nilakantha Das travelled to Calcutta to study for his MA before joining the school. The school was modelled on the ancient gurukula tradition and set in a forested area. It opened in 1911 with 19 students, with the 27-year-old Nilakantha Das serving as headmaster, or kulapati. Acharya Harihara Das and Krupasindhu Mishra were among his colleagues, and Godabarish Mishra later joined as a teacher.

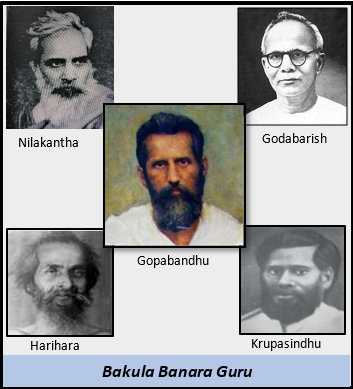
Pancha Sakhas - The renowned teachers of Satyabadi Bana Bidyalaya

The school admitted students regardless of caste or economic background, and children of different backgrounds lived and studied together on campus. This drew opposition from some orthodox Brahmins in the area, who burned the school building. Classes subsequently continued outdoors in the surrounding Bakula Bana until a brick building was constructed. The school was affiliated with Calcutta University and held its first matriculation examination in 1914. The period from 1911 to 1921 is referred to as the "Satyabadi Era" in Odia cultural history. Nilakantha Das left the headmaster position in 1918 and remained associated with the school until 1920.

Sir Ashutosh Mukherji, Vice Chancellor of Calcutta University, visited the school and subsequently offered Nilakantha Das a position as professor of Oriya and Comparative Philosophy at Presidency College. He took up the post in September 1920 but left after three months to participate in the Indian independence movement and in efforts to unite Odia-speaking regions into a single province.

=== The legislator and litterateur (1921–1964) ===
After leaving the professorship at Calcutta University, Nilakantha started his work in Sambalpur in January 1921. Under the leadership of Gopabandhu, he aimed to observe the conditions of local people, encourage their spirits, and help and unite them in various ways. He stayed in Sambalpur for nine months, helped dealing with an outbreak of cholera there, and published a magazine called "Seba" (Service). He established a very good High school there with the help and cooperation of many prominent local leaders. Moreover, Nilakantha led grass-root efforts to bring other bicchinna or annexed Odia speaking regions in Bihar with frequent trips to those areas as well.

Gopabandhu Das soon realized the lack of strong Odia representation in Delhi Central Legislative Assembly to champion Odia causes. On his advice, Nilakantha contested and was elected to the Central Assembly from Odisha in 1924, with three main objectives:

1. To amalgamate (unite) all the Oriya-speaking tracts under one province
2. To bring all-around development of Odisha and India, and
3. To fight British Imperialism from within.

In no time, he established himself as a powerful legislator in the Central Assembly in Delhi, and introduced many bills on behalf of Odisha, including the bill to repeal the Salt Tax on its people, and several bills for the formation of an independent Odisha Province. He worked tirelessly, with an undaunted spirit, on these issues. He also worked on improving the wages and living standards of labourers in various fields.

He retired from the Central Assembly and came to Odisha in 1945, and from 1945 to 1951 devoted his time primarily to literary pursuits. Later he joined as a legislator and speaker of the Odisha Assembly, and continued till 1961. He wrote his autobiography in 1963, for which he received India's Central Sahitya Akademi award in 1964. He died on November 6, 1967, at Cuttack.

The following sections elaborate the specifics of Nilakantha's work in the arena of his state and his country.

== Formation of independent Odisha ==
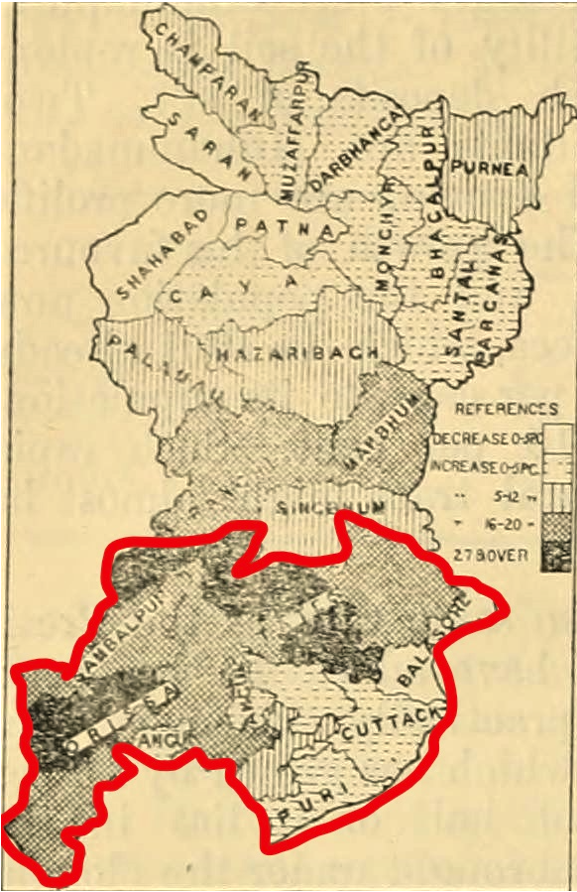
Map of Amalgamated Orissa (in Red border) with Bihar before 1936

The context for the creation of an Independent Odisha (then known as Orissa) province is as follows: During the Nineteenth century and first part of the Twentieth century, the once-proud Odisha, which did not come under a full British takeover until 1803, was subsequently dismembered and annexed by the British to four neighboring states, namely: Bengal, Bihar, Central Province (Madhya Pradesh) and Madras, and governed by the corresponding British presidencies. Originally, only the coastal districts, namely: Balasore, Cuttack, Puri, and areas nearby made-up Odisha, which was placed under Bihar/Patna jurisdiction. (The map in this section shows the amalgamated Orissa, outlined in red, before 1936.) Because of their linguistically minority status, the Odias in the annexed regions faced discrimination in jobs and academics and their children were not taught Odia in schools, which stifled the self-identity of Odias, and resulted in the drainage of financial resources of Odisha as well. So, for a long time, from 1880s, many prominent and concerned Odias wanted to amalgamate all Odia speaking regions under one administration. Madhusudan Das made it a prime issue for Odias through his Utkala Sammilani.

Nilakantha was greatly inspired by Madhusudan Das's goal for the amalgamation (unification) of all Odia speaking regions under one administration by first attending his Utkala Sammilani in 1903 and then meeting directly with him in 1904. In 1917, Nilakantha presided over the Manjusha session of Utkala Sammilani and greatly helped in strengthening the demand for amalgamation of scattered Odia-speaking tracts including undivided Koraput, Ganjam, Paralakhemundi etc. of that time. This proposal is not the same as having an independent Odisha province, for which the proposed state must be financially independent. That requirement could not be fulfilled by Odisha, especially since the annexed areas were quite underdeveloped and poor. So Madhusudan and other prominent leaders of this movement (such as: Maharaja Shri Krushna Chandra Gajapati of Paralakhemundi), were willing to just put the cash-stripped amalgamated Odia-speaking regions as a sub-province under a single governing state, preferably Madhya Pradesh.

But Nilakantha was not satisfied with a sub-province status for Orissa, where it would still be subordinate to the governing state. After being elected to the Delhi Central Assembly in 1924, he became instrumental in creating the current independent Odisha Province, not just an amalgamated region or sub-province, in the important ways described below.

=== Introduction of legislative bills ===
When Nilakantha, as a member of the Congress party, first tried to introduce the legislative bill informally for creating an independent Odisha Province, he did not get much support from top leaders in the Congress party. Pandit Motilal Nehru, due to other priorities, opposed its presentation to the British Government. So Nilakantha organized mass processions in Calcutta and other places denouncing this attitude of the Congress party.

Then Nilakantha bypassed many other hurdles in the Central Assembly and finally moved a resolution there in 1927, which asked for All Oriya-speaking tracts to be put under one local administration, in the form an independent, linguistically-based Orissa Province, claiming that "otherwise Odias won't be satisfied and agitations would continue."

He also reintroduced the resolution in All India Congress session in 1929 in spite of opposition at central level, and rejected an offer of Sir title by Alexander Muddiman, Finance Secretary, Government of British India, to accept Odisha as a sub-province. Nilakantha also wrote several articles in The Statesman and The Bombay Chronicle on the formation of separate provinces on linguistic basis. Finally, Mahatma Gandhi mediated on the subject so that the bill was forwarded for further consideration in the Round Table Conference and by the British Parliament.

=== Inclusion of southern Odisha regions ===
Nilakantha Das was responsible for the inclusion of southern regions, including Koraput, Paralakhemundi and Ganjam up to Chilika, in Odisha when it was formed on April 1, 1936. Until then those regions were under the Telugu-speaking part of the Madras State. A meeting was arranged by the "Andhra Eastern Culture Research Committee" on 16 June 1927 at Mukhalingam, where the committee wanted to establish the cultural root of those areas in the Telugu region and keep it in Madras. But Nilakantha presented historical facts and concrete evidence to the contrary, based on his in-depth research on the cultural heritage of the Southern Odisha regions, which the Andhra committee could not refute and was forced to relinquish its claim once for all.

=== Formation of language-based Odisha Province ===
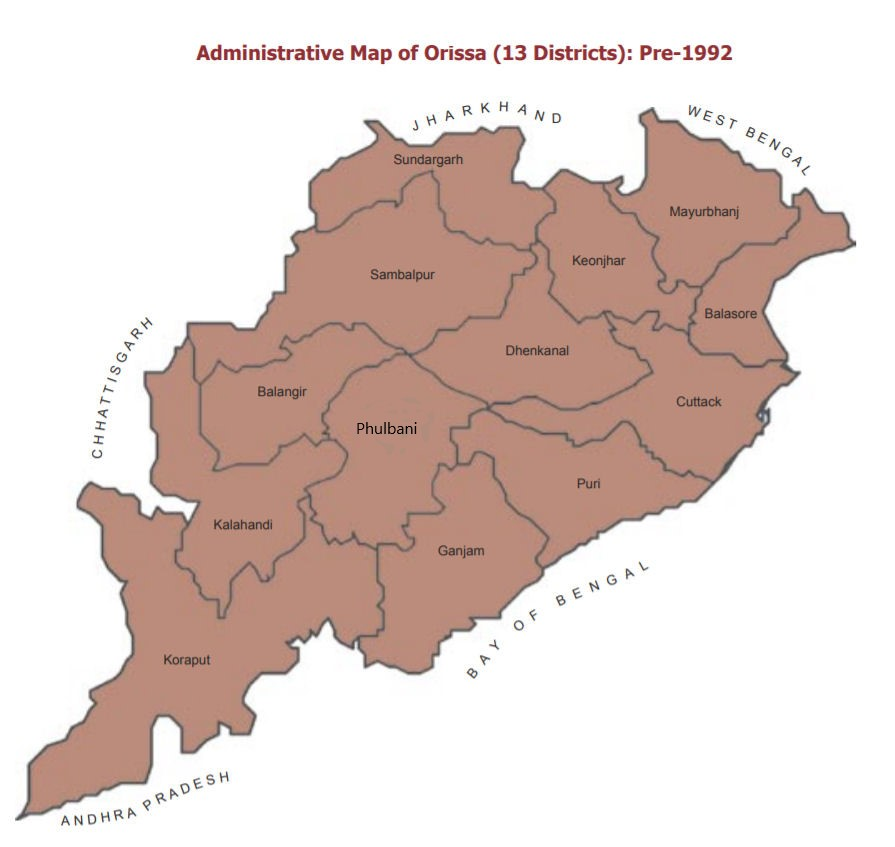
Map of Independent Odisha Province with 13 districts (after merger of Princely states in 1949)

It was Nilakantha's irrefutable arguments and efforts in the Delhi Central assembly that finally resulted in dropping the "financial independence" requirement for creating an independent Odisha State. He successfully argued that the poverty and underdeveloped nature of the annexed areas should be an important reason for bringing them to Odisha and improving their condition concurrently with the rest of the state.

He had also prepared and submitted a memorandum to the O' Donnell committee, which constituted the foundation for the formation of the independent Odisha Province. Unfortunately, annexed areas in Bihar (Sadheikala and Kharasuan) were not given approval for this merger due to some unanticipated political problems at the last minute.

Finally, the modern Odisha was born on April 1, 1936, as the first Indian province to be created on a linguistic basis, and with an initial grant of Rs. 40 lakhs from the Central Government to defray its financial deficits. The princely states of Odisha initially wanted to stay independent of the Odisha Government, but were integrated into it by 1949, and the 13-district Odisha was formed.

Madhusudan Das, who died in February, 1934, was not alive to see the formation of this new, independent Odisha Province, but prior to his death he expressed his full confidence in Nilakantha in carrying on his legacy and bringing his dreams to fruition. Nilakantha was later proclaimed as the "Veritable father of Orissa" by Prof. N. G. Ranga, Deputy Leader of the Congress Party in the Indian Parliament (1980–1991).

Upon the creation of the independent Odisha province in 1936, Nilakantha was its presumptive first chief minister, but that did not happen due to certain legislative issues (i.e. Nilakantha was a member of the Central Assembly, not the local one) raised by the local Congress Party.

It may be noted that following Nilakantha's arguments, other Indian states, such as Andhra, were also created on language basis in the post-independent India. Hence, Nilakantha was placed among the Makers of Modern India by Central Education Minister Prof. Nurul Hassan (1972-1977).

=== Creation of Utkal University ===
Even though Odisha was made independent in 1936, it did not have its own university; all its colleges were under Patna University in Bihar. Similarly, the high court was in Calcutta. So, Nilakantha also demanded successfully the creation of Odisha's own independent university and high court, arguing that an independent state must have these basic institutions as fundamental to self-determination. Thus, Utkal University was finally created in 1943, when Pandit Godabarish Mishra was the education minister, and was housed in Ravenshaw College, Cuttack.

== Other legislative work ==
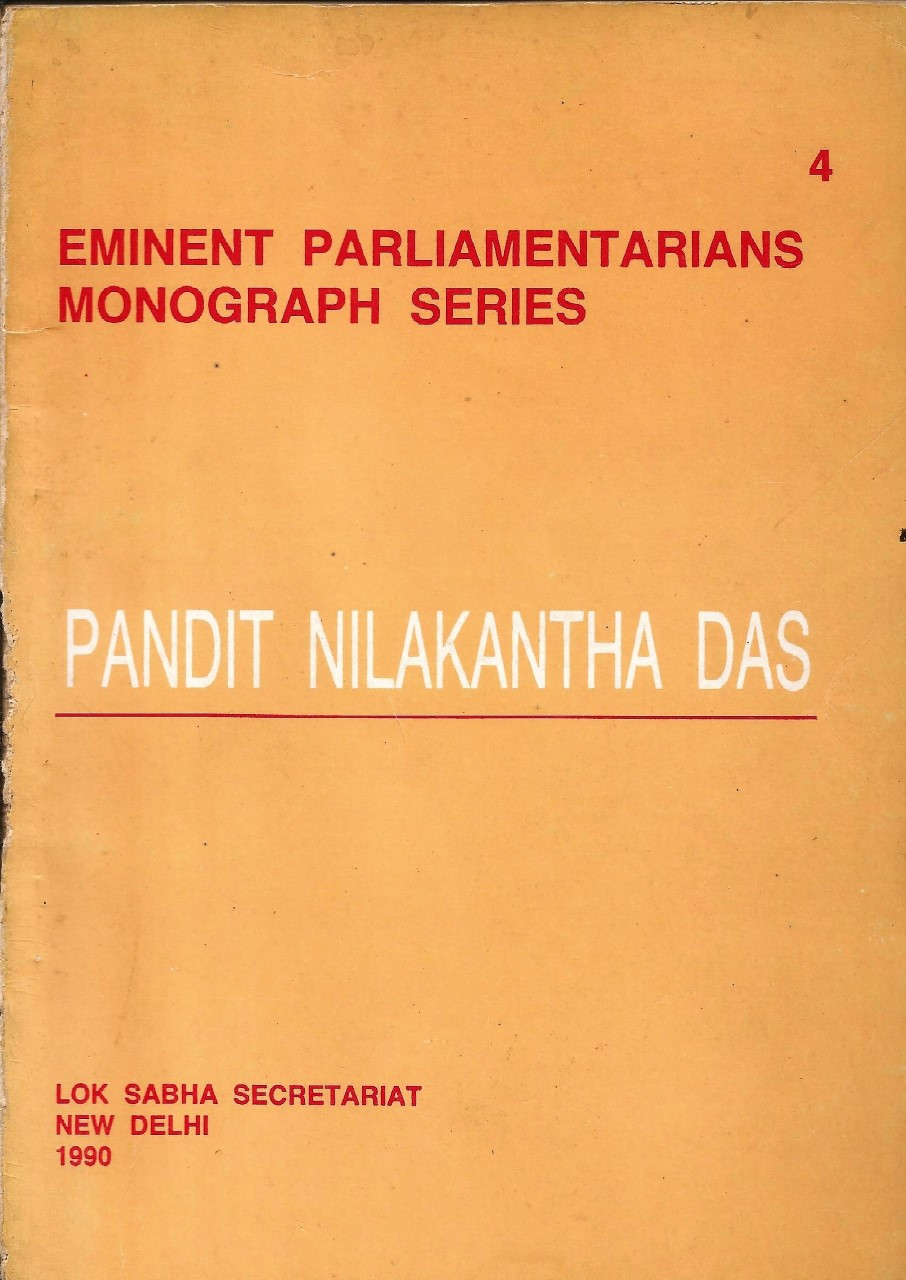
Cover page of Nilakantha's Monograph as "Eminent Parliamentarian"

=== Delhi Central Assembly ===
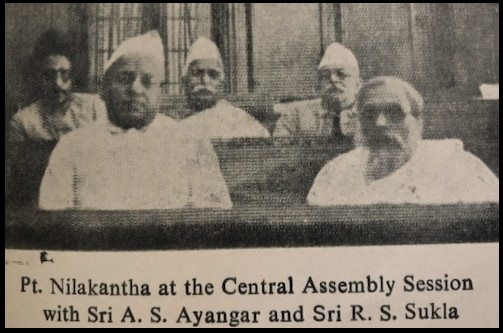
Nilakantha (right) with other renowned leaders in Delhi Central Assembly

Pandit Nilakantha, an eloquent speaker in English, was renowned as a legislator both in Odisha as well as in India. In the Indian arena, he raised many issues of national interest, including the rights of political prisoners, and of non-resident Indians in South Africa. His work and arguments in various issues were regarded quite valuable so as to have them published in the Eminent Parliamentarians Monograph Series of India. The fourth volume in the series, titled Eminent_Parliamentarians_Series_Nilakantha_Das, contains his speeches delivered in the Central Legislative Assembly, while participating in debates on local, national and international issues. Odisha Government has also compiled some of his speeches into a book, titled "Speeches and Remarks of Pandit Nilakantha Das in Central Legislative Assembly" for the benefit of present-day legislators.

B. N. Pande, Governor of Odisha (1983–1988), who had in attended Nilakantha's arguments in the Delhi Assembly, once commented that when Nilakantha spoke, people used to say that "The Lion of Orissa is roaring!"

=== Labour leader ===
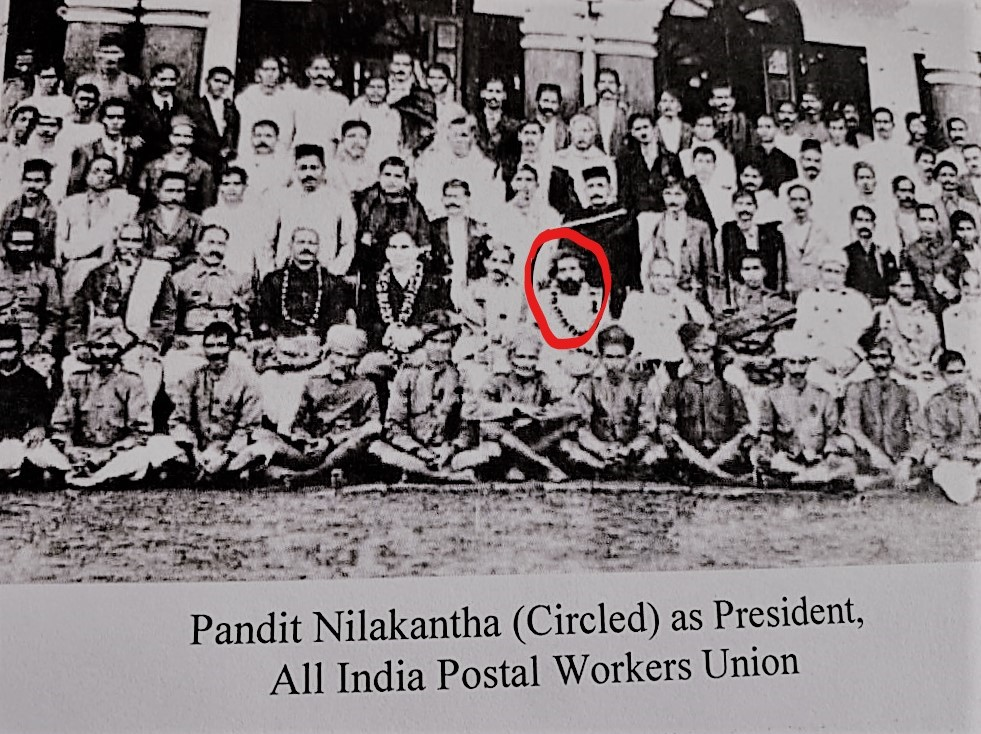
Nilakantha with All India Postal Union Workers

As a central legislator, Nilakantha was very concerned about the plight of labourers in India. He helped in the organization of the plantation workers of Assam Tea Gardens, and the labourers in Jamshedpur, Calcutta and Khidirpore (1929). His cut motion supporting the strike by tin-plate workers in Tata (1928-1930) resulted in the defeat of the Government in the Central legislative assembly. He fought in the Central assembly to remove the disparity of pay between the Indian workers (Rs. 88 per month) and British employees (Rs.1300 per month) for the same work. He also introduced bills related to many safety issues.

Due to his important work in these areas, Nilakantha was made a member of the Indian Railway Purchase Committee, where he introduced many improvements to railway buggies, especially to third class compartments travelled by poor people. He was also elected to the prestigious Central Assembly Public Accounts Committee. In addition, Nilakantha was elected as the "President of the All-India Postal Union" in 1927.

=== Odisha Assembly ===
Pandit Nilakantha retired from the Central Assembly in 1945 and came to Odisha's political arena. The next few years, however, he took leave from politics, devoted himself to literary pursuits, and wrote many of his valuable books. Later, with Pandit Godabarish Mishra, he created his own independent party called the "Swadhina Janasangha" and was elected to Odisha Assembly in 1952. He stayed out of the Congress party politics till 1954, when Pandit Jawaharlal Nehru requested him to rejoin Congress.

In 1957, Nilakantha was re-elected uncontested to the Odisha Assembly, and became the speaker of the Assembly. He stayed in that position till July 1961, although the administration collapsed in Match of that year. As a scholar of the Indian constitution, he brought to the attention of the Government of India and the Law Department the provision in the Indian constitution that "whenever the Assembly is dissolved, the Speaker shall not vacate his office until immediately before the first meeting of the Assembly after the dissolution". (The tradition till then was for the Speaker to leave his office along with the Assembly.) It was finally accepted by the Government of India, and now practiced in all cases of dissolution of the Assemblies in different States.

A chronological account and details of Pandit Nilakantha's legislative contributions, both in Odisha and the Indian sphere, may be found in the PhD thesis on the subject, titled "PANDIT NILAKANTHA DAS, THE LEGISLATOR."

== Indian independence movement ==
After coming to Sambalpur in January 1921, Gopabandhu and Nilakantha started the Satyagraha movement there. Many prominent persons, students and Government servants of the region participated in the movement by their inspiration. Nilakantha then joined the Swaraj Party (or Pro-Changers) of the Central Congress, led by Pandit Motilal Nehru and Chittaranjan Das. After being elected to the Central Assembly in 1924 as a member of the Swaraj Party, he became its Senior Secretary. He came in close contact with many of the Indian freedom fighters while stationed in Delhi and Shimla and worked closely with them for India's independence.

=== Salt tax and salt march ===
The Salt tax, for producing salt from sea water, was doubled by the British Government in 1923, and it very much affected the coastal salt producers of Odisha. Nilakantha made his demands in the Central Assembly in 1929 to repeal this Salt Tax on Odisha. The British Government, however, paid a deaf ear to it, and others at the national level were also not paying much attention to Odisha's problem. So, a rebellion then started smoldering among the peoples of Odisha.

Then Mahatma Gandhi seized upon the idea and made salt tax a national issue - since a tax on salt affected every individual at a basic level. He started his historic Dandi Salt March in 1930, as a demonstration of civil disobedience, in defiance of the salt tax. Gandhi chose Dandi, in Gujarat, as he was more familiar with his own home state. But many Odia leaders joined Gandhi and organized Salt March in Odisha in its coastal areas. Nilakantha led the march in Kakatpur/Astarang area near Puri, for which he was promptly jailed. The Salt Tax on Odisha was later repealed.

=== Imprisonment ===
Taking part in many activities related to the Indian Independence movement, Nilakantha was jailed four times by the British Government, spending a total of more than two and half years there.

1. The first time, in 1923, he was imprisoned for leading agitations for the amalgamation of Odia regions, and sent to the Hazaribagh jail for four months. It is an interesting fact that when Nilakantha was taken from Puri to the prison in Hazaribagh, he refused to be handcuffed like a thief. As King Porus had asked Alexander the Great, Nilakantha demanded to be treated like a gentleman by the authorities. Consequently, he was taken to Hazaribagh without handcuffs, first in a carriage to the railway station, and then in the train being escorted by a sub-inspector of Police.
2. The second time was in 1930, for Civil Disobedience of Salt March. He was jailed in Hazaribagh for six and half months, but was released a little early to participate in the All India Educational Conference held in Banaras.
3. He was again arrested and sent to jail for two months in 1931 for Civil Disobedience.
4. Last time in 1932, as the Congress Organization was declared unlawful by the British, he was jailed for 16 months in Hazaribagh, but was sent to the Patna jail for a period when he became quite sick in Hazaribagh.

Nilakantha's in-depth research, presentation of facts and inspiring speeches had endeared him to many leaders in the Indian political arena, Dr. Rajendra Prasad, Govind Ballav Pant, Acharya Kriplani and Motilal Nehru, to name a few. In the Hazaribagh jail, he interacted closely with some of them as his co-prisoners, and they carried on discussions and plans for the independence of India.

Dr. Rajendra Prasad, later the first President of the Independent India, was a jail-mate of Nilakantha in Hazaribagh. After listening to Nilakantha a few times on his interpretation of the Bhagavad Gita, Dr. Prasad encouraged him to write his discourse on the interpretation of Gita; and so Nilakantha started on this invaluable contribution during his imprisonment. Nilakantha also wrote two of his other books, Dasa Nayak and Labanyabati ra Tika, while in jail.

=== With Gandhi, Nehru and Subhas Bose ===
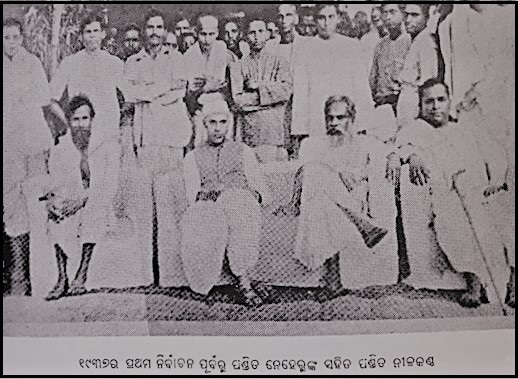
With Pandit Jawaharlal Nehru in 1937, campaigning for Congress at Satyabadi

During Gandhiji's Swarajya movement, upon Gopabandhu's invitation, Mahatma Gandhi first came to Odisha in 1921, and later took seven more trips to its various regions. Nilakantha accompanied him many times to different parts of the state and inspired others to join the movement. As mentioned earlier, upon Gandhi's call, he led the Salt March in Odisha in 1930. He and his wife always wore simple homespun (khaddar) clothes all the time, being inspired by Gandhi.

Nilakantha also worked directly with Jawaharlal Nehru on his trips to the Odisha state after its formation, and accompanied him on many of his trips to various regions of the state to campaign for the Congress party.

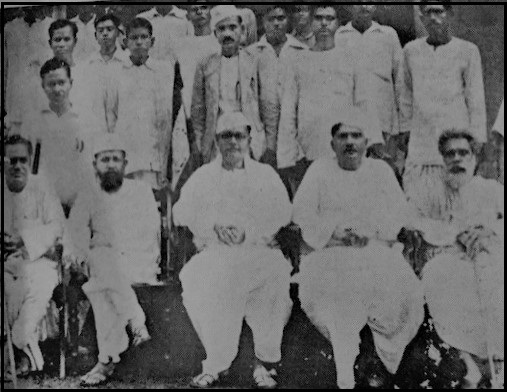
Nilakantha (right) with Subhas Bose (center) in Odisha in 1939

Nilakantha was a supporter of Netaji Subhas Chandra Bose who was born and brought up in Cuttack (and whose father was a close friend of Nilakantha) and arranged several meetings for him in Odisha on his freedom fights using his Indian National Army (INA). Although Subhas Bose was not successful in getting freedom for India and died in 1945, he garnered enough sympathy in the Indian Armed Forces (Army, Navy, Air force) to raise question of their loyalty to the British Government. Consequently, it influenced the crash-stripped British Government's decision to leave India in 1947. But because of his sympathy for Netaji, whom the Central Congress boycotted, Nilakantha was later denied ticket from the Central Congress High Command to seek re-election. Nilakantha did not want to fight against that decision as an independent candidate because of his loyalty to the party at the time.

== Litterateur ==
Nilakantha was equally devoted to the field of Odia literature as he was to an independent state of Odisha and to the cause of Indian Independence. He wrote books and articles in many different fields, of many different genres, with the goal of discovering the foundation of the Odia language and its heritage, as well as to enrich the Odia literature. He had also written many Odia short stories and poems for children. The main theme of most of his literary writings, therefore, was to bring into focus the past glory of the Odia nation and its untainted culture. This, he hoped, would help the children of Odisha get back their lost identity. His poetry works depicts purity of love rather than its glorification by Western ideas foreign to this country.

Nilakantha was a comparative philologist, and his work was the first scientific linguistic study of the Odia language and culture. It contains many facts, which were crucial to prove Odia as a classical language, the sixth in India, with literature from the 14th Century.

=== Famous books ===
- Odia Sahityara Krama Parinama: This is Pandit Nilakantha's masterpiece, for which he researched in-depth for the originality of Odia culture and discussed it thoroughly from many different angles. In this two-part volume, he has attempted to prove the purity of Oriya language, and its independence from other regional languages such as Bengali. Contribution of folklore and Dravidian culture has also been analyzed here. Jagannath dharma and the 'principles of equality' associated with it were shown to be crucial to Oriya identity. Parts of this book have now been translated to English and published in Critical Discourse in Odia.
- Konarke: This highly acclaimed Kavya consists of two parts. In the first part, Ramachandi thare Rati, narrates the reminiscence of the past glories of Odisha by a wakeful teacher (himself) who had taken his young students on an excursion to Konarka and then had to take shelter in a nearby temple at night due to cyclonic weather. The second part, Mayadevi, deals with the episode of the construction of the Sun Temple Konarka by Odia King Narasingha Deva in the memory of his first queen and true love Mayadevi, the daughter of the feudatory king of Sishupala Gada. It was based upon a story narrated to Nilakantha by a local man.
- Kharavela: This Kavya highlights the achievements of the Odia King Kharavela, who restored the self-confidence of Odias after the Kalinga war, more than 2100 years ago, by conquering vast areas of India from north to south and east to west. It also depicts his marriage to Dhusi, the princess of Bajiragriha (a part of current Afghanistan), based upon their bravery in fighting together and defeating the Yavana intruders.
- Atma Jibanee: This autobiography of Nilakantha, written in 1963, is remarkable in the sense it presents an account of the life and times of the then Odia society and the struggle of Odia people scattered in different provinces and feudatory states in the early and mid-twentieth century. It carries the traces of the illustrious lives of Nilakantha and many others to inspire the future generations. It received India's Central Sahitya Akademi award in 1964.
- Gita Prabesha: Nilakantha wrote this discourse on Gita, the prelude to the holy Hindu scripture Gita, while in Shimla (the Summer Capital of the British Government), as a member of the Central Legislature. The book was known to be written in 21 nights. An English Translation of this book is also presently available.
- In addition, his interpretation of Gita, which he started in the Hazaribagh jail as mentioned earlier, was highly acclaimed by critics (placed in the sixth position in all India level at that time). Although Nilakantha was equally proficient in Odia, English and Sanskrit, he wrote it in Odia with the intention of making it available to people in the villages of Odisha, and it became the only reliable version accessible to Odias not proficient in other languages then.

=== Other kavyas and books ===
Nilakantha wrote many other books, both for adults and for children, including two Kavyas as adapted versions of Tennyson, namely Dasa Nayak (Enoch Arden) and Pranayini (The Princess). Among his scholarly writings Sanskruta O Sanskruti, Odia Bhasa O Sahitya, and Arya Jeeban are well-known.

He wrote the three major Indian Epics as Children's Ramayana, Mahabharata and Bhagabata for the children of Odisha in very simple and descriptive language, and several children's books in Odia in the form of stories and poems with rural themes. He also wrote a devotional book named Bhakti Gatha in 1918 for the students of the Satyabadi school for their daily prayer. It contains, along with his own hymns, the Odia translation of a number of hymns from the Vedas and other scriptures.

== Other facets ==
Pandit Nilakantha, from young age, exhibited his powerful, multifaceted personality through his many actions. So he was often fondly called "Satyabadi-ra Savyasachi" (the Savyasachi of Satyabadi), where Savyasachi refers to Arjuna, the most powerful middle Pandava of the Mahabharat, who could shoot arrows using either hand with the same skill and accuracy. Below are some facts on other aspects of him.

=== Pandit (intellectual) ===
Nilakantha's quest for knowledge knew no bound. He was extremely well-versed in many subjects, availing himself of large book collections in the libraries from Calcutta University to Delhi Parliament. He used to spend most part of his nights in reading books as day times were full of important activities.

Because of his depth of knowledge in the fields of philosophy, culture, and language, he was invited to present his views in many conferences. He addressed the All Asiatic Education Conference held in Banaras, December 1930 and presented a paper titled "The Ideal and Outlook in Education (IN INDIA AND THE EAST)". He also presided over and/or submitted papers in several sessions of the Indian History Congress on the "Cult of Jagannath" and the Odia language between 1949 and 1959. The presentations in these sessions and some of his other lectures have been compiled into a book titled "Discovery of Orissa in the speeches and writings of Pandit Nilakantha Das".

Nilakantha was the first Odia linguist and the first Odia Juvenile litterateur. He was also the first Oriya Script reformer, and the first pure Odia grammarian. In addition, Nilakantha was a Fellow of Delhi University Court for seven years.

=== Social reformer ===
Nilakantha tried to remove the ills of the society through his work and philosophy. Although born into a Shashan Brahmin caste of Puri, he was against all archaic cultures in Hinduism. He made scathing attack on occult power, horoscope and palmistry through his writings. He was the founder-secretary of the Orissa branch of Hindu Mahasabha in 1925, with Janakinath Bose, father of Netaji Subhas Bose, as the President. He used this platform in denouncing practices like untouchability, dowry, child marriage, prohibition of widow marriage, etc. For his own marriage at the age of 20, he rejected a cash dowry of Rs. 4,000 and married in a lower-middle-class family.

He was against many social and cultural restrictions imposed by upper class Brahmins and wrote a series of articles, under the title Mo Nisha (My Mustache) in the well-known monthly magazine of the time called "Mukura" to protest against it.

Pandit Nilakantha edited the celebrated monthly magazine NabaBharat from 1934 to 1953 with occasional breaks, and published a daily paper of the same from 1941 to 1953. The intelligentsia of Odisha and experts from various fields published their critical articles in many different fields, including social reforms, in this magazine.

Nilakantha objected against Bhaktika Mithya, (lies or exaggeration due to admiration, devotion or misinformation) whereupon admirers embellish the accomplishments or nature of a celebrated personality or a nation through either exaggeration or false narratives. Often, it starts as a fabrication of a poet and later others start believing it as true. He tried to point out such incidents involving himself and other well-known people, without bothering for criticisms by others for doing so.

=== Philosopher ===
Pandit Nilakantha was a philosopher of the highest rank and was a great believer in the uniqueness and teachings of Jagannath Dharma. The term Dharma here does not refer to religion, but to one's duty, philosophy and responsibilities as discussed in the Bhagabad Gita. To him, Jagannath, the tribal God of the Sabara people, was of special significance: it embodies the equality of all men; and he considered the traditions surrounding Jagannath to be Odisha's gift to the world. His book Arya Jeeban expresses his views and philosophies, the Manaba dharma, pertaining to a human being living harmoniously with the creation.

Nilakantha was influenced by the doctrines of Jain Dharma, and found great parallelism between Jainism and Jagannath culture, both focusing on the equality of all men rather than on a supreme God. He claimed himself to be a Yuktibadi (believer in reasoning), rather than a Bhaktibadi (believer in blind devotion). Although not an atheist, he was not a supporter of organized religion or cults.

=== Personality ===
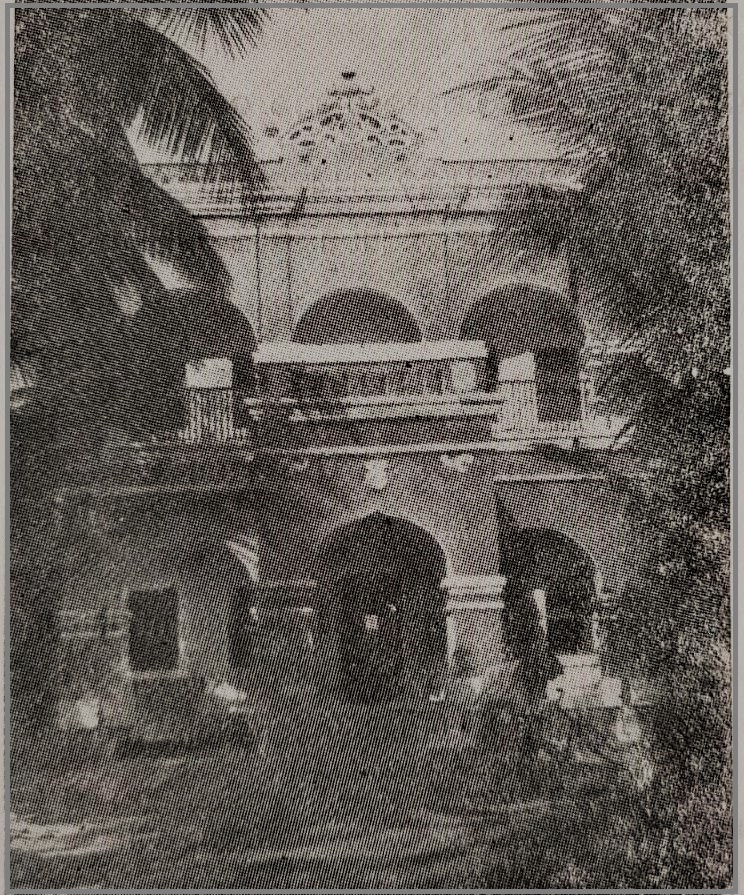
Nilakantha's home in his village Sri RamachandraPur

Pandit Nilakantha was proud of Odisha and its cultural heritage. He was also a man of the soil and loved his village, Sri Ramachandrapur. On his infrequent trips to the village during his active life, he met the elders and young men there in his front porch almost daily - to get the village news and learn of the villagers' plights.

When Nilakantha wanted to join the Indian Independence movement, on the advice of Gopabandhu Das, he requested his father-in-law to take care of his young family and elderly parents. Two of his daughters died in their childhood at the age of four or five, when Nilakantha was away on his mission for the country, first in 1921 at Sambalpur, and the other time in 1923 while being transferred from Puri Jail to Hazaribagh. But it did not deter him from his goal.

For most part of his active life, Nilakantha did not possess a car, and on returning from Delhi, Cuttack or other places, used to travel the two miles from the Sakhigopal Railway station to his village home in bullock carts. He never built a house outside his village, not even in Puri to spend his old days there, and had simply renovated his village home for the convenience of his parents and family. After retirement from politics, he often stayed with his children in the cities for medical treatment and other activities.

== Resting place ==
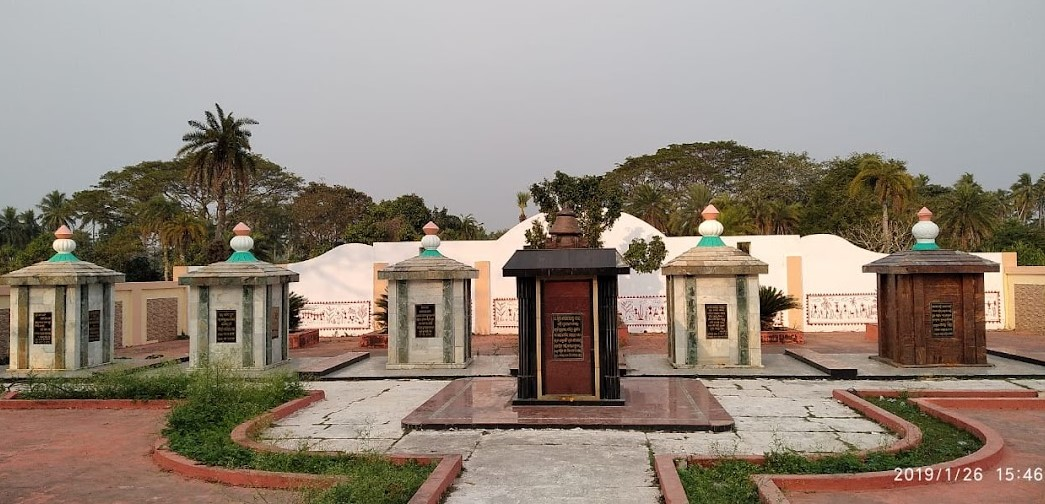
Pancha-Sakha cremation ground Memorial park in Sakhigopal (From: IN.Worldorg.com)

Nilakantha Das died on 6 November 1967 in Cuttack, at the residence of his eldest daughter and son-in-law. He was suffering from ill health during the last few years of his life and died peacefully surrounded by his extended family and friends. He was cremated in full state honour in Sakhigopal, in the cemetery of the Pancha Sakhas, his dear friends of the Satyabadi era. The day was declared a state holiday for people of Odisha to mourn him properly.

Nilakantha's memorial was later erected there, near that of Gopabandhu and Godabarish, for the nation to pay its obeisance to these immortal souls. His statues are also erected in various places such as Satyabadi, Vani Vihar, Bhubaneswar General Post Office, and Calcutta.

== Awards and accolades ==
Nilakantha was admired and respected for his knowledge, ethics, techniques, and perseverance by many prominent people both inside and outside Odisha. He was a great rajanitigyan, but never a politician. He was given the Padma Bhusan award for Public Affairs in 1957, which was delivered to him personally by the then President of India, Dr. Rajendra Prasad at his Government residence in Bhubaneswar since he was unable to travel to Delhi. For his 75th birthday, many eminent persons, including Pandit Jawaharlal Nehru, Gobinda Ballav Pant, Dr. Rajendra Prasad, Bhimsen Sachar sent him their admiring messages.

Pandit Nilakantha received his honorary D.Litt. (Doctor of Letters) degree from Utkal University in 1955. He was also appointed as the pro-chancellor of the university from 1955 to 1962. He was the first President of the Odisha Sahitya Akademi (1957).

Because of his unfathomable knowledge in a wide range of disparate fields, he was honoured as Utkala Guru by Subhas Chandra Bose and others.

=== Nilakantha Smruti Samiti ===
Nilakantha had a significant following in Odisha among political leaders, educators, writers, philosophers and students. In 1978, the Nilakantha Smruti Samiti was established to preserve his works and document his contributions. The organisations, initially headed by economist and former Utkal University vice-chancellor Sadashiva Misra, maintains a collection of Nilakantha's published writings and articles about his work. Some materials have since been republished or digitised for public access.

Some of the compiled books and articles published by Nilakantha Smruti Samiti are included under the Further Reading section below.

=== Further reading ===
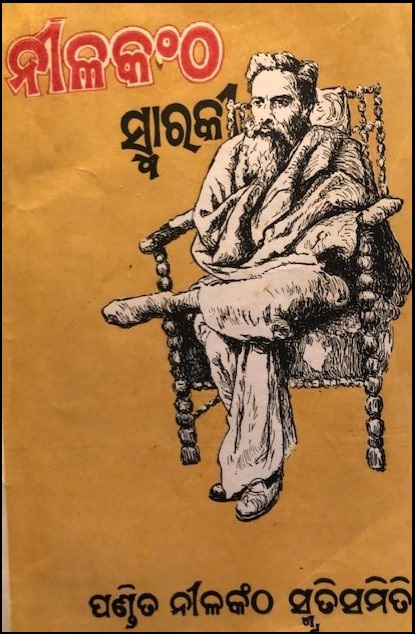
Cover page of Nilakantha Smaraki - First Volume (1980)

Important Odia and English publications on Pandit Nilakantha Das under Smruti Samiti:

1. Nilakantha Smaraki – On different aspects of Nilakantha's talents and contributions - by many renowned personalities of Odisha (Volumes 1–5, 1980–1988)
2. Pandit Nilakantha O Tanka Prativa: Dr. Satya Narayan Rajguru (Published by Utkal University - 1983)
3. Pandit Nilakantha Das – Life and Achievements: Lila Ray (1985)
4. Bakula Banara Guru: Jatiya Kabi Bira Kishore Das (Second edition, 1987)
5. Darsanika Nilakantha – Articles on Philosophical Views of Nilakantha (1988)
6. Utkala Guru Pandit Nilakanth – Life history and Achievements of Nilakantha: Dr. Kishore Chandra Padhy (1989)
7. Loka Samskrutibid Nilakantha – Contributions of Folklores to Odia language: Dr. Mahendra Kumar Misra (1990)
8. Atma Jibanee - Autobiography of Nilakantha Das discussing matters related to Odisha (1963)
