= Acharya Harihar =

Indian teacher and social worker

Acharya Harihara Das
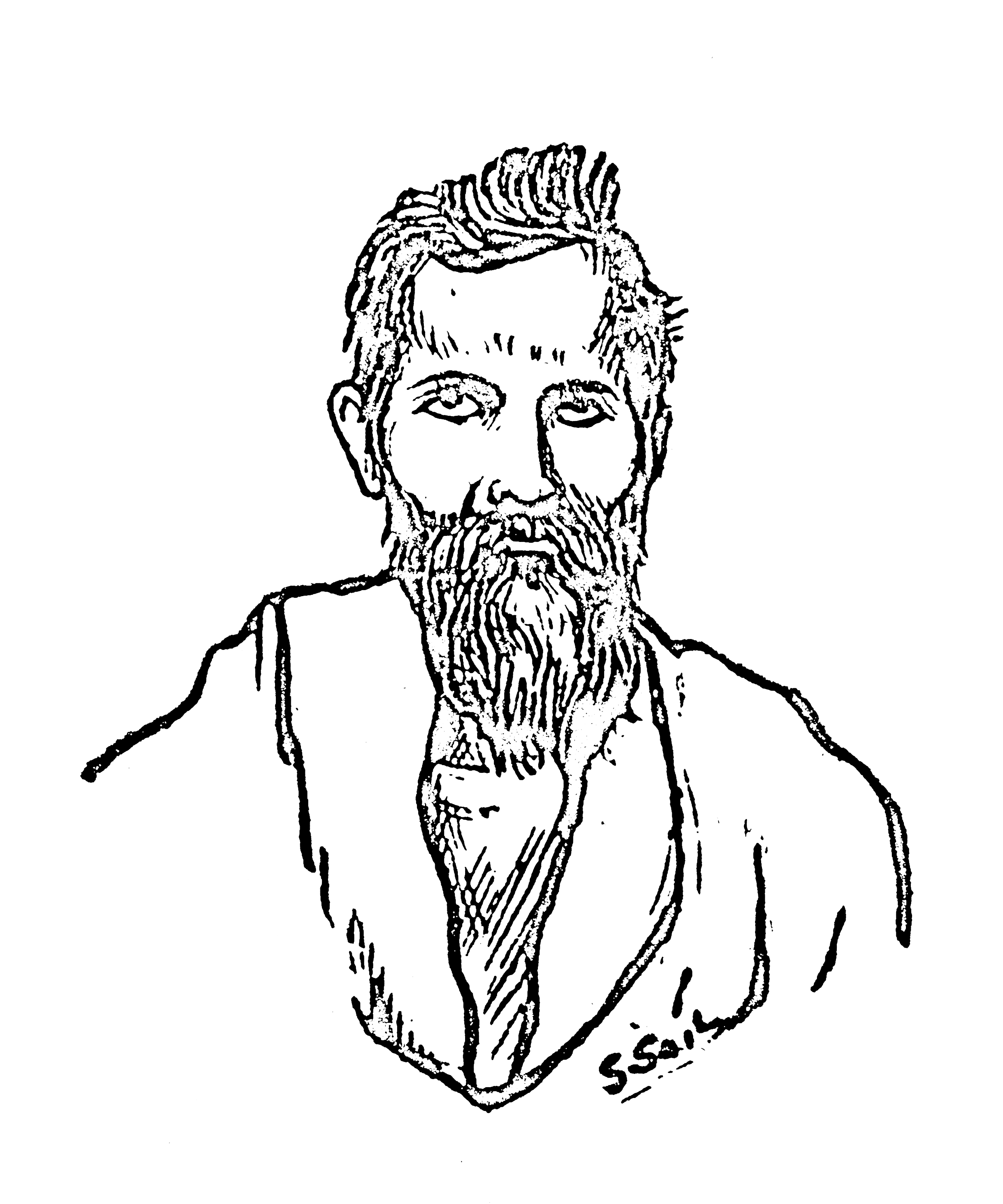
- Drawn By Sunamani Samal
- Born: 8 March 1879; Sriramchandrapur, Sakhigopal, Puri
- Died: 21 February 1971 (aged 91)
- Occupation: Teacher
- Notable work: Translation of Bhagavad Gita, Children's grammar book in the Odia language
- Parent(s): Shraddha Devi, Mahadev Brahma

Acharya Harihar (8 March 1879 – 21 February 1971) was a freedom fighter, teacher and social worker born to a Brahmin family in Sakhigopal in Puri District of Odisha. As a teacher of Satyabadi Bana Bidyalaya, he actively and successfully participated in the literary work of Satyabadi. He composed a translation of the Bhagavad Gita in Odia and children's grammar book in Odia language.

Acharya Harihar was born in AD 1879 at Sriramchandrapur village near Sakhigopal. His mother's name was Shraddha Devi and his father's name was Mahadev Brahma. He completed his primary education in the village, then moved to Puri District School to pursue high school studies. While studying at Puri, he started showing an interest in social service. After he graduated from Puri District School in 1901, he did the F.A. in Ravenshaw College and moved to Calcutta to pursue a degree in law which he was unable to complete.

He started his career as a temporary teacher at Puri District School and declined a permanent position there. Later he moved to Nilagiri and worked there as an assistant teacher. After the Nilagiri school was shut down by British influence, he joined Pyarimohan Academy at Cuttack. In 1912, he joined the national school at Satyabadi established by Gopabadhu Das.

He participated in the Salt Satyagraha along with Gopabandhu Choudhury in 1930 and was arrested and sent to Hazaribag Jail for six months.

He joined Bhoodan Movement led by Vinoba Bhave and accelerated the movement. Acharya Harihar Post Graduate Institute of Cancer was named after Acharya Harihara Das for his significant contributions to social work.
