= Sakhigopal =

Town of Puri district in Odisha, India

Sakhigopal Satyabadi
- Town
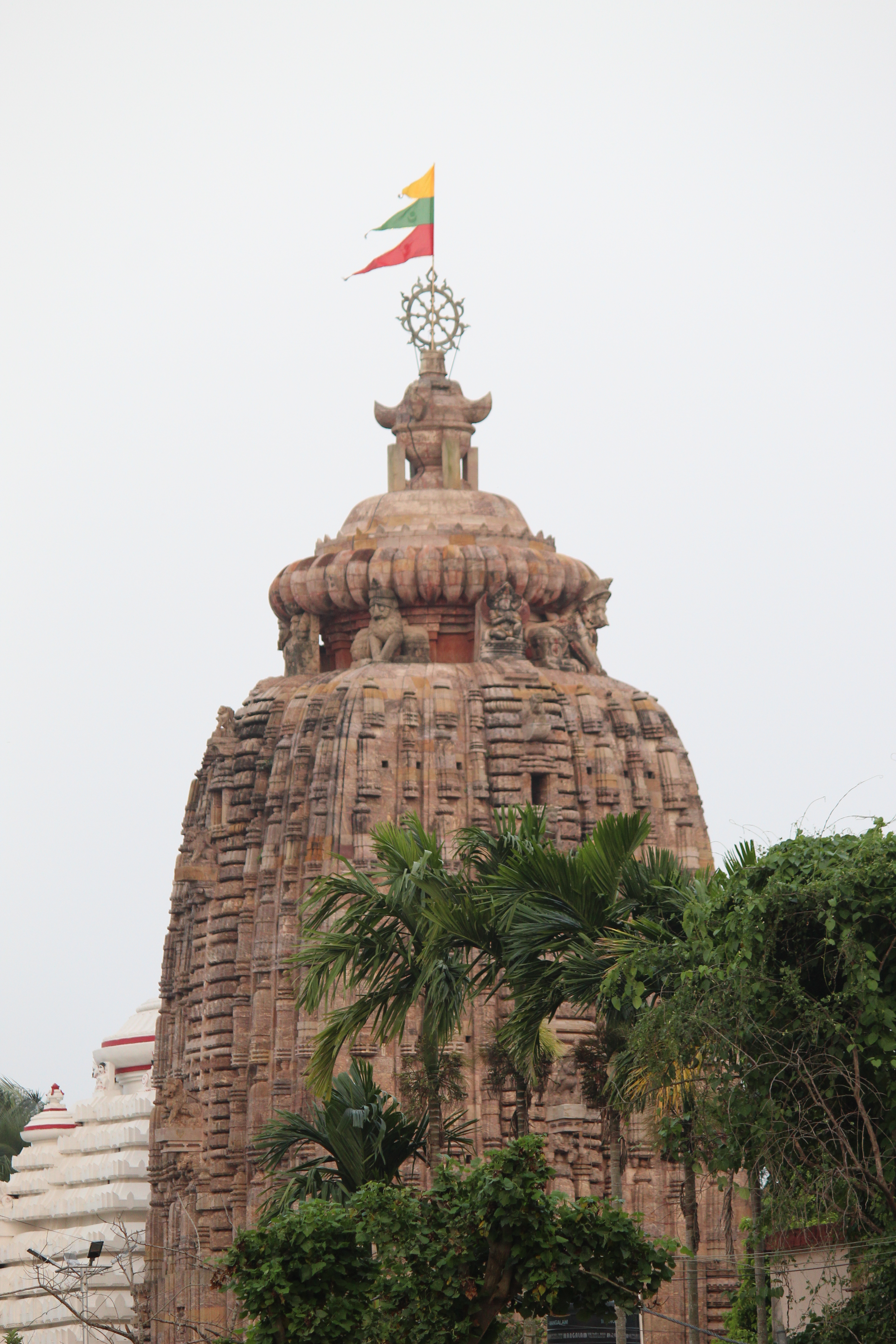
- Sakhigopal Mandir

- Location in Odisha, India Sakhigopal (India)
- Coordinates: 19.9464°N 85.8138°E
- Country: India
- State: Odisha
- District: Puri
- Named for: Krishna

Government
  - Type: Panchayat
  - Body: Sakhigopal G.P
  - Member of Legislative Assembly: Om Prakash Mishra (BJP)
  - Member of Parliament: Sambit Patra (BJP)

Languages
  - Official: Odia, English
- Time zone: UTC+5:30 (IST)
- PIN: 752014
- STD Telephone code: 06752
- Vehicle registration: OD-13 (Old OR-13)
- Block: Satyabadi
- Odisha Legislative Assembly Constituency: Satyabadi
- Lok Sabha Constituency: Puri

Sakhigopal or Satyabadi is a town in Puri district in the Indian state of Odisha.

== About ==
Sakhigopal is one of the Hindu pilgrimage centres in Odisha for the Sakhigopal Temple. The name Sakhigopal literally means Gopal (Srikrishna) being a witness.

Before the establishment of Sakhigopal Temple, the place was called Satyabadi and is still known by this alternative name.

Earlier, Sakhigopal village was under Satyabadi Block which was spread over an area of 282.34 km^{2}. It has 169 inhabited villages, 4 uninhabited villages.

On 13 March 2024, the Government of Odisha upgraded Sakhigopal village to be a NAC.

There is a Railway Station called Sakhigopal

It is adjacent to:

- Pipli and Bhubaneswar, By north
- Khordha and Jatni, by Northwest
- Chandanpur, Malatipatpur and Puri, by South

== Demographics ==
According to the 2011 Census, Satyabadi Community Block had a population of 1,96,136 with 99,599 (50.8%) male and 96,537 (49.2%) female population. There are a total of 43,350 households. The population density is 695 people per km^{2}.

Followers of Hinduism form the majority of the population, while Muslims and Christians are a small minority. The population of Hindus is 1,93,921 (98.9%), Muslims is 1,974 (1%) and Christians is 51 (0.02%).

== Educational institutions ==
- Odia University
- Satyabadi High School
- Govt. Elementary Teacher Education Institution, Sakhigopal
- Govt. Girl's High School, Sakhigopal
- Govt. Upgraded High School
- Odisha Adarsha Vidyalaya, Satyabadi
- Saraswati Sishu Vidya Mandir
- Satyabadi Sangeet Mahavidyalaya
- Satyabadi School of Integral Education
- St. Xavier's High School, Sakhigopal
- Utkalmani Gopabandhu Smruti (Degree) Mahavidyalaya

== Politics ==
Sakhigopal is a part of Satyabadi Assembly Constituency. Current MLA from Satyabadi Assembly Constituency is Om Prakash Mishra of BJP, who won the seat in State elections in 2024.

Satyabadi is a part of Puri Lok Sabha constituency.
