= Utkal Sahitya Samaj =

Literary organization in Cuttack, Odisha, India

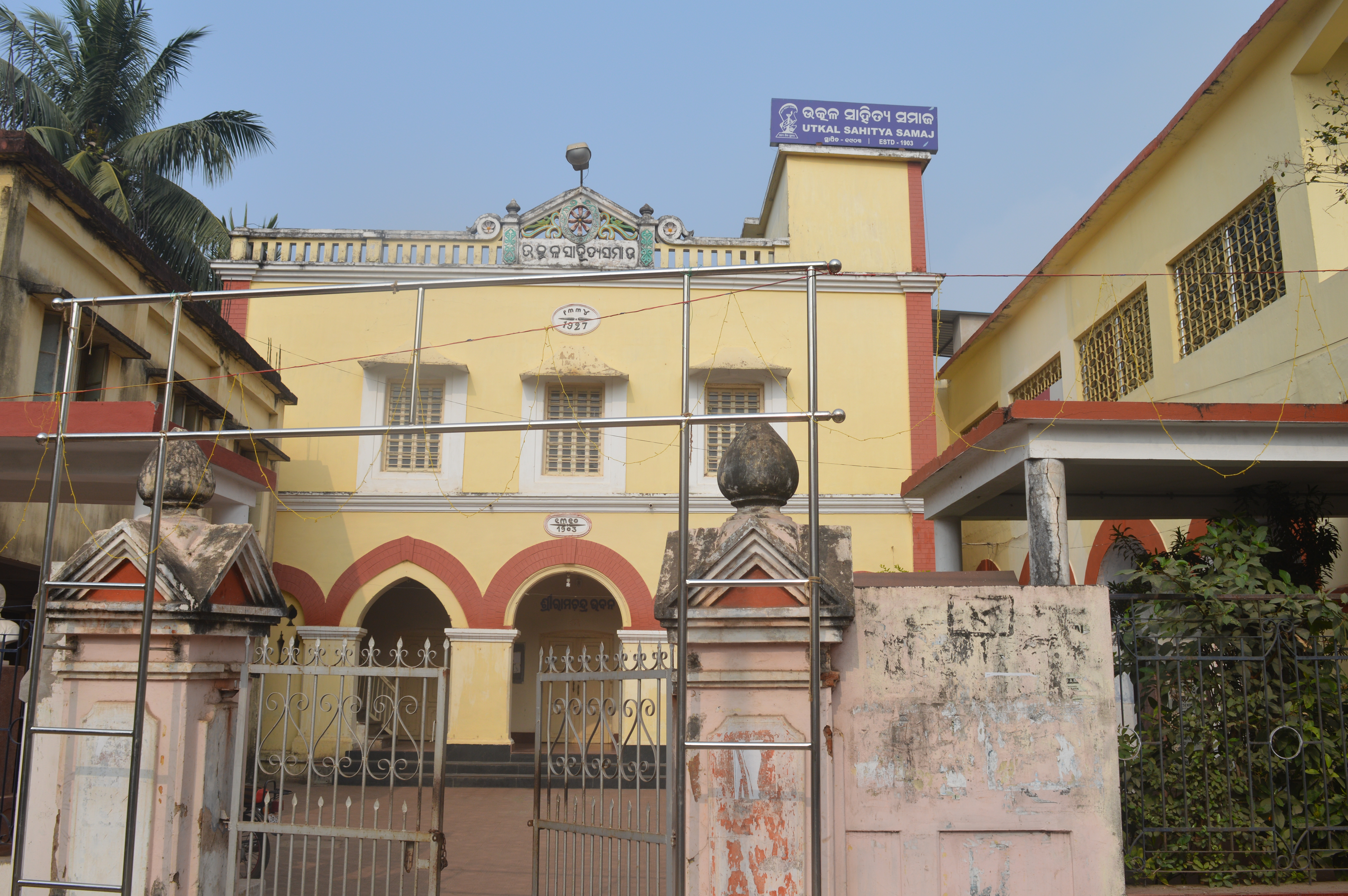
Utkal Sahitya Samaj, founded in 1903

Utkal Sahitya Samaj (Utkal Literary Society) is a literary organization located in Cuttack, Odisha, India, founded in 1903. The organization is aimed to the debate on Odia literature and to develop people's interest in Odia language.

Historian Prabhat Mukherjee remarks that the establishment of the Utkal Sahitya Samaj "marked the renaissance in Oriya literature".

== History ==
Utkal Sahitya Samaj is the oldest and premier literary and cultural organization in Odisha. To insist on creativity and to enlarge ideas, “Alochana Sabha” was founded in the Normal school of Cuttack in 1895. Though it was basically created for students, mostly literary persons and intellectuals were involved in it. On 7th May 1903, this organization was transformed into a big literary organization and “Utkal Sahitya Samaj” came into being. The main aim of the establishment of Utkal Sahitya Samaj was to arrange debate on Oriya literature and to develop people's interest in Oriya language.

The President of “Alochana Sabha” Madhusudan Rao became the first President of “Utkal Sahitya Samaj” and Bagmi Biswanath Kar became its first Secretary. Among others, Ram Shankar Ray and Fakir Mohan Senapati became its associate presidents; Mrutyunjay Rath, Gopal Chandra Praharaj and Chandrasekhar Nanda became its associate secretaries, and Krushna Prasad Choudhury accepted the responsibility of Treasurer. Abhiram Bhanj, Madhusudan Dash (Teacher), Nanda Kishor Bal, Brajananda Das, Purushottam Tarkalankar, Raghabananda Das, Braja Sundar Das and Damodar Kar became members of the Executive Body.

The Guardians and patrons of the organization were Sri Ramchandra Bhanjadev, king of Mayurbhanj, the king of Khallikot, Sri Harihara Mardaraj Dev the king of Badakhemundi, Sri Krupamay Anangakeshari Dev, King of Balasore Sri Baikunthanath De Bahadur, Radhanath Ray, Madhusudan Das and Gourisankar Ray.

Kabibar Radhanath Ray presided over the first meeting of Utkal Sahitya Samaj.

== Awards ==
Utkal Sahitya Samaj gives annual award named 'Utkal Ratna' to the author of significant work published in Odia language.

== Presidents ==
- Radhanath Ray
- Ratnakar Chaini
- Kunja Bihari Das
