= Godabarish Mohapatra =

Odia writer

- Born: Godabarish Mohapatra; 1 October 1898; Kumarang, Banapur, British India
- Died: 25 November 1965 (aged 67)
- Education: Ravenshaw College
- Occupation: Writer • Poet • Journalist
- Known for: • Niankhunta • Tuan Tuin • Kanta O Phula • Magunira Shagada
- Awards: Kendra Sahitya Academy Award (1966); Odisha Sahitya Academy Award (1959) & (1962)

Godabarish Mohapatra (ଓଡ଼ିଆ : ଗୋଦାବରୀଶ ମହାପାତ୍ର) (1 October 1898 – 25 November 1965) was a story writer and poet in Odia literature. He was also a journalist of Odisha, best known as the editor of "Niankhunta", a monthly criticism magazine, and "Tuan Tuin", a monthly children's magazine.

== Early life ==
He was born on 1 October 1898 at Kumarang near Banapur in Odisha. He completed his schooling in 1921 at the famous Satyabadi Bana Bidyalaya under Godabarish Mishra's supervision and later his higher education at Ravenshaw University, Cuttack. In 1930 Pandit Godabarish Mohapatra established a high school at Banapur. Mohapatra was the first secretary of the managing committee as well as a teacher at the beginning of the school.

== Works ==
Godabarish Mohapatra's main concern was with contemporary politics about which he wrote, mostly in poetry, in great detail and at times with pungent bitter satire. He founded and edited a journal called Niankhunta ("The Fire-fling") which ran for about 27 years (1938-1964) and quickly got itself established as the most important Odia journal of humour and politics. In 1957 he brought out a children's periodical, Tuan Tuin. Although most of the content was stories and poems, special emphasis was given to the promotion of social consciousness and scientific attitude. Some of his poetical volumes that may be mentioned in this context are "He mora Kalama" (1951), "Handishalare Biplaba" (1952), "Kanta O Phula" (1958), "Banka O Sidha", "Mo Khelasahi" (1958), "Kunira Hati" (1959), "Ki Katha" (1961) and "Desha Bidesha Upakatha" (1962), altogether containing hundreds of short poems. His two poetry anthologies - i.e., "Kanta O Phula" and "Utha Kankala" - were given the Odisha Sahitya Academy Award in 1959 and 1962 respectively. He died on 25 November 1965. A year after his death, his poetical work "Banka O Sidha" received the Central Sahitya Academy Award.

Two of his best-known stories, "Magunira Shagada" (1955) and "Nila Mastarani" (1958), were made into films.
