= Aswini Kumar Ghose =

Indian playwright (1892–1962)

Aswini Kumar Ghose (1892–1962) was an Indian dramatist from Odisha. He is known in Odia literature for his historical plays written in the Odia language based on various Indian historical personalities such as Kalapahad and Tipu Sultan.

== Biography ==
He was born in 1892 as the eldest son of Akshyaya Kumar Ghose and Sundaramanu Devi. He spent the most part of his childhood in Chodhury Bazar, Cuttack. He completed his early education in Cuttack. He passed the F.A. (intermediate) examination from Ravenshaw College, Cuttack. After that, he moved to Culcutta and joined Vidyasagar College. Because of health problems, he returned to Cuttack and received his B.A. degree from Ravenshaw College in 1914. Due to his father's demise in the same year, he couldn't resume his study immediately. Later he received M.A. degree in Mathematics as a private candidate from Patna University.

He died in 1962.

== Career ==
He started his teaching career in 1916 as an Assistant Teacher at the Seminary School, Cuttack.

== Works ==
Ghose was a prolific playwright in Oriya language. Ghose wrote around twenty-five plays based on various social problems. While studying, he wrote his first drama Bhisma in 1915. It was performed by Ravenshaw College Dramatic Society.

== Recognition ==
He was considered as the "Bhisma Pitamah' (Grand Old Man ) of performing art.

== Personal life ==
Ghose's maternal grandfather Ghourishankar was the editor of Utkala Deepika, the first Odia language newspaper in Odisha.

In 1916, he married Kiranbala Ray, daughter of Brajamohan Ray. They had four sons and three daughters, among them two sons died in childhood.

Odia playwright Kartik Kumar Ghose was his younger brother.
