= Gopabandhu Das =

Indian writer (1877–1928)

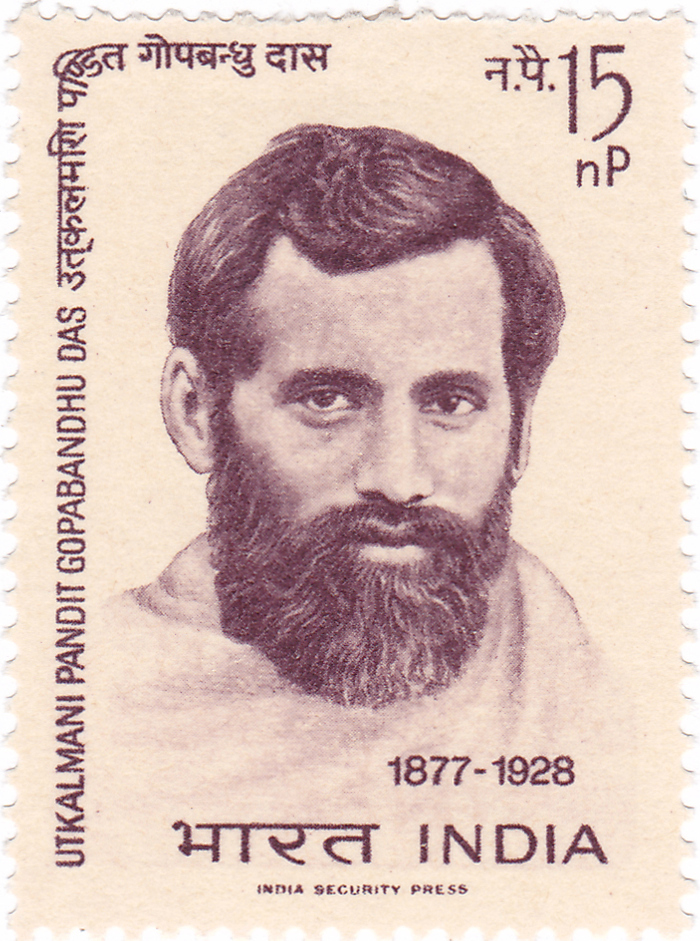
- Born: 9 October 1877; Suando, Puri district, Orissa, British India
- Died: 17 June 1928 (aged 50),
- Education: Puri Zilla School, Ravenshaw College, Calcutta University
- Occupations: Poet, philosopher, social activist
- Writing career
- Period: 20th century
- Notable works: Bandira Atma Katha, Dharmapada

Gopabandhu Das (1877–1928), popularly known as Pandit Utkalamani Gopabandhu Das (Jewel of Utkal or Odisha), was a social worker, reformer, political activist, journalist, poet and essayist.

== Early life ==
Gopabandhu Das was born on 9 October 1877 in Suando village, near Puri, Odisha in a Brahmin family. His mother was Swarnamayee Devi, the third wife of Daitari Dash. His father was a Mukhtiar and the family were reasonably well-off. Das married Apti at the age of twelve but continued his education. He had basic schooling in the village before progressing to a middle school nearby. Then, in 1893, by which time his mother had died, Das joined Puri Zilla School. There he was influenced by Mukhtiar Ramchandra Das, a teacher who was both a nationalist and a proponent of public service in aid of people in distress. Becoming organising his fellow children in the spirit of co-operation, the inadequate response of authorities for the victims of an outbreak of cholera prompted him to start a voluntary corps called Puri Sava Samiti. Its members helped those suffering from the outbreak and also cremated the dead.

Das, whose father by now had died, progressed to Ravenshaw College in Cuttack. He became a regular contributor to local literary magazines called Indradhanu and Bijuli, where he argued that any modern literary movement, just like any modern nation, could not be a clean break with the old but rather had to acknowledge and base itself on its past. In one instance, he submitted a satirical poem that so enraged the Inspector of Schools that Das was punished when he refused to apologise for it.

It was while at Ravenshaw that Das, along with his friends, Braja Sundar Das and Lokanath Patnaik, started a discussion group, called "Kartavya Bodhini Samiti" (Duty Awakening Society), in which they considered social, economic and political problems. It was also during this time, in 1903, that he attended a meeting of the Utkal Sammilani (Utkal Union Conference), where he disagreed with Madhusudan Das's suggestion that Odia-speaking areas should be amalgamated with Bengal Presidency. These extra-curricular activities, which also included helping the victims of flooding, impacted on his academic studies such that he failed his degree examination, although he gained his BA at the second attempt. It was also while at Ravenshaw that his new-born son died; he explained his preference to deal with flood victims on that occasion rather than be with his sick son as being because "There are so many to look after my son. What more can I do? But there are so many people crying for help in the affected areas and it is my duty to go there. Lord Jagannath is here to take care of the boy". (Note: Notable occasions when Das was involved in relief efforts included during the floods that occurred in Orissa in 1907, 1927 and 1927, and during the 1920 famine.)

Das progressed to Calcutta University, where he obtained an MA and LL.B while simultaneously devoting much of his energies in attempts to improve the education of Oriya people who were living in the city, for whom he opened night schools. His desire to bring about social reform and educational improvements was influenced at this time by the philosophy of the Swadeshi movement. His wife died on the day he heard that he had passed his law examinations. Now aged 28, all of his three sons had died and he chose to give up care of his two daughters to an older brother, along with his share of property in Suando.

== Legal career ==
Das arrived at his first job as a teacher in Nilagiri in Balasore district of Odisha. He then became a lawyer, variously described as being based in Puri and in Cuttack. In 1909, Madhusudan Das appointed him to be State Pleader for the princely state of Mayurbhanj.

== Education work ==
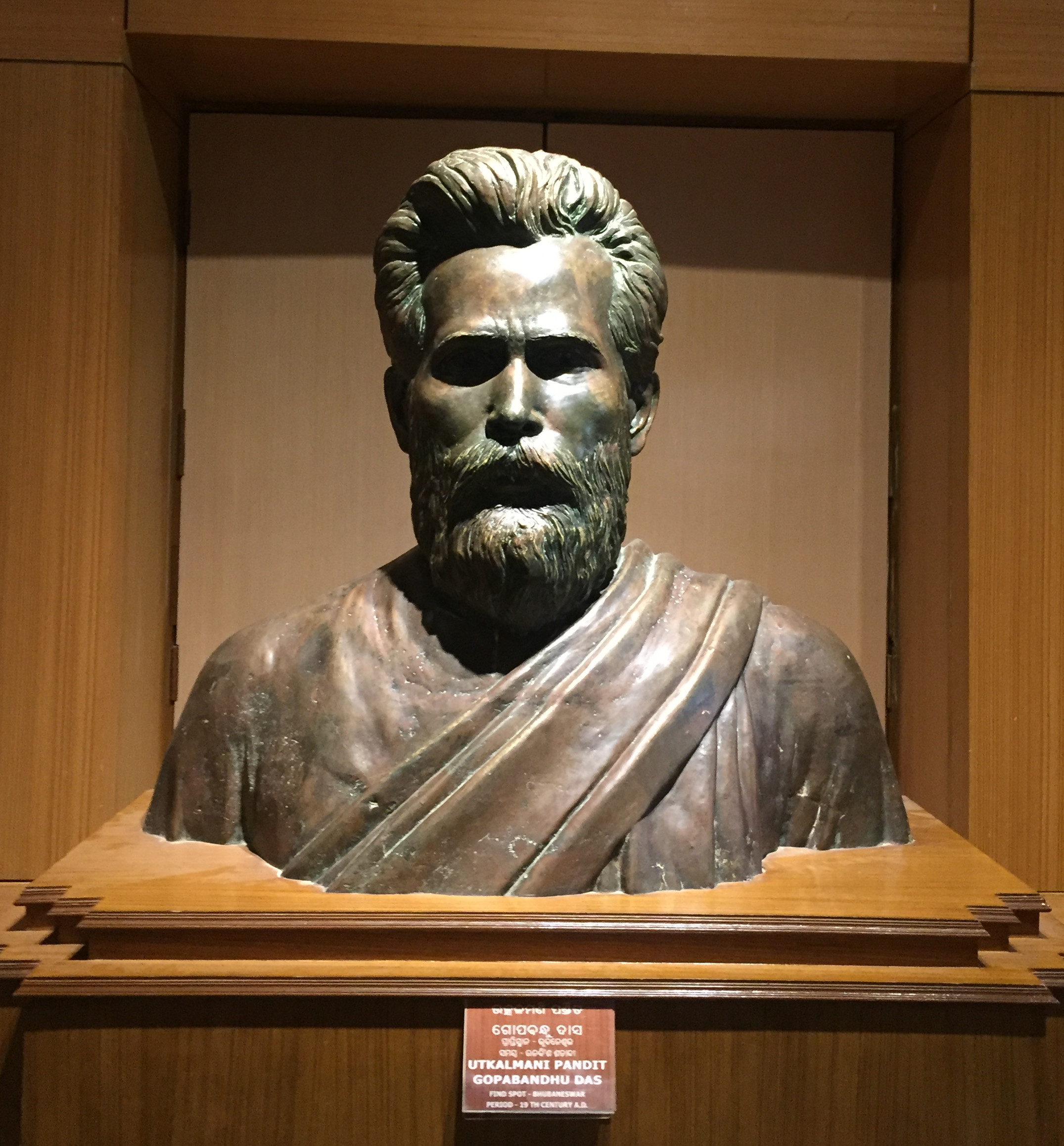
Sculpture of Gopabandhu Das at State Museum, Bhubaneswar

Finding that law did not interest him, Das gave up his practice and worked for the welfare of the people.

In 1909, Das established a school at Sakhigopal, near Puri. Popularly known as Satyabadi Bana Bidyalaya (Now Satyabadi High School, Sakhigopal) but called the Universal Education League by Das, it was inspired by the Deccan Education Society, operated in the gurukula tradition and aimed to impart a liberal education on a non-sectarian basis, despite opposition from orthodox Brahmins. He believed education was necessary if people were to become aware of their both of their innate freedom and their duty to their country. He thought that education could help the child to grow mentally, physically and spiritually. His system allowed children of all castes and backgrounds to sit together, dine together and study together. The school had features like residential schooling, teaching in a natural setting and cordial relationship between the teacher and the taught. Das laid emphasis on co-curricular activities and wanted to generate nationalistic feelings in students through education and teach them the value of service to mankind.

Hugely motivated by the positive response he received, the school was converted into a high school in the following year. It secured affiliation from Calcutta University and held its first matriculation exam in 1914. The school further secured an affiliation from Patna University in 1917. It became a National School in 1921. The school faced financial problems and ultimately was closed in 1926. Das had not taught much at the school due to pressures on his time elsewhere but he did act unofficially as its manager. He also attempted to raise funds for it, guide its curriculum and attract pupils.

== Political career and imprisonment ==
Madhusudan Das encouraged Gopabandhu Das to stand for election to the Legislative Council that had been created in 1909 under the terms of the Morley-Minto Reforms. He eventually overcame his reluctance, stood and was elected in 1917. There he concentrating his efforts on four themes:

- Administrative amalgamation into a single entity of the Oriya-speaking regions of Bengal Province, Central Province, Madras Presidency and Bihar and Orissa Province
- Eradication of famine and flood in Orissa
- Restoration of the region's right to manufacture salt without incurring excise duty
- Expansion of education on a model similar to that he had established at the Satyabadi school

Das ceased to be a member of the Legislative Council in 1919 or 1920.

Prior to his Legislative Council role, Das had been involved in regional politics. He had been a member of Utkal Sammilani from 1903 and was its president in 1919. After its members decided to join the Non-Cooperation movement, made at a conference on 31 December 1920, Das effectively became a member of the Indian National Congress. This was something he had worked towards, having attended meetings of the All India Congress Committee at Calcutta and Nagpur to persuade Mahatma Gandhi to adopt the Utkal Sammilani's primary goal of organising states based on the language spoken. He became the first president of Utkal Pradesh Congress Committee in 1920, holding the post until 1928, and he welcomed Gandhi to the province in 1921.

Das was arrested in 1921 for reporting the alleged molestation of a woman by police but was acquitted due to lack of evidence. He was arrested again in 1922, when he received a two-year prison sentence. He was released from Hazaribagh jail on 26 June 1924.

== Contribution to journalism ==
In 1913 or 1915, Das launched and acted as editor for a short-lived monthly literary magazine titled Satyabadi from the campus of his school. Through this he was able to indulge his childhood aspirations to be a poet, while contributions also came from other members of the school's staff, including Nilakantha Das and Godabarish Mishra.

Das saw journalism as a means to educate the masses even though they were illiterate. He initially accepted a role editing Asha, a newspaper published in Berhampur, but found it to be too constraining. Thus, in 1919, he started a weekly newspaper called The Samaja, based at the school campus. This was more successful than the literary journal and became a daily publication in 1927 and eventually a significant media presence for Indian nationalists. The writing style was intentionally simplistic.

Das had been persuaded to join the Lok Sevak Mandal (Servants of the People Society) some time after meeting Lala Lajpat Rai at a session of Congress in 1920 and the newspaper became a means of promoting it, although operated independently. He served as editor until his death, at which time he bequeathed it to the Society.

== Published literary works ==
- Karakabita
- Bandira Atmakatha Translated as The prisoner's autobiography
- Das, Gopabandhu (1946). "Dhramapada" (in Odia). OCLC 1126286052.
- Das, Gopabandhu (1986). Abakasa-cinta (in Odia). Satyabadi Presa. OCLC 499633975.
- Das, Gopabandhu (2013). Correspondence of Pandit Gopabandhu = Dāse āpaṇeṅka ciṭhipatra (in Latin). Pune Bhubaneswar: Nilakantha Rath, Distributor, Shikshasandhan. ISBN 978-81-87982-77-7. OCLC 904902700.
- Das, G. (1976). Gopabandhu racanābaḷī: Śikshā, śikshaka, o chātra. Gopabandhu racanābaḷī (in Quechua). Gopabandhu Janma Śatabārshikī Samiti.

== Death ==
Gopabandhu became All India Vice-president of the Lok Sevak Mandal in April 1928. He became ill while attending a society meeting in Lahore and died on 17 June 1928.

Brahmananda Satapathy, a professor of political science, has said of Das that "His crusade against untouchability, advocacy of widow remarriage, campaign for literacy, new model of education, stress on both rights and duties, emphasis on women education, particularly vocational training and above all a deep commitment and compassion for poor and destitutes have immortalised him in Orissa and India".
