= Utkal Sammilani =

Indian social and cultural organization

Utkala Sammilani (Odia: ଉତ୍କଳ ସମ୍ମିଳନୀ) The Utkala Sabha Sammilani was a welfare organization formed on August 16, 1882, in Cuttack, Odisha primarily meant for the unification of Odia (Oriya)-speaking tracts and promotion of elected local self- Government. It is an Indian social and cultural organization. It was founded in Cuttack, Odisha by Madhusudan Das and continues in present times.

== History ==
Utkal Sammilani was founded by Madhusudan Das. Its first meeting was held in Rambha in 1903 and included 62 "permanent members". The organization's first objective was to campaign for the unification of the state of Odisha, known as the Oriya Movement.

A conference was held in 1920 in Chakradharpur and the organization decided to join the non-cooperation movement that had recently been endorsed by the Indian National Congress. It elected a new president, Basanta Kumar Panigrahi, in 2002.

Utkal Sammilani was a key player in the transformation of the state of Orissa to its modern-day status as Odisha and it opposed Andhra Pradesh's Polavaram project in 2010.
