= Satyabadi Bana Bidyalaya =

School in Odisha, India

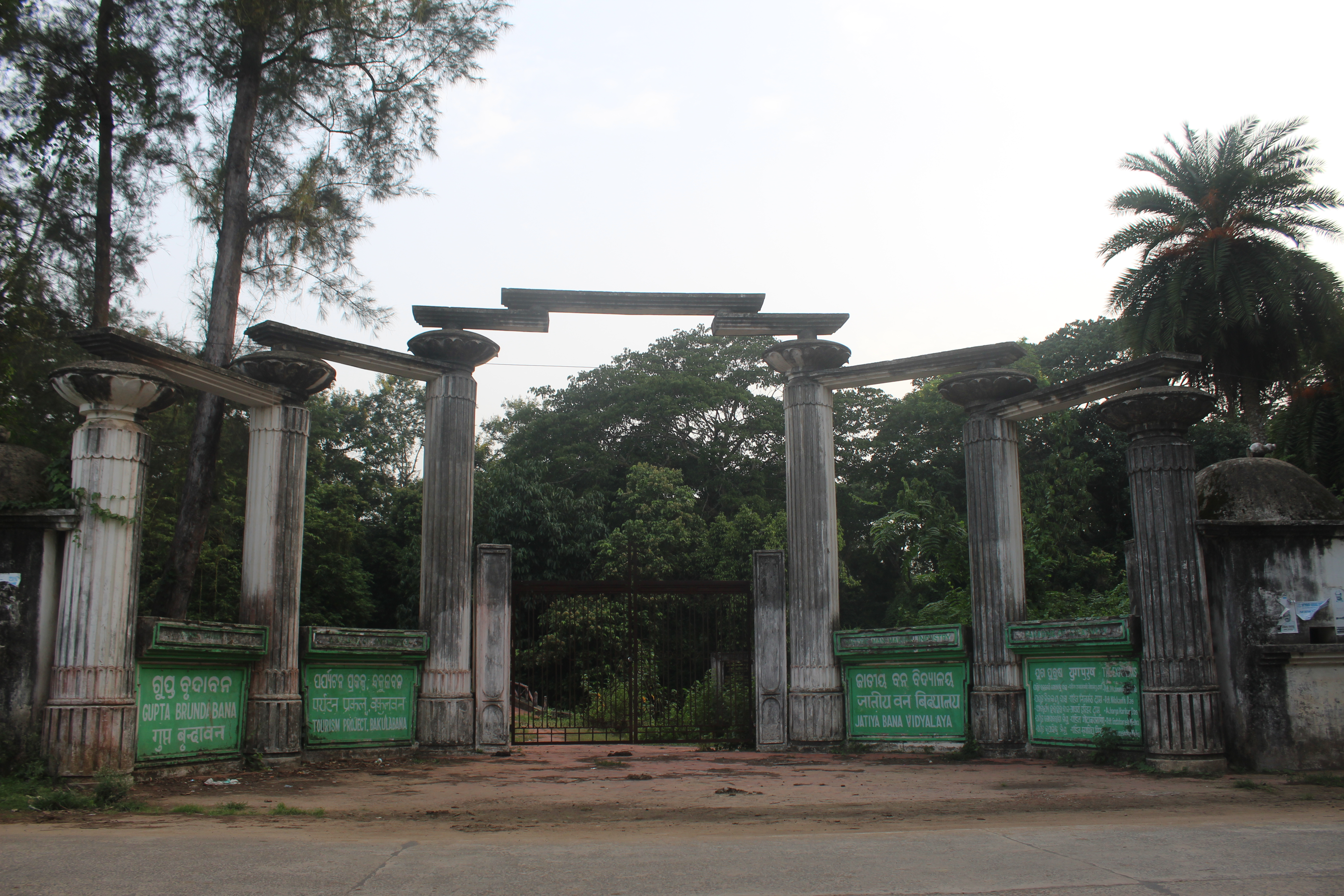
Gupta Brundabana (5)

Satyabadi Bana Bidyalaya (now Satyabadi High School, Sakhigoal) was an Indian school in Sakhigopal, Odisha. It is a pre-secondary and Secondary school, located at Sakhigopal a part of Puri district, in the Indian state of Odisha. It was established by writer and social worker Utkalamani Gopabandhu Das in British India in 1909. It was disestablished in 1926.

== See also ==
- Education in Odisha
- List of schools in Odisha
