= Saleem Farook =

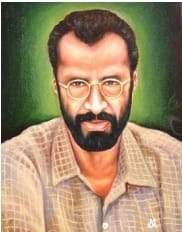
- Portrait of Saleem Farook
- Born: Saleem Basheer Farook; 20 February 1964; Somwarpet, Coorg, Karnataka
- Died: 4 July 2000 (aged 36); Kalahandi, Odisha
- Resting place: Qadam e Rasool, Cuttack
- Education: Maharaja's College, Mysore
- Occupation: social activist
- Years active: 1987-2000
- Organisation: Antodaya
- Movement: Thuamul Rampur tribal movement
- Spouse: Farhat Amin
- Children: 1 (Riyyan Amin Farooq)
- Father: Patel Basheer Farook
- Relatives: Hussain Rabi Gandhi (brother in law); Afzal-ul Amin (father in law); Sayeed Mohammed (grandfather in law)
- Website: http://www.antodaya.org.in

Saleem Farook was an Indian economist, tribal rights activist and social worker from Karnataka. In 1989 he started the Thuamul Rampur tribal movement in Kalahandi, Odisha which fought against the issue of land alienation of the tribals in that region. On 9 June 1989 he established the Antodaya society and organisation for the protection of tribal rights and promotion of tribal welfare in the tribal populated regions of southern Odisha. The Saleem Farook Janasikhya Pathagar at Mohangiri, Kalahandi is named after him.

== Early life and education ==
Saleem Farook was born Patel Saleem Basheer Farookh Ahmed in 1962 into the Patagaar-Patel family of Coorg to Patel Rahmaan Basheer Ahmed and his wife Begum Rahmath Basheer. He did his schooling from O.L.V convent school in Somwarpet. He later graduated in economics from Maharaja's College, Mysore. He did a diploma in rural development and management from Mysore University.

== Career ==
Farook was initially appointed as a campaign manager for a state based NGO in Maharashtra. Later he shifted his base to Kalahandi, Odisha where he started working for the tribals. He and his team started a movement fighting against this issue of land alienation of tribals of this block. During this period the local government made an attempt to interact with the people of Thuamul Rampur block and Sri R.B. Pattanaik who was the then collector of Kalahandi advised the group led by Farook (which was later to become Antodaya) to explore the possibilities of initiating community development work in either Lanjigarh or Thuamul Rampur block. Farook opted to explore possibilities in Thuamul Rampur block as there were no NGOs there at that time. The initial strategy was to gain experience by living with the tribal community and to address the issues and the possible solutions which could improve the living conditions of the tribal population. In a survey in 1985 it was found that a large number of tribals were either selling or mortgaging their lands in spite of the benefits that were provided to them under the "Land Reforms Act" (Art-22, 23,23A of regulation 2).

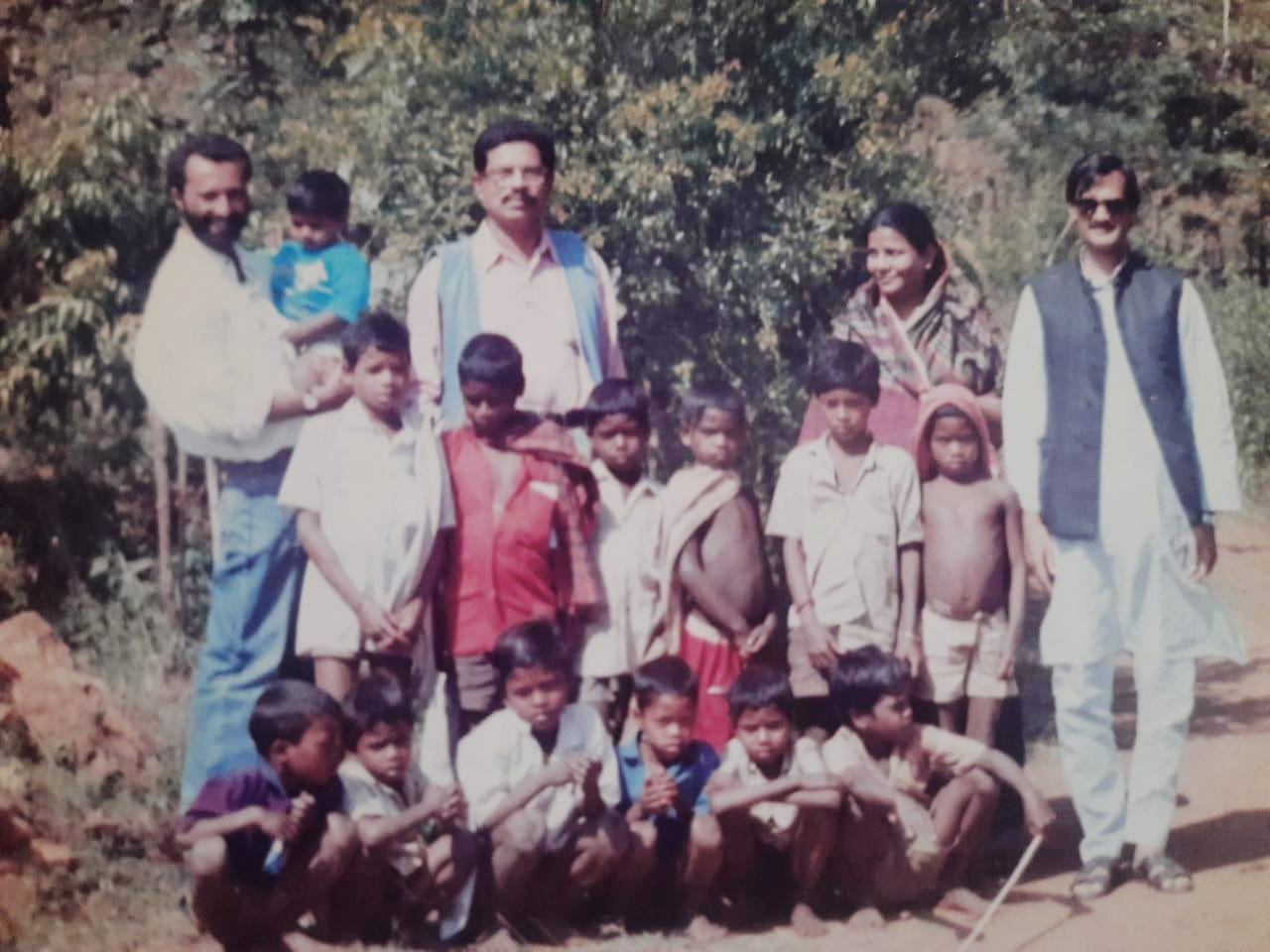
Farook at Antodaya, Kalahandi, Odisha in 1997.

It took almost two years to take up the issue of land alienation to the higher authorities, the district administration then came forward to help the tribals get back their lands. A public interest litigation was filed in the Odisha high court by Farook which led to a Commission of Inquiry by Justice Baidyanath Mishra. The High Court advised the administration to allow tribals to plead without the services of advocates. More than 175 acres of alienated lands were restored to the tribals.

Farook founded an organisation called Antodaya which he registered as a society in 1989. He took active steps to stop child selling, starvation, land alienation and killings due to superstitions in the area. He wrote a paper titled 'Ascertaining Basic Rights over Collecting, Processing and Marketing of minor forest products produced by Tribal Women', which examines the tribal economy and the role of the organization in linking the poor tribals to the market. He served as the founder and chairman of the organisation until his death in 2000.

The Saleem Farook Janasikhya Pathagar at Mohangiri, Kalahandi is named after him.
