= Khwaja Fazal Mohammed =

Sufi Pīr

Khwaja Pir Fazal Mohammed
- Born: 1805; Dhenkanal State, Company Raj (present day : Dhenkanal, Odisha)
- Died: 10 February 1868 (aged 62–63); Angul, Odisha
- Resting place: Bada Majara, Angul
- Spouse: Dilshaad Ara Begum
- Children: Atharuddin Mohammed, Haqiqat Zamani Begum, Shaukat Zamani Begum, Qudrat Zamani Begum
- Parents: Khwaja Afzal Mohammed [Sufi name : Qavi Shah] (father); Begum Aziza Mahal (mother)
- Relatives: Sayeed Mohammed (grandson); Afzal-ul Amin (great grandson)

Khwaja Fazal Mohammed (1805 – 1868) [Sufi name : Gawahi Shah] was a Sufi Pīr and philosopher of the Ni'matullāhī order. He served as the Samanta of Madhi (presently known as Kamkhyangar) from 1834 to 1868. Khwaja Fazal Mohammed played an instrumental role in bringing the teachings of Ni'matullāhī order to Odisha. His tomb at Solada, Dhenkanal (present day : Angul) is the only tomb of a Ni'mātullāhī wali in Odisha and is revered by both Hindus and Muslims.

== Ancestry ==
Khwaja Fazal Mohammed was one of the direct descendants of Shah Khalilullah, the qutub of Ni'matullāhī order. Fazal's ancestry can be traced back to Shah Nimatullah Wali, the 14th century Persian Sufi master of Iran and Musa al Kadhim, the 7th Imam and a renowned scholar who was a contemporary of the Abbasid Caliph Al-Mansur.

While Fazal's mother, Begum Aziza Mahal was a daughter of Khwaja Yusuf Khan of the Najm-i-Sani dynasty

== Life ==
In the initial years, Fazal Mohammed popularized the teachings of the qutub of the Ni'matullāhī order in Odisha. He later left spiritualism and joined the service of the Raja of Dhenkanal State. Fazal was appointed as the Samanta of Madhi gada by Raja Bhagiratha Mahendra. He assisted the Raja in his tiger hunting campaigns, the Raja in his life had killed not fewer than 352 tigers.

Fazal Mohammed married Dilshaad ara Begum, the daughter of Sheikh Nasrullah Mohammed who was from the same spiritual order as Fazal, they had a son named Atharuddin Mohammed who grew up to be the Diwan of Dhenkanal.

== Tomb ==
In 1868, Fazal Mohammed while on his way back from the Durbar, suffered from a heart attack and fell from his horse, he died there. As per the Sunni Ni'matullāhī traditions, he was buried in the same spot and a tomb was built upon his grave which was commissioned by the Raja himself.

Today, his tomb at Solada, Angul is revered by both the Hindus and the Muslims and is taken care by the local tribals and hindu villagers. The Choti Masjid built by his son, Atharuddin Mohammed at Cuttack near Qadam e Rasool is dedicated to Fazal Mohammed and is named after him.
