= Afzal-ul Amin =

Indian politician and social worker (1915-1983)

Mohammed Afzal-ul Amin
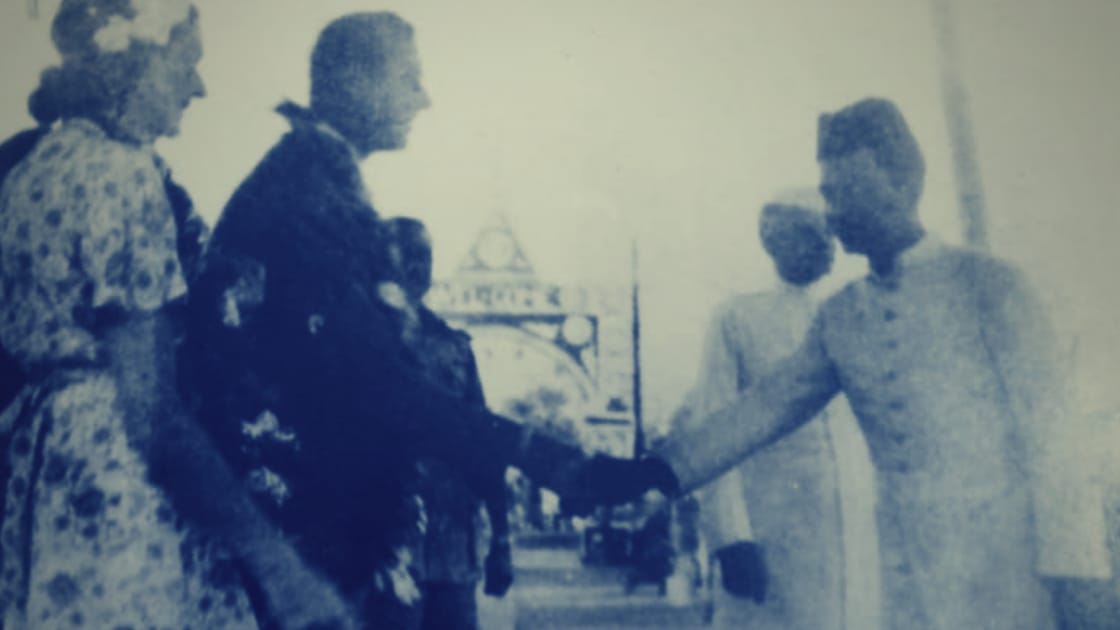
- Afzal-ul Amin shaking hands with Lord Mountbatten

President, Odisha Board of Wakfs
- In office June 1963 – November 1977

Vice chairman, Cuttack Municipal Corporation
- In office 25 February 1955 – 27 November 1960

Chairman, Cuttack Municipality
- In office 21 March 1960 – 21 June 1965

Personal details
- Born: 16 July 1915 Cuttack, Bihar and Orissa, British India
- Died: 28 May 1983 (aged 67) Cuttack, Odisha, India
- Resting place: Qadam e Rasool, Cuttack
- Citizenship: British India (1915–1947); India (1947–1983)
- Party: Indian National Congress
- Other political affiliations: Odisha Pradesh Congress Committee
- Spouse: Syeda Roshanara Akhtar
- Children: Tabasum Sultana, Farhat Amin
- Parents: Sayeed Mohammed (father); Begum Badar un nissa Akhtar (mother)
- Relatives: Hussain Rabi Gandhi (elder son-in-law); Saleem Farook (younger son-in-law); Ibrahim Suhrawardy (father-in-law)
- Education: Ravenshaw Collegiate School
- Occupation: Politician, Social activist

Mohammed Afzal-ul Amin, popularly known as M.A. Amin, was an Indian statesman, politician and social worker from Cuttack, Odisha. He served as the general secretary of Utkal Pradesh Congress Committee during Biren Mitra's chief ministership. Afzal-ul was the Vice Chairman and later the Chairman of Cuttack Municipality and also the President of Odisha Mohammadan Association. He played a major role in preserving Urdu language in Cuttack by establishing several lower primary and upper primary Urdu schools in the city and in amplifying the Bhoodan movement in Odisha. He is also credited for organising various nationalist meetings and for mobilizing the common masses in Cuttack during the Quit India movement of 1942.

== Life and career ==
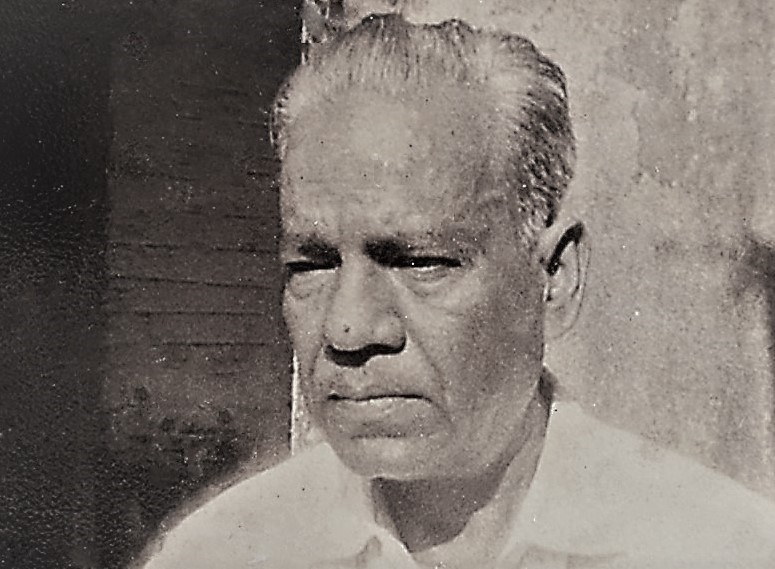
Portrait of M.A. Amin

Mohammed Afzal-ul Amin alias M.A. Amin was born into a Dewan family, to the notable educationist of Cuttack, Sayeed Mohammed and his wife Begum Badar un nissa Akhtar. Amin was the grandson of the sub-judge of Calcutta High Court, Amin Suhrawardy. From his mother's side he was the great grandson of the famous poet and writer, Ubaidullah Al Ubaidi Suhrawardy and from his father's side he was the great grandson of the Sufi Pir Khwaja Fazal Mohammed. Syeda Zameerunnissa Begum, the 19th Century writer and social reformer was Amin's great grandmother. After finishing his schooling from Ravenshaw Collegiate School, Afzal-ul entered the field of politics where he emerged as a prominent Muslim leader in the town. Like his father, he too mobilized the Muslims of Odisha to join the Indian freedom struggle. During the 1942 Quit India movement, Amin worked in close association with Malati Choudhury and Ramadevi Choudhury, he organised various nationalist meetings at his place in Cuttack to gather support for the movement after Surajmal Shah and Bibhunendra Mishra were arrested in August 1942.

Post independence, Amin met with the then Prime Minister of India, Jawaharlal Nehru during his Odisha visit, India's President, Zakir Husain both in Cuttack as well as in Delhi, where Husain had invited Amin for high tea at his Delhi residence. Amin hosted India's first education minister, Abul Kalam Azad at Jalal mansion in Cuttack. Afzal-ul served as the chairman of Odisha board of Wakfs (State Muslim endowment board). He was also one of the most prominent Muslim councilors in the Cuttack municipality then. He was elected as the councilor continuously for 28 long years i.e. from 1952 to 1980, winning all the elections continuously. He had also been elected as the Vice Chairman of Cuttack Municipality. Afzal-ul was a member of the Indian National Congress (Organisation). In 1961 he was appointed as the general secretary of Utkal Pradesh Congress Committee by Biren Mitra. In 1971 he ran for the Cuttack State legislative assembly elections as an MLA candidate from the Indian National Congress (O) party. He was later appointed as the President of Odisha Mohammadan Association. Amin had also served as the secretary and chairperson of various reputed colleges in Cuttack including Indira Gandhi Women's College and Imarti Devi College.

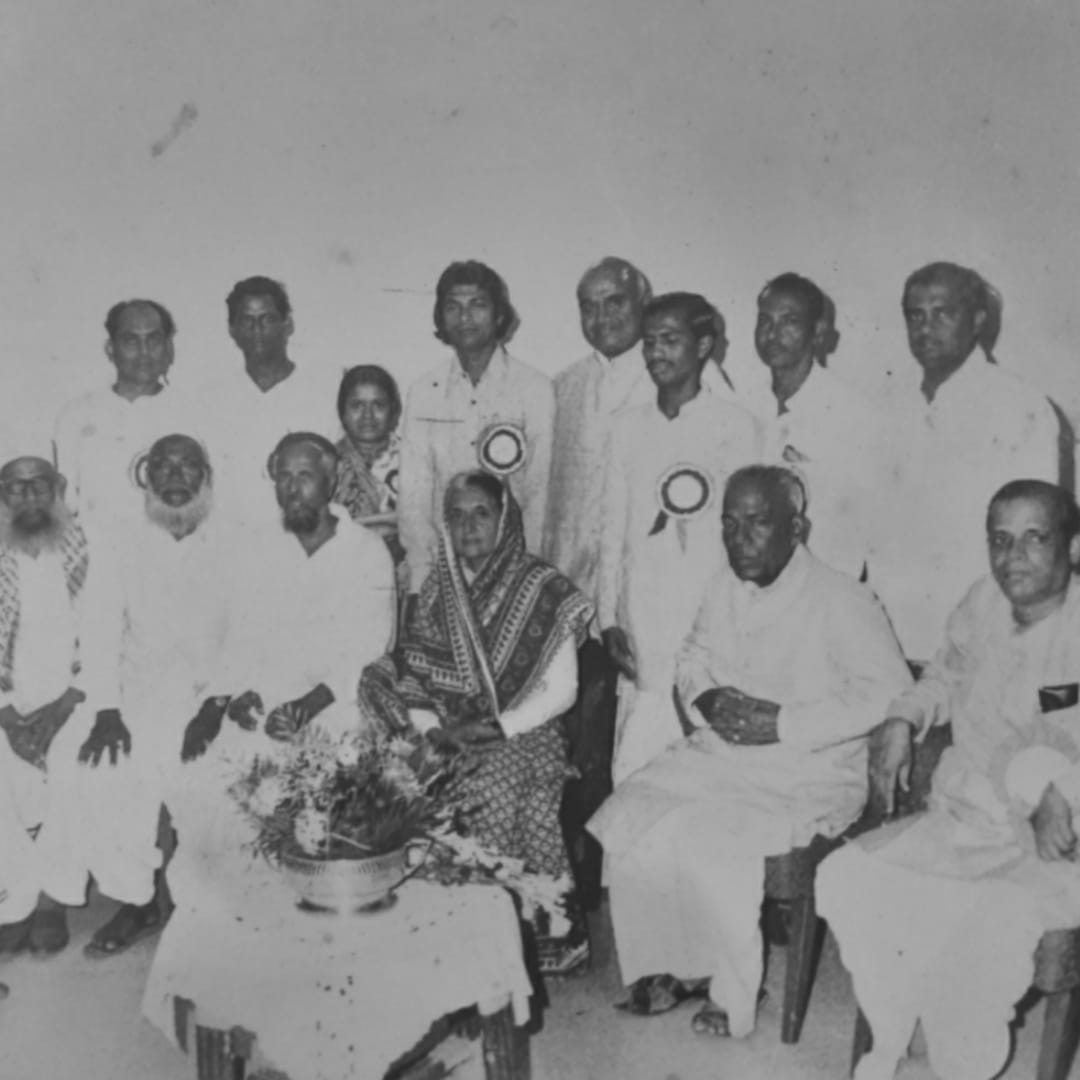
Amin seated in between the former Prime Minister of India, Indira Gandhi and the former chief minister of Odisha, Janaki Ballabh Patnaik at the Indian National Congress delegation meeting with Odia leaders.

Amin amplified and made significant contributions to the Bhudan movement in Odisha. During this time, four among the most prominent Chief ministers of Odisha, Biren Mitra, Nandini Satpathy, J.B. Patnaik & Biju Patnaik visited him at his residence. He served as the chairman in many emergency committees formed to help the people in the flood affected areas, during the floods in central Odisha.

Afzal-ul played a major role in preserving Urdu language in Cuttack. As the chairman of Cuttack Municipality's sub-committee on education he established five Urdu lower primary and five upper primary schools in Cuttack some of which include, Maulana Azad U.P school in Qadam Rasool.

== Marriage and family ==
Afzal-ul Amin married his second cousin, Syeda Roshanara Akhtar, the younger daughter of Ibrahim Suhrawardy, a notable author and linguist from Balasore of the Qadriyyah house and the granddaughter of Umdatunnissa, Nawab Begum of Kharui.

Afzal-ul has two daughters; Tabassum Amin Sultana, who married the notable politician and writer, Hussain Rabi Gandhi and Farhat Amin Sultana, a journalist and a social activist, who married the tribal rights activist, Saleem Farook.

== Death ==
Amin passed away on the morning of 28 May 1983, following a cardiac arrest. He was laid to rest the same day at Qadam-e-Rasool, which coincided with the sacred evening of Shab-e-Barat. As a mark of respect, his ward remained closed for an entire day. His funeral drew thousands of mourners, and due to the immense turnout and resulting traffic congestion, the procession had to be preponed. Among those who extended their condolences was J. B. Pattnaik, the then Chief Minister of Odisha. The following day, All India Radio, Cuttack, aired a special segment in his remembrance, honouring his life, service, and enduring contributions.
