= Harekrushna Mallick =

Indian politician (born 1931)

Member of Parliament, Rajya Sabha
- In office 1978–1984
- Constituency: Odisha

Personal details
- Born: 4 August 1931
- Party: Janata Party
- Spouse: Manasi Mallick

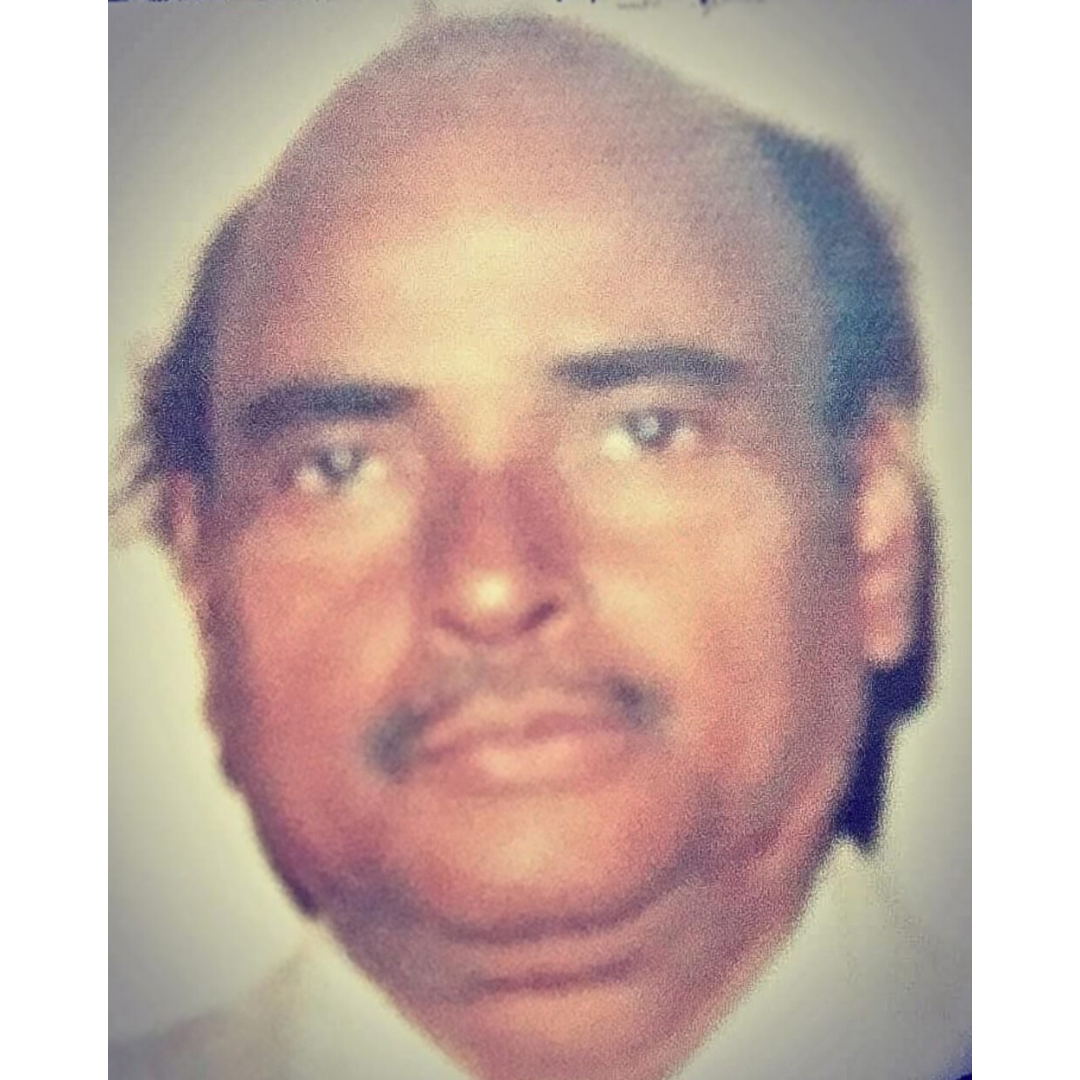
Dr Harekrushna Mallick

Harekrushna Mallick (born 4 August 1931) is an Indian physician, educationist, and former Member of Parliament in the Rajya Sabha, who represented Odisha from 1978 to 1984. Son of Prankrushna and Pranalata Mallick. A member of the Janata Party, he played a vital role in parliamentary debates and was known for his erudition, statesmanship, and ability to bridge political ideologies. Over the course of his career, he closely associated and collaborated with several of India's most distinguished political leaders including Biju Patnaik, Indira Gandhi, Manmohan Singh, and Pranab Mukherjee.

== Early life and education ==
Dr. Mallick was born to Prankrushna and Pranalata Mallick in Odisha. He pursued a career in medicine with a degree in pathology, becoming a gold medalist, and later combined his work in the health sector with public service. His scientific background and commitment to rural development shaped his later political engagements, especially in public health and education policy.

== Political career ==
Between 1974 and 1977 Dr Mallick was a vice-president of the Orissa Congress (O) faction affiliated to the Indian National Congress (Organisation) splinter faction which was a centre-right oriented faction having separated from the main Indian National Congress body and would later merge into the Janata Party.

Dr. Harekrushna Mallick joined the Janata Party following the national merger of the Congress-O faction and after a period of intense political realignment following the Emergency (1975–1977). In 1978, he was elected to the Rajya Sabha representing Odisha, where he served a six-year term until 1984. During his tenure, he worked with and debated alongside several political giants of the time and developed a reputation for being an articulate and balanced parliamentarian. His contributions were recognized across the political spectrum for their depth and thoughtfulness.

A contemporary of Bhairab Chandra Mahanti, Surendra Mohanty & Lakshmana Mahapatro in the Rajya Sabha, during his tenure Dr Harekrushna has participated in over 500 debates on wide range of subjects from sourcing of nuclear fuels, refugee settlement, climate, public health and education reforms, arts & cinema.

His speeches were scholarly, often infused with a scientific approach, and appealed to reason over rhetoric. He was considered one of the more intellectual voices in the Rajya Sabha during his term.

His siblings are Gopinath, Upendranath, Paramananda and geophysicist Kumarendra Mallick. His grandson Abhishek Mahananda is an Indian National Congress politician from Odisha.
