= Kharui Raj =

- Principality under the nominal sovereignty of Mughal Empire and British India
- 1624–1947
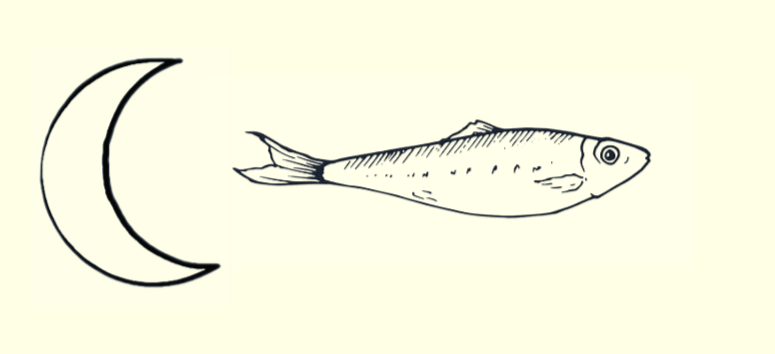
- Flag

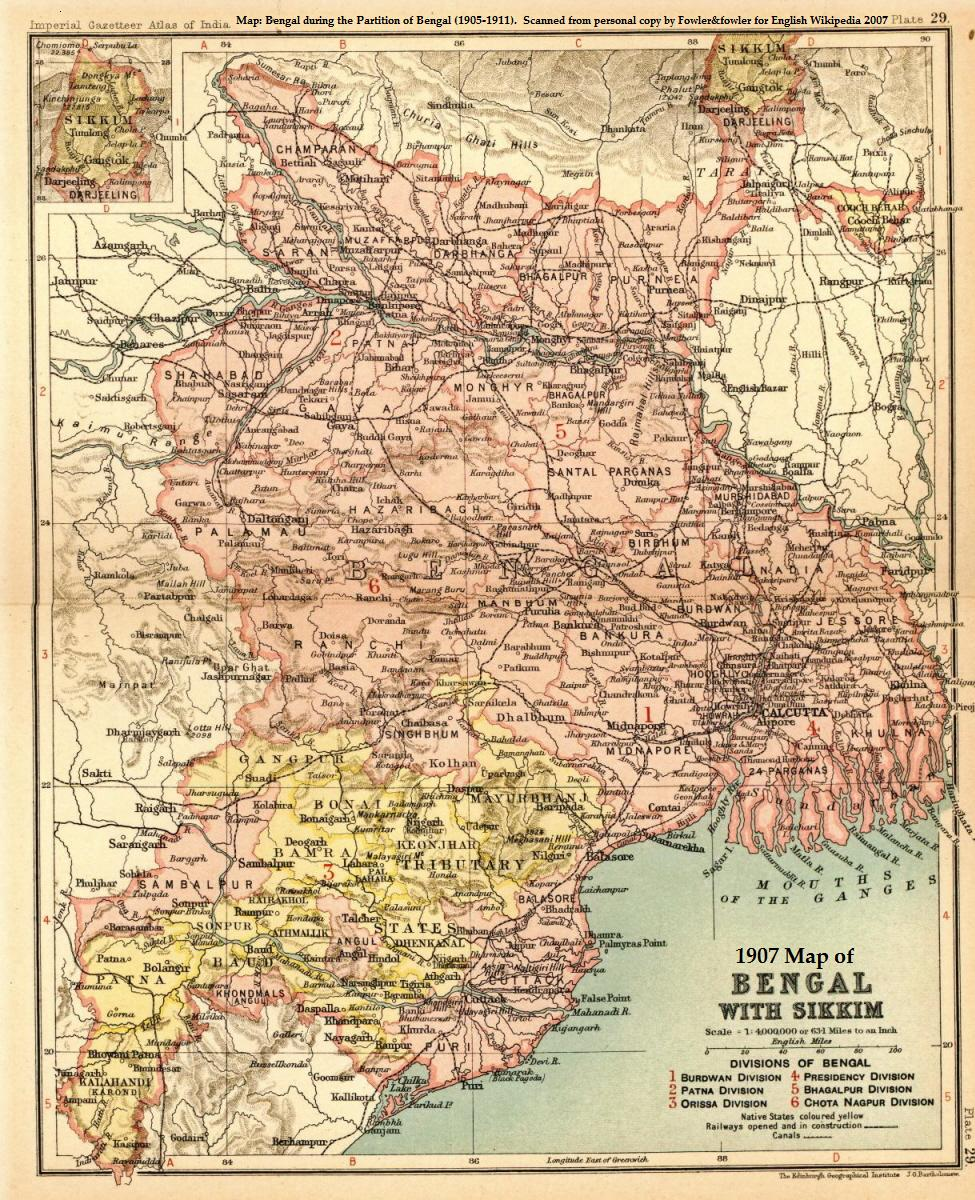
- Kharui Raj in the Imperial Gazetteer of India
- Capital: Kharui
- Historical era: Mughal era
  - Grant of jaagirdaari: 1624
  - Independence of India: 1947
Preceded by
Mughal Empire
Succeeded by
Nawab of Bengal
British East India Company
British Raj
- Today part of: West Bengal, India

Kharui Raj principality traces its origin nearly three centuries, before the advent of British Raj in India. It was ruled by the descendants of Sayyid dynasty. The clan were practically independent rulers in the period between the collapse of Mughal Empire and the rise of the British Raj. The rulers were the descendants of Hasan ibn Ali, hence they assumed Hassan as their family name.

== History ==
Kharui was granted as a Jaagirdaari to Syed Shah Mohammad Hassan by the Mughal imperial crown prince Shah Jahan in 1624 for helping the future Emperor seek asylum in Bengal after he was driven away from Agra and Deccan. Shah Mohammad assisted Shahjahan in launching an attack on Akbarnagar, by providing him a safe passage through Midnapur and Burdwan. At Akbarnagar, Shahjahan defeated and killed Ibrahim Khan Fath-i-Jang on April 20, 1624. Mohammad Hassan led Shahjahan's armies to Dhaka, where the Emperor rewarded jaagirs and precious gifts to his loyal generals. Shah Mohammad received the jaagirdaari of Kharui near the fertile Rupnarayan river.

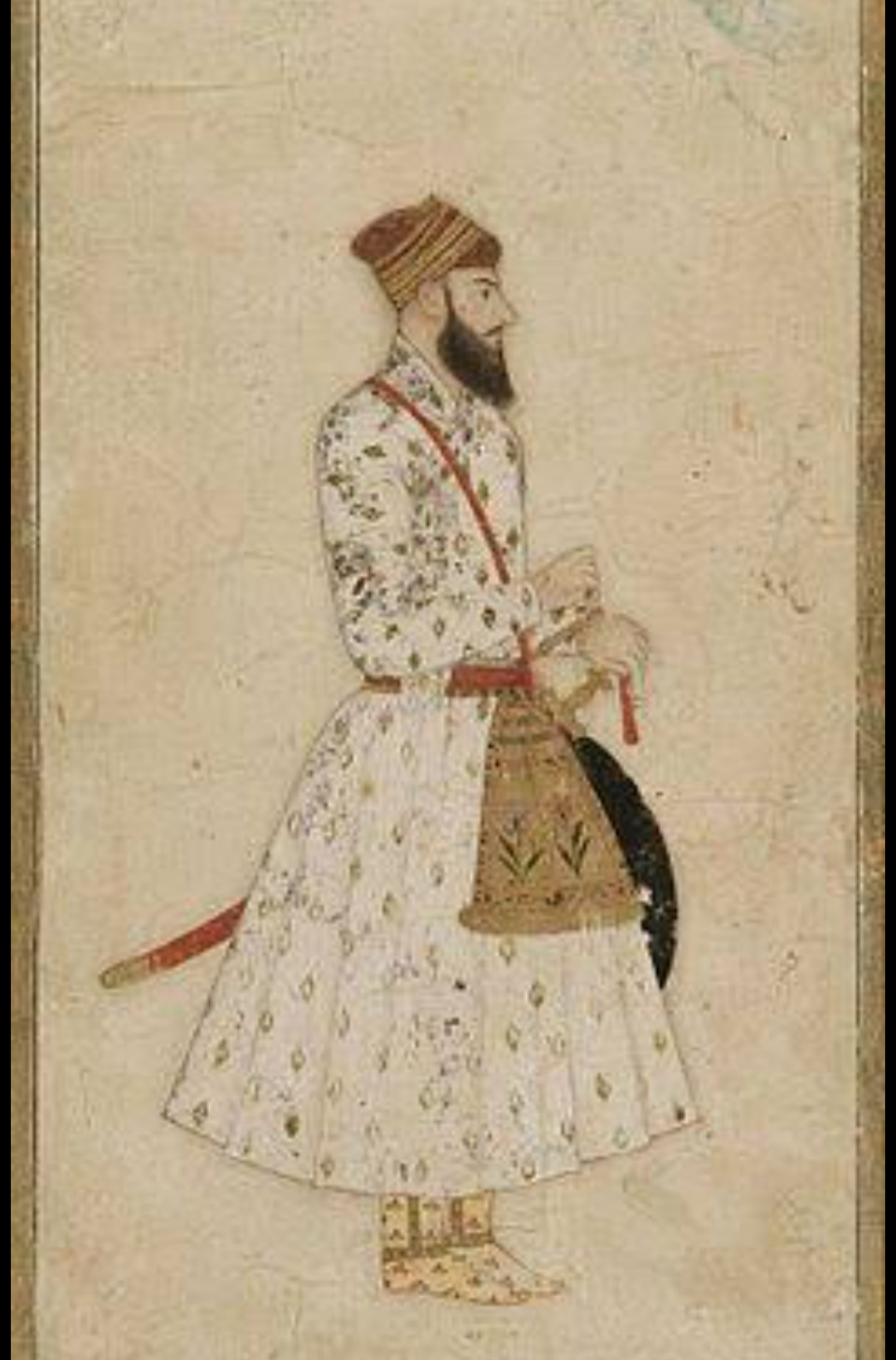
Portrait of Nawab Syed Shah Mohammad Hassan of Kharui Raj

Shah Mohammad was succeeded by his son, Syed Humayun Shah Hassan, who was an able ruler. Shah Jahan had already ascended the Mughal throne by then. In 1631 the Portuguese started trafficking Mughal officials and the Mughal controlled port of Saptagram fell. Shah Jahan ordered Qasim Khan to drive out the Portuguese from Hoogly. Humayun Shah Hassan was ordered to march towards Hoogly with his forces from the west, crossing the Rupnarayan river. On September 25, 1632, the Mughal army raised the imperial banners and launched an attack on Hoogly and gained control over the entire Bandel region.

After Bengal came under the Nawabs of Bengal, the rulers of Kharui remained semi independent and paid tributes to the Empire and governed their territories independently. After the British victory in the Battle of Buxar, the Diwani of Bengal, Bihar and Orissa was handed over to the British as per the treaty of Allahabad. Subsequently, all the Mughal principalities and smaller kingdoms ruled by Muslim and Hindu dynasties, including Kharui Raj were reduced to Zamindari estates and their armies were disbanded. In 1872, the British government awarded the title of "Nawab" to the 9th ruler of Kharui, Nawab Syed Ahmed Hassan for his efforts to help the common people during the Bengal famine. Nawab Syed Ahmed Hassan was married to Unmadatunissa Begum Sahiba, a daughter of Nawab Zahir Shah Mirza of Singranatore family. Owing to the sunset law and other harsh economic reform policies introduced by the British, Nawab Ahmed Hassan lost the biggest haat, the Banapore haat of Kharui to the British. He filed a case against the competent authorities in the Court of Wards, Calcutta. He fell ill and was unable to attend the proceedings, that is when his wife, Umdatunnissa took the responsibilities on her own shoulder, went to Calcutta and fought the legal battle. After years, she won the case and Banapore haat was restored to Kharui Raj.

== Rulers ==
- Syed Shah Mohammad Hassan (1624–1630)
- Syed Humayun Shah Hassan (1630–1716)
- Syed Mahmud Shah Hassan (1716–1778)
- Syed Fateh Shah Hassan (1778–1818)
- Syed Feeroz Shah Hassan (1818-183?)
- Syed Asad Shah Hassan (183? - 1835)
- Syed Jahan Shah Hassan (1835–1842)
- Syed Humayun Shah Hassan II (1842–1851)
- Syed Ahmed Shah Hassan (1851–1921)
- Nawab Begum Umdatunnissa (regent, 1892–1912)
