= Ravenshaw Collegiate School =

Coordinates: 20.4637°N 85.8598°E

Ravenshaw Collegiate School, Cuttack
- ରେଭେନ୍‌ସା କଲିଜିଏଟ ସ୍କୁଲ, କଟକ
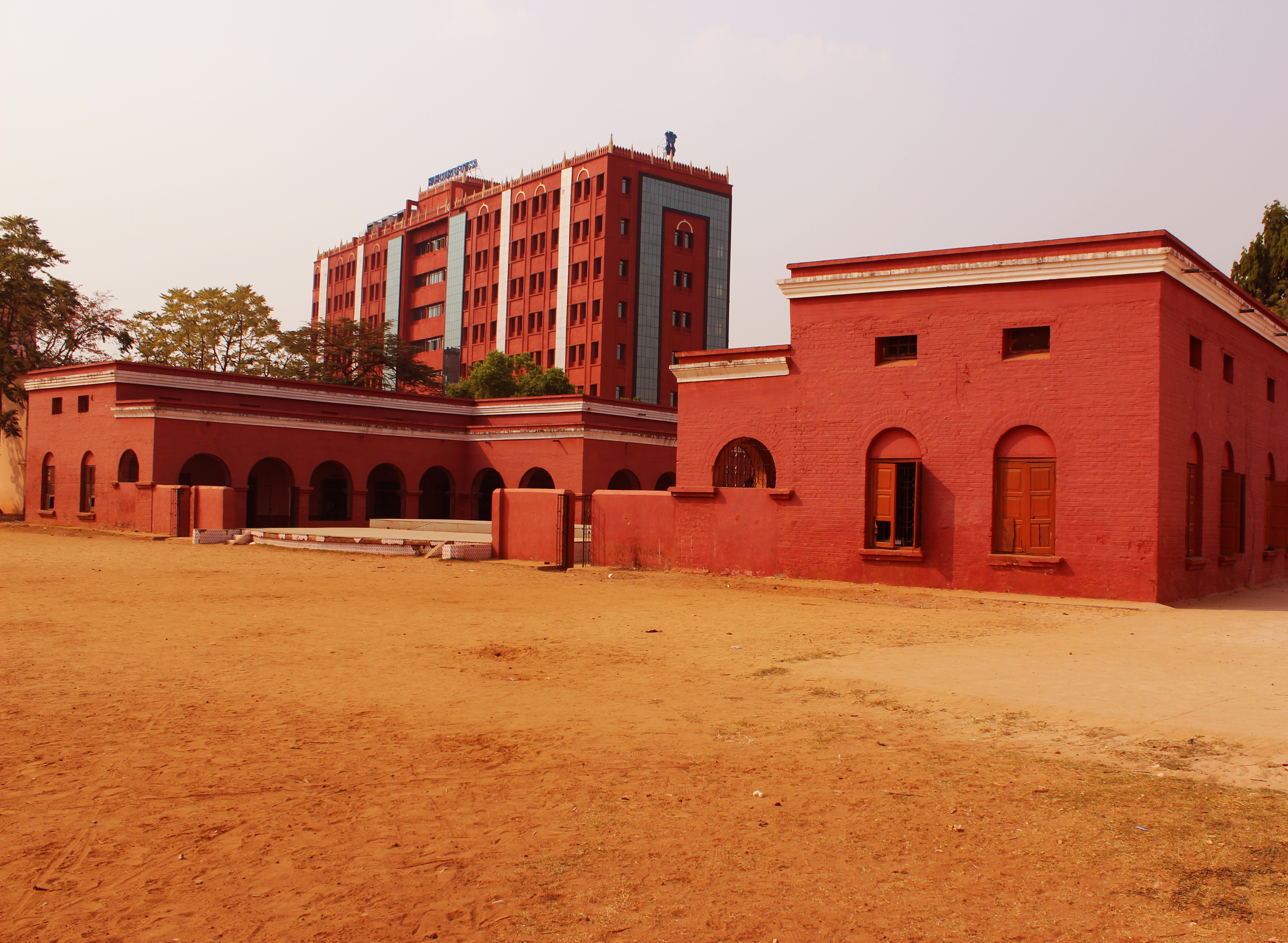
- Cuttack, Odisha, India

Information
- Type: Public High School
- Motto: Education for the Society.
- Founded: 1851; 175 years ago
- Founder: Thomas Edward Ravenshaw
- Head of school: Anusmita Swain
- Staff: 10+
- Faculty: 25+
- Grades: Class 4 - 10
- Gender: Boys and Girls
- Enrollment: 800+
- Language: Odia
- Campus size: 8 Acres
- Campus type: Urban
- Publication: The Chhatrabandhu
- Affiliation: B.S.E.O

Ravenshaw Collegiate School is the oldest High School of Odisha which was established in 1851 by Thomas Edward Ravenshaw in the District of Cuttack in Odisha, India. It was one of three institutions founded by Ravenshaw, the other two being the Ravenshaw Girls' School and the Ravenshaw College, the latter now having become Ravenshaw University.

== History ==
Ravenshaw Collegiate School was founded in 1851 though there are some confusions regarding the exact date of establishment. It was founded in the then-largest city of Odisha, Cuttack. In the initial years of the school, the Ravenshaw Junior College also used to function from the same campus until Ravenshaw College (now Ravenshaw University) was established. A new building was constructed in 1905, and the school is still operating from this heritage building.

== Campus ==
The current building in which the school operates was established in the year 1905. Before 1905 the school operated from adjacent buildings of the Odisha Bar Council. In 2006 Government of Odisha sanctioned Rs. 4 Crores for the school development but later on it was scrapped due to some unknown reasons. The campus of the school is spread across 8 acres of land in the River Bank of Kathajodi. In the near vicinity of the school some high-profile offices like High Court of Odisha, District Collectorate of Cuttack, State Treasury of Odisha and Odisha Revenue Board are also present. The school has a playground inside its campuses and own another mini stadium known as Sunshine Fields a few kilometers away from the school. The school has two hostels with a combined capacity of 200 inmates. The school has also two auditoriums inside the campus.

== School activities ==
=== House system ===
The school has one section in Class IV and V. In Class VI and VII it has two sections each. From Class VIII onwards each class comprises three sections. Each section can have a maximum of 65 students.

=== Sports ===
The school has an on-campus playground of about 2 acres which is used for day-to-day activities of students. The school also has a dedicated stadium which is used for special sporting events. The school has a recognised state-level cricket team. Sports include football, badminton and indigenous games like khokho and kabaddi.

=== Clubs and societies ===
Clubs include a science club, computer club, cultural club and sports club. Each year 4 students from science club are chosen by State Government for 1-week sessions by eminent scientists of Odisha on different subjects. The Cultural Club organises the annual cultural event.

=== N.C.C. ===
N.C.C. or National Cadet Corps has been with the school since its founding days. Pupils from class VIII and IX are allowed to join NCC and NSS. RCS was one of the first schools to have a girls' wing of NCC. Upon successful completion, students are given NCC 'A' Certificates.

=== Scouts and Guides ===
RCS also has Scouts and Guides wing for pupils of all three higher classes.

=== Computer education ===
School has about 50 computers for the pupils. Two computer teachers are engaged to impart computer education to the students from grade IV to IX.

== Notable alumni ==
- Subhas Chandra Bose (1897–1945), Indian nationalist leader, Freedom Fighter and leader of Indian National Army
- Radhanath Rath (1896–1996), member of the Odisha Legislative Assembly and cabinet minister
- Rahmat Ali Rahmat, (1891–1963), Indian mathematician, a litterateur and a poet of Urdu
- Biju Pattanaik (1916–1997), former Chief Minister of Odisha, and India's Freedom Fighter
- Madhusudan Das (1848–1934), main architect information of Odisha as a special state and India's Freedom Fighter
- Sayeed Mohammed (1891-1922), notable educationist, freedom fighter and the founder of the nationalist school, Sayeed Seminary.
- Kartar Singh Sarabha (1896-1915), Great freedom fighter of Gadar Movement
- Dayanidhi Choudhury (1916-2000), former Chief Conservator of Forests, First Odia IFS
- Pradip Kumar Mohanty, former Chief Justice of Jharkhand High Court
- Kumarendra Mallick Geophysicist, Recipient of Shanti Swarup Bhatnagar Prize for Science and Technology
- Afzal-ul Amin (1915-1983), Indian freedom fighter and statesman.
- Karamat Ali Karamat (1936 – 2022), Indian Urdu language poet, author, literary critic and mathematician.
