= Achyutananda Mahananda =

Indian politician (1924–1991)

Member of the Odisha Legislative Assembly
- In office 1971–1974
- Constituency: Kantabanji
- In office 1957–1971
- Constituency: Titlagarh
- In office 1952–1957
- Constituency: Bolangir

Chief Whip of Government, Odisha Legislative Assembly

Achyutananda Mahananda (21 April 1924—15 April 1991) was an Indian politician from Odisha, known for his contributions to the state's political landscape and early Dalit politics in Odisha. He served as a cabinet minister in charge of Forest and Animal Husbandry during the tenure of Chief Minister Nandini Satpathy and was elected as a Member of the Odisha Legislative Assembly (MLA) five times, representing various constituencies from the western Odisha belt.

== Early life and education ==
Mahananda was born on April 21, 1924, in Mandal village, located in the Balangir district of Odisha. He was the son of Late Sundar Mahananda. He was married to Smt. Udiachand Mahananda and had a deep interest in agriculture, often engaging in cultivation as a hobby. His commitment to social causes was evident through his special interest in the upliftment of Harijans (Dalits) and Adivasis (tribal communities). He resided in Ichhapara via Muribahal in the Balangir district.

== Political career ==
Mahananda embarked on his political journey in 1950. He initially aligned with the All India Ganatantra Parishad and later joined the Swatantra Party. His political acumen and dedication led him to serve as the General Secretary of the Orissa Depressed Class League and as the Vice-President of the All-Orissa Chaukidar Sangha. He was also a member of the State Handloom Board. Between 1957 and 1961, he held the position of Whip for the Opposition Party in the Odisha Legislative Assembly. From 1970 to 1972, he served as the Government Chief Whip. In June 1972, he joined the Indian National Congress (R).

His legacy is continued by his grandson Abhishek Mahananda who is also a dalit politician from Balangir and is also active in the digital realm, being instrumental in highlighting numerous matter pertaining to the treatment of the depressed classes.

=== Legislative tenure ===
Mahananda's legislative career was marked by his representation of multiple constituencies:

- 1st Assembly (1952–1957): elected from Bolangir constituency as a member of the All India Ganatantra Parishad.
- 2nd Assembly (1957–1961): represented Titilagarh constituency under the All India Ganatantra Parishad.
- 3rd Assembly (1961–1967): re-elected from Titilagarh, this time as a member of the Swatantra Party.
- 4th Assembly (1967–1971): continued his representation of Titilagarh with the Swatantra Party.
- 5th Assembly (1971–1973): elected from Kantabanji constituency as a Swatantra Party candidate.
