= Abhishek Mahananda =

Indian politician

Personal details
- Party: Indian National Congress
- Profession: Politician

Abhishek Mahananda is an Indian politician and public figure from the Indian National Congress and is currently serving as National Coordinator in the Social Media & Digital Platforms of the AICC (All India Congress Committee) and is also the former Odisha Pradesh Congress Committee Social Media Chairman.

== Personal life & Family background ==
Abhishek Mahananda is son of late Bijay & Ashima Mahananda. His mother Ashima was a senior woman politician of Odisha & a senior member of the All India Mahila Congress who believed in the ideology of social liberalism, secularism propagated by the Indian National Congress. She also served as a member in the State Commission for Women . Abhishek Mahananda is also the grandson of Late Achyutananda Mahananda, a former Cabinet Minister & five times MLA in the Odisha Legislative Assembly. Abhishek's maternal grand father Dr.Harekrushna Mallick was a Rajya Sabha MP and a gold medalist in medicine also a practicing doctor. His uncle Hrushikesh Mahananda who was the first Member of Parliament from Bolangir Lok Sabha Parliamentary Constituency underscoring the family's commitment towards social work and public welfare.

Abhishek Mahananda is married to Pooja Arora Mahananda, a commerce graduate based in New Delhi. She plays a vital role in their shared business ventures. The couple has a daughter named Aashima Mahananda, named after Abhishek’s deceased mother, Ashima Mahananda.

=== Education & Professional Interests ===
Abhishek Mahananda holds a Post Graduate Diploma in Management in 2006 from the Institute for Integrated Learning in Management – Graduate School of Management. He is an entrepreneur with ventures in the food and beverage industry, media and broadcasting, having incorporated Union Foods with brands like Blue Voda and digital media advertising with information broadcasting venture under DMac Network. He also owns an online news and current affairs known as NewsAlert24x7 having a distinct pan Odisha news coverage which also covers national and world news.

He co-founded Mahananda Petroleum & Chemicals Private Limited in 2019, showcasing his interests in the industrial and energy sectors.

=== Sports & Personal Interests ===
He is an accomplished snooker & billiards player having competed in national championships held across India. Abhishek is also a former cricketer who played as a medium fast bowler and as a middle order batsman in the Junior State under-16 category. Abhishek was trained at Odisha's prestigious Saheed Sporting Club under coach Kamal Ganguly where he trained and played along with future international players like Debashish Mohanty and Pragyan Ojha.

== Political life ==
Mahananda had contested from Cuttack Sadar (Vidhan Sabha constituency) and lost the election. He is part of the growing cohort of millennial politicians from Odisha like Saptagiri Ulaka, Sasmit Patra and Sofia Firdous. As a prominent opposition party member and a senior functionary with the AICC, Mahananda has been a strong critic of the former BJD led government of Naveen Patnaik and also of the current BJP led Mohan Charan Majhi government in Odisha. In April 2019, he contested the election to the Odisha Legislative Assembly from Cuttack Sadar (Vidhan Sabha constituency) on an Odisha Congress.

=== List of positions held in the Indian National Congress ===
1. National Coordinator in the All India Congress Committee (AICC) Social Media & Digital Platforms Department: 2023–present
2. Spokesperson and Convenor - Media & Communication Odisha Pradesh Congress Committee : 2023- present
3. AICC Member 2022-2027
4. Chairman Social Media & Digital Platforms Odisha Pradesh Congress Committee: 2017–2023
5. OPCC Member 2017 & 2022
6. Convenor Social Media & Digital Platforms, Odisha Pradesh Congress Committee: 2015-2017
7. IYC Coordinator, Indian Youth Congress: 2010
8. State Secretary NSUI Odisha Unit: 2004 - 2007
