= Farhat Amin =

Indian journalist

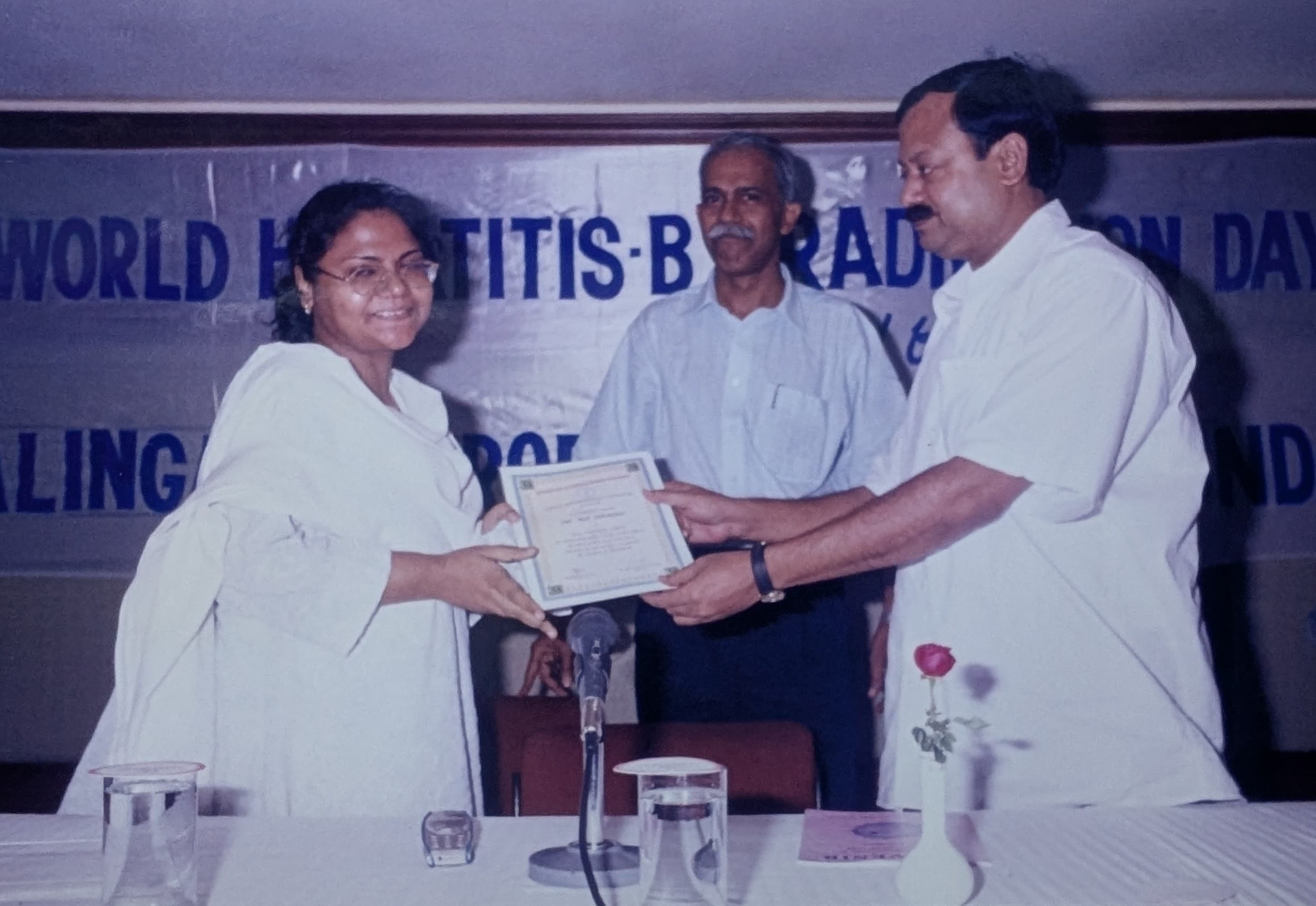
- Amin receiving the first KGF Samana from DP Mishra, Odisha's former health minister
- Born: 26 February 1967 (age 59); Cuttack, Odisha, India
- Education: Ravenshaw University
- Occupations: Journalist, social activist
- Spouse: Saleem Farook (m. 1998; died 2000)
- Children: 1
- Parents: Afzal-ul Amin (father); Syeda Roshanara Akhtar (mother)
- Relatives: Sayeed Mohammed (paternal grandfather); Begum Badar un nissa Akhtar (paternal grandmother); Amin Suhrawardy (paternal great grandfather); Hussain Rabi Gandhi (brother-in-law); Ibrahim Suhrawardy (maternal grandfather)
- Family: Suhrawardy family

Farhat Amin, also known by her pen name Minoodi is an Indian journalist, cartoonist and social activist. She is Odisha's state convenor of Bharatiya Muslim Mahila Andolan, a national rights based organisation which fights for the rights of Muslim women. Farhat is the founder and chief functionary of BIRD Trust, a non-governmental organisation which works for the upliftment of marginalized women in Odisha. She is the pioneer of Muslim women movement in Odisha. In 2005 she was enlisted in the directory of Development journalists published by the prestigious Press Institute of India.

== Early life and education ==
Farhat Amin was born on 26 February 1967 in Cuttack, Odisha, as the younger of two daughters of the notable politician and social worker of Cuttack, Afzal-ul Amin and his wife Syeda Roshanara Akhtar. Farhat is the granddaughter of the eminent educationist and freedom fighter, Sayeed Mohammed. The renowned Bengali writer, Ubaidullah Al Ubaidi Suhrawardy is Farhat's great-great-grandfather.

Farhat completed her early education at P.M. Academy and St.Joseph Girl's high school, she then did her graduation in English Literature (hons) from Sailabala Women's College, Cuttack. Farhat completed her master's in English literature from Ravenshaw University in 1987. Later she joined the field of Journalism after doing a P.G Diploma in Journalism and Mass communication from St. Nivedita's college in Kolkata.

== Career ==
Farhat began her career in journalism as the sub-editor of Sun Times, later as a columnist she designed, illustrated and edited a weekly column for children (Kid's corner) of the Sun Times under the pen name Minoodi. In July 1992 Farhat joined Hindustan Times as its Cuttack Correspondent and wrote news, reports and articles.

In 1998 Farhat married Saleem Farook, a social activist from Coorg, Karnataka who worked for the tribals in Kalahandi. Farhat then wrote and illustrated articles for various national and local dailies and magazines as a freelance journalist. During this time she had the opportunity to meet and interview former chief minister of Kerala E.M.S. Namboodiripad, columnist Kushwant Singh, freedom fighter Manmohini Sahgal and poet Amrita Pritam for various dailies and magazines.

Farhat received a Media Fellowship from Oxfam to work on Violence Against Women in Southeast Asia before the campaign started in Odisha in 2004. She worked as a campaign manager for We Can, Odisha. It was during this period that she realised the plight of Muslim and Dalit women who were doubly oppressed from within and outside the community.

She is the current state convenor of Bharatiya Muslim Mahila Andolan, Odisha and has been working for women with a special focus on Muslim and Dalit women for over sixteen years. As a part of it she has been organizing awareness programmes for Muslim and Dalit women in 6 districts of Odisha including Cuttack, Jajpur, Khurda, Berhampur, Ganjam and Bhadrak. Under her convenorship surveys were conducted in Odisha regarding the Triple talaaq, Model Nikahnama, polygamy and other rights-based issues.

In 2008 she established her own non-governmental organisation called BIRD (Bold Initiatives Research and Documentation), which works for the empowerment, justice, health, education and employment of marginalized women in Odisha.

She was a member of the Free legal Aid committee of Odisha State Legal Authority and also a member of the ethical committee of Srirama Chandra Bhanja Medical College and Hospital, Cuttack. She is currently a life member of Odisha State Council for child welfare.

=== Masjid entry ===
In November 2007, the fortnightly Violence Against Women awareness programme was held in Odisha under her convenorship. With permission from the Masjid authorities, the programme was scheduled to be conducted inside the library of the Masjid premises. Farhat asked the senior authority of the Masjid if the women could offer namaz in the mosque to which he said yes. He instructed the women to enter the masjid through another door and offer namaz in the library.

As Farhat would do in all the programmes, before this programme she had informed the local police station. Her journalist friends picked the news and soon ‘Muslim women entering the mosque’ was all over the media. Around 100 women who had finished the training programme were ready to offer namaz in the mosque. The mosque authorities then allowed only 5 women, which Farhat politely refused as they were more in number, hence the women offered namaz under the shamiana itself. Farhat told the media that they were not offering namaz inside the mosque because the mosque was too small to accommodate all the women who had come for the programme. When the journalists met the mosque head, the mosque authority developed cold feet and backed out saying that they did not give permission to anyone for offering namaz inside the mosque or in the shamiana and that Farhat and her team had forcibly entered the Masjid. This became a huge issue and a fatwa was passed against her.

Anjuman-Islamia Ahle Sunnat-o-Jammat, the apex body of the Muslim community in the city issued a fatwa to all the 33 mosques in the city to stop women from praying at public places, in spite of the fact that Muslim women are not barred from praying in public by the Shariat. However the practice is generally discouraged in India. But in big mosques, there are separate enclosures for women which again are seldom used. In 2020, 13 years after this incident had taken place in Cuttack, the All India Muslim Personal Law Board, the leading body of Muslim opinion in India declared that women can enter mosques, stating that Islam allows its women to pray in mosques.

== Awards ==
In 2005 she was awarded the Kalinga Gastroenterology Foundation Samana for spreading public awareness and striving to eradicate the menace of Hepatitis B among children. Her story of facilitating the vaccination programme was later featured in Femina Magazine India.

In 2009 she was felicitated by, Murlidhar Chandrakant Bhandare the then Governor of Odisha on Women's Day in the National Alliance of Women Organisation's (NAWO) meet in Bhubaneswar.
