= Nawabzadi Umdatunnissa Begum =

Nawab Begum Umdad-un-nissa
- Nawabzadi of Singranatore; Nawab Begum of Kharui Raj
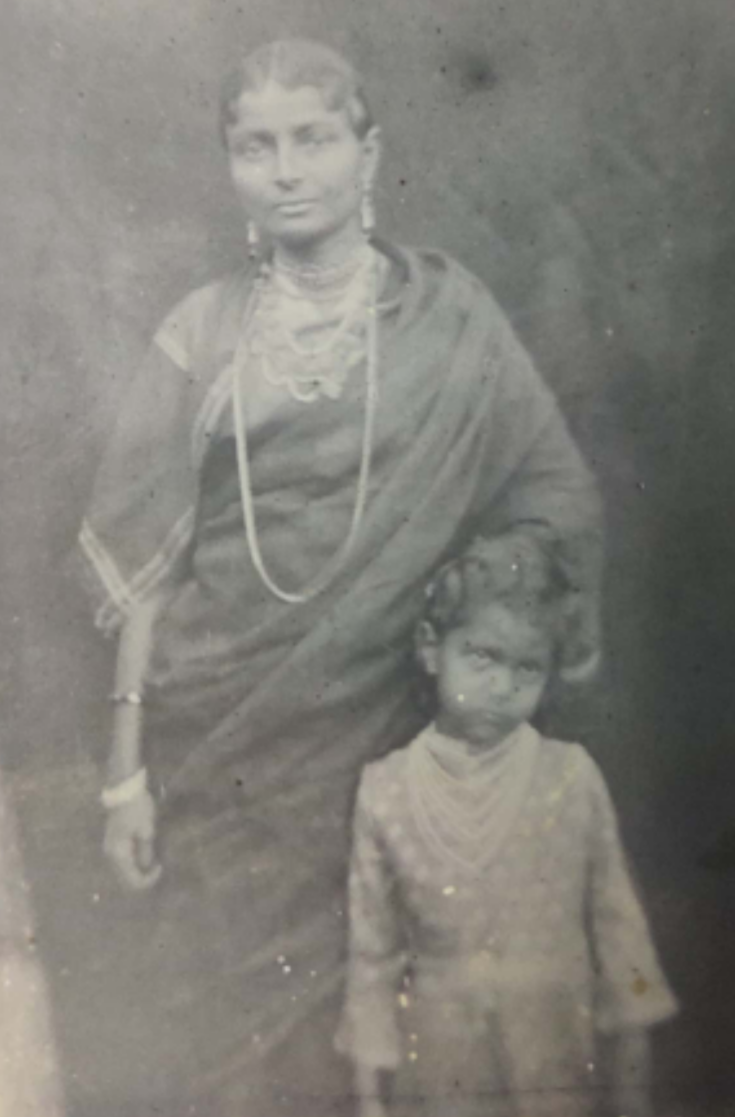
- Nawab Begum Umdatunnissa with her daughter Sahibzadi Syeda Ehsana Akhtar

Regent of Kharui Raj
- Regency: 19 June 1892 – 1912
- Predecessor: Nawab Syed Ahmed Hassan
- Successor: Nawab Syed Mahmud Hassan II (pretender)
- Born: 7 October 1871; Mirdha Mahal Rajbadi, Singra, Bengal Presidency, British India
- Died: 1912, Kharui Raj, Bengal Presidency, British India
- Spouse: Nawab Syed Ahmed Hassan
- Issue: Sahibzadi Syeda Ehsana Akhtar
- House: Timurid (by birth); Sayyid (by marriage)
- Father: Nawab Zahir Shah Mirza

Nawabzadi Umdatunnissa Begum (born as Princess Umdat-un-nissa Sultana of Singranatore; 1871–1912) was the queen consort of Nawab Syed Ahmed Hassan of Kharui Raj. She served as the regent of Kharui for 20 long years i.e. from 1892 to 1912. Nawab Begum gave up purdah and went to the Court of Wards, Calcutta to fight against the arbitrary economic policies introduced by the British, because of which her estate had suffered severe losses. She challenged the British government in their own court and won the legal battle against them, making her one of the first woman royalties in British Bengal to do so.

== Early life ==
Umdatunnissa was born into the royal family of Singranatore to Nawab Zahir Shah Mirza. Her family ruled over most of the regions that today makes up the modern districts of Natore and Singra in Bangladesh. She was the elder sister of Mirza Zafar. Her father, Zahir Shah was the grandson of Mirza Jahan Shah and the great-grandson of the Mughal Emperor Akbar II. She was thus of Mughal descent. After the fall of the Mughal Empire in the subcontinent and the expulsion of the imperial royal family to Rangoon and East India, post their defeat at the hands of the British in the 1857 War of Independence; her family's branch remained under cover and took refuge under the Maharaja of Natore and served as Mirdhas (defence minister) of the kingdom, until they assumed the rulership of Singra, which was granted to them as a compensation by the British, after they suppressed the Pabna rebellion in their region in 1871.

Umdad-un-nissa was homeschooled, much like her female primogenitors. She was well versed and fluent in Bengali, Urdu, Persian and knew some English. When she reached the legal age, she was married off to Nawab Syed Ahmed Hassan of Kharui Raj.

== Regency and legal battle ==
During the late 1880s, the British government introduced a series of economic reforms which aimed at the annexation of territories and exploitation of peasants. Owing to one such law, the biggest haat of Kharui Raj, the Banapore haat was arbitrarily auctioned and sold out by the British. Nawab Syed Ahmed Hassan filed a case against the competent authorities at Court of Wards (India) and went up to Calcutta to fight the case. He however took ill and was unable to attend the proceedings at Calcutta. Unmadatunissa took it upon herself to fight the case, she gave up purdah and went to Calcutta. She was determined to get back Banapore from the British and after 3 long years of legal battle, she finally won the case and Banapore was restored to her husband's state.

Umdatunnissa donated lands in Uttarpara to build Kharui union school. She had only one daughter, Sahibzadi Syeda Ehsana Akhtar who was married into one of the most prominent families of Bengal, the Suhrawardy family to Ibrahim Suhrawardy.

== Death ==
Umdatunnissa died in 1912 due to pneumonia.
