= Sayeed Seminary =

Sayeed Seminary High School, Cuttack
- ସୟିଦ୍ ସେମିନାରୀ ସ୍କୁଲ, କଟକ
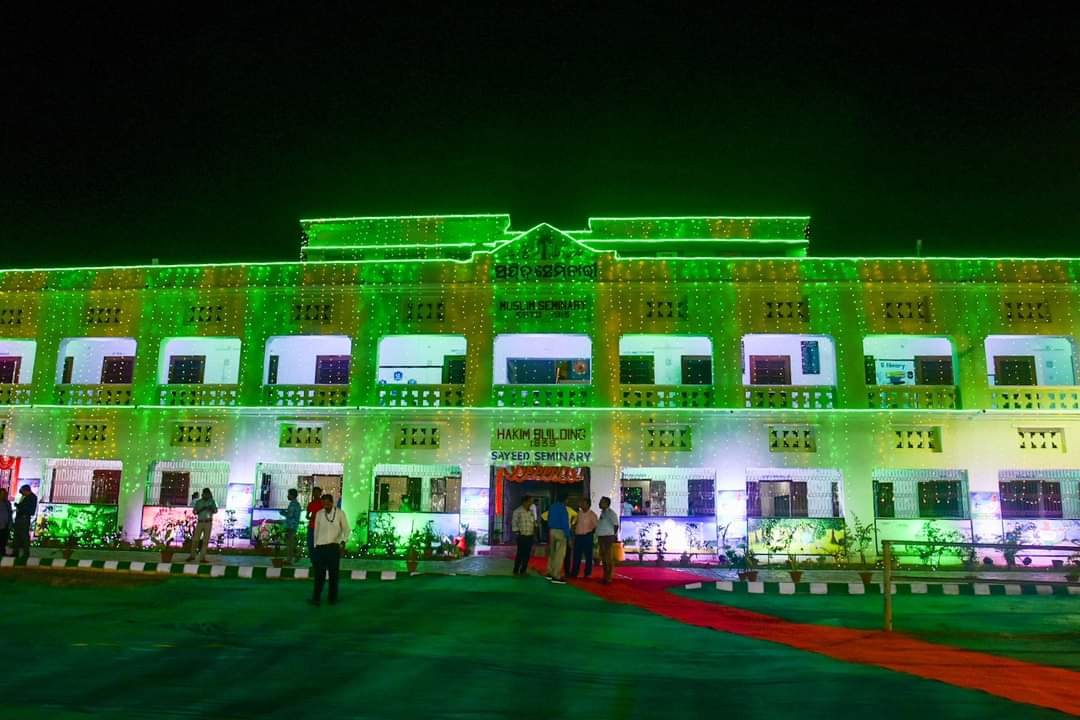

Location
- Cuttack, Odisha, India; 20.466754°N 85.875603°E

Information
- Former name: Moslem Seminary
- Type: Public High School
- Founded: August 8, 1913; 112 years ago
- Founder: Sayeed Mohammed
- Staff: 10+
- Faculty: 25+
- Grades: Class 4 - 10
- Gender: Boys and Girls
- Enrollment: 800+
- Language: Odia
- Campus size: 9.75 Acres
- Campus type: Urban
- Colours: Blue and White
- Affiliation: Board of Secondary Education, Odisha

Sayeed Seminary School is a public school located in the heart of Cuttack city, India. It was established in 1913 by Sayeed Mohammed, a prominent Odia freedom fighter, scholar and educationist. The school is credited to be the second nationalist school of Odisha and is one of the two institutions bearing the name of Sayeed Mohammed, the other one being Sayeed Seminary Primary School, which is located within the campus of the former.

== History ==
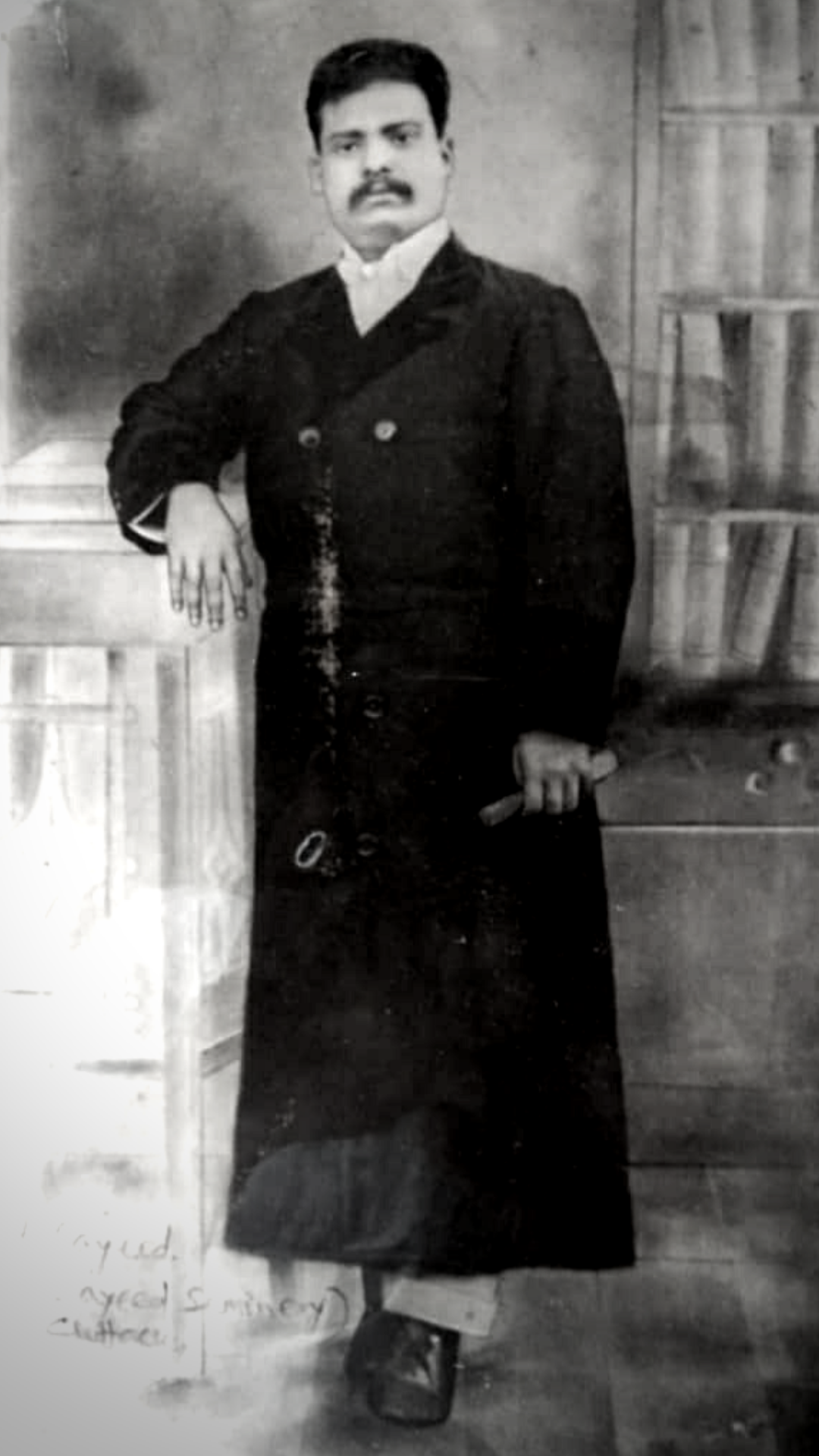
Sayeed Mohammed, the founder of Sayeed Seminary

A series of events and factors led to the establishment of the school, one being the discrimination that the Indian students were facing in the British administered schools back in the late 19th CE; the second was, under the British government, education wasn't accessible for the general Indian masses, only the children from upper-class families could get an admission and the third being the marginalization of the Muslim community, since Indian Muslims did not accept English as the medium of instruction in educational institutions, they turned away from formal schools and remained illiterate which alienated them from the newly evolving modern society and relegated them to the background. Sayeed Mohammed having studied in Calcutta, which was then the capital of British India and the center stage of colonial politics, had developed a good understanding of these factors.

The immediate cause, however, surfaced when the British government, in a deliberate attempt to divide the religious communities, introduced a new policy which provided separate reservations for Hindu and Muslim students. Sayeed Mohammed, who was then the assistant headmaster of Victoria high school vehemently opposed these divisive and discriminatory policies of the British government and organized mass protests against them. Since Sayeed was also a member of Utkal Sammilani and had participated in many nationalist movements before, the British perceived him as a threat and he was thus asked to resign from his post. Sayeed therefore got determined to start a new school where Indian students from all walks of life, communities and classes could access education and nationalist sentiments could be sowed into their young minds. Opportunity presented itself in 1909 when Gopabandhu Das established the first nationalist school of Odisha, the Satyabadi Bana Bidyalaya at Puri. Inspired by this, Sayeed started working on establishing the Muslim Seminary at Cuttack. He mobilized the muslim community by spreading awareness about the cause initially and in 1913 he finally founded the school.

The school formally opened on Friday, the 8th of August, 1913 with 500 students on its roll in a rented building. It was largely dependent on donations. Meanwhile, Sayeed managed to persuade a generous merchant of Madras, C. Abdul Hakeem to donate the present land. Even the Nizam of Hyderabad, Mir Osman Ali Khan, made a monthly grant of Rs 50 to the institution. A managing committee was formed by Sayeed in 1913 and Maulavi Golam Mohammad, Mohammad Kasim Ahmad Quazi, Kameeruddin Khan, Alla Bira, Mahammad Sayeed Abdus Sakur, Babu Akshay Chandra Ray, Satyabrata Patnaik and Devendranath Ray were appointed as its members. The school strongly promoted the ideas of nationalism among its students; Sayeed had made it mandatory for all the teachers and students of the school to wear clothes made of Khadi in order to support the ongoing Swadeshi movement. He himself wore clothes only made of Khadi to set an example.

After Sayeed's death, Moulavi Golam Mohammad was appointed as its president and Akshay Chandra Ray, its vice president. The efforts made by Sayeed Mohammed was acknowledged and appreciated by the Secretary to Government of Bihar and Orissa Province, Ministry of Education and such appreciation was notified and published in the Official Gazette dated 1 December 1932.

After the partition of 1947, its name was changed from 'Muslim Seminary' to 'Sayeed Seminary' in the memory of its late founder, to throw a more secular light at the institution. Sayeed Seminary was recognised as a High School from 1 June 1945 as revealed in the Orissa Gazette No.30 dated 3.8.1945. The school came into the direct payment system from 1974 for teaching staff and from 1977 for the non-teaching staff.

== Affiliation ==
The school is affiliated to Board of Secondary Education, Odisha

== Notable alumni ==
Sayeed Seminary became a reputed high school in the city, that offered education to both Muslim and Hindu students in Urdu and Odia. The school has produced many distinguished alumni including,

- Mohammad Mohsin, Film director and actor
- Syed Mustafiz Ahmed, Minister
