= Cuttack Sadar Assembly constituency =

Constituency of the Odisha legislative assembly in India

Coordinates: 20.42°N 85.88°E

Cuttack Sadar
- Constituency No. 93 for the Odisha Legislative Assembly

Constituency details
- Country: India
- Region: East India
- State: Odisha
- Division: Central Division
- District: Cuttack
- Lok Sabha constituency: Cuttack
- Established: 1957
- Total electors: 2,29,006 (Note: as on 2024) (Note: as data published by election commission)
- Reservation: SC

Member of Legislative Assembly
- 17th Odisha Legislative Assembly
- Incumbent Prakash Chandra Sethi
- Party: Bharatiya Janata Party
- Elected year: 2024

Cuttack Sadar is a Vidhan Sabha constituency of Cuttack district, Odisha.

This constituency includes Cuttack Sadar block, 3 wards of Cuttack and 14 Gram panchayats (Santapur, Isaniberhampur, Manpur, Janardanpur, Sirlo, Babujanga, Uttarkul, Manijanga, Palada, Mahammadpur, Nemalo, Tilakana, Kalamishri and Bandhupur) Nischintakoili block.

== Elected members ==
Vote share of winning candidates
2024	48.49%
2019	55.41%
2014	50.94%
2009	63.78%
2004	46.25%
2000	35.85%
1995	46.98%
1990	66.04%
1985	52.27%
1980	47.88%
1977	57.71%

Since its formation in 1951, 17 elections were held till date. It was a 2-member constituency for 1952 & 1957.

List of members elected from Cuttack Sadar constituency are:

Year	Member	Party
2024	Prakash Chandra Sethi	Bharatiya Janata Party
2019	Chandra Sarathi Behera	Biju Janata Dal
2014	Chandra Sarathi Behera	Biju Janata Dal
2009	Kalindi Behera	Biju Janata Dal
2004	Pravat Ranjan Biswal	Independent politician
2000	Nibedita Pradhan	Bharatiya Janata Party
1995	Bijayalaxmi Sahoo	Indian National Congress
1990	Rajendra Singh	Janata Dal
1985	Dolagobinda Pradhan	Indian National Congress
1980	Dolagobinda Pradhan	Indian National Congress (I)
1977	Sangram Keshari Mahapatra	Janata Party
1974	Trilochan Kanungo	Indian National Congress
1971	Sura Sethi	Indian National Congress (R)
1967	Sukadeva Jena	Orissa Jana Congress
1961	Laxman Mallick	Indian National Congress
1957 (Note: It was a 2 member constituency)	Purnananda Samal	Indian National Congress
1957	Raj Krushna Bose	Indian National Congress
1951 (Note: It was a 2 member constituency)	Laxman Mallick	Indian National Congress
1951	Bhairab Chandra Mohanty	Indian National Congress

== Election results ==
=== 2024 ===
Voting were held on 25 May 2024 in 3rd phase of Odisha Assembly Election & 6th phase of Indian General Election. Counting of votes was on 4 June 2024. In 2024 election, Bharatiya Janata Party candidate Prakash Chandra Sethi defeated Biju Janata Dal candidate Chandra Sarathi Behera by a margin of 3,809 votes.

2024 Odisha Vidhan Sabha Election, Cuttack Sadar
Party	Candidate	Votes	%	±%
BJP	Prakash Chandra Sethi	79,542	48.49	
BJD	Chandra Sarathi Behera	75,733	46.17	
INC	Rama Chandra Gochhayat	7,010	4.27	
NOTA	None of the above	1,071	0.65	0
Majority		3,809	2.32	
Turnout		1,64,034	71.63	
BJP gain from BJD				

=== 2019 ===
In 2019 election, Biju Janata Dal candidate Chandra Sarathi Behera defeated Bharatiya Janata Party candidate Dilip Kumar Mallick by a margin of 26,126 votes.

2019 Vidhan Sabha Election, Cuttack Sadar
Party	Candidate	Votes	%	±%
BJD	Chandra Sarathi Behera	86,254	55.41	
BJP	Dilip Kumar Mallick	60,128	38.67	
INC	Abhishek Mahananda	6,214	4	
NOTA	None of the above	1,148	0.74	
Majority		25,791	16.74	
Turnout		1,55,799	70.54	
BJD hold				

=== 2014 ===
In 2014 election, Biju Janata Dal candidate Chandra Sarathi Behera defeated Bharatiya Janata Party candidate Dilip Kumar Mallick by a margin of 25,791 votes.

2014 Vidhan Sabha Election, Cuttack Sadar
Party	Candidate	Votes	%	±%
BJD	Chandra Sarathi Behera	71,247	50.94	−
BJP	Dilip Kumar Mallick	45456	32.5	−
INC	Chandra Skhar Samal	18271	13.06	−
NOTA	None of the above	956	0.68	−
Majority		26126	18.44	
Turnout		139856	70.48	
Registered electors		1,96,720		
BJD hold				

=== 2009 ===
In 2009 election, Biju Janata Dal candidate Kalindi Behera defeated Indian National Congress candidate Ashima Mahananda by a margin of 49,344 votes.

2009 Vidhan Sabha Election, Cuttack Sadar
Party	Candidate	Votes	%	±%
BJD	Kalindi Behera	71,631	63.78	−
INC	Ashima Mahananda	22,287	19.84	−
BJP	Dilip Kumar Mallick	15,407	13.72	−
Majority		49,344	43.94 (Note: %of total valid votes)	−
Turnout		1,12,308	61.36	−
Registered electors		1,83,017		
BJD gain from Independent		Swing	▼5.93 (Note: 2004 Voter turnout was 67.29%)	
