= Singra =

- municipality
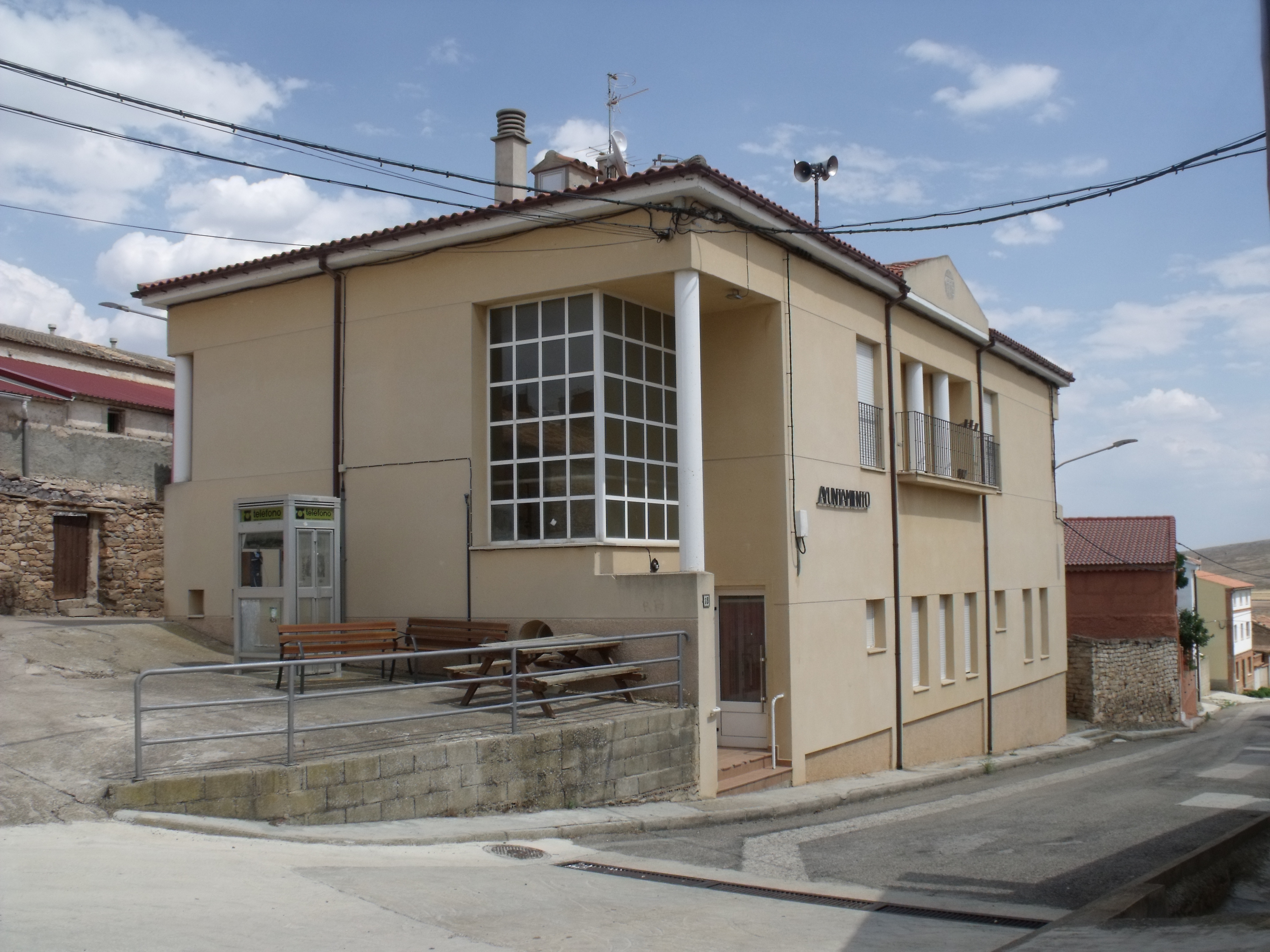
- Town hall

- Flag Coat of arms

- Location within Spain
- Coordinates: 40°39′N 1°18′W
- Country: Spain
- Autonomous community: Aragon
- Province: Teruel
- Comarca: Jiloca

Area
  - Total: 36 km^{2} (14 sq mi)

Population (2025-01-01)
  - Total: 76
  - Density: 2.1/km^{2} (5.5/sq mi)
- Time zone: UTC+1 (CET)
  - Summer (DST): UTC+2 (CEST)

Singra is a municipality located in the province of Teruel, Aragon, Spain. According to the 2004 census (INE), the municipality has a population of 94 inhabitants.

== See also ==
- List of municipalities in Teruel
