= Sayeed Mohammed =

Indian Odia educationist, freedom fighter and philanthropist

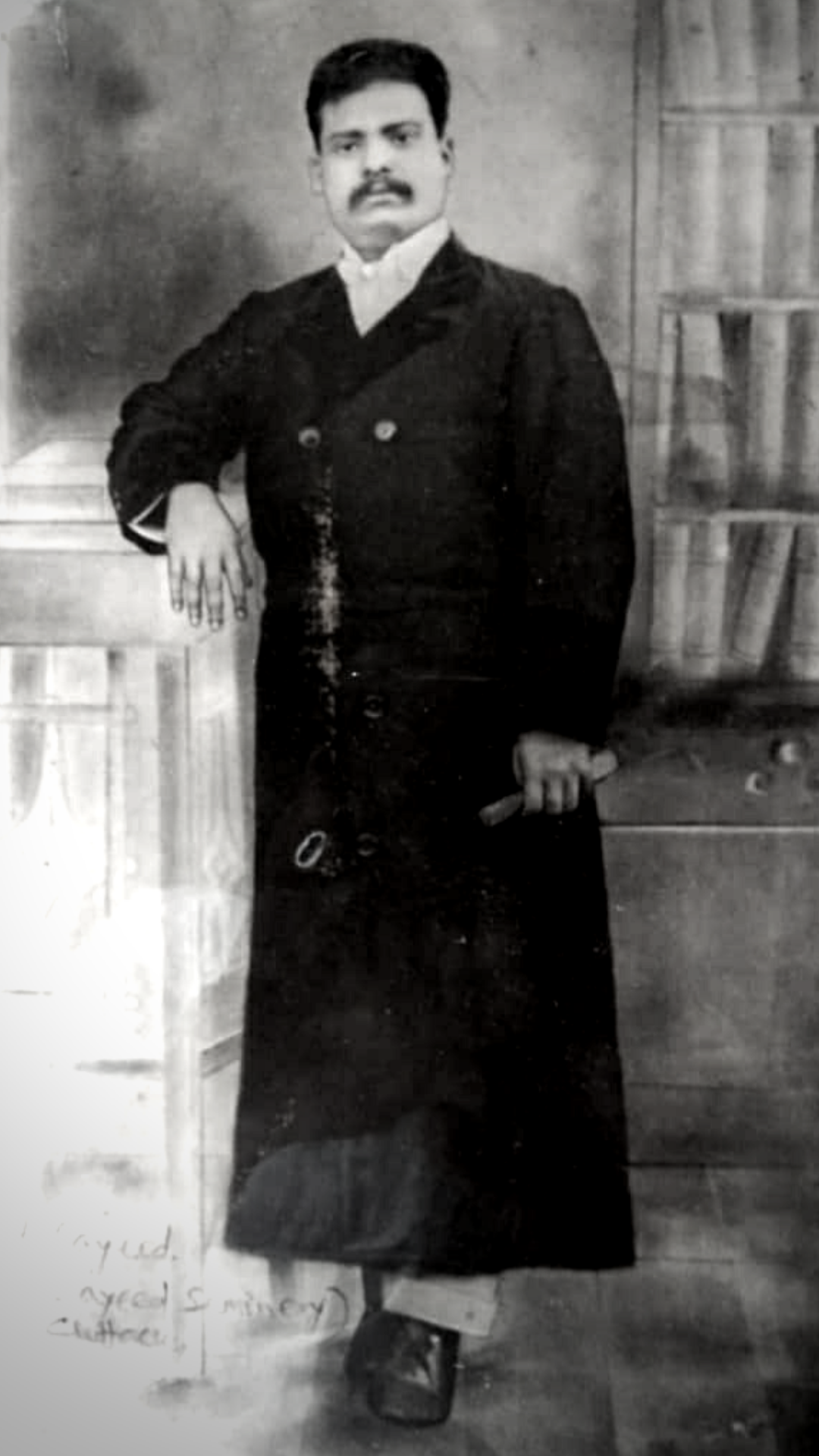
- Born: 25 August 1891; Madhigarh, Dhenkanal State, British India
- Died: 18 July 1922 (aged 30); Cuttack, Bihar and Orissa, British India
- Resting place: Qadam e Rasool, Cuttack
- Citizenship: British Raj
- Education: Ravenshaw Collegiate School, Calcutta Madrasa, Calcutta University
- Occupation: Educationist
- Spouse: Begum Badar un nissa Akhtar
- Children: Athar-ul Amin, Afzal-ul Amin, Fazal-ul Amin, Shamsunnihar Akhtar, Husnara Begum
- Parent(s): Atharuddin Mohammed (father); Nadeera Sultana (mother)
- Relatives: Hussain Rabi Gandhi (grandson in law); Sultana Farhat Amin (granddaughter)

Sayeed Mohammed (25 August 1891 – 18 July 1922) was an Indian Odia educationist, freedom fighter and philanthropist. In 1913, he founded the Moslem Seminary (present day: Sayeed Seminary) at Cuttack, which is regarded as the second nationalist school of Odisha. Sayeed is known for his activism against the British in the early 1900s. He was one of the prominent members of the Utkal Sammilani. In 1922, Sayeed along with Ekram Rasul co-founded the All Odisha Khilafat Committee, in the wake of the non-cooperation movement in India.

== Early life and education ==
Janab Maulana Sayeed Mohammed was born in Madhigarh, into the Dewan family of Dhenkanal, to Atharuddin Mohammad Athar and his first wife (Badi Bahu Begum), Begum Nadeera Sultana. Sayeed's father was the ruling chief of Kamakhyangar and also the Diwan of the Princely State of Dhenkanal during Raja Shura Paratap Mahendra Bahadur's rule. Sayeed's maternal uncle, Imaan ul Haque practiced as a lawyer at Cuttack court and was a colleague of Subhash Chandra Bose's father, Janakinath Bose.

Sayeed moved to Cuttack in order to attain formal education. He finished his matriculation from Ravenshaw Collegiate School and was in the same batch as Radhanath Rath. Sayeed then joined the Utkal Sammilani. Both he and his father made attempts to unify the Odia speaking tracts by working for the Sammilani. In Cuttack, Sayeed emerged as a local leader and started to serve the Odia community. He led the Odia muslims to participate in the Indian freedom struggle.

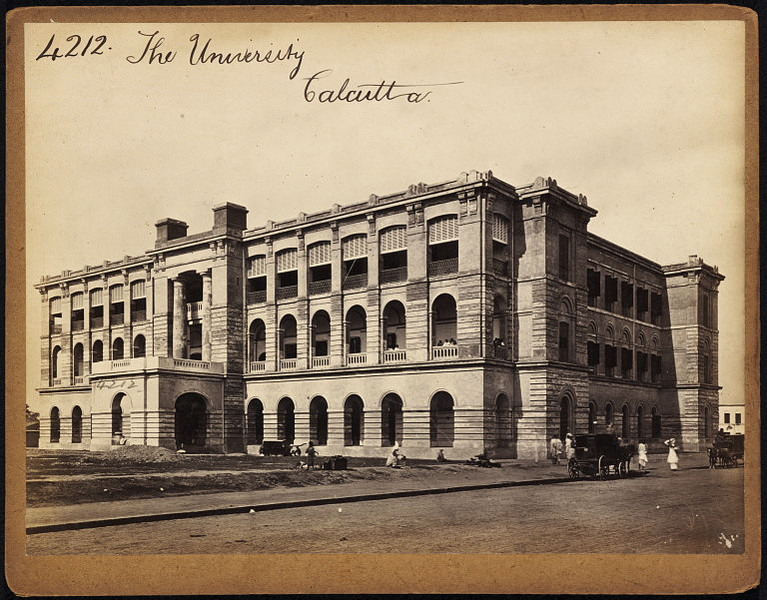
The University of Calcutta in the late nineteenth century, by Francis Frith

Later, Sayeed earned a scholarship from Calcutta Madrasa and did his F.A. there, after which he qualified the entrance examination and joined the Calcutta University. He graduated with honours in Persian studies, Philosophy and Arabic subjects in 1908, obtaining a first class in his special subjects and standing the first of his year. He was the first muslim from Orissa province to become a graduate. Sayeed was then appointed as an assistant head master at Victoria high school, Cuttack by the British government. Being a nationalist, he also worked in close association with Gopabandhu Das, Madhusudan Das, Bhakta kabi Madhusudan Rao and Radhanath Rath, the editor of Samaja.

== Career and activism ==
In October 1908, Sayeed organized and led various mass protests against the British government regarding the new provision introduced by the British, which provided limited and separate reservation of seats for Muslim and Hindu students in schools at the time of admission. Because of his participation in the nationalist movements against the British government, he along with some of his other Indian colleagues at Victoria high school, who were nationalists too, were asked to resign from their respective positions. It was during this period when Gopabandhu Das established the first nationalist school in Odisha called the Satyabadi Bana Bidyalaya at Sakhigopal, Puri in 1909.

Sayeed saw this as an excellent idea to educate and uplift Indian children without actually serving or working under the British and thus, to cultivate the ideals of nationalism in the hearts of Indian students; he established a new nationalist school called the 'Muslim Seminary' in 1913 at Cuttack for Indian students..

In 1918, Orissa was struck by one of the most devastating crises in its history, a severe meteorological drought that crippled agriculture, triggered widespread food shortages, and left vast sections of the population starving. The calamity deepened as the 1918 influenza pandemic swept across India, turning famine into a full-blown humanitarian disaster. Malnutrition and hunger made people acutely vulnerable to the virus, while the disease itself spread rapidly through weakened, overcrowded communities. The combined impact of famine and influenza created a mutually reinforcing tragedy, leading to staggering mortality rates, particularly among the poor and marginalized.

Amid this turmoil, Sayeed emerged as a strong voice of resistance. Outraged by the colonial administration’s indifference, he went against Sir Edward Vere Levinge, the then Lieutenant Governor of the Bihar and Orissa Province, holding him accountable for the government’s failure to provide timely relief. He mobilized local communities, appealed for relief measures, and brought attention to the suffering of the people through petitions and public statements.

On 23 March 1921, he received Gandhiji at Qadam e Rasul, Cuttack and hosted the meeting along with Ekram Rasul in which Gandhiji had addressed the people of Cuttack. Sayeed contributed generously to the Tilak Swaraj Fund as per Gandhiji's appeal. In the wake of the non-cooperation movement, Sayeed organized various melas to unite the Hindus and Muslims of the city against the British and had called for a complete boycott of foreign goods. In order to support the ongoing Swadeshi movement, he had made it mandatory for everyone in his school to wear clothes only made of Khadi. Sayeed himself wore clothes made of Khadi to set an example. He co-founded the All Odisha Khilafat Committee in 1922 before his death.

== Marriage and family ==
Sayeed married Begum Badar un nissa Akhtar, the only daughter of Aminuddin Al Amin Suhrawardy and the granddaughter of Ubaidullah Al Ubaidi Suhrawardy. The couple bore five children (three sons and two daughters). After Sayeed's untimely death in 1922, Begum Badr continued to work for the Muslim community in Cuttack. She particularly emphasized on female education.

== Sayeed Seminary ==
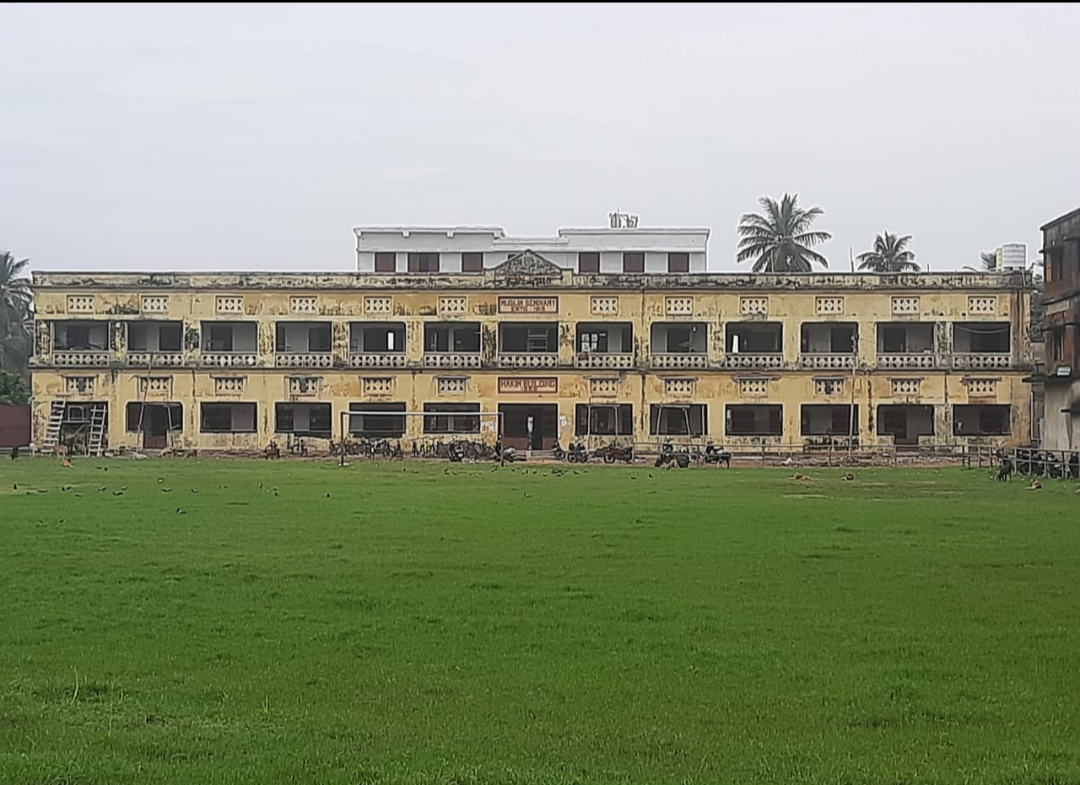
Sayeed Seminary High School in 2019

The school formally opened on Friday, 8 August 1913 with 500 students on its roll in a rented building. It was largely dependent on donations. Meanwhile, Sayeed managed to persuade a generous merchant of Madras, C. Abdul Hakeem to donate the present land and building. Even the Nizam of Hyderabad, Mir Osman Ali Khan agreed to make a monthly grant of Rs 50. A managing committee was formed by Sayeed in 1913 and Maulavi Golam Mohammad, Mohammad Kasim Ahmad Quazi, Kameeruddin Khan, Alla Bira, Mahammad Sayeed Abdus Sakur, Babu Akshay Chandra Ray, Satyabrata Patnaik and Devendranath Ray were appointed as its members. The school strongly promoted the ideas of nationalism among its students; Sayeed had made it mandatory for all the teachers and students of the school to wear clothes made of Khadi in order to support the ongoing Swadeshi movement. He himself wore clothes only made of Khadi to set an example till his death.

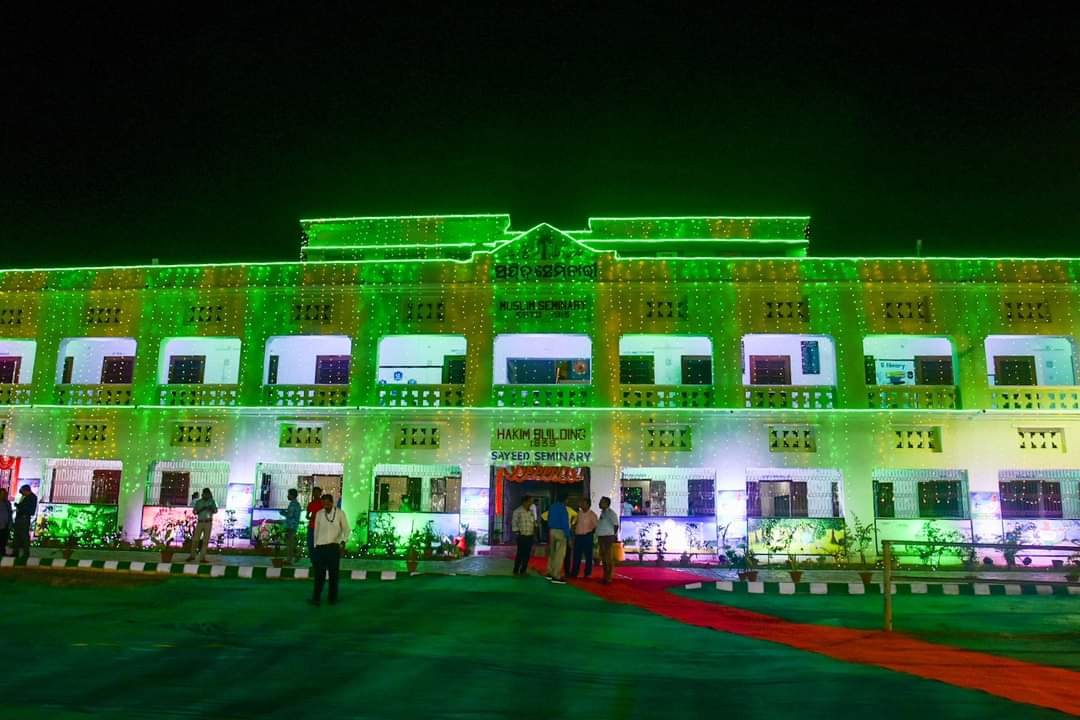
Sayeed Seminary High School in 2022

After Sayeed's death, Moulavi Golam Mohammad was appointed as its President and Akshay Chandra Ray, its Vice President. The efforts made by Sayeed Mohammed was acknowledged and appreciated by the Secretary to Government of Bihar and Orissa Province, Ministry of Education and such appreciation was notified and published in the Official Gazette dated 1 December 1932.

After the partition of 1947, its name was changed from 'Muslim Seminary' to 'Sayeed Seminary' in the memory of its late founder, to throw a more secular light at the institution. Sayeed Seminary was recognised as a High School from 1 June 1945 as revealed in the Orissa Gazette No.30 dated 3.8.1945. The school came into the direct payment system from 1974 for teaching staff and from 1977 for the non-teaching staff.

Sayeed Seminary became a reputed high school in the city, that offered education to both Muslim and Hindu students in Urdu and Odia. The school has produced many distinguished alumni including, Mohammad Mohsin, Sushil Kumar Sinha (scientist), Abdul Majid (sportsperson), S.M. Osatullah (I.A.S) and Mustafiz Ahmed (Minister).
