= Zahir Shah Mirza =

Moghul Prince (c. 1855–1899)

Mirza Zahir Shah
- Prince of Timurid–Mughal Dynasty

Zamindar of Singranatore
- Lordship: 1870s – 1899
- Predecessor: Established the landlord systems
- Successor: Mirza Zafar
- Born: Mirza Muhammad Zahir Shah c. 1855; Allahabad (Present Day India)
- Died: c. 1899 (aged 43–44); Singranatore; Bengal Presidency; British Raj (present day Bangladesh)
- Issue: Mirza Zafar; Umdatunnissa, Nawab Begum of Kharui
Names
- Mirza Muhammad Zahiruddin Shah bin Mirza Muhammad Jalal Shah bin Mirza Muhammad Jahan Shah Bahadur bin Sultan Ibn Sultan Sahib al-Mufazi Wali Ni'mat Haqiqi Khudavand Mujazi Abu Nasir Mu'in al-Din Muhammad Mirza Akbar Shah Pad-Shah Ghazi
- Parents House Founding House: Mughal House of Singranatore
- Dynasty: Timurid Dynasty
- Father: Mirza Jalal Shah
- Religion: Sunni Islam (Hanafi)

Mirza Mu'hammad Zahir ud-Din Shah (c. 1855–1899) known as Mirza Zahir Shah (Persian-ظهیرالدّین میرزا محمد) was a Mughal Prince through the Nineteenth Mughal Emperor Akbar II lineage descendant who was the Great-Grandfather of Mirza Zahir Shah and an Indian Zamindar in the erstwhile British Empire who was the first Zamindar of Natore and Patriarch founder of the House of Singra and Natore. He was the son of Prince Mirza Jalal Shah, who was the son of the ruler of Assam, Prince Mirza Jahan Shah, who was the son of Emperor Akbar II (r. 1806–1837).

== Ancestry ==
Ancestors of Mirza Zahir Shah

256. Aurangzeb Alamgir I; (1618 – 1707)
128. Bahadur Shah I; (1643 – 1712)
64. Jahandar Shah; (1661 – 1713)
32. Alamgir II; (1699 – 1759)
16. Shah Alam II; (1728 – 1806)
8. Akbar II; (1760 – 1837)
4. Mirza Jahan Shah; (1779 – 1846)
2. Mirza Jalaluddin Shah; ( ? – ? )
1. Mirza Zahiruddin Shah; (1855 – 1899)

== Background & Early life's ==
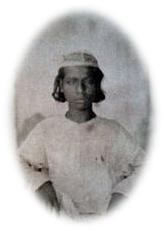
Uncle Muhammad Mirza Abbas Shah (1845-1910) at the Imperial palace

Born in about 1855 as the oldest son of Mirza Jalal Shah, a political pensioner, in Allahabad, after the events of 1857. He was a grandson of Mirza Jahan Shah (1779–1846) and was named after an ancestor, Mirza Zahiruddin Muhammad Babur, the first Mughal Emperor (1483–1530). Many members of the formerly ruling families were exiled eastwards towards Bengal, such as the family of Tipu Sultan and Wajid Ali Shah, the rulers of Mysore and Awadh. The Delhi Imperial family was exiled eastward to Burma. Calcutta in Bengal became the capital of the Indian Empire in 1858, himself reaching there before 1868 and serving the Maharajas of Natore in Natore.

== Biography ==
He was given land grants by the British administrators as a lord (Zamindar) of the villages in East Bengal and served as the "Mridha" or the Minister to the Maharaja of Rajshahi under whom he was subinfeudated. With the decline of the Natore Zamindari, he received areas and villages formerly under the Hindu ruling family.

=== Death and legacy ===
In the early 1870s, in neighboring estates in Natore, he provided support to the local governors and zamindars in crushing the Pabna revolts by the peasantry. In Pabna, he was a patron and participant in the Chalanbeel Horse Races. After his death in 1899, the estates of the family were expanded by his son and grandsons to become one of the few Muslim zamindars in the area. After the abolition of the lord-peasant system in 1950, members of the family held important positions in regional politics and local governance.

His son, Mirza Zafar, succeeded him as the Zamindar. His office of the Mridha went to younger sons who dominated politics in Rajshahi and Natore well into the twenty-first century, such as Ibrahim Ali Mridha and others.

== Sources ==
- Chowdhury, S. R. Kumar; P. K., Singh; Ismail, M. Ali (2012). Blood Dynasties: Zemindaris of Bengal - A Chronicle of Bengal's Ruling families (Paperback). Dictus: Politics and Democracy series. ISBN 9783847385080.
