= Athar Mohammed =

Dewan of Dhenkanal

Sri Dewan Sahib Khan Bahadur Dewan Bahadur Athar Mohammed
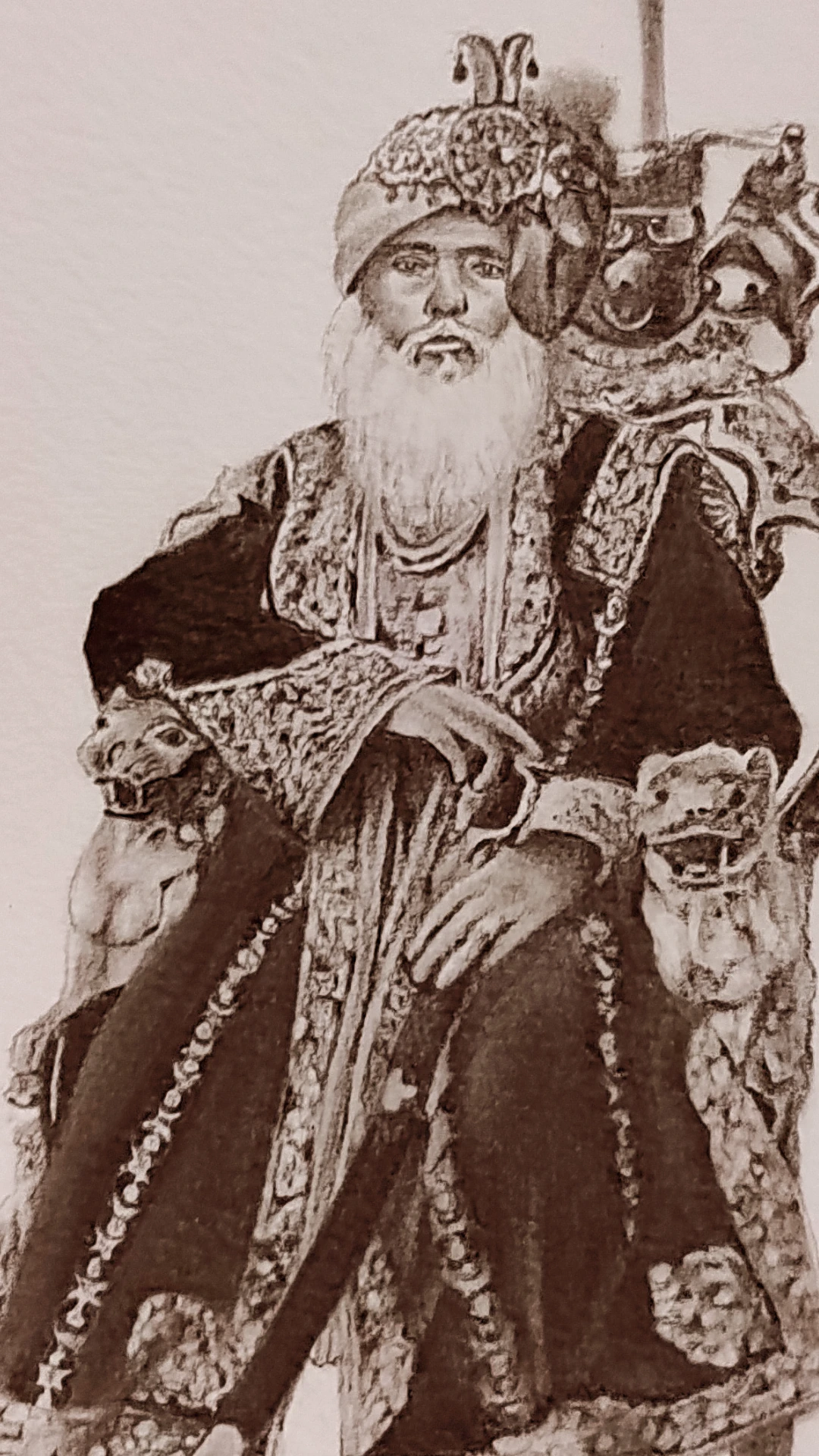
- Atharuddin Mohammed PM of Dhenkanal State (1877) by G. Triveni

Prime Minister of Dhenkanal State
- In office 1877 – c. 1899

Samanta of Madhi garh (Kamakhyanagar)
- In office 1868 – c. 1899

Personal details
- Born: 1859 A.D. Madhi garh, Dhenkanal State
- Died: 21 April 1931 Cuttack, British India
- Spouse(s): Begum Nadeera Sultana, Shahbano Begum, Ruqqaiya Begum, Ulfat Bibi
- Children: Sayeed Mohammed, Malik Mohammed, Akhir Mohammed, Shaukat Begum, Rafique Mohammed; Maatpur Begum Bilqis, Birjis Begum
- Parents: Khwaja Pir Fazal Mohammed (father); Dilshaad Ara Begum (mother)

Military service
- Rank: Prime Minister

Atharuddin Mohammed Athar also known as Athar Mohammed was an Odia military officer, feudatory chief (Samanta) of Madhi (present day : Kamakhyanagar) and the Dewan of the princely state of Dhenkanal during Raja Dinabandhu Mahendra Bahadur (1877 – 1885) and Raja Shura Pratap Mahendra Bahadur's rule. He was one among the first princely officials to join the Odia unification movement and the Utkal Sabha.

== Early life ==
Atharuddin Mohammed was born as the eldest son of Khwaja Pir Fazal Mohammed, a notable Persian philosopher and mystic of the Ni'matullāhī order who later joined the service of Raja Bhagiratha Mahendra, the Raja of Denkanal. Fazal Mohammed was appointed as the Samanta of Madhi garh presently known as Kamakhyanagar and after his death, his son Atharuddin took over the position. Athar rose to prominence in the eyes of the king by displaying his bravery and wit. He was appointed as the Dewan of the newly crowned king, Raja Dinabandhu Mahendra by the British in 1877. During his tenure Atharuddin organised the last elephant fair in Odisha.

== Prajamandal movement ==
With the beginning of the Praja Mandal movement in Dhenkanal State, the peasants all over the kingdom started revolting against the repressive policies adopted by the new king, Raja Shura Pratap Bahadur. Atharuddin tried to pacify the situation by signing a temporary truce with the revolters. However, it did not last long. Inspired by the nationalists, he sent his son Sayeed Mohammed to Cuttack to attain formal education. Later in 1899, Atharuddin moved to Cuttack and joined the Utkal Sabha. He along with Madhusudan Das, Rev Shem Sahu, John Samson Rout, Bhagaban Chandra Das, Ramesh Chandra Mandal, and Gauri Shankar Ray attended the Congress sessions held at different places and took keen interest in the activities of the Congress in its early years. Atharuddin acted as a pioneer in bringing the message of Congress and its liberal ideas to Coastal Odisha in the last two decades against the British authorities. He attended the Congress session of Calcutta held in 1911 under the presidency of Bishan Narayan Dar.

He built the Fazal Mohammed Masjid (present-day Choti Masjid) in the memory of his deceased father near his residence at Dargaah Bazaar. In the early 1930s, nearly half of his estate was confiscated by the British for building jails in Cuttack.
