= Qadam e Rasool, Cuttack =

Islamic shrine in Odisha, India

Qadam e Rasool
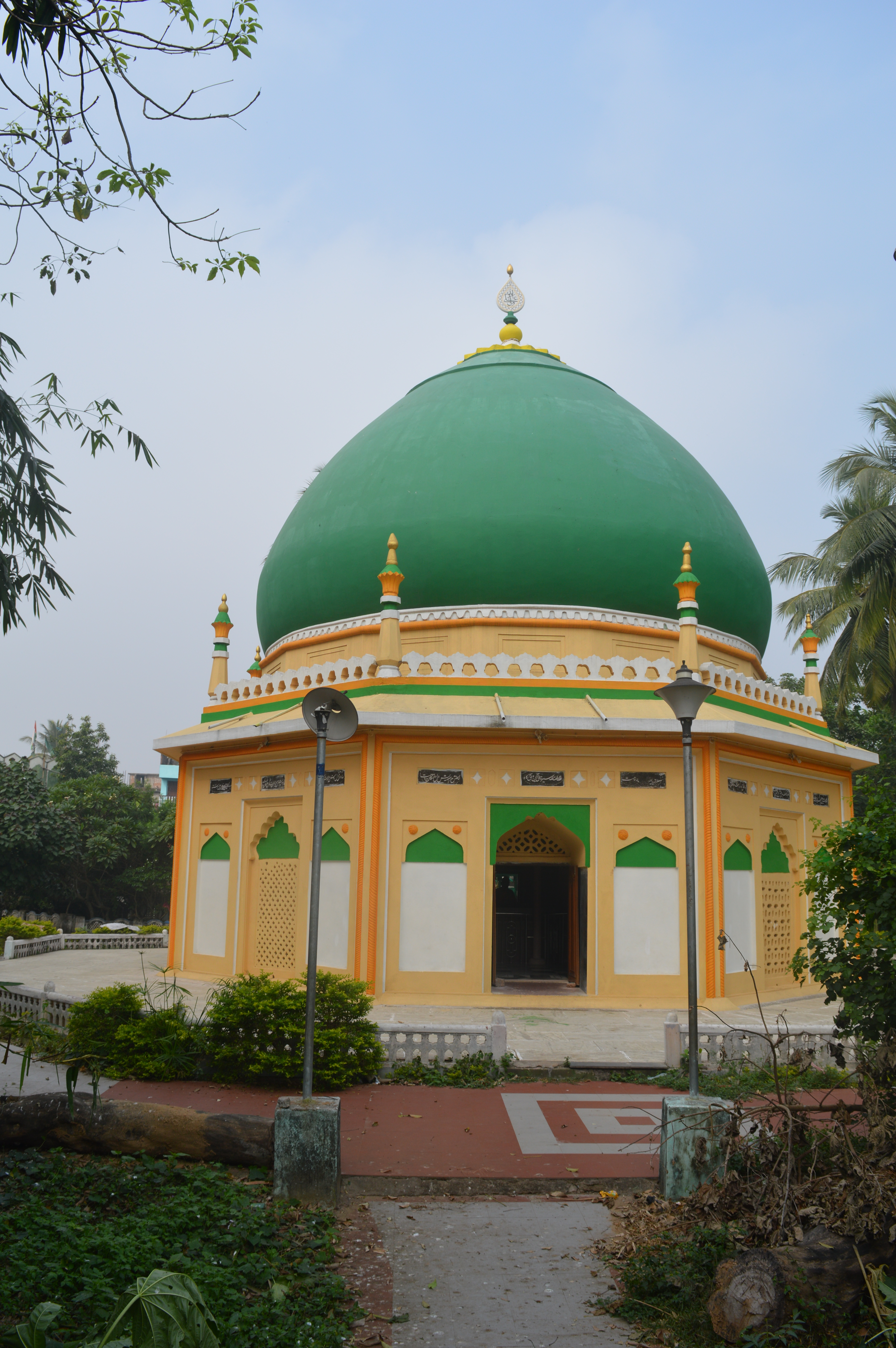
- Main dome of Qadam e Rasool

Religion
- Affiliation: Islam
- District: Cuttack
- Ecclesiastical or organizational status: Dargah

Location
- Location: Dargaah Bazaar, Cuttack, Odisha
- Country: India
- Interactive map of Qadam e Rasool
- Coordinates: 20°29′4.67″N 85°51′51.93″E

Architecture
- Type: Dargah
- Style: Mughal architecture
- Established: 18th century
- Direction of façade: West

Qadam e Rasool (foot-print of Mohammed), situated at Cuttack, is a shrine and an important specimen of Mughal architecture in Odisha. In the Qadam Rasool premises are present numerous dargahs, two masjids, namely Moti Masjid and Qadam e Rasool Masjid and several inscriptions.

Researcher Mohammed Yamin said: "Architecturally, it is a beautiful shrine of the Mughal era, but with an Odia style of temple building. Hence, it is a fusion of Hindu-Muslim architecture in Odisha."

== Graveyard ==
Inside the shrine, there is a big graveyard in which many notable personalities including Shaheed Pani, Atharuddin Mohammed, Mohammad Mohsin, Muhammad Taqi Khan, Sayeed Mohammed, Begum Badar un nissa Akhtar, Afzal-ul Amin, Sikandar Alam, Dr. Hussain Rabi Gandhi are buried. The shrine also has several Persian inscriptions.
