= Chandra Sarathi Behera =

Indian politician

Member of Odisha Legislative Assembly
- In office 2009–2014
- Preceded by: Kalindi Behera
- Constituency: Salipur
- In office 2024–2014
- Constituency: Cuttack Sadar

Personal details
- Party: Biju Janata Dal
- Profession: Politician

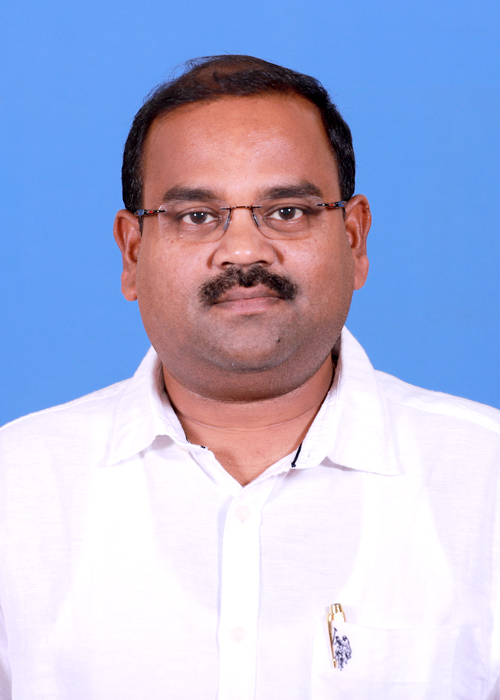
Chandra Sarathi Behera,Politician from Odisha

Chandra Sarathi Behera is an Indian politician from Odisha who was elected three times to the Odisha Legislative Assembly in 2009, representing the Salipur Assembly constituency, and in 2014 and 2019, representing the Cuttack Sadar Assembly constituency, as a member of the Biju Janata Dal.

== See also ==
- 2019 Odisha Legislative Assembly election
- Odisha Legislative Assembly
