= Radhanath Rath =

Indian politician

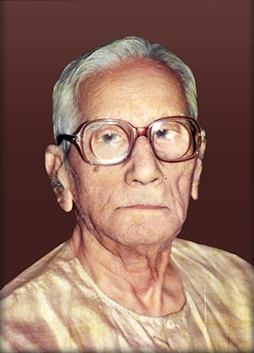

Minister of Development
- In office 6 Apr 1957 – 25 Feb 1961

Minister of Finance and Education
- In office 7 Apr 1952 – 19 Oct 1956

Member: 5th and 6th Odisha Legislative Assembly
- In office 1971–1977
- Constituency: Athagarh

Member: PI2, 1st and 2nd Odisha Legislative Assembly
- In office 1946–1961
- Constituency: Athagarh

Personal details
- Born: 6 December 1896 Radhanathpur Shashan, Athagarh
- Died: 11 February 1998 (aged 101) Cuttack, Odisha
- Resting place: Satyabadi, Puri
- Party: Indian National Congress
- Spouse: Savitri Rath
- Children: Dr.Neelakantha Rath, Shanti lata, Manorama, Ramesh Ch Rath
- Education: Matriculation
- Alma mater: Ravenshaw Collegiate School
- Profession: Writer, politician

Dr. Radhanath Rath (6 December 1896 – 11 February 1998) was a newspaper editor, freedom fighter, social worker and politician from Odisha. He was the editor of The Samaja, one of the leading newspapers of Odisha.

== Early life ==
He was born on 6 December 1896, in a village named "Radhanathpur Shashan" of Athgarh. He started his education in the Jubilee School of Balasore where his uncle Lokanath Mohapatra was the Sanskrit teacher. He was matriculated in 1916 from Ravenshaw Collegiate School of Cuttack.

He joined the forest department of Singhbhum district as a Clerk. He left the job in 1919 and joined the 'Satyabadi press' of Gopabandhu Das. He started his career in Journalism as Manager and Assistant Editor of the Oriya weekly "The Samaja" which was started under the editorial of Gopabandhu Das. After the death of Gopabandhu Das in the year 1928, Pandit Lingaraj Mishra worked as the editor of the "Samaj". In the year 1930, the daily publication of Samaj was initiated. During 1946–1952 Lingaraj Mishra worked as the education minister of Odisha. So Radhanath Rath became the Editor of the "Samaj".

He joined the Quit India Movement in 1942 and was imprisoned for two years.

== Political activities ==
He was elected 5 times to the Odisha Legislative Assembly. In 1946, he was first elected to the state assembly from Athagarh. He appointed cabinet Minister in charge of Finance, Education, Forestry and Agriculture from 1952 to 1961. Radhanath Rath became the Finance and Education Minister in the Nabakrushna Choudhury Cabinet for the period 1952 to 1959. In the year 1959 he held the post of minister of development & forest department under the Harekrushna Mahatab's Cabinet. Except for between 1961 and 1967, he remained a member of the house from 1946 to 1977.

== Social work ==
He was a lifetime member and President of the Odisha branch of the 'Servants of the People Society' set up by Lala Lajpat Rai of Punjab. He was president of the Society for over a decade from May 1981. He was the head of the All Indian Scout and Guides Association, Odisha. He was also related to many other organisations like the Hind leprosy eradication group, the Gopabandhu Daridra Narayan Seva Sangha. He was also the Deputy Dean of the Orissa University of Agriculture and Technology. He has written many poems, stories and biographies. "Mo Jel Smruti Lipi" is one of his famous works. He died on 11 February 1998 at Cuttack, and was buried with full state honours at Satyabadi near Puri.

== Awards ==
- Orissa Sahitya Academy Award, 1991
- Padma Bhusan, 1968
- Critic Circle of India award, 1987
- All India Anubrata award in 1988
- Utkal Ratna Samman (1993, Utkal Sahitya Samaj)
- Degree of Doctor of Laws (LL.D) (by the Berhampur University), 1976.
