= Kumarendra Mallick =

Indian geophysicist and poet

- Born: 21 December 1941 (age 84); Odisha, India
- Education: IIT Kharagpur
- Known for: Studies on the analysis of geoelectromagnetic data
- Awards: 1986 Shanti Swarup Bhatnagar Prize
- Scientific career
- Fields: Geophysics
- Workplaces: National Geophysical Research Institute; University of Naples; University of Karlsruhe; IIT Mumbai

Kumarendra Mallick (born 1941) is an Indian geophysicist, poet and a former emeritus scientist at the National Geophysical Research Institute, Hyderabad, A former assistant professor of the Indian Institute of Technology, Mumbai, he served as a director-grade scientist at NGRI. He is the author of three books on geophysics, a poem anthology, Letter to an Imaginary Pen-Friend and several articles.

== Biography and career ==
Mallick, an alumnus of the Indian Institute of Technology, Kharagpur, has served as a visiting professor at University of Naples and as a visiting scientist at University of Karlsruhe. He is reported to have done extensive research on the analysis of geoelectromagnetic data and contributed to the development of interpretational aids. The Council of Scientific and Industrial Research (CSIR), the apex agency of the Government of India for scientific research, awarded him the Shanti Swarup Bhatnagar Prize for Science and Technology, one of the highest Indian science awards for his contributions to Earth, Atmosphere, Ocean and Planetary Sciences in 1986. (Note: Long link - please select award year to see details)
