= Syed Hossain =

Indian journalist and activist (1888–1949)

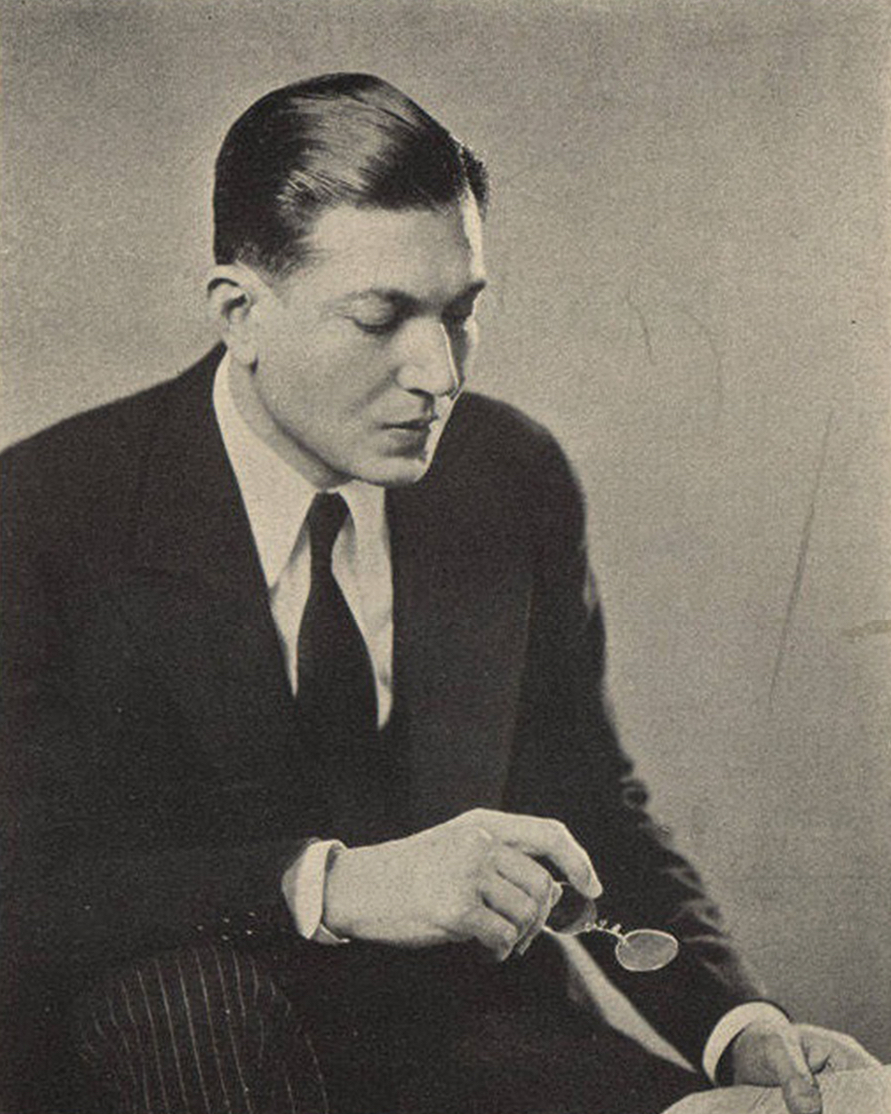
- Born: 23 June 1888; Dhaka, Bengal Presidency, British India (present-day Bangladesh)
- Died: 26 February 1949 (aged 61); Cairo, Egypt
- Burial place: Cairo
- Relatives: Nawab Syed Muhammad Azad (father); Nawab Abdul Latif (maternal grandfather); Sher-e-Bangla A. K. Fazlul Huq (brother-in-law); Sir Hassan Suhrawardy (brother-in-law); Shaista Suhrawardy Ikramullah (niece)

Syed Hossain (also Syud Hossain; 23 June 1888 – 26 February 1949) was an Indian journalist, an Indian independence activist, and the first Indian ambassador to Egypt in the Jawaharlal Nehru administration.

== Early life ==
Syed Hossain was born in Dhaka in 1888. His father, Nawab Syed Mohammad Azad Khan Bahadur (1850-1916) was the Inspector-General of Registration, Bengal. His great-great-grandfather was Mir Syed Ashraf Ali Khan (d. 1829). Syed Hossain's mother was the daughter of Nawab Abdul Latif, a social reformer of Bengal. Sher-e-Bangla A. K. Fazlul Huq (1873–1962) and Sir Hassan Suhrawardy (1888–1946), were his brother-in-laws.

Hossain passed his Entrance Examination in 1904 and F.A. in 1906 from the Muhammadan Anglo-Oriental College of Aligarh. He then joined the Bengal Civil Service as a Sub-Deputy Collector in Calcutta but he soon went to England to pursue further education in 1909.

== Career ==
Hossain started his journalism career early in life and became the editor of Motilal Nehru's nationalist newspaper, The Independent.

Hossain wrote "Echoes from Old Dacca", published in May 1909 and "Gandhi: The Saint as Statesman" in 1937.

Hossain represented India at the Paris Peace Conference in 1920 for the Near Eastern Peace settlement.

In the 1930s, he moved to California. He served as a lecturer at the University of Southern California's Department of History as a visiting faculty lecturer. He taught two courses entitled "India's Civilization" and "Islamic Civilization" in the summer of 1934. The university later conferred on him an honorary doctorate degree.

When Hossain left the United States for India in 1946, a farewell dinner was organized for him at the Ceylon India Inn in New York City where the guests included Ragini Devi, Habib Rahman, and Indrani Rahman.

== Personal life ==
Hossain was in a brief relationship with Vijaya Lakshmi Pandit, sister of Nehru, though this was opposed by her family. Pandit later wrote in her autobiography, The Scope of Happiness, "...while still in my teens, I had become attached to a young man, Syed Hossain (sic), whom my father had appointed editor of a newspaper he had just started, The Independent. In an era that proclaimed Hindu-Muslim unity, and belonging to a family that had close Muslim friends, I must have thought it would be perfectly natural to marry outside my religion. But in matters such as marriage the times were deeply traditional, and I was persuaded that this would be wrong." Historian Manu Bhagavan states that Hossain and Pandit "definitely married", though notes the marriage may have been 'informal'.

He has been buried in Al-Arafa in Cairo. He was then one of the only Indians who was buried there. A state funeral was accorded to him by the Egyptian government. The road serving the tomb was later announced to be named after him.

== Works ==
- Gandhi, the Saint as Statesman (1936)

== See also ==
- Journalism in India
- Freedom fighters of India
