= Sukanya Rahman =

Indian dancer, visual artist and writer (born 1946)

Sukanya Rahaman
- Born: 1946 (age 79–80); Calcutta
- Education: École des Beaux-Arts
- Occupations: Indian classical dancer, choreographer, writer
- Spouse: Frank Wicks
- Children: Habib Wicks; Wardreath Wicks
- Parents: Habib Rahman (father); Indrani Rahman (mother)
- Relatives: Ragini Devi (grand mother); Ram Rahman (brother)

Sukanya Rahman (born 1946) is a classical Indian dancer, visual artist, and writer. Her book Dancing in the family, a memoir of three women has received several acclaims. Her painting and collage works are widely exhibited in India and abroad. Her works have been exhibited at the William Benton Museum of Art in Storr’s CT, The Arts Complex Museum in Duxbury, MA and The Fowler Museum, Los Angeles. She was featured in the book Voyages of Body and Soul: Selected Female Icons of India and Beyond.

== Biography ==
Sukanya Rahman was born in Calcutta in 1946. She is the daughter of Indian architect Habib Rahman and classical Indian dancer Indrani Rahman, the grand daughter of Indian dance pioneer, Ragini Devi and the sister of contemporary Indian photographer and curator Ram Rahman. She studied painting at the College of Art in New Delhi. In 1965 she received a French Government scholarship to study at the École Nationale des Beaux Arts in Paris. Rahman is married to theatre director, producer and playwright, Frank Wicks, best known for his Civil War play, Soldier Come Home. They have two sons, Habib Wicks and Wardreath Wicks and two grandchildren, Jake Wicks and Sarah Wicks.

== Dancing ==
Sukanya Rahman carries on the Indian dance tradition of her grandmother, Ragini Devi, and her mother, Indrani. She was trained at an early age by her mother. She then accepted a scholarship to study American modern dance with Martha Graham in New York before returning to Indian dance. Besides Indrani, her gurus have included Pandanallur Chokalingam Pillai, Tanjore Kittappa Pillai, Deba Prasad Das and Raja Reddy. She has toured internationally both in her solo program, performing the Kuchipudi, Orissi, and Bharata Natyam dance styles, and in joint concerts with Indrani. She has performed at the Jacob's Pillow Dance Festival, the Lincoln Center, the Asia Society, and the Edinburgh Festival. She is the winner of numerous dance Fellowships from the National Endowment for the Arts. Under a grant from the Maine Humanities Council, Sukanya toured her program "Feminine Images in the Myth, Art and Dance of India: 4,000 Years of Hindu Expression of the Woman." She has served on the NEA Dance Panel, Pew Charitable Trust National Council to Preserve American Dance, and as a Site Visit Consultant for the NEA. She was also selected to address the National Council on the Arts as a guest speaker. Her dance workshops include Barnard, The Juilliard School, Sarah Lawrence, Bates, Bowdoin colleges and as Master Teacher and panelist for the National Foundation for the Advancement in the Arts, Miami (NFAA), now known as the National YOUNGARTS Foundation.

== Exhibitions ==
Rahman's works have been exhibited in many galleries and Museums in India and abroad, including: Eye Movement: India International Centre Annexe Gallery November 2015, The Sahmat Collective: Art and Activism in India since 1989, The Fowler Museum, Los Angeles, April 2015; The United Art Fair 2013, New Delhi, 14 September 2013; Gun Point Cove Gallery, Orr’s Island, Maine, July 2012; Gallery Project, Ann Arbor, Michigan, August 2009; M.F Husain Gallery, Jamia Millia Islamia, New Delhi, India January 2009; Queens Museum of Art, Flushing, NY October 2008 William Benton Museum of Art, Storrs, CT, January 2004 (part of permanent collection); Vadehra Gallery, New Delhi, India January 2004; Rabindra Bhavan, New Delhi, India December 2003; The Advocate Gallery, Los Angeles, CA June 2003; Fisher Studio, Bard College, Annandale NY June 2003; Nancy Margolis Gallery, New York, NY March 1999; Gallery 678, New York, NY January 1997; Davidson & Daughters Gallery, Portland, ME April 1997;

== Critical acclaim ==
"With small scale works of mixed media on paper, Sukanya Rahman presents a playful and lyrical suite of works. Her mark-making is diverse, juxtaposing the expressionistic with the geometric, the calligraphic with the boldly reductive. Collage elements further complicate the mix, allowing for printed patterns and found pictures to add their voices. These works are full of movement yet always achieve a careful balance, while Rahman’s palette reflects her multiple influences living between India, the United States and Mexico" - Peter Nagy, Curator, UAF II

"Sukanya Rahman’s collages have much to recommend them… hers is an art of layering, of pulling together diverse sources, high and low, with no distinctions made" - Holland Cotter, The New York Times

"What is George Harrison doing at the battlefield of Kurukshetra? And isn’t that Dick Tracy frolicking with Gopis in the water? The Taliban and Burkha-clad women, Buster Keaton, and Mother India crushing British rulers under her feet are all there. Like colorful butterflies, these images and objects have been impaled in tiny boxes by artist Sukanya Rahman at Gallery 678" - Lavina Melwani, India Today International

"Aesthetically, Sukanya Rahman’s works are assured and sophisticated. They are emotional and humorous and build tension between the understandable and non-understandable between Eastern and Western cultural references. It adds up to a sparkling performance" - Phillip Isaacson, Maine Sunday Telegram
