= Susan Grant Lewin =

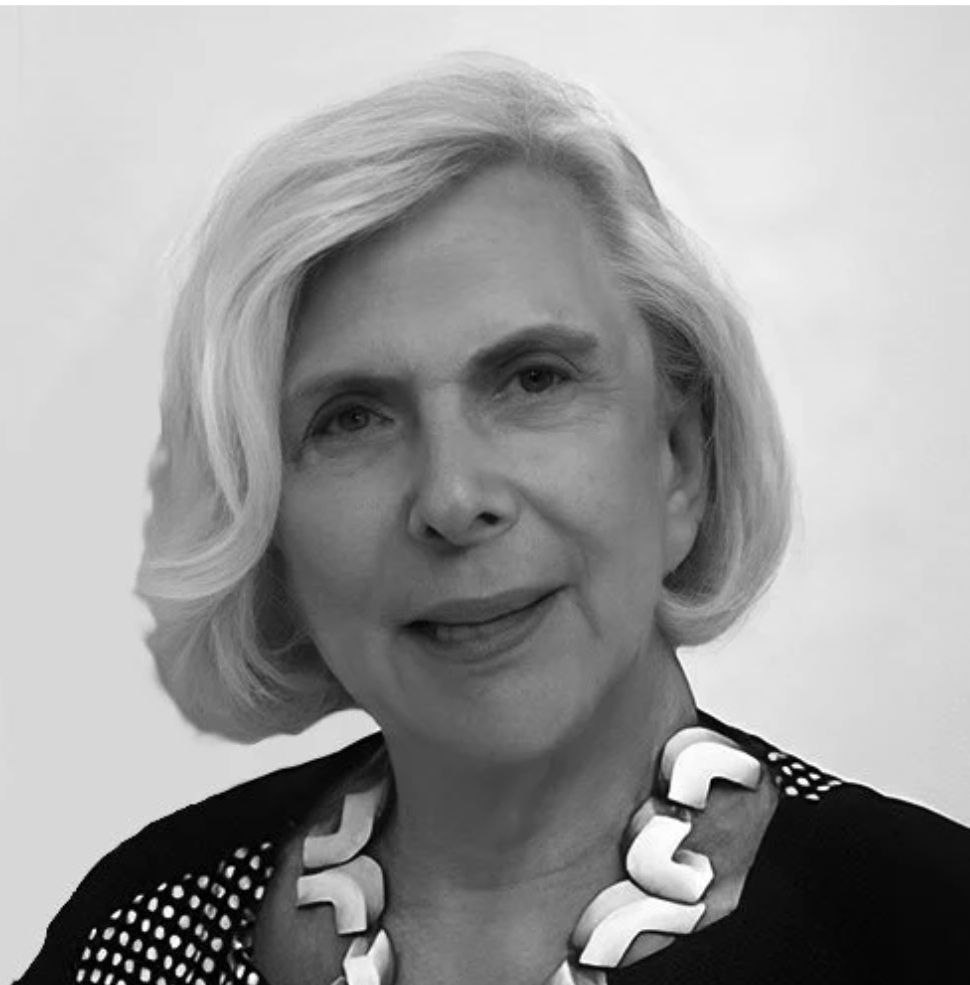
- Portrait of Susan Grant Lewin
- Born: Philadelphia, Pennsylvania, U.S.
- Citizenship: American
- Occupations: Collector, journalist, communications executive
- Known for: Contemporary art jewelry collection; architectural drawings
- Website: https://www.susangrantlewin.com/

Susan Grant Lewin is an American collector, journalist, communications executive, and advocate for contemporary design. She is best known for her influential collection of contemporary art jewelry and her collection of architectural drawings. Works from her collections have been exhibited internationally and donated to institutions including the Cooper Hewitt, Smithsonian Design Museum, the Yale University Art Gallery, the SCAD Museum of Art, and the Lowe Art Museum.

== Early life and education ==
Lewin was raised in Philadelphia, Pennsylvania. She has described her early exposure to design and architecture through family experiences and time spent visiting antique stores in the city. During a reporting trip to Copenhagen in the late 1960s, she encountered Scandinavian design and the jewelry of Vivianna Torun Bülow-Hübe, which sparked her interest in contemporary jewelry.

== Career in Journalism and Communications ==
Lewin began her professional career as a design journalist and later served as Senior Editor for Design and Architecture at House Beautiful. She also worked as a design editor for Home Furnishings Daily.

In 1996, Lewin founded Susan Grant Lewin Associates, a public relations firm specializing in design, art, and architecture. The firm has represented a range of prominent clients, including consumer products designer James Dyson, designer Philippe Starck for Duravit, and organizations associated with the Miami Design District. The agency also contributed to the launch of Design Miami in 2005 and collaborated with major cultural institutions and architectural firms, including those led by Steven Holl, Michael Graves, Charles Gwathmey, and Tom Kundig.

Lewin also served as global creative director for Formica Corporation, where she helped lead the promotion of the company's ColorCore laminate during the early 1980s. The ColorCore campaign is noted as a significant moment in the history of postmodern design, and Lewin organized a series of international exhibitions and programs that brought together architects, designers, and manufacturers. According to Yale University Art Gallery curator John Stuart Gordon, Lewin's work with ColorCore reflected "the diversity of her interests and how she tied them together," contributing to major design themes of the decade. Among the most prominent commissions was Frank Gehry's sculptural ColorCore fish, one of several projects documented in Lewin's book Formica & Design: From Countertop to High Art (Rizzoli).

== Jewelry Collecting and Philosophy ==
Lewin is recognized for her contribution to the visibility of American studio jewelry. She has emphasized a focus on conceptual and sculptural works rather than traditional precious materials, stating:

I sought out works that were not about wealth or sentiment: they were about ideas and concepts – art in jewellery format.

She has also described her view of jewelry as both intellectual and wearable art:

I believe that jewelry can decorate the mind in the same way it can decorate the body.

According to a Financial Times profile, Lewin seeks out contemporary jewelry that she believes should be “intellectually challenging and capable of decorating the mind as well as the body,” reflecting her belief that art jewelry transcends traditional notions of ornamentation.

Her collecting expanded while researching her book One of a Kind: American Art Jewelry Today (1994), which documented the evolution of American studio jewelry. Her gifts to the Cooper Hewitt alone exceed 250 works.

In her 2024 book A Collector’s Journey, Lewin outlines her approach to collecting contemporary art jewelry, emphasizing long-term relationships with artists and a focus on conceptual, sculptural, and materially experimental works. The book documents the evolution of her collection and reflects her view of jewelry as a form of artistic and intellectual expression rather than conventional adornment.

Commentary from Art Jewelry Forum underscores Lewin’s deep involvement in contemporary jewelry, including her longstanding relationships with artists, curators, and institutions active in the field.

Major exhibitions drawn from her collection include:

- 2017: Jewelry of Ideas (Cooper Hewitt, Smithsonian Design Museum)
- 2018; 2021–22: Jewelry of Ideas and Ring Redux (SCAD Museum of Art)
- 2022: American Jewelry: The Susan Grant Lewin Collection (Yale University Art Gallery)
- 2024: A Collector's Journey (Lowe Art Museum)
- 2025: Architecture = Art: The Susan Grant Lewin Collection (Paul Rudolph Institute for Modern Architecture, New York)

== Architecture Collection and Exhibitions ==
In addition to jewelry, Lewin has assembled a collection of architectural presentation drawings by major 20th- and 21st-century architects. She has described architectural drawings as:

These drawings transcend function. They are personal, poetic, and often provocative.

In 2025, the Paul Rudolph Institute for Modern Architecture in New York presented Architecture = Art: The Susan Grant Lewin Collection, featuring approximately 50 works by architects including Frank Gehry and Steven Holl, as well as architectural photography by Ezra Stoller and Paul Clemence. The exhibition was held in the landmarked Modulightor Building.

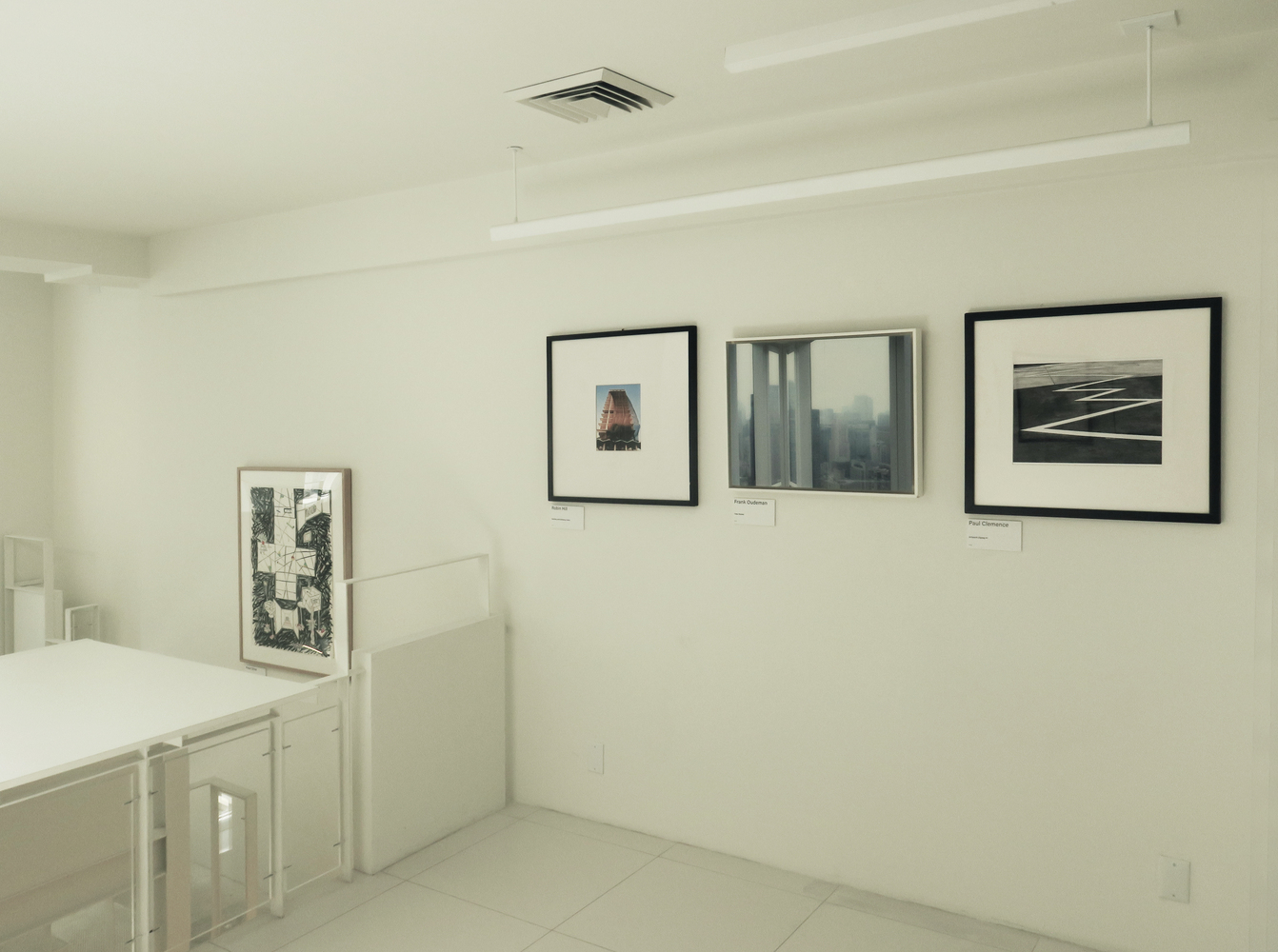
Architecture =Art: The Susan Grant Lewin Collection" exhibit at The Paul Rudolph Institute for Modern Architecture featuring the art of Paul Clemence, Frank Ouderman, Robin Hill , and P.Shire (background)

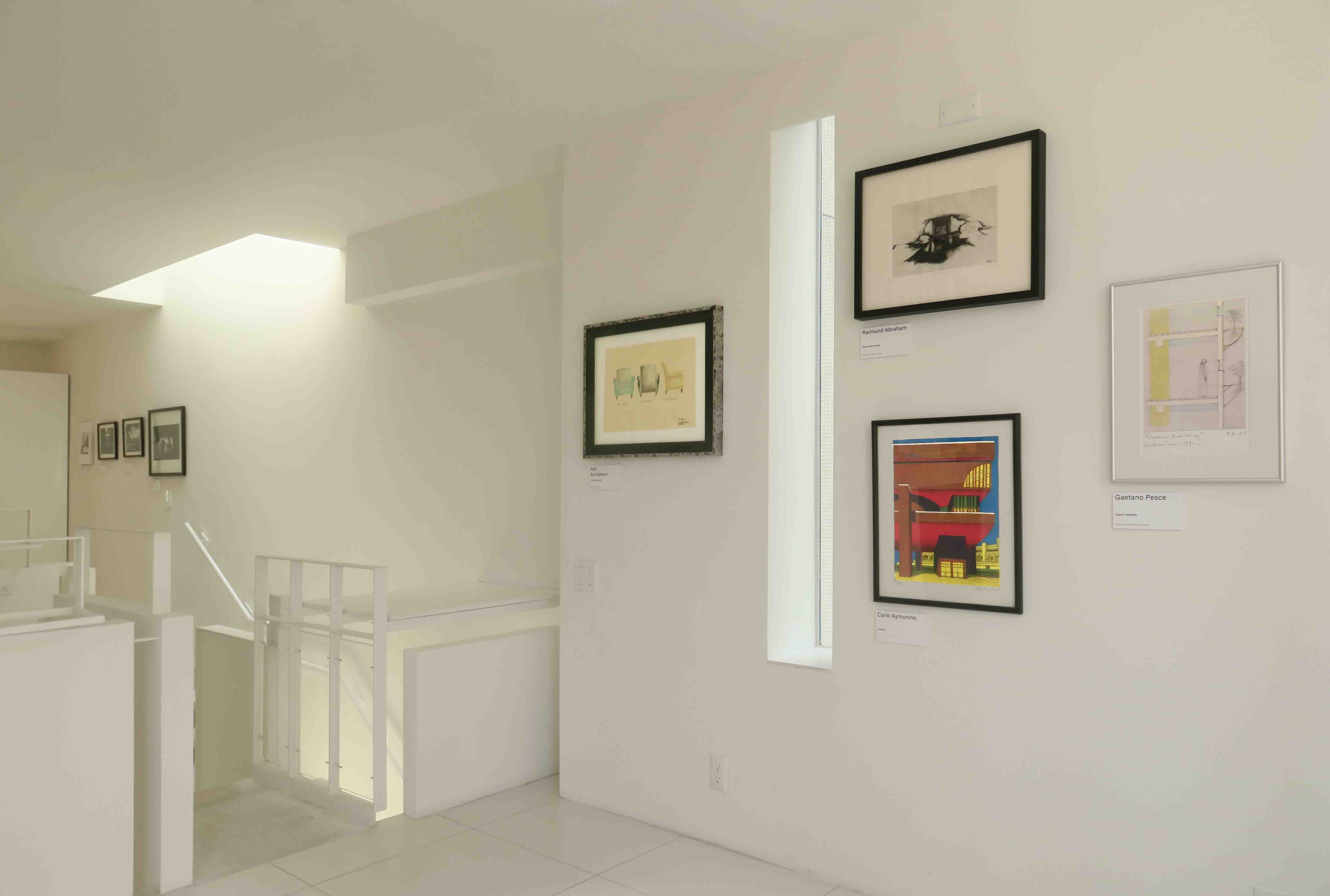
The work of Carlos Aymonino, Gaetano Pesce, Raymund Abraham, and Alan Buchsman at the exhibit "Architecture =Art: The Susan Grant Lewin Collection"

== Publications ==
Lewin's publications include:

- One of a Kind: American Art Jewelry Today (1994)
- Jewelry of Ideas: The Susan Grant Lewin Collection (2017)
- Ring Redux: The Susan Grant Lewin Collection (2021)
- A Collector's Journey: Susan Grant Lewin and the Art Jewelry World (2024)

She has contributed to international design symposia and delivered talks including the Art Jewelry Forum Speaker Series during Munich Jewelry Week.

== Boards and Affiliations ==
Over the course of her career, Lewin has served on the boards of the Architectural League of New York and the Design Trust for Public Space. Lewin also serves on the Board of Directors of the Paul Rudolph Institute for Modern Architecture, supporting exhibitions and programming related to architectural representation.

== Legacy ==
Through her collecting, publications, and advocacy, Lewin has played a significant role in elevating contemporary jewelry and architectural drawings as respected forms of fine art. Her museum donations, exhibitions, and editorial contributions continue to influence collectors, curators, and scholars in design, architecture, and craft.
