= Ragini Devi =

American performer of Indian dance (1893–1982)

- Born: Esther Luella Sherman; 18 August 1893; Petoskey, Michigan
- Died: 23 January 1982 (aged 88); Englewood, New Jersey
- Occupations: classical dancer, choreographer
- Spouse: Ramalal Balram Bajpai (m. 1921; died 1962)
- Children: Indrani Rahman
- Relatives: Habib Rahman (son-in-law)

Esther Luella Sherman (18 August 1893 – 23 January 1982), better known as Ragini Devi, was an American performer of Indian classical dance of Bharata Natyam, Kuchipudi, Kathakali and Odissi, which she popularized in the West.

== Early life ==
Ragini Devi was born Esther Luella Sherman in 1893 in the lakeside town of Petoskey, Michigan. Her mother was Ida Bell Parker Sherman and her father, Alexander Otto Sherman, had Canadian-German ancestry and was an immigrant tailor. Soon after Esther's birth, her family moved to Minneapolis, Minnesota, where Esther spent her formative years. She and younger brother, DeWitt, grew up in a clapboard house near Lake Harriet in Minnesota.

== Career ==
Esther sought out formal instruction from a local dance teacher. By the time she graduated from high school in the 1910s, her passion for dance, now well-established, led her to engage a local man (a Russian immigrant) to teach her ballet. Soon, the pair was performing a revue of "international" dances at local cabarets and small theaters around Minneapolis. Using the stage names "Rita Cassilas" and "Todi Ragini" Sherman spent her nights performing an array of Russian folk dances and self-styled Greek-and Egyptian-themed pieces, and her days studying Indian history and culture at the University of Minnesota at St Paul (most likely as a non-matriculating student).

In 1922 she moved to New York with her husband Bajpai. In New York, she found some work in silent films, but her career turned a corner on April 28, 1922, in a solo performance onstage, at Manhattan's Greenwich Village Theater. There, dancing supposedly "authentic Indian entertainments", she made her debut as "Ragini Devi", who, she lied to her American audiences, was a Kashmiri Hindu born, raised and trained to dance in India. From then on, she was known, onstage and off, as Ragini Devi (although in India, she never passed for anything other than a Westerner—albeit one with the "instincts and attitudes of an Indian").

Between 1922 and 1930, her self-styled performances earned praise from American dance critics and exotica-seekers alike. In 1928, she published her pioneering first book, "Nritanjali: An Introduction to Hindu Dancing", which earned critical acclaim in India as well as in the U.S., with June 17, 1928's edition of The New York Times calling it "a happy circumstance". In 1930, seizing her new international fame, Ragini Devi decided to travel to India, which she had been long eager to do. Committed, above all else, to dance, Devi left her husband and set sail for South India. Upon arrival, she gave birth to her only daughter, Indrani.

Devi traveled, seeking out teachers, eager to study Indian dance at its source. In Madras she studied Sadir (also known as Bharatanatyam) with ex-devadasi Mylapore Gowri Ammal of Kapaleeswarar Temple. and, travelling to the Kerala, after she received an invitation from the Maharaja of Travancore to dance in the Arts Festival. She got an opportunity to meet poet Vallathol. She became the first woman to study Kathakali at the legendary Kerala Kalamandalam. It is here where she met Gopinath, the Kathakali dancer from Travancore, who agreed to be her dance partner in her tours. She was eager to join the young nationalism-inspired effort to revive and reinvent Indian arts in a national tour aimed at introducing audiences in the rest of India to Kathakali. Shortening the length of the dances, streamlining the costumes, and staging them on an indoor proscenium stage, Ragini Devi and Gopinath gained prominence by transforming Kathakali into evening entertainment for urban theater-goers. From 1933 to 1936 they toured India, presenting their adapted Kathakali "dance dramas" to entranced audiences and rave reviews.

In 1938, Devi set sail (without Gopinath) for a European tour, which had barely begun when the escalation of European hostilities forced her to return, with her daughter, to the United States. In New York, she established the India Dance Theatre, a dance school and company on West 57th St. where she profited from the growing American interest in "ethnic" and "exotic" dance. In 1947 she traveled back to India (where her daughter, now married, was living) and in 1948 won a Rockefeller Foundation grant to support her ethnographic work. For the next several years she traveled the nation, documenting regional classical and folk dance forms.

Meanwhile, carrying on the family torch, Indrani became the first-ever "Miss India" in 1952. Soon she was one of India's best-loved cultural ambassadors, performing the dances her mother had fought to preserve before world leaders such as Mao and John F. Kennedy. Devi, half-jokingly lamenting this state of affairs, proclaimed "My daughter has already pushed me to the background. There was a time when I was known in my own right!" Throughout the late 1950s and 1960s, Devi lived in Mumbai (then known as Bombay), compiling the results of her research. She finally saw "Dance Dialects of India" published in 1978.

== Personal life ==
Esther met Ramalal Balram Bajpai (1880–1962), a young scientist from Nagpur, India and an activist for Indian independence. Bajpai was wanted by the British for defacing a public statue of Queen Victoria. He avoided capture and escaped to the United States where, in 1916, he enrolled at the University of Minnesota. In 1921, against her parents' wishes, Sherman married Bajpai in a civil ceremony in Wilmington, Delaware. Esther embraced Hinduism upon her wedding and took the name "Ragini Devi". and together they moved to Brooklyn, New York.

The couple moved to India in the 1920s. Their daughter, Indrani Bajpai, was born on September 19, 1930 in Madras. Who also studied to learn Bharata Natyam, Kuchipudi, Kathakali and Odissi dance. Indrani was crowned Miss India in 1952, and, at the age of 15, eloped to marry Habib Rahman (1915–1995), a Bengali-Muslim architect, in 1945. The couple had a son, artist Ram Rahman, and a daughter, Sukanya Rahman (Wicks), who would also dance with her mother and grandmother. Her grandsons are Wardreath and Habib Wicks.

== Death ==
She left India to retire at the Actors Fund Home assisted-living facility in Englewood, New Jersey, where she died from a stroke on January 22, 1982. Her New York Times obituary (January 26, 1982) noted that Devi's greatest achievement was that she "was instrumental in introducing dances of India to the U.S.".
