= Nassakh =

Urdu and Persian poet (1834–1889)

Khan Bahadur Nassakh
- Born: Abu Muḥammad Abdul Ghafur; 11 February 1834; Rajapur, Faridpur, Bengal Presidency
- Died: 14 June 1889 (aged 55); Calcutta, Bengal Presidency, British India
- Occupation: Government officer
- Relatives: Nawab Abdul Latif (brother); Kazi Salahuddin; Kazi Abul Monsur; Shahidul Alam
- Writing career
- Pen name: Nassakh
- Language: Urdu, Persian
- Genre: Poetry
- Notable works: Sukhan-e-Shuara, Daftar-e-Bemisal, Tazkiratul Muasirin

Khan Bahadur Abu Muḥammad Abdul Ghafur (11 February 1834 – 14 June 1889), better known by his pen name Nassakh (Urdu: نساخ), was a British Indian officer, writer, literary critic and collector. He is best known for his magnum opus Sukhan-e-Shuara (Urdu: سخن شعرا Speech of Poets) which was a biography of prominent Urdu and Persian poets. He organised mushaira in places where he worked; inspiring young Urdu poets in Bengal.

== Early life ==
Abdul Ghafur was born on 11 February 1834 to the Bengali Kazi family of Rajapur in Faridpur. His father, Qazi Faqir Muhammad, was a lawyer at the Calcutta civil court and a Persian author best known for his Jāmiʿ al-tawārīkh (جامع التواريخ Compendium of Chronicles), a history book published in 1836. Reformer Nawab Abdul Latif was his elder brother and Nassakh's two other brothers were Abdul Hamid and Abdul Bari Sayd who were also poets.

== Career ==
Ghafur joined as deputy magistrate in the British Indian government. He served as deputy collector in many places in the Bengal Presidency. In particular, he worked as deputy collector of Dacca and Backergunge from 1860 to 1888. In 1868, Elayechiram Talib of Jalalabad, Amritsar migrated to Bakerganj (Barisal) to become a student of Nassakh, who would suggest edits to Talib's poetry. Talib would also write poetry in praise of his teacher Nassakh.

== Literary career ==
Ghafur mainly wrote poetry in Urdu, but he also wrote in Persian. Apart from Bengali, Urdu and Persian, he also knew English, Arabic and Hindi.

Among his Urdu poetry are Daftar-e-Bemisal (1869), Armugan (1875), Armugani (1884). Daftar-e-Bemisal was praised by Ghalib. In Sukhan-e-Shuara (1874) and Tazkiratul Muasirin he introduced Urdu and Persian poets. He translated Persian poet Fariduddin Attar's Pand Name into Urdu under the title of Chashma-e-Faez in 1874. Ganj-e-Tawarikh (1873) and Kanz-e-Tawarikh (1877) were pieces of poetry which contained biographies of great Islamic personalities. Ashar-e-Nassakh (1866) is also one of his works on poetry. His Intikhab-e-Nakam (1879) was a critique on the marsiya poetry of Mir Anees and Mirza Dabeer. Nassakh also wrote Mazhab-e-Muamma (1888) which contained his own works of Persian poetry.

== See also ==
- Zaigham, his teacher

== Bibliography ==
- Khan, Mohammad Hamid Ali (2003). Abdul Ghafoor Nassakh [Abdul Ghafoor Nassakh: Makers of Indian Literature] (in Urdu). Delhi: Sahitya Academy.
