= Gandhi Ghat, Barrackpore =

Gandhi Ghat
- গান্ধী ঘাট (Bengali)
- Interactive map of Gandhi Ghat
- 22.7528°N 88.3623°E
- Location: Barrackpore, Kolkata, West Bengal, 700120, India

History
- Built: 11 April 1949
- Built for: Mahatma Gandhi

Site notes
- Architect: Habib Rahman
- Architectural style: Revialist Indo-Saracenic
- Governing body: Barrackpore Municipality

Gandhi Ghat (Bengali: গান্ধী ঘাট) is a memorial ghat located at Barrackpore, in the northern suburbs of the Kolkata metropolitan area, West Bengal. It was built in 1949 to commemorate Mahatma Gandhi at the eastern banks of Hooghly River, where a portion of his ashes was immersed, after his cremation.

== History ==
Following the assassination of Mahatma Gandhi in New Delhi on 30 January 1948, his ashes were distributed across India for immersion in major rivers. One of those urms, containing it, were came in West Bengal when immersed in the Hooghly River from a stepped river landing in Barrackpore on 12 February 1948, adjacent to the Governor-General of India's retreat house. The ghat's foundation was inaugurated, alongside with the immersion, by then Governor-General of India C. Rajagopalachari, and West Bengal Premier Bidhan Chandra Roy in 1948.

Shortly after the immersion, Roy commissioned the Public Works Department (PWD) of West Bengal to construct a permanent memorial at the landing. This task was assigned to Habib Rahman, a senior government architect. Completed within a year, the ghat was formally inaugurated on 15 May 1949 by Prime Minister of India Jawaharlal Nehru.

== Architecture ==
Gandhi Ghat represents a pivotal departure from both British colonial Indo-Saracenic architecture and revivalist Indian temple styles. Tasked with creating a monument that embodied Gandhi's philosophy of simplicity, truth, and interfaith harmony, Rahman avoided literal ornamental replication of religious structures.

== Gallery ==
Habib Rahman at the construction of the Gandhi Ghat, 1948

Scene of Hooghly river at Gandhi Ghat

Entry gate at Gandhi Ghat

Jawaharlal Nehru at the inauguration of Gandhi Ghat, 1949
