= Nawab Abdul Latif =

Bengali aristocrat, educator and social worker (1828–1893)

Nawab Bahadur Abdul Latif
- নবাব বাহাদুর আব্দুল লতীফ
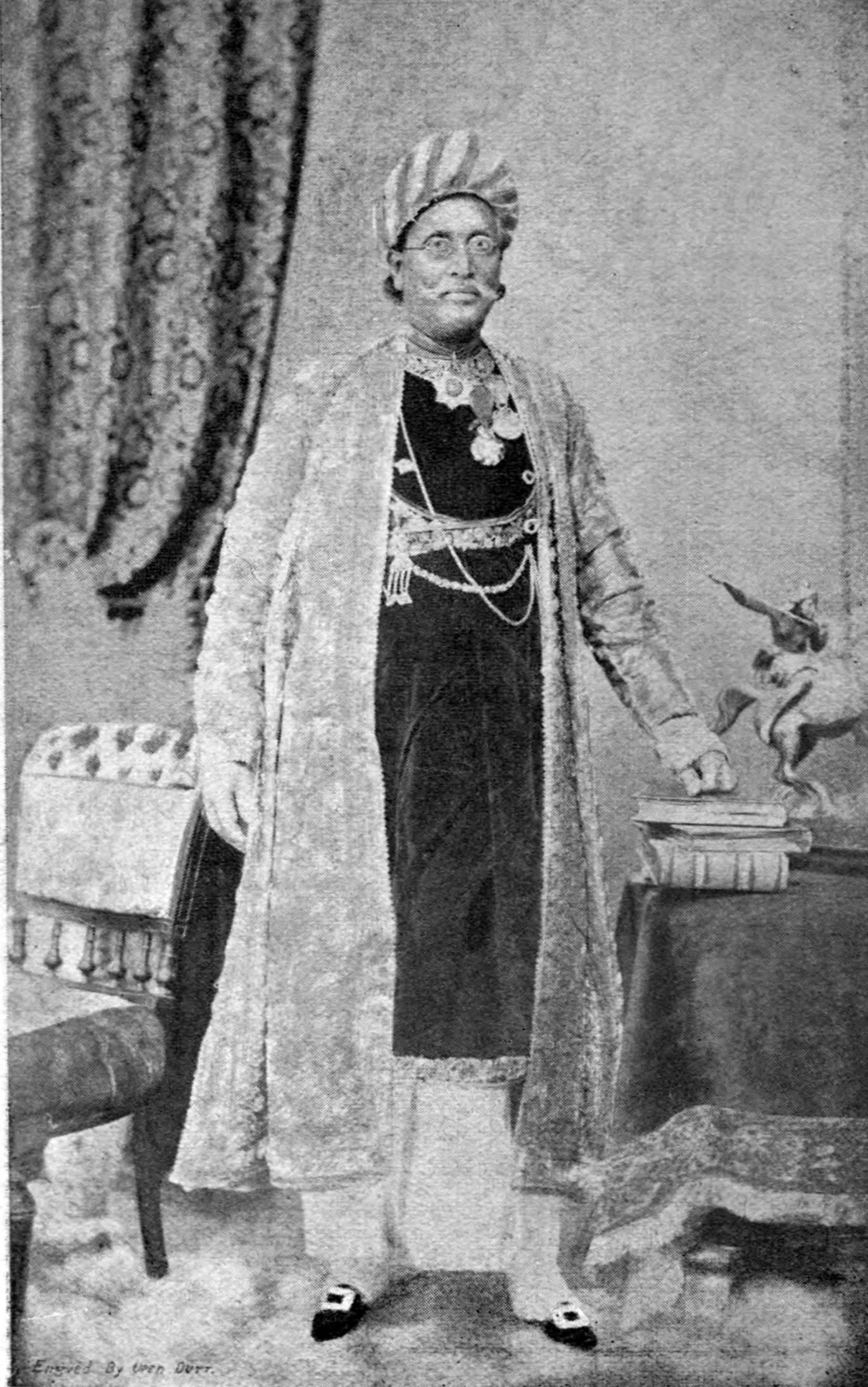
- An image of Latif from the 1910 book "Twelve Men of Bengal in the Nineteenth Century" By Francis Bradley Bradley-Birt
- Born: 1828; Rajapur, Faridpur District, Bengal Presidency, British India
- Died: 10 July 1893 (aged 64–65); Calcutta, Bengal Presidency, British India
- Education: Calcutta Madrassah (now Aliah University)
- Relatives: Abdul Ghafur Nassakh (brother); Shaista Suhrawardy Ikramullah (great-granddaughter)

Nawab Bahadur Qazi Abdul Latif (1828 – 10 July 1893) was a Bengali Muslim aristocrat, educator, and social worker. His title, Nawab was awarded by the British in 1880. He was one of the first Muslims in 19th-century India to embrace the idea of modernisation.

== Early life ==
Qazi Abdul Latif was born into an aristocratic Bengali Muslim Qazi family in Rajapur, Faridpur District, Bengal Presidency in the then British India (now in Bangladesh). The ancestors of the Qazis of Rajapur are purported to have come and settled in Bengal from Hijaz in Arabia, via Delhi, Qazi Abdur Rasul son of Shah Azimuddin whom the family claims was a descendant of Khalid ibn Walid had setltled in Faridpur during the Mughal era after being appointed as Qazi. This claim opposes the consensus of Arab genealogists that Khalid ibn al-Walid's lineage in the paternal line had died out during the Plague of Amwas. Nonetheless, Qazi Abdul Latif is said to have been a seventh generation descendant of this Shah Azimuddin. His father Qazi Faqir Mahmud (1774–1844) was a lawyer in the civil court of Kolkata. Latif had a brother, Khan Bahadur Abdul Ghafur Nassakh (1833–1889), a civil servant and a poet. He obtained the highest degree in Arabic, French and English language from Calcutta Madrassah (now the Aliah University).

== Career ==
Latif started his career as a teacher of Dhaka Collegiate School in 1846. By 1847, while still in his teens, he was appointed by the government as assistant to one of the Ameers of Sindh. He worked in this capacity for about a year. In 1847, an Anglo-Arabic class in the Calcutta Madrassa was opened for imparting instruction in English. In 1848, he was appointed Anglo-Arabic professor in-charge of this class.

Latif joined government service in 1849 as a deputy magistrate and was promoted to the post of presidency magistrate in 1877. While serving as the deputy magistrate of Satkhira, he witnessed the economic exploitation of peasant farmers by European indigo planters and merchants. He encouraged the farmers there to become united and inform the government about their grievances. He himself took some initiative in this Indigo revolt. Finally, the British colonial government formed the Indigo Commission in 1860 due to his initiative with the goal of putting an end to the repressions of indigo planters.

Latif was nominated a member of the Bengal Management Council when it was constituted in 1862 during the rule of Lord Canning. In 1863, he was appointed a member of the examination board for civil and military services and a fellow of the University of Calcutta. He was appointed as Justice of the Peace following the formation of Calcutta Corporation (Municipal Authority) during 1865–1875. When there was intense anger among the Muslim community following the adoption of a proposal by the Indian Management Council in 1865, he put forward arguments in favour of amending the bill through a memorandum submitted to the British government.

=== Mohammedan Literary Society ===
In 1863, Latif founded the Mohammedan Literary Society.

The Society gave a remarkable impetus to the cause of Muslim advancement throughout India. It attracted the notice of successive administrations, the wants and grievances of the Indian Muslim community in regard to education, legislation and other cognate matters affecting the well-being of society. The Society was the precursor of similar institutions in other parts of India. He was also an active member of the Scientific Society of Aligarh founded by Sir Syed Ahmad Khan.

== Awards ==
The British government, in recognition of his meritorious services, honoured him with titles and decorations from time to time. In 1877, at the Imperial Assemblage, at Delhi, Viceroy Lord Lytton conferred upon him the title of "Khan Bahadur" and presented him with an "Empress Medal." In April 1880, Lord Lytton conferred upon him the high title of "Nawab." In 1883, Viceroy Lord Ripon honoured him with a "Companionship of the Most Eminent Order of the Indian Empire." In 1887, on the occasion of Queen Victoria's Golden Jubilee, Viceroy Lord Dufferin conferred upon him the highest Muslim title of "Nawab Bahadur."

He received the title of 'Order of the Majedi of Third Class' from the Turkish government.

== Death and legacy ==
Latif died on 10 July 1893. The London Times, on 4 September 1893, published a short memoir of his life which ran "The skill, the firmness of resolve, and the unwearied tact and moderation with which he carried out his self-appointed task during 40 chequered years would form a noble theme for a biographer. Here we can only lament the loss which many who are trying to do good work for India have sustained by his death".

Latif's achievements include working to turn Hindu College into Presidency College and thus open it for non-Hindus as well. He also established numerous educational institutes, including Haji Muhammad Mohsin Govt. High School, Rajshahi. As a prominent personality of mid 19th century Bengal, he was the pioneer of Muslim modernization and the architect of the Muslim Renaissance, was one of those great men who appeared as saviors of their frustrated, humiliated, demoralized and disorganized fellow countrymen under colonial rule His chief contribution was in the field of education. He was among the first to understand that young Bengali Muslims should receive modern education. He understood that the Muslims of Bengal had fallen behind in everything because of their prejudices against modern education. He devoted his whole life to removing this self-destructive prejudice from their minds. However, Bangladeshi educationist Ahmed Sharif criticized him for promoting Urdu over Bengali as the language of Bengali Muslims. Latif had made a representation to the 1882 Education Commission (Hunter Commission) that the instructional language of the aristocratic Muslims should be Urdu and that of the ordinary Muslims should be Bengali with a profusion of Arabic and Persian words.

Poet Nawab Syed Muhammad Azad was Latif's son-in-law. Syud Hossain and Sahibzadi Shahbanu Begum were some of his grandchildren. Shaista Suhrawardy Ikramullah was his great-granddaughter.
