= Zaigham =

19th-century Urdu poet

Hafiz Ikram Ahmad Zaigham Rampuri
- Born: Ikram Ahmed; Rampur or Delhi
- Died: 1869; British India
- Occupations: Poet, alchemist, scholar
- Successor: Nassakh, Wahshat, Azad, Mast, Arman and Abdul Ghaffar Akhtar

Hafiz Ikram Ahmad (Urdu: حافظ اکرام احمد), or simply known by his pen name Zaigham (Urdu: ضيغم), was a 19th-century teacher and alchemist based in Bengal. He became prominent due to his talent in Urdu and Persian language poetry, specialising in ghazal and marsiya in Rekhta.

== Early life and education ==
It is considered that Ikram was born in Rampur, Agra Presidency, while others suggest he was born in Delhi but from Rampur. His name is often preceded with the title of Hafiz, a term used by Muslims for people who have completely memorised the Qur'an.

== Career ==
از عدد مدح دو تا کم رسید
Az adad-e-madah do ta kam rasid
هر چه بود قسمت ضیغم رسید Har che bud qismat-e-Zaigham rasid

— Last line of a 50-line Persian qasida by Zaigham

Zaigham migrated to Bengal at some point in his life where he gained popularity. A notable piece of poetry of his include a fifty-verse long Persian qasida. Ikram was celebrated for his metre capability. Nassakh, a contemporary Urdu poet of Bengal, praised his teacher, Ikram, on this; stating that a single ghazal written by Ikram can include up to 72 Urdu poetic metres.

He was also a teacher to a number of students to whom he taught Urdu poetry. Some include Nassakh, Hafiz Rashidun Nabi Wahshat, Mahmud Azad, Hakim Ashraf Ali Mast, Hamid Bakht Mazumdar, Arman and Khwaja Abdul Ghaffar Akhtar. He was also a tutor to the family of Nawab Syed Mahmud. It has also been said that Shaykh Haji Ilahi Bakhsh Bijan Siddiqi of Danapur was a student of Zaigham.

== See also ==
کامل فن سخن ماہر اصناف كلام کوئی ضیغم سا نظر مجھ کو نه استاد آیا
