= Nawab Syed Muhammad Azad =

19th century Bengali writer

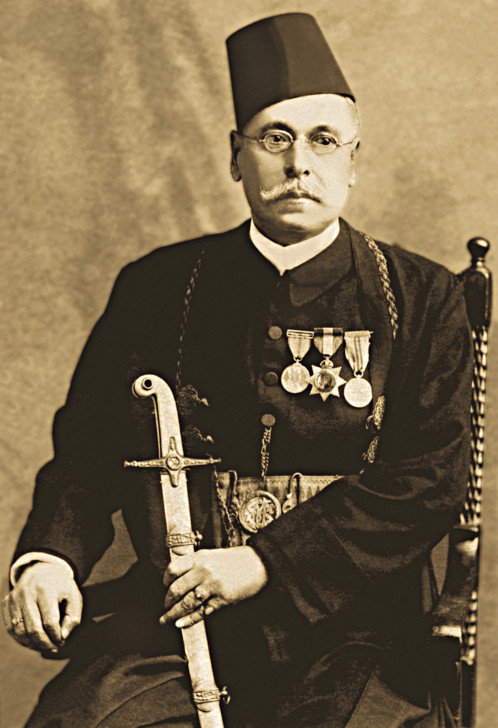
- Nawab Syed Muhammad Azad in 1909
- Born: Syed Muhammad Azad; 1850; Dhaka, India
- Died: 1916 (aged 65–66)
- Relatives: Nawab Abdul Latif (father-in-law); Syed Hossain (son); A. K. Fazlul Huq (son-in-law); Hassan Suhrawardy (son-in-law); Shaista Suhrawardy Ikramullah (granddaughter)

Nawab Syed Muhammad Azad (1850–1916) was a Bengali Urdu writer and playwright.

== Background ==
Born in Dhaka, he was the son of Syed Asaduddin Haider. His great-grandfather was Maulvi Ashraf Ali Khan, a Persian noble who achieved prominence in eastern Bengal in the latter half of the 18th century.

== Career ==
Though a high-ranking government officer, Azad also wrote articles for the Durbeen newspaper of Kolkata. He went on to write social and political commentaries in publications such as the Avadh Akhbar, Awadh Punch, Agra Akhbar and Akmalul Akhbar among others. These writings we subsequently compiled and published by Abdul Ghafoor Shahbaz under the title Khiyalat-e-Azad.

Azad also authored two plays, Nawabi Darbar and Nawabi Khel, as well as an autobiography, Maulana Azad. Wit and humour were a notable feature of his works.

== Personal life ==
Azad married the daughter of the social reformer Nawab Abdul Latif. He had seven children:

- Syed Ali Ahmed, Inspector-General of Registration in the Government of Bengal.
- Syed Ali Ashraf
- Syed Ali Hasan
- Syed Ali Mehdi
- Syed Hossain, a journalist who also served as the first Indian ambassador to Egypt under Jawaharlal Nehru.
- Khurshid Talat Begum, married to A. K. Fazlul Huq.
- Shahar Banu Begum, married to Hassan Suhrawardy.
