= Paul Clemence =

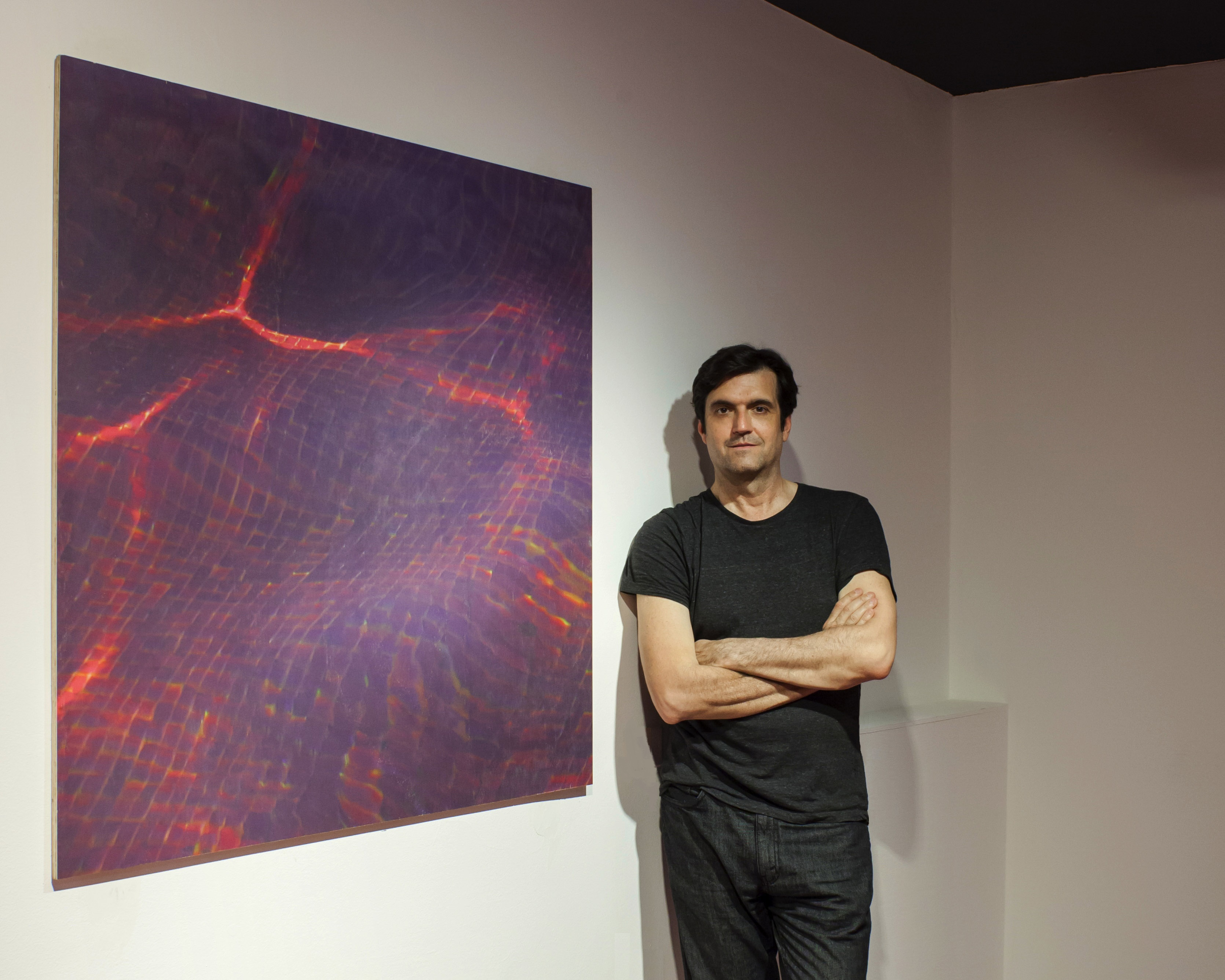
- Clemence at the 2016 Venice Biannale with his photo Red Interlude
- Born: Hackensack, New Jersey, USA
- Education: Federal University of Rio de Janeiro
- Occupations: Visual artist, fine art photographer, lecturer, curator, photojournalist, educator
- Known for: Abstract photography, large scale photographic installation, Architecture photography
- Notable work: "Modern Mirage" textile installation at Casa do Baile, Pampulha, Belo Horizonte; "SHAPES, RHYTHM, ABSTRACTION: Swiss Museums" at Le Salon Suisse, Miami Art Week 2023
- Website: www.paulclemence.com

Paul Clemence is an American-Brazilian photo-artist, focused on registering the expressive side of the built environment, particularly architecture. Beyond exhibiting his artwork, he lectures frequently and has authored several books.

== Biography ==
Born in Hackensack, New Jersey, to parents Denis and Mária Clemence, Paul Clemence grew up in Niterói, a neighboring city to Rio de Janeiro, Brazil. Upon receiving his degree in architecture at the Federal University of Rio de Janeiro, Clemence moved to Miami Beach, Florida, where he established himself as a fine art photographer with architecture as his main subject matter. During this time, he received two consecutive awards from the American Institute of Architects/Miami Chapter and had his first book published, South Beach Architectural Photographs, featuring a black-and-white photo essay on the renowned Art Deco district.

That book was followed by Mies van der Rohe’s Farnsworth House, a photo essay on one of the pre-eminent residential projects by the German modern architect Mies van der Rohe. The book has a foreword by Mies's grandson, architect Dirk Lohan. A selection of the images in the book is part of the Mies van der Rohe's Archives, housed by the Museum of Modern Art in New York City.

In 2009, Clemence established the photo-blog page "Architectural Photography", aka Archi-Photo on Facebook, featuring highlights from his photography taken on his travels around the globe. The portfolio-like blog developed into a social media community that as of 2017 has close to one million followers worldwide with an average reach of 300,000 viewers weekly. In 2015, Clemence's photo “A Tale of Two Cities” depicting the social inequalities in Rio de Janeiro through an architectural image appeared on that blog and went viral reaching over five million viewers around the world and being shared in countless other blogs and outlets. That image has now been featured in many social studies books in Brazil.

Also in 2015, Clemence was named one of the world's Top Ten architectural photographers by Top Teny website among other acclaimed professionals.

Clemence's work reflects the subjective ways of looking at buildings, spaces and cities. In his photographs shadows, reflections, textures, patterns and transparencies are the basic elements used to create abstract compositions.

Beyond his art career, his writings and images appear often in well-regarded publications like Gagosian Quarterly, Metropolis, ArchDaily, Architizer, Casa Vogue Brazil, Modern Magazine, Wallpaper Magazine, Dwell, Interior Design, Archinect, Designboom, The Design Edit, Elle Decor Italia, Architects & Artisans, Everett Potter's Travel Report, GoNomad, BBC Travel and Aishti. Clemence also lectures and conducts workshops all over the United States and abroad.

"I see photography as an art form, for me it is an opportunity to experience space and interpret it. It's a way to share with others how I see the world. An artistic venue for me to express my take on the built landscape and its subjective, yet definitive presence in our lives."

=== Achievements ===
In 2016 Clemence's work was recognized with an invitation to be part of the official Venice Biennale collateral exhibit "Time Space Existence", organized by GAA Foundation at Palazzo Bembo at the Grand Canal. Red Interlude, his presentation at the exhibit, combined an immersive oversized floor print with traditionally hung wall photos. These images all part of a series shot at the red pool atop the Hotel Unique in São Paulo, Brazil, designed by architect Ruy Ohtake. Following the Venice Biennale, Clemence's ongoing exploration of the poetic architecture of Ohtake was also the focus of Clemence's exhibit Color + Form part of the symposium “Art About Architecture" that happens during Art Basel at the Laufen Showroom.

In 2018, Clemence was a guest speaker and exhibitor at the India Architecture Dialogues (IAD) conference that took place in New Delhi, India, alongside other prominent professionals like Iwan Baan, Helene Binet and Ram Rahman. During the conference he also conducted workshops and while in India he also spoke at both the Sushant School of Art and Architecture in Gurgaon and CEPT School of Architecture in Ahmedabad.

In 2020, amidst the pandemic lockdown, Clemence celebrated the 60th anniversary of Brazil's capital, Brasília, by posting online his photo essay on the city's most iconic buildings by the Brazilian iconic architect Oscar Niemeyer. Clemence's interpretation of the visionary architecture of Brasília appeared at Wallpaper Magazine, Everett Potter's Travel Report, and his blog ARCHI-PHOTO.

As part of Clemence's ongoing portfolio of the work of Oscar Niemeyer, in 2022 the artist released a special black-and-white essay on the Espace Oscar Niemeyer in Le Havre, France, and in 2023 the series "Modern Mirage", a contemporary impressionistic take on Niemeyer's Pampulha Modern Ensemble (a UNESCO World Heritage Site). The title piece of the "Modern Mirage" series was made into a textile installation by Clemence for the exhibit "Tempo Imaginado, Tempo Vivido: 80 anos da Casa do Baile", curated by Guilherme Wisnik and Marina Frugoli. The exhibit was organized by the City of Belo Horizonte.

=== Special Commissions ===
Clemence has been awarded many special art commissions. In 2017, the Art Museums of Switzerland organization commissioned him and partner Axel Stasny to create brief video interpretations of the 12 museums part of the organization, including the Beyeler Foundation, Tinguely Museum, Kunsthaus Zurich, Kunstmuseum Basel and FotoMuseum, Zentrum Paul Klee. The series, titled "12 Impressions" included museum designs by top architects like Renzo Piano, Christ & Gantembeim, Mario Botta. The commission generated several spinoff projects. First, the art exhibit "Art of the Museum", at the Swiss Consulate General, New York featuring Clemence's photos of the museums. Following that, a special edit of the footage of the two museums designed by Renzo Piano were made into the short "TWO PIANOS" that premiered at the Architecture & Design Film Festival in New York. "TWO PIANOS" was then shown at American Institute of Architects Convention, the Master of Art Film Festival in Sofia, Bulgaria, and in 2020 at the Venice Architecture Short Film Festival in Venice, Italy. Furthermore, in the Fall of 2019 a selection of the images from the "Art of the Museum" exhibit were shown at the "Museum Forms" exhibit curated by Luciana Solano at the Galerie Espace L in Geneva, Switzerland.

In 2018, the state of Mato Grosso, Brazil, commissioned Clemence to document the historic landmarks of the state's capital, Cuiabá, as part of a special initiative to document and celebrate the state's history. In 2019, the German state of Saxony invited Clemence to visit and capture some of its most architecturally relevant buildings.

In 2019, a selection from the exhibit "Art of the Museum" portraying the Basel museums was featured at the New Museum in New York City at an event organized by the city of Basel.

In the occasion of Miami Art Week / Art Basel Miami Beach 2023, Clemence was selected to showcase a selection of his Swiss Museums on going photo series to be part of the Le Salon Suisse event, curated by Divine Bonga from Switzerland Tourism. The images in the exhibit "SHAPES, RHYTHM, ABSTRACTION: Swiss Museums" were all printed in Clemence's signature brushed aluminum prints. Beyond his exhibit, Clemence also moderated a talk on museum architecture with architect Emanuel Christ (partner at Christ & Gantenbein Architects), Andy Klemmer (President of Paratus Group), and Donna de Salvo (Special Project Curator at Dia Art Foundation).

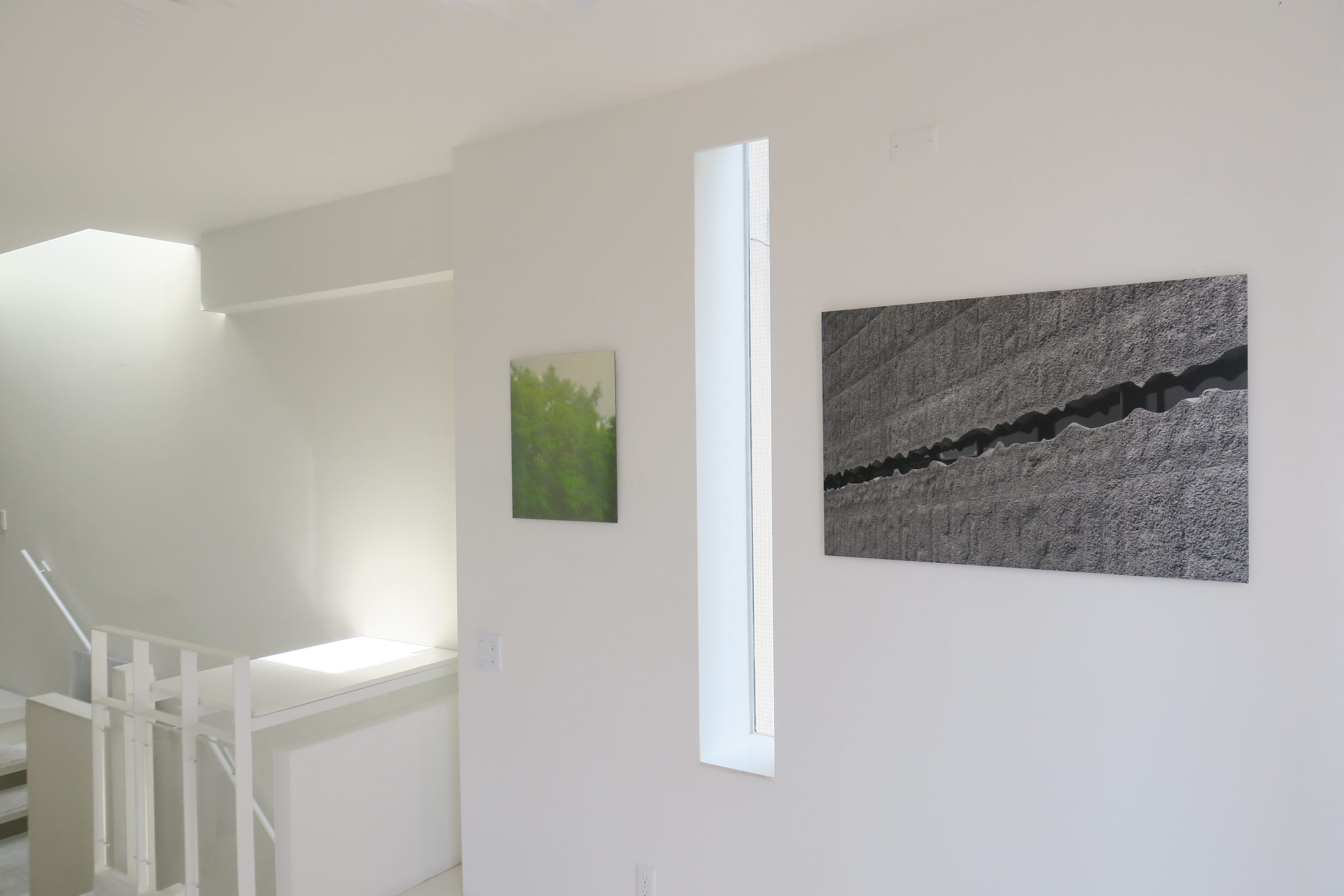
“Paul Clemence: "Shapes, Rhythm, Abstraction/Swiss Museums” exhibit at Paul Rudolph Institute for Modern Architecture, with photograph of Schaulager /Laurenz Foundation close-up on the foreground.

A new edition of the exhibit, curated by Eshaan Mehta and titled "PAUL CLEMENCE: SHAPES, RHYTHM, ABSTRACTION/Swiss Museums", then took place at the Paul Rudolph Institute for Modern Architecture in October 2025 with support by Switzerland Tourism. In conjunction with the exhibit, an artist conversation between Clemence and Nathalie Herschdorfer, internationally renown photography curator and Director of Photo Elysée, in Lausanne, was held at the Institute, addressing the nuances of Clemence's oeuvre the art of capturing architecture

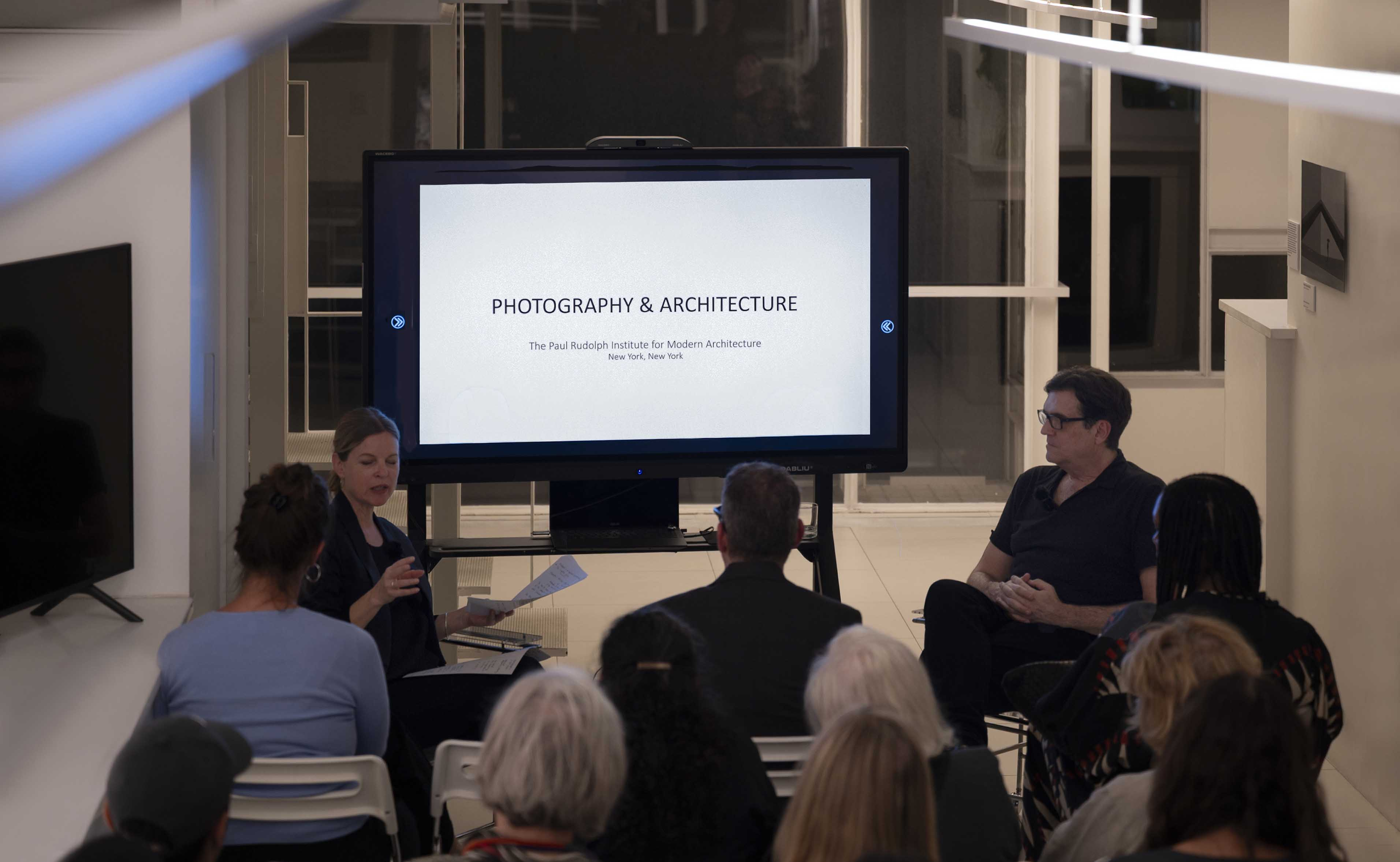
Artist Paul Clemence and Photo Elysée museum director Nathalie Herschdorfer in conversation at the Paul Rudolph Institute for Modern Architecture. Photo by Andrina Imholz, courtesy of Switzerland Tourism.

== Exhibitions and collections ==
=== Solo exhibitions ===
- 2004, "Building Abstraction", NOW Showroom, Miami, FL
- 2005, "Mies", School of Architecture at FIU, Miami, Florida
- 2006, "Farnsworth House”, Luminaire, Chicago, IL
- 2008, "Construkts", Chelsea Galeria, Wynwood, Miami, FL
- 2009, "SKIN", ArtsPark at Young Circle, Hollywood, FL
- 2011, "Green Provocateur", Urban Intervention, Milan, Italy
- 2011, "Architecture+Art=Photography", São Paulo, Brazil
- 2012, "Future Present", Boomspdesign, São Paulo, Brazil
- 2015, "Before HERE/AFTER", Parson's SCE, New York, NY
- 2015, "Walk on Water",” Wanted Design, Brooklyn, NY
- 2017, "Urban Beehive", with AmazeLab at Wanted Design, Brooklyn
- 2018, "Art of the Museum", Swiss Consulate New York
- 2020, "Brasília Diptych", Consulado-Geral do Brasil, New York
- 2021, "Meditations: The Photography of Paul Clemence", Miami Beach Botanical Gardens, Miami Beach, Florida
- 2023, "SHAPES, RHYTHM, ABSTRACTION: Swiss Museums", Miami Beach, Florida

=== Group exhibitions ===
- 2008, "Paulo Werneck, Muralista Brasileiro", Paco Imperial, Rio de Janeiro, Brazil
- 2010, "Rubens Meets the Contemporary Artis", KunstMeile, Siegen, Germany
- 2011, "Inventory /Soul Does Matter", DesignMiami. Miami
- 2012, "Boffo Showhouse", New York, NY
- 2012, ”City Fragment" at Inventory 03, DesignMiami, Miami
- 2013, "It's About Time!", Miami International Airport, Miami
- 2013, "Time:04", DesignMiami / ArtBasel
- 2016, "Time Space Existence", Venice Biennale, Italy
- 2016, "Fall Exhibit", La Vague de St.Paul, Vence, France
- 2019, "Museum Forms", Galerie Espace L, Geneva, Switzerland
- 2020, "Fotos Pró Rio", Online initiative, Rio de Janeiro, Brazil
- 2020, "INTERSECTIONS", Manhatthan, New York
- 2024, "Art in Brackets Cabinet", Park Slope, Brooklyn
- 2025, "Architecture=Art: The Collection of Susan Grant Lewin", The Paul Rudolph Institute
- 2025 , "Art Dialogues / Shapes Line Space", Selva, New York City

=== Selected collections ===
- Mies van der Rohe Archives, housed by Museum of Modern Art, NY
- Farnworth House Study Center, Plano, IL
- Marriott Hotels, Miami, FL
- Riha Design Group, Cleveland, OH
- Vasari Project, Miami, FL
- Susan Grant Lewin, New York City

=== Selected private collections ===
- Martin and Cricket Taplin, Miami Beach, FL
- Mr. David Caruso, Miami Beach, FL
- Julie Davidow, Fort Lauderdale, FL
- Francie Bishop Good, Fort Lauderdale, FL
- James McKenzie, Washington, DC
- Cristiana Mascarenhas, New York, NY
- Henrique and Stephania Thoni, Niterói, Brazil
- Marcus and Christina Boeira, Ottawa, Canada
- Maurice Barrera, New York City
- John di Prizito, Long Beach, NY
- Oliver Weirich & Stephan Stephan Stöhrer, Cologne, Germany

=== Awards ===
- 1st place, 1992, American Institute of Architects/ National Photography Competition
- 2nd place, 1993, American Institute of Architects/ National Photography Competition

=== Books ===
- Mies Van der Rohe's Farnsworth House. June 21, 2016. Paul Clemence. Author, Photographer
- South Beach Architectural Photographs. July 16, 2016. Paul Clemence. Author
- Miami Contemporary Artists (Schiffer Books). October 8, 2007. Paul Clemence. Author
- Here/After: Structures in Time. co-author Robert Landon, Dec. 2013
- "Modern Mirage: A Photographic Essay by Paul Clemence", June 2025, Paul Clemence
