= Janamejaya Mitra Arman =

19th-century Bengali Urdu poet (1796–1869)

Raja Janamejaya Mitra "Arman" (Note: Urdu: جنمے جئے مِتر ارمانؔ, Bengali: জনমেজয় মিত্র) (1796 – 1869) was an Urdu poet of Bengal.

== Biography ==
Janamejaya Mitra was born on 5 October 1796 in Calcutta to Brindaban Chandra Mitra, son of Raja Pitambara Mitra. He belonged to the lineage of Sanskrit scholar Kalidās Mitra. His early education was under the supervision of his grandfather Pitambara Mitra who had taught him Persian and Sanskrit. He later studied various languages like Braj Bhasha, Bangla, and Urdu, and wrote in several of them. He was an expert in Persian, yet no surviving written text in that language is known to exist. In Urdu poetics, he became the disciple of Zaigham, a most noted teacher of his times, and adopted the pen name "Armān". He was a contemporary of Ghalib and one of his ghazals became popular in Ghalib's homeland. In 1824, Arman shifted with his family from the ancestral home in Machua Bazar to Surah (now Beliaghata), where he lived for the rest of his life. He did not embrace a princely position but devoted himself to literature entirely. He was in poor health from 1854 onwards and died on 25 August 1869 at 73.

== Works ==
Some of his notable works in Urdu, Sanskrit, Bengali, and Braj Bhasa include:

1. Muntakhabut Tazkirā (Selected biographical memoir)
2. Tazkira Nuskha-i-Dilkushā (Biographical dictionary)
3. Diwan-i-Armān (Collection of poems)
4. Collection of Sanskrit Bhajans
5. Collection of Bengali Bhajans
6. Review of 18 Purāṇas
7. Explanatory notes on Bhāgavata Purāṇa
