= Habib Rahman (architect) =

Indian architect (1915–1995)

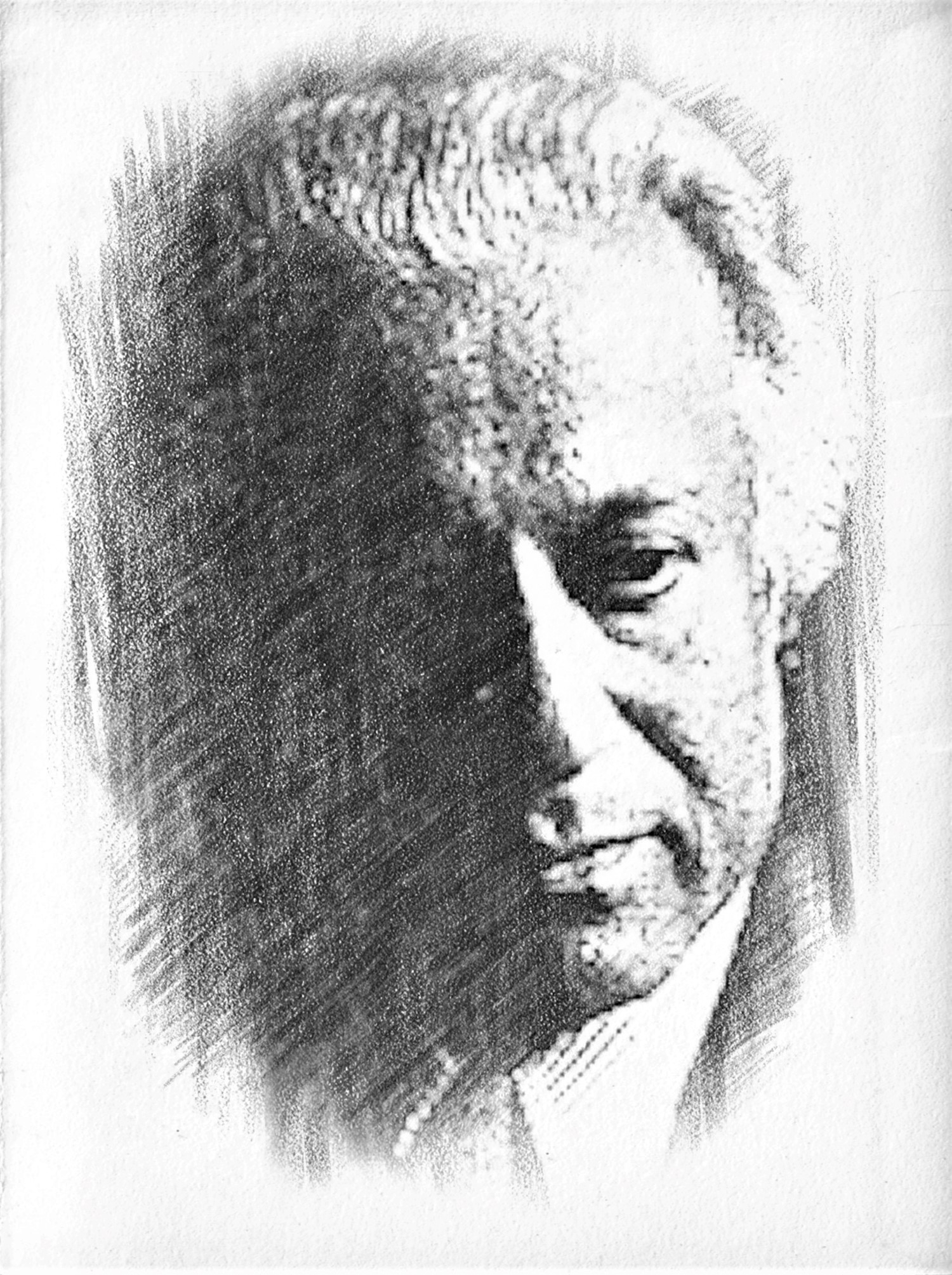
- Born: 1915; Calcutta, Bengal Presidency, British India
- Died: 19 December 1995 (aged 79–80)
- Occupation: Architect
- Spouse: Indrani Bajpai
- Children: Ram Rahman; Sukanya Rahman

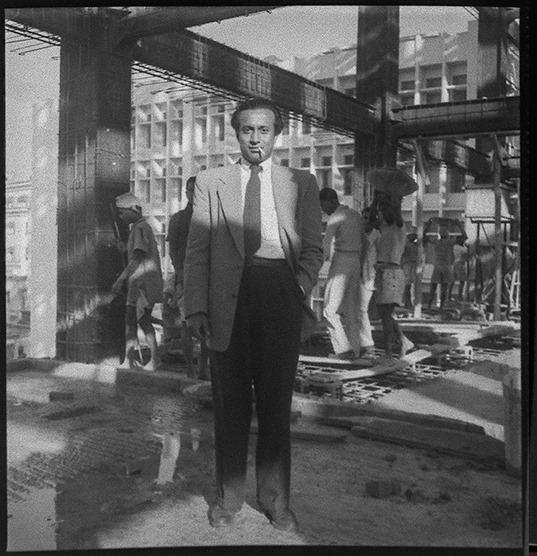
Habib Rahman at the under-construction New Secretariat Building, Calcutta

Habib Rahman (1915 – 19 December 1995) was an Indian architect. Regarded as a pioneer of the Bauhaus style of architecture in India, Rahman was known for combining Indian architectural elements into modernist designs.

Born in Calcutta, Rahman was educated at the University of Calcutta and later at the Massachusetts Institute of Technology. After a brief stint in the United States, he returned to India in 1946, and was appointed senior architect for the government of West Bengal. Rahman's work in West Bengal includes the Gandhi Ghat, Bengal Engineering College, and New Secretariat building.

In 1953, Rahman moved to Delhi to work for the central government, and designed various public buildings, including the National Zoological Park, and the Rabindra Bhavan. He also designed the tombs of Maulana Azad, Zakir Husain, and Fakhruddin Ali Ahmed.

He was awarded the Padma Shri in 1955, and the Padma Bhushan in 1974.

== Early life and education ==
He was born in 1915 in Calcutta. His father was a judge. Habib Rahman obtained his bachelor's degree in mechanical engineering in 1939 from the University of Calcutta. He studied at the Massachusetts Institute of Technology and obtained his Masters in Architecture in 1944 (the first Indian to complete this program). From 1944 to 1946, he worked at the architecture firms of Lawrence B. Anderson, William Wurster, Walter Gropius, and Ely Jacques Kahn in Boston.

== Work in Calcutta (1946-1953) ==
He returned to Calcutta in 1946 and worked as senior architect of the government of West Bengal from 1947 to 1953.

His first major project was the Gandhi Ghat in Calcutta, a memorial to Mahatma Gandhi built in 1949. The design impressed Prime Minister Jawaharlal Nehru and he invited Rahman to Delhi to design government buildings.

Rahman's other work in Calcutta includes the fourteen-storied new Secretariat building, completed in 1954. The building was India's first steel frame high rise and remained the tallest building in Calcutta until 1963.

== Work in Delhi (1953-1976) ==
In 1953, Habib Rahman was appointed senior architect of the Central Public Works Department in New Delhi.

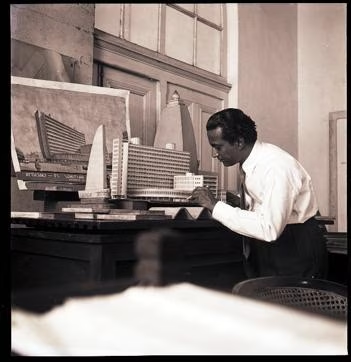
Architect Habib Rahman in his Calcutta studio, late 1940s

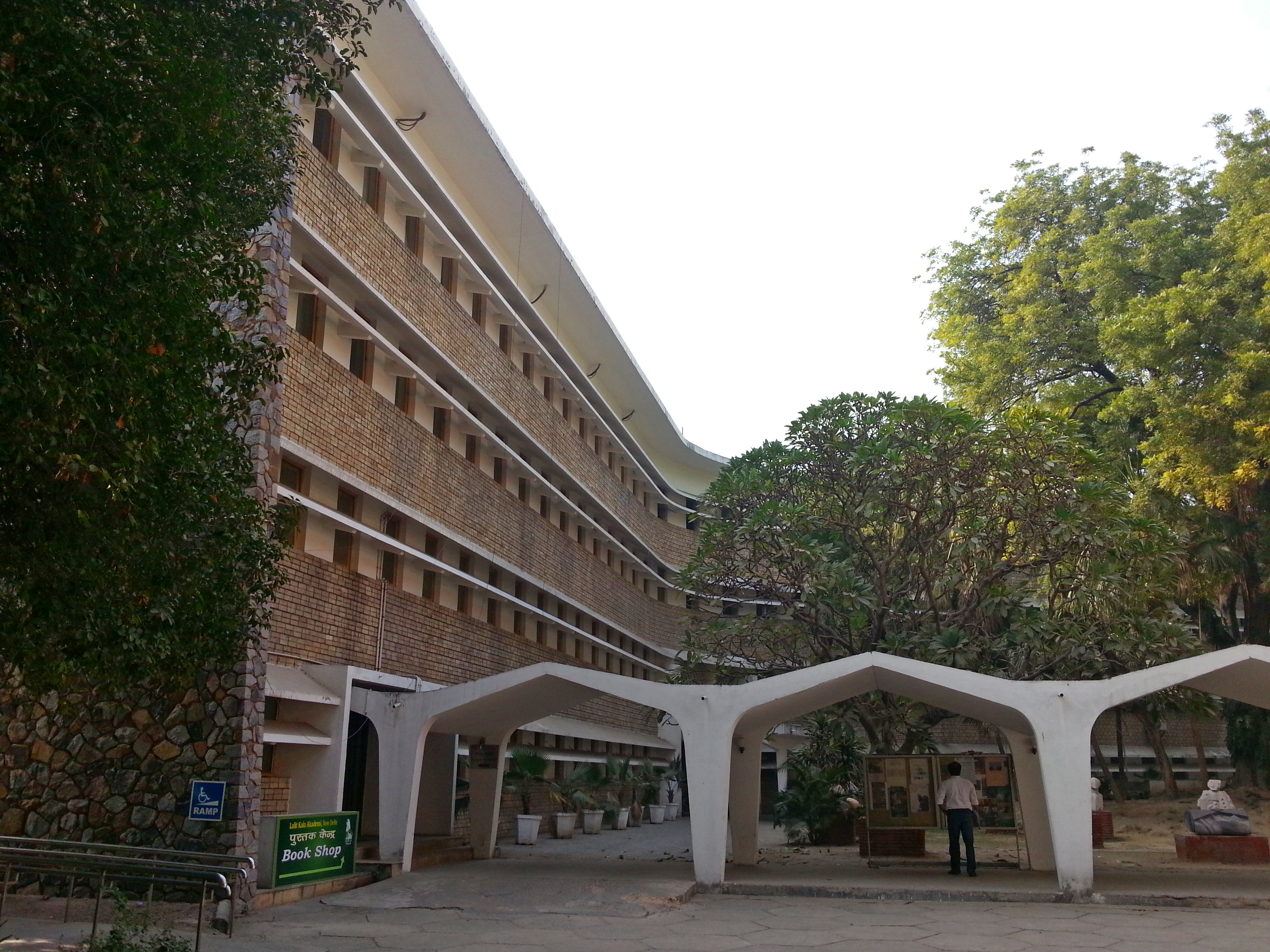
Rabindra Bhawan (1961), Delhi.

His early designs in Delhi include the University Grants Commission building (1954), Dak Bhavan (1954), and Comptroller and Auditor General building (1958).

In 1959, he designed the tomb of Maulana Azad. Azad was buried in the area between the Red Fort and Jama Masjid. As per Nehru's requirements, the design of the tomb was not to conflict with the heritage sites, and to reflect the "humble personality" of Azad. The tomb is a modernist interpretation of the chhatri, made up of white marble and cement, set in a charbagh garden.

In the early 1960s, he was commissioned to design the Rabindra Bhavan, which would house the Lalit Kala, Sangeet Natak and Sahitya academies. Initial designs were overruled by Nehru.

He designed the Rabindra Bhavan in 1961 (or 1963), the World Health Organization in Delhi in 1962 (demolished in July 2019), the Sardar Patel Bhawan in 1973 (opposite to the Dak Bhawan). He also designed the National Zoological Park that opened in 1959 (which included historical ruins, and housed over a thousand animal species).

He designed the tomb of Zakir Husain, with its sloping walls inspired by Tughlaq tombs.

In 1970, he was appointed chief of the Central Public Works Department. From 1974 to 1977, he was Secretary of the Delhi Urban Arts. Habib's final major project was the tomb of Fakhruddin Ali Ahmed (1976).

In 1977, his contract was discontinued after he opposed several projects conceived by the government. These including building a second Connaught Place in New Delhi, placing of Gandhi's statue under King George's canopy at India Gate, and the building of public urinals blocking the southern entrance to Jama Masjid.

== Later life and death ==
After retiring, he remained active as a consultant despite poor health. He had one leg amputated below the knee in 1985. He died in 1995.

== Bibliography ==
- S M Akhtar, Habib Rahman, The Architect of Independent India, 2016 (ISBN 978-9383419340)

== Awards ==
- 1955: Padma Shri
- 1974: Padma Bhushan
- 1995: JK Cement Architect of the Year Chairman's Award for Life Achievement

== Personal life ==
In 1945 he married Indrani Rahman, Miss India 1952 and an Odissi dancer. The couple had two children, Ram Rahman and Sukanya Rahman.

Habib was an atheist, described as "greatly suspicious of all organized religions" by his son Ram Rahman.
