= Indrani Rahman =

Indian classical dancer (1930–1999)

- Indian Classical Dancer, who brought Kuchipudi Dance from the village to India's Capital, Delhi
- Born: Indrani Bajpai; 19 September 1930; Madras, Madras Presidency, British India
- Died: 5 February 1999 (aged 68); New York City, U.S.
- Occupations: Indian classical dancer, choreographer,
- Spouse: Habib Rahman (m. 1945; died 1995)
- Children: Ram Rahman; Sukanya Rahman
- Mother: Ragini Devi
- Awards: 1969: Padma Shri; 1981:Sangeet Natak Akademi Award

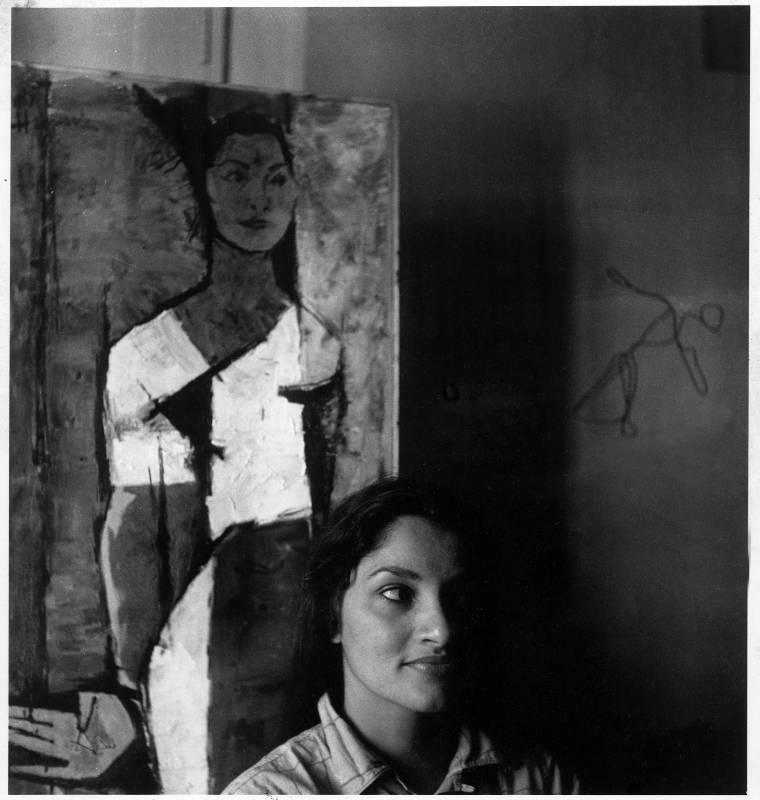
Indrani Rahman with her portrait Indrani by M. F. Husain

Indrani Rahman (née Bajpai, 19 September 1930 – 5 February 1999) was an Indian classical dancer of Bharatanatyam, Kuchipudi, Kathakali, Odissi and the country's first beauty pageant titleholder. She later became popular in the West and settled in New York City in 1976.

In 1952, she won the Miss India pageant and then represented India in the first Miss Universe pageant. Later, she joined her mother Ragini Devi's company. She popularised the Indian classical dance form, Odissi during her international tours. Indrani had received the Padma Shri in 1969 and the Sangeet Natak Akademi Award in the performing arts and also the Taraknath Das Award.

== Background and family ==
Indrani Rahman was born in Chennai (then Madras), the daughter of Ramalal Balram Bajpai (1880–1962), sometime president of the Indo-American League, by his wife Ragini Devi (née Esther Luella Sherman). Her father, Ramalal Bajpai, was a Maharashtrian from Nagpur, a chemist who went to the US for higher education. Here he met and married Esther Luella Sherman, an American by birth. Born in Petoskey, Michigan in 1893, (died 1982), Esther embraced Hinduism upon her wedding and took the name 'Ragini Devi.'

The couple moved to India in the 1920s. Ramalal then took a job as assistant editor of Young India, the magazine founded by Lala Lajpat Rai. After Independence, he became the Consul General of India at New York, and president of the Indo-American League. Meanwhile, Ragini became a passionate proponent of Indian classical dance and devoted her life to their revival and nurture. This happened after a fateful meeting with the great rajadasi, (royal courtesan) Jetti Tayamma of Mysore, from whom she started learning Bharata Natyam. She then honed her dancing talents under the tutelage of Gauri Amma, a courtesan of Chennai. Ragini then became a celebrated dancer herself, and was among the most feted performers of the 1930s. Ragini also championed the revival of Kathakali during the same period.

Indrani was born in Chennai to this couple and grew up in a mixed-race household. She was brought up to be uninhibited and independent by her American mother, who encouraged her to participate in beauty pageants. As one of very few participants from across the country who could be persuaded to contest the pageant, Indrani was crowned 'Miss India' in the year 1952.

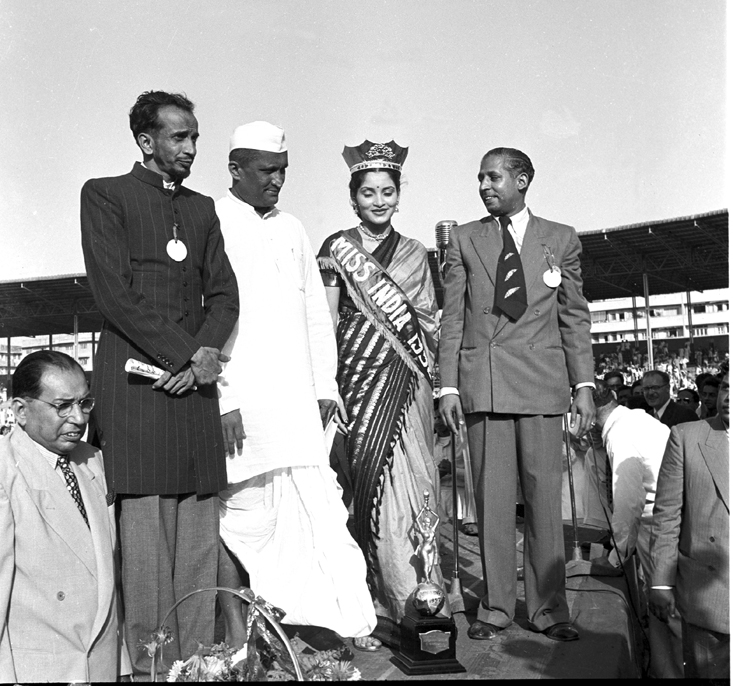
Indrani Rehman after being crowned Miss India 1952, with Indian Congress leader S.K. Patil, and two of the sponsors of the contest

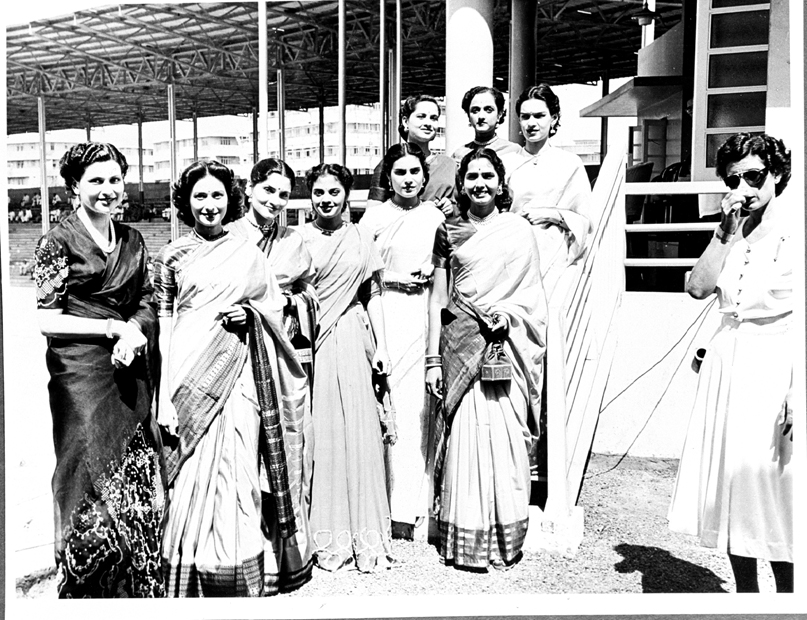
Indrani Rehman (third from left) and the runner-up Miss Suryakumari (sixth from left) with Miss India 1952 participants

== Career ==
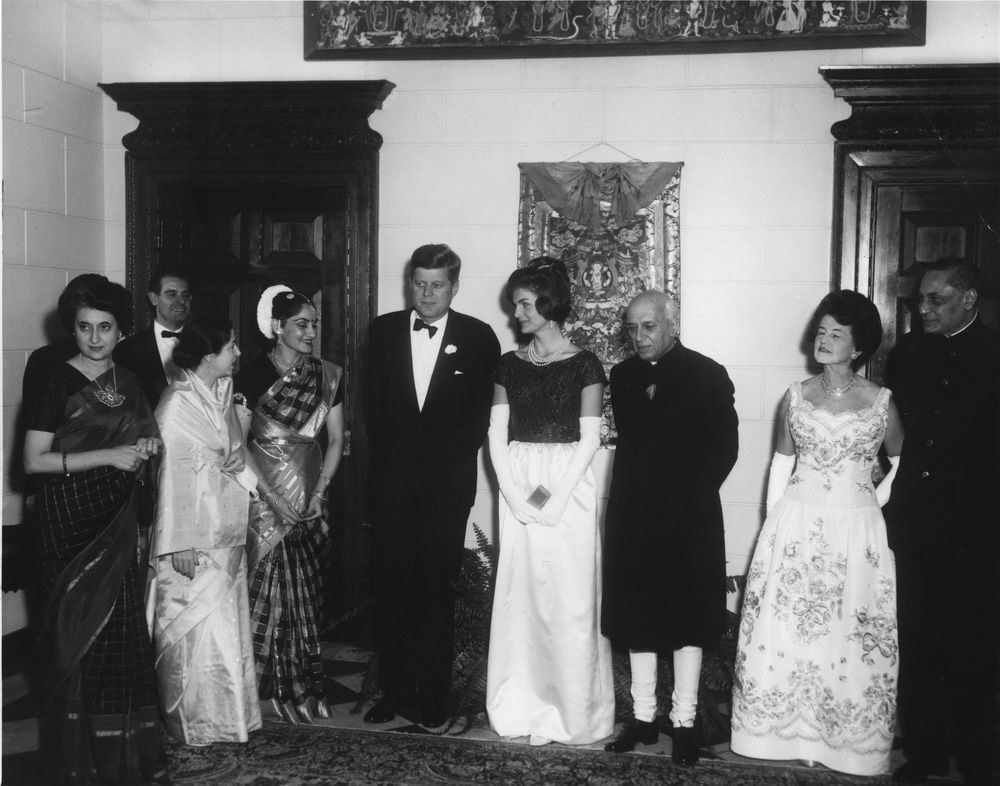
Dinner in Honor of President John F. Kennedy Given by Prime Minister Jawaharlal Nehru. Rahman fourth from left

Indrani started learning dance in her mother's company, at age nine, and accompanied her as she travelled through, Americas, and Europe. Professionally, she first started with Bharata Natyam, having learnt the Pandanallur style of Bharata Natyam from Guru Chokkalingam Pillai (1893–1968) in the 1940s. Soon she was in Vijaywada, learning Kuchipudi from Korada Narsimha Rao with whom she later toured many parts of the world.

In 1947, Indrani attracted the attention of India's leading dance and art critic Charles Fabri, who later encouraged her to go to Orissa and learn the little-known classical dance form of Odissi, making her the first professional dancer to learn Odissi. After learning Odissi for three years, from Guru Sri Deba Prasad Das, she went on to popularise it, through performance in various parts of India and the world.

In 1952, although married, and with a child, she became the first Miss India, and went on to compete in Miss Universe 1952, held in Long Beach, California. Soon, she was travelling along with her mother and performing all over the world. In 1961, she was the first dancer presented on a national tour by the Asia Society, and also performed for US President John F. Kennedy and Prime Minister Jawaharlal Nehru, during Nehru's official visit to Washington, D.C., and in the following years she also performed for Emperor Haile Selassie, Queen Elizabeth II, Mao Zedong, Nikita Khrushchev, and Fidel Castro. In 1976 she became a faculty member of the dance division at the Juilliard School at New York's Lincoln Center for the Performing Arts, taught in various American universities, including Harvard, and spent her remaining two decades in the United States, touring extensively.

== Personal life ==
At the age of 15 she eloped and married Habib Rahman (1915–1995), a well-known architect, in 1945, the couple had a son, artist, Ram Rahman, and a daughter, Sukanya Rahman (Wicks), who also danced with her mother and grandmother. Her grandsons are Wardreath Wicks and Habib Wicks.

== Death ==
Indrani Rahman died on 5 February 1999 in Manhattan, New York.

== Awards ==
- 1952: Femina Miss India
- 1969: Padma Shri
- 1981: Sangeet Natak Akademi Award
