= Ram Rahman =

Indian photographer

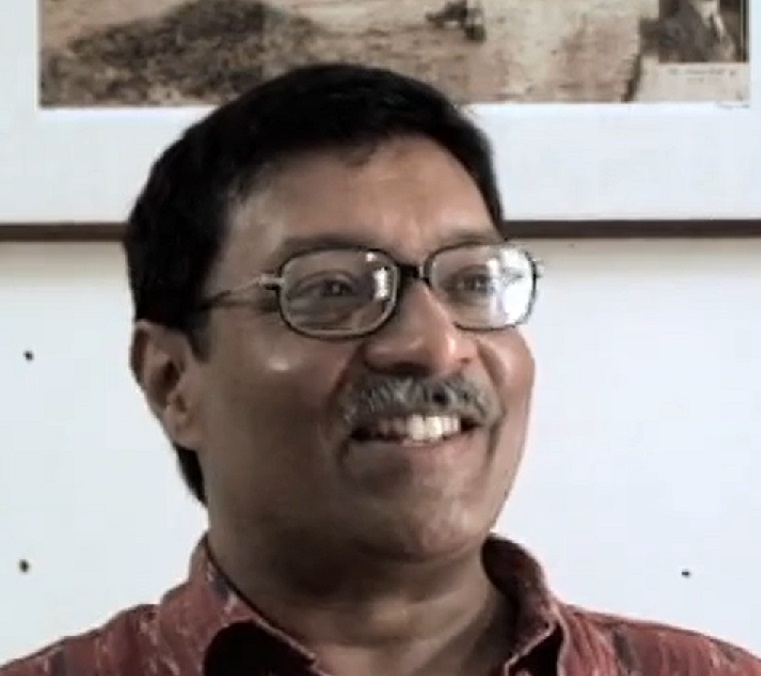
Ram Rahman 2012

Ram Rahman is a noted contemporary Indian photographer and curator. based in Delhi. He is one of the founding members of the Safdar Hashmi Memorial Trust (SAHMAT) in New Delhi, a leader in the resistance to communal and sectarian forces in India through its public cultural action.

== Early life and education ==
Ram Rahman was born in 1955 to Indrani Rahman, a classical Indian dancer, and Habib Rahman, a noted Indian architect. Ram Rahman completed his degree in Physics from the Massachusetts Institute of Technology. He also received a degree in Graphic Design from the Yale University School of Art in 1979.According to M127 he did some architecture studies in Delhi.

== Awards ==
Ram Rahman received the Forbes India Art Award in the year 2014 for best "exhibition of Indian art curated on an international stage". Ram Rahman had curated "The Sahmat Collective: Art and Activism in India since 1989" at the Smart Museum of Art, Chicago which showcased work of more than 60 artists showcasing two decades of contemporary Indian Art within the political sphere.

== Exhibitions ==
Ram Rahman has shown his photographs in individual and group shows in India and around the world. His works have been exhibited at the India International Centre, Delhi (Imaging Delhi, 2011); Duke University, Raleigh (Street Smart, 2000); Bodhi Art, Rabindra Bhavan, New Delhi (Bioscope, 2008); Cleveland Museum of Art, Cleveland, Ohio (2002); Admit One Gallery, New York (2000); Triveni Gallery, New Delhi (1978); Brunswick Public Library, Brunswick, Maine (1977); Rotch Visual collections, MIT, Cambridge (1977) and many other galleries and institutions around the world. His works have been exhibited as part of many groups shows in India and abroad. Ram's most recent group show was 'Touched by Bhupen', exhibited at Galerie Mirchandanni and Steinruecke, Mumbai, 2013. Other prominent group shows include 'Where Three Dreams Cross', White Chappel Gallery, London (2010); 'Public Places, Private Spaces' at the Newark Museum (2007); 'I fear, I believe, I desire' at Gallery Espace, New Delhi; 'Woman / Goddess', British Council, New Delhi (1999);'Context as Content – Museum as Metaphor', The Museum of Fine Arts, Punjab University, Chandigarh (2001), etc.

Ram has curated several exhibitions including Rare Vintage Photographs – 1940s-1960s (2014); The SAHMAT Collective: Art and Activism in India since 1989 exhibited at Smart Museum of Art, The University of Chicago, and The Ackland Art Museum, Chapel Hill, North Carolina (2013); The United Art Fair, New Delhi (2013); Delhi Modern: The Architectural Photographs of Madan Mahatta, 1956–1984, Photoink Gallery, Delhi Goethe Institute, Bombay (2012); HEAT, Bose Pacia Modern, New York (2003), etc.

== Books authored ==
- Sunil Janah: Photographs 1940–1960. Published by Vijay Kumar Aggarwal. First Edition (2014). ISBN 978-81-929202-0-7
- The Sahmat Collective: Art and Activism in India since 1989. Co-edited with Jessica Moss. Published by Chicago: The Smart Museum of Art (2013). ISBN 9780935573534
- Defending Husain in the Public Sphere: The SAHMAT Experience, Essay in Barefoot across the Nation, MF Husain and the Idea of India. Edited by Sumathi Ramaswamy. Published by Routledge, 2010 Edited by Sumathi Ramaswamy, Routledge, 2010. ISBN 978-0-415-58594-1
