= Bakht Khan =

Indian military officer (1797–1859)

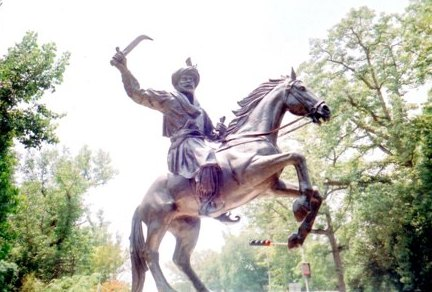
- Equestrian statue of Bakht Khan
- Born: 1797; Bijnor, Rohilkhand, Oudh State
- Died: 1859 (aged 61–62); Terai, Kingdom of Nepal
- Occupations: Subedar in the East India Company Army, Commander-in-chief of Indian rebels under the Mughal Emperor
- Known for: Indian Rebellion of 1857

Bakht Khan (1797–1859) was the commander-in-chief of the Indian rebel forces in the city of Delhi during the Indian Rebellion of 1857 against the East India Company.

Khan was born in 1797 and died in 1859. He was born in the region of United Provinces (Rohilkhand) in the district of Bijnor. Later, in the army of the East India Company, he became a subedar (the chief native commanding officer). He gained forty years of experience in the Bengal Horse Artillery. Khan was popular among the British Officers before he became a rebel. He was even familiar with those officers who were to serve against him during the blockade of Delhi in 1857. He was described as the “most intelligent character” of the rebellion by British officers. He suffered a financial crisis during the time of war. After being deported from Delhi, he was wounded by the British during the time of rebellion and died in the Terai plains of Nepal in 1859.

== Early life ==
Though many Urdu writers have described Bakht Khan as being of Rohilla heritage, none of them gave his clear family background. One of the British military officers, who took part in the suppression of his revolt, stated him to be from a Hindu family, which later converted to Islam. According to a British spy, Munshi Jiwan Lal, Bakht Khan claimed to be a Mughal and related to the family of Bahadur Shah Zafar. Khwaja Hasan Nizami claimed him to be related to Nawabs of Oudh from his maternal side and Ghulam Kadir Rohilla from his paternal side, however, without stating any authority.

He was born at Bijnor in Rohilkhand and later became a subedar, the chief native commanding officer, in the army of the East India Company, gaining forty years of experience in the Bengal horse artillery and seeing action in the First Anglo-Afghan War. In the British Indian artillery, North Indian MusIims were generaIIy preferred and made the majority of the establishment.

Before the rebellion, Bakht Khan was well known to several British officers, including several who were to serve against him during the Siege of Delhi in 1857. One colonel described him as being "a most intelligent character".

== The revolt ==
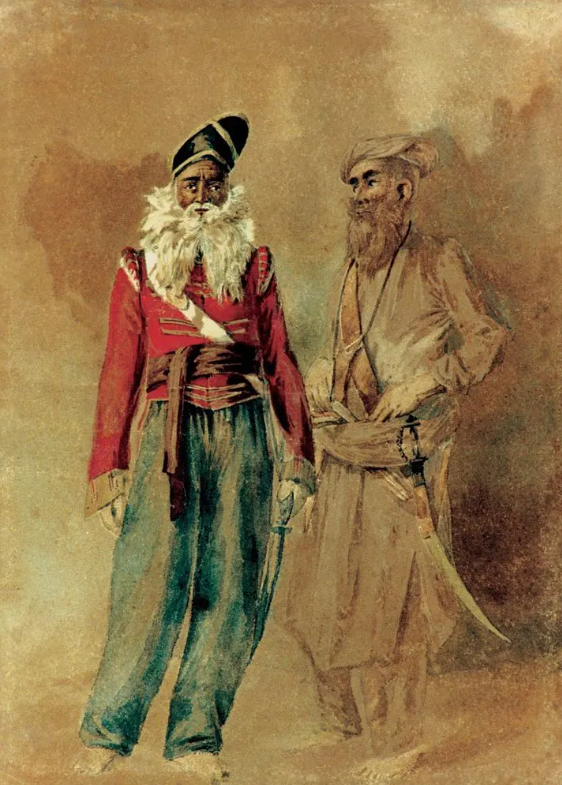
A pensioned sepoy, Moradabad, 1842

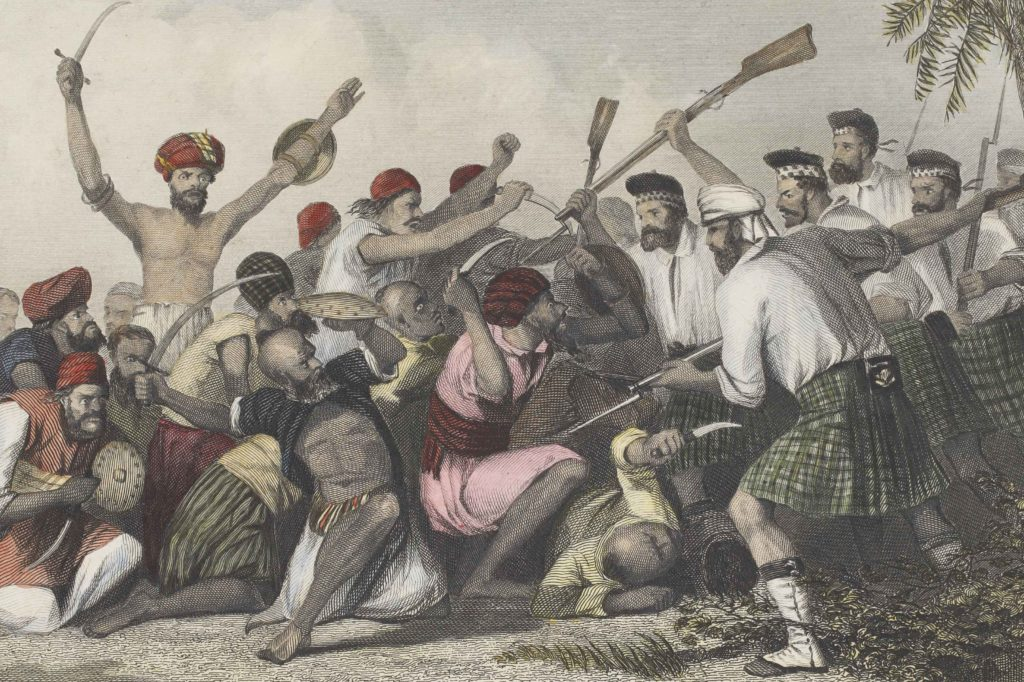
‘Conflict with the Ghazees before Bareilly’, 1857

The Indian Rebellion of 1857 started when a group of sepoys rebelled against the introduction of rifle cartridges that were allegedly greased with pig or beef fat. This offended both Muslim soldiers, who did not eat pork and Hindu soldiers, who did not eat beef. The uprising spread rapidly in the surrounding areas of Delhi against the British.

With the outbreak of the mutiny in Bareilly, Subedar Bahadur Khan had been acclaimed as general by the sepoys involved. When Bakht Khan heard of the rebellion in Meerut, he decided to march to Delhi to support the Mughal emperor Bahadur Shah Zafar's army. By the time Bakht Khan arrived at Delhi on 1 July 1857, with a large number of Rohilla sepoys, rebel forces had already taken the city and the Mughal ruler Bahadur Shah Zafar had been proclaimed Emperor of India. The Bareilly Brigade, led by Bakht Khan, included four regiments of Bengal Native Infantry, one of cavalry and a battery of artillery. The appearance of this substantial reinforcement, marching in good order, dismayed the British besieging Delhi and impressed Bahadur Shah Zafar. Bakht and his officers were quickly summoned to meet with the emperor.

The emperor's eldest son, Mirza Mughal, also known as Mirza Zahir-ud-Din, had been given the title of chief general, but this prince had no military experience. This was the moment when Bakht Khan, along with his forces, arrived in Delhi. With his arrival, the leadership position did improve. Bakht Khan's administrative abilities quickly became evident, and the emperor granted him actual authority and the title of Saheb-e-Alam Bahadur, or Lord Governor General. Khan was the virtual commander of sepoy forces, although Mirza Zahir-ud-Din was still the commander-in-chief.

Bakht Khan faced many problems which needed his immediate attention. The first and foremost problem was financial, to solve it he obtained from the emperor the authority to collect taxes. The second problem was the logistical one of supplies, which became more and more acute with the passage of time and even more so when British forces assaulted the city in September 1857. The British had many spies and agents in the city and were constantly pressuring Bahadur Shah to surrender. The situation around Delhi proceeded to deteriorate rapidly; Bakht Khan's leadership could not compensate for the rebels' lack of organization, supplies and military strength. Delhi was besieged by the British on 8 June 1857. On 14 September, the British captured the Kashmiri Gate and Bahadur Shah fled to the Tomb of Humayun before surrendering to the British (against Bakht Khan's pleas) on 20 September. The emperor was arrested, and his sons Mirza Abu Bakr, Mirza Khizr Sultan, and Mirza Mughal were executed by the British. In the aftermath of the city's capture, the victorious troops sacked the city for several days before order was eventually restored.

Bakht Khan himself left Delhi and joined rebel forces in Lucknow and Shahjahanpur. Later, Bahadur Shah Zafar was tried on the charges of treason and exiled to Rangoon in Burma where he died in 1862.

== Death ==
After being forced out of Delhi, he was mortally wounded by the British in the last days of the mutiny and died in the Terai plains of Nepal in 1859 which he is said to have entered along with Begum Hazrat Mahal in 1858/1859 after Awadh came under British control.

An unnamed tomb in the graveyard of Nanser village in Buner District of Khyber Pakhtunkhwa in Pakistan has been apocryphally claimed by local historians to be that of Khan, who say that he came to the region after the war was lost and spent the rest of his life under the protection of Akhund of Swat.
