= Battle of Badli-ki-Serai =

Battle of the Indian Rebellion of 1857

- Part of the Indian rebellion of 1857 and Anglo-Indian wars
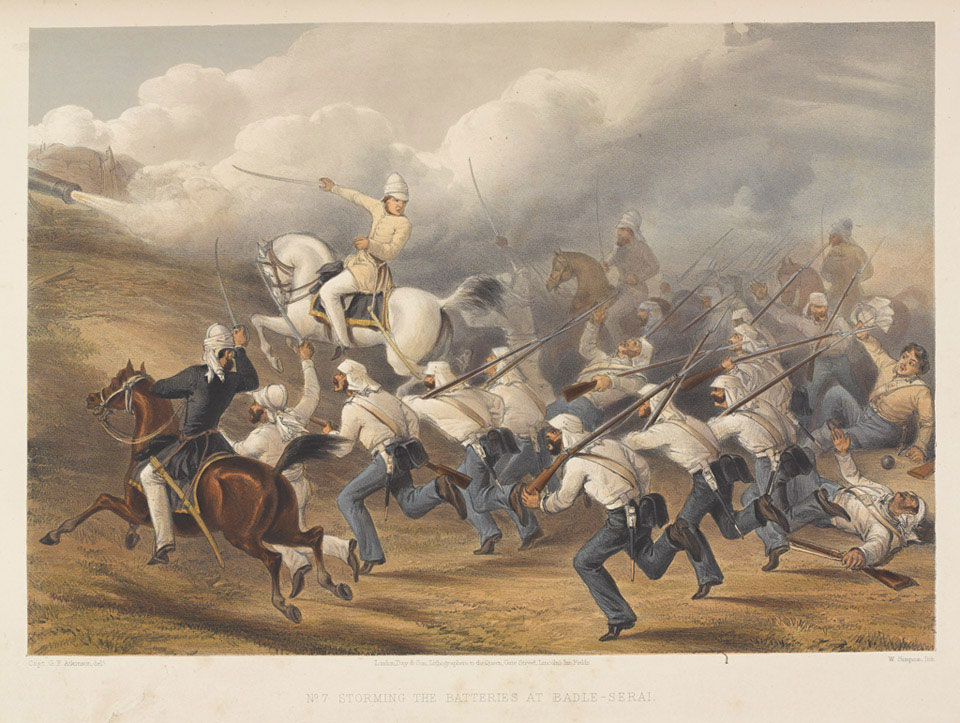
- Storming the Batteries at Badle-Serai, as sketched by Captain George Franklin Atkinson
Date	8 June 1857
Location	Near Delhi, India, close by Adarsh Nagar metro station at the Gateways of Badli Ki Sarai 28°43′08″N 77°10′03″E
Result	Company victory

Belligerents
East India Company	Mughal Empire

Commanders and leaders
Henry W. Barnard	Mirza Mughal (absent); Mirza Khizr Sultan

Strength
2,000 infantry 500 cavalry 22 guns	Approx. 9,000 infantry Approx. 400 cavalry 30 guns

Casualties and losses
51 killed 131 wounded	Approx. 1,000; 13 guns

The Battle of Badli-ki-Serai was fought early in the Indian Rebellion of 1857 as it has since been termed in Indian histories of the events. A British and Gurkha force defeated a force of sepoys who had rebelled against the British East India Company. The British victory enabled them to besiege and ultimately capture Delhi.

== Outbreak of the Rebellion ==
Tension between the East India Company and the sepoys (Indian soldiers) of its Bengal Army had been growing for several years, and increased rapidly during 1857. The rebellion finally broke out when the Company attempted to introduce a new Enfield rifle. The cartridges for this were believed by the sepoys to be greased with beef and pork fat. A Hindu soldier who bit the cartridge open to load the rifle would lose caste, and a Muslim soldier would be defiled. The sepoys believed that the company was attempting to force them to become Christians.

The first revolt occurred on 10 May at Meerut, 60 miles (97 km) north-west of Delhi, initiated by the 3rd Bengal Light Cavalry, composed mainly of Indian Muslims. After killing many of their British officers and some civilians, three regiments of Bengal infantry and cavalry marched to Delhi. When the first of them arrived on 11 May, they called on the three Bengal infantry regiments there to join them, and for the Mughal Emperor, Bahadur Shah II to lead them. By the end of the day, Delhi was in rebel hands, and news of the rebellion was spreading rapidly over northern India.

== British moves ==
Most of the units of the British Army in India, and the "European" units of the Bengal Army, were in the "hill stations" in the foothills of the Himalayas. At Simla, the Commander in Chief, General Anson, began collecting a force to recapture Delhi. Although aged, Anson nevertheless acted swiftly, but was handicapped by lack of transport and supplies. He succeeded in collecting a force at Ambala on 17 May, and they began advancing to Karnal, where most of the British civilians who had escaped from Delhi were taking shelter. On the way, his men indiscriminately hanged or blew from the guns, many suspected rebels or sympathisers.

Another small British force was advancing from Meerut to meet Anson. It was commanded by Major-General W. Hewitt, whose health had been broken by his age and many years' service in India. He eventually had to hand over command to Brigadier Archdale Wilson.

On 30 May, some Indian forces from Delhi attacked Wilson's force at the Hindon river. Wilson's infantry, the 60th Rifles, made good use of their Enfield rifles to drive the Indians from the field and capture five light guns. The rebels tried another attack the next day and were again driven back, though they lost no more of their artillery.

== The battle ==
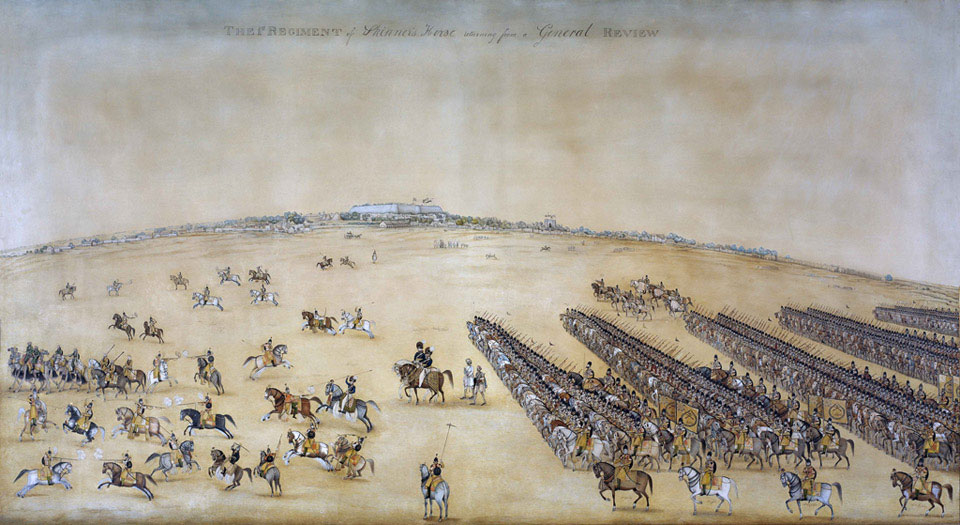
Indian Muslim irregular cavalry of Skinner's Horse

General Anson had died of cholera at Karnal on 27 May. He was succeeded by Major-General Sir Henry Barnard, who had recently fought in the Crimean War. Barnard's force advanced to join with Wilson's at Alipur (north-west of Delhi) on 1 June. The combined force advanced along the Grand Trunk road towards Delhi.

The rebel sepoy regiments had dug in at Badli-ki-Serai to oppose their advance. Their strength was estimated in some works as 30,000, but was put closer to 4,000 by historian A.H. Amin. This number includes the sepoy regiments only, who were probably accompanied onto the battlefield by irregular contingents from Delhi, and scavengers and sight-seers, making effective numbers difficult to estimate although the historian Saul David stated the rebel force numbered about 9,000 and thirty guns.

The rebels' right flank, with most of their artillery, occupied a serai (a walled enclosure) and a village, also surrounded by a wall. Their left flank consisted of a "sandbagged" battery. Both flanks were supposedly protected also by areas of marshy ground. On the left however, there was a gap of a mile between the end of the swamp and the Western Jumna canal, which was not defended. The right flank was similarly vulnerable.

When the British advanced against this position early on 8 June, they suffered high casualties from the rebel artillery, which was heavier than most of the British guns and well-handled. Barnard sent his cavalry under Colonel James Hope Grant to outflank the rebel left and a brigade of infantry under Colonel Graves (temporarily replacing Brigadier Jones, who was ill) around the rebel right. As these forces began to threaten the enemy flanks and rear, Barnard ordered his other brigade under Colonel Showers (which included a Gurkha regiment) to charge and capture the enemy artillery with the bayonet. There was severe fighting for the village and serai, but the rebels fled to avoid being surrounded, abandoning thirteen guns.

The sepoys retreated to Delhi in disorder, and some of the citizens thought that the British would follow close on their heels and capture the city before resistance could be organised. The British were too exhausted by the heat and their exertions however, and contented themselves with occupying Delhi Ridge north of the city. This led to a costly siege lasting three and a half months, but the city was eventually stormed and the rebels were defeated.

== Results ==
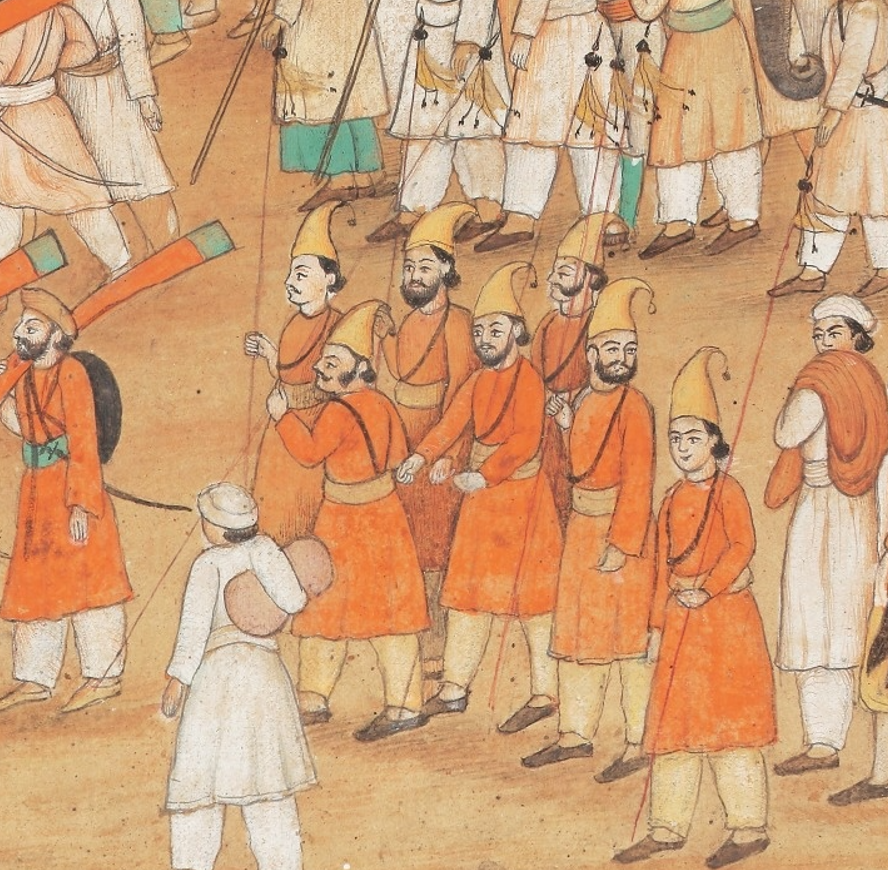
Mughal court guards under British rule

The battle had exposed the rebels' weaknesses, the most damaging of which was their lack of competent leaders. Bahadur Shah had nominated his son Mirza Mughal as commander-in-chief of his army, but the sepoys treated him and the King disrespectfully. Mirza Mughal was preoccupied with the administration of Delhi, and showed himself to be most unwilling to lead a force to attack Meerut or confront Barnard. He had not been present at the battle, and later issued a rather fatuous statement that "...as a castle in the game of chess, he was firmly seated beyond all fear of check being given."

The sepoys' officers had attained rank by seniority only and none of them proved to be gifted generals, as opposed to platoon commanders. At Badli-ki-Serai they deployed no forces to protect against outflanking moves and left themselves no reserves. The sepoys refused to use the Enfield rifle (for which they lacked ammunition in any case), and were forced to use the Brown Bess, which was far less accurate than the Enfield rifle (some of the British units at Badli-ki-Serai also had the Brown Bess, but its short range and inaccuracy hampered the defenders more than the attackers).
