= Mirza Shah Abbas =

Mughal prince (1845–1910)

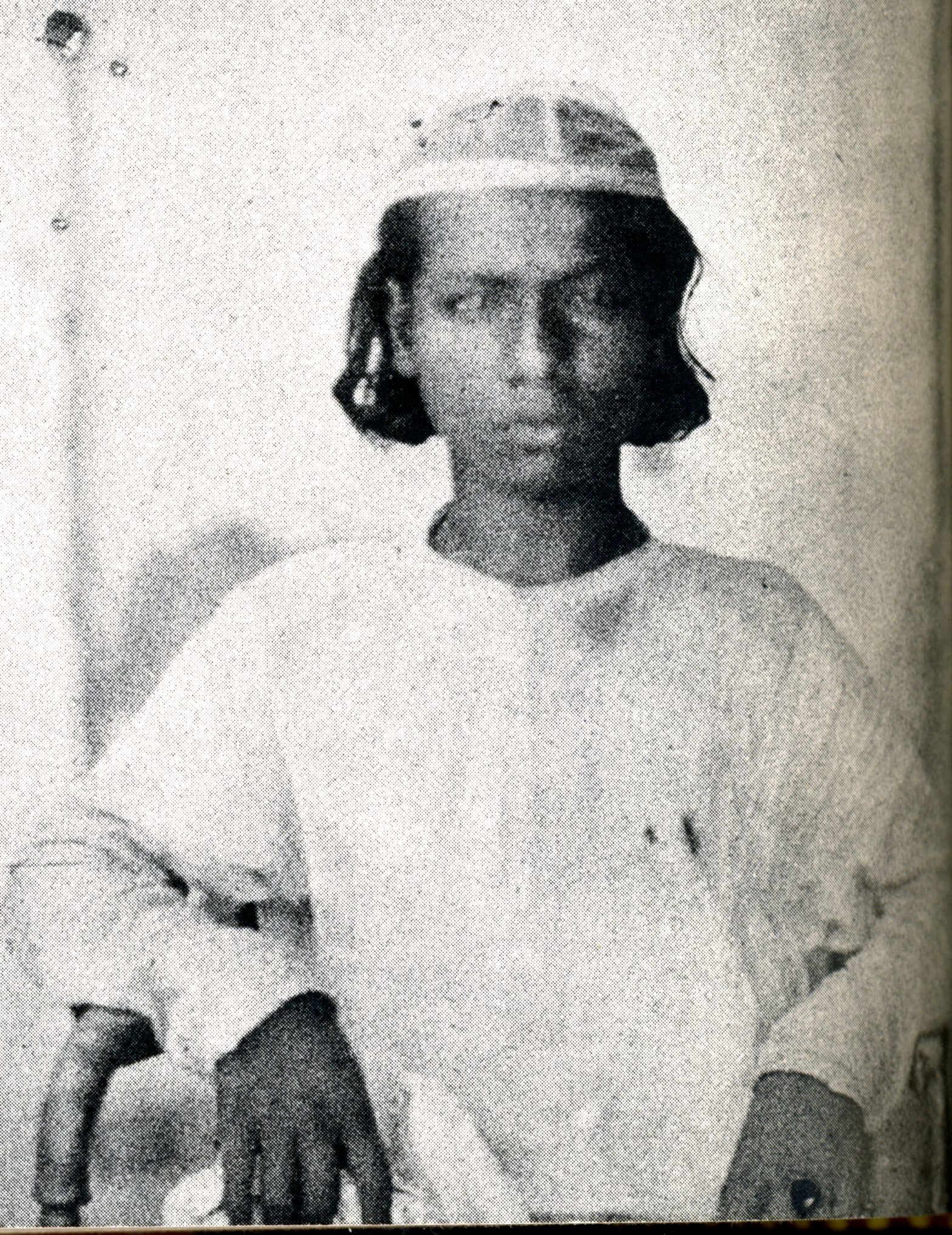
- Photograph of Mirza Shah Abbas
- Born: 1845; Red Fort, Delhi, Mughal Kingdom
- Died: 25 December 1910 (aged 64–65); Rangoon, Burma Province, British Raj
- Spouses: Aisha Begum; Jumma Bibi; Husaini Bibi; Said Bibi
- Issue: Mirza Muhammad Muazzim; Mirza Muhammad Akhtar; Mirza Muhammad Rahmat; Mirza Muhammad Bidar Bakht; Bilqis Zamani Begum; Shamim Akhtar
Names
- Shahzada Mirza Shah Abbas Bahadur
- House: Mughal
- Father: Bahadur Shah Zafar
- Mother: Mubarak-un-Nissa Begum
- Religion: Islam

Mirza Shah Abbas Bahadur (1845 – 25 December 1910) was son of the last Mughal Emperor Bahadur Shah Zafar. He was a younger brother of Prince Mirza Mughal and former Crown Princes Mirza Dara Bakht, Mirza Jawan Bakht, and Mirza Fath-ul-Mulk Bahadur.
