= Mirza Tahir =

Mirza Tahir may refer to:

- Mirza Tahir Ahmad (1928–2003), fourth leader of the Ahmadiyya Muslim Community
- Mirza Tahir Hussain (born 1970), British man who spent 18 years on death row in Pakistan
- Mirza Ulugh Tahir (1830–1857), Mughal prince

== See also ==
- Tahir Mirza (1936–2007), Pakistani journalist
- Mirza Tahir, Punjab, a village in Pakistan
