= Mirza Abu Bakr =

Mirza Abu Bakr may refer to:

- Abu Bakr Shah
- Mirza Abu Bakr Dughlat
- Mirza Abu Bakr (Mughal prince) (1837–1857)
- Mirza Abu Bakr bin Muhammad Juki, Governor of Balkh who lost his government to Ulugh Beg in 1447
