= Shahzada Muhammad Hidayat Afshar, Ilahi Bakhsh Bahadur =

Mirza Ilahi Baksh
- Mughal Prince

Head of Timurid Dynasty
- Reign: 1858 – 21 March 1878
- Predecessor: Bahadur Shah II
- Successor: Sulaiman Shah Bahadur
- Born: 1809; Delhi, Mughal Empire
- Died: 21 March 1878 (aged 68–69); Delhi, British India
Names
- Mirza Muhammad Hideyat Afza Ilahi Baksh ibn Mirza Muhammad Shuja'at Afza Bahadur
- House: Timurid Dynasty
- Dynasty: Mughal Dynasty
- Father: Shuja'at Afza Bahadur
- Mother: Khair un-nisa Begum
- Religion: Sunni Islam

Shahzada Muhammad Hideyat Afza or, in short Mirza Ilahi Baksh (1809 – 21 March 1878), the 23rd head of the Mughal Dynasty, was born in Delhi in the reign of Akbar Shah II, the son of Mirza Muhammad Shuja'at Afza Bahadur (c.1750 – 1833), Mirza Ilahi Baksh as lineages he was a great-great-great-great-grandson in a direct male line from Bahadur Shah I; as well, through his paternal grandmother Nawab Umdat us-Zamani Begum Sahiba, he was a great-grandson of Alamgir II.

Little is known of his early life. During the First War of Independence of India at 1857, he assisted the British forces in their efforts, provided intelligence on the activities of the revolutionaries, attempted to save Christians caught in the fighting and organised the peaceful surrender of Bahadur Shah II. For his services, Muhammad Hideyat Afza was given the title of Chief Representative and Head of the Royal House of Timur in 1858, along with the title of Shahzada and a pension of Rs.22,830. He was granted a jagir of several villages in Delhi and Meerut districts three years later-a far cry from the vast empire his ancestors had ruled. In India and Pakistan, he is widely seen as "traitor". He died in his seventieth year on 21 March 1878.

== Family ==
Shahzada Muhammad Hideyat Afza had 8 wives, by whom he had three sons (by his first wife Abadi Begum) and three daughters:

- Sarwar Sultan Begum Sahiba (1837–1875); married, one daughter.
- Mah Siti Begum Sahiba (1839–1920); married, one son.
- Shahzada Muhammad Sulaiman Shah Bahadur - 24th Head of the Mughal Dynasty
- Shahzada Muhammad Kaiwan Shah Gorkwani - 25th Head of the Mughal Dynasty
- Mirza Muhammad Iqbal Shah Bahadur (1858–1892)
