= Mirza Quraish Shikoh =

Mughal emperor

Shahzada Mirza Muhammad Quaish Shikoh Baig (c. 1820 – c. 1889) also known as Mirza Quaish Shikoh (Muhammed Baig) was a son of Mughal emperor Bahadur Shah II and Moti Bai.

Mirza Quaish was one of 49 children of Bahadur Shah II, and the only one to survive the Indian Rebellion of 1857. During the rebellion, Mirza Quaish escaped the recapture of Delhi by the British and fled to Kathmandu. Subsequently, he escaped from Delhi and came to Udaipur, in the province of Rajasthan, where the Maharana of Mewar granted him a small subsistence pension, on the request of a eunuch. Mirza Quaish later moved to Aurangabad, where he later died.

He had a son named Shahzada Mirza Abdullah Baig, who was given shelter in Hyderabad and married the daughter of chief Qazi (Islamic judge) of Amrabad province (Maryam Begum). They had a son, Mirza Muhammed Jaffer Baig. His descendants still live in Hyderabad.
