= Mirza Suhrab Hindi =

Shahzada Mirza Sultan Muhammad Suhrab Hindi Bahadur (c. 1820 – c. 1889) also known as Mirza Mendhu Sahib was a son of Mughal emperor Bahadur Shah II and Moti Bai.

After the Indian Mutiny 1857–1858, he became a dervish (Sufi aspirant) in Udaipur where the Maharana of Mewar granted him a small subsistence pension.
