= Akhtar Mahal =

Consort of Mughal emperor Bahadur Shah II

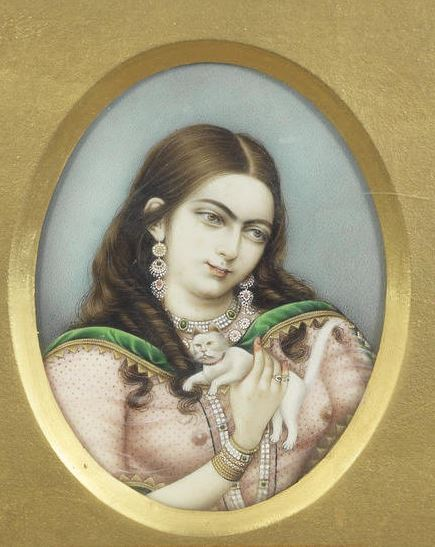
- Portrait of Akhtar Mahal, c. mid 19th century
- Born: Man Bai Shahjahanabad, Delhi, Mughal Empire
- Died: Delhi, Mughal Empire
- Spouse: Bahadur Shah Zafar (m. 1847, d. 1862)
- House: Timurid (by marriage)

Akhtar Mahal was a consort of Mughal emperor Bahadur Shah Zafar. She was a notable tawaif (a courtesan singer‚ dancer‚ and poet) before she became a consort.

== Life ==
Akhtar Mahal was born as Man Bai, and came from humble origins. She hailed from a tawaif family, and entered the palace as a dancer and singer. She soon became the favorite of Bahadur Shah Zafar, and she eventually became his consort when he married her.

The wedding took place in 1847, on the festival of Raksha Bandhan and was celebrated with great fanfare and grandeur. On the occasion, the Emperor gave a gift of 550 rupees to Raja Bhola Nath and gifted one gold coin each to his mounted guards. Man Bai was given the title of Akhtar Mahal (lit. "The Star of the Palace") with the Emperor ordering that a seal bearing her name be made. She was gifted precious jewellery, granted a stipend of 200 rupees, and a eunuch posted as her guard.

Following the fall of the Mughal Empire, Bahadur Shah Zafar was exiled to Rangoon (modern day Yangon, Myanmar) in 1857. He was accompanied by only one of his consorts, Zeenat Mahal.

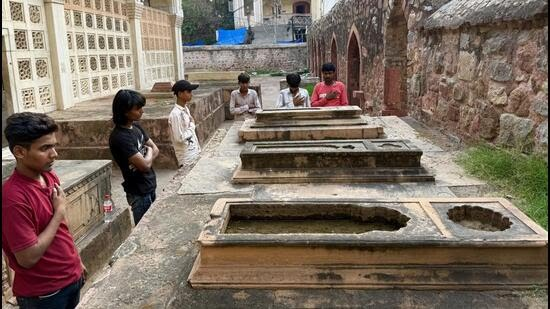
The graves of Akhtar Mahal, Ashraf Mahal, and Taj Mahal Begum, Chausath Khamba.

Akhtar Mahal and all the rest of the remaining consorts and concubines were left in turbulent Delhi, with their futures uncertain. After her death, she was buried in the precincts of the Chausat Khamba, Nizamuddin Basti, near the shrine of Nizamuddin Auliya alongside Ashraf Mahal and Taj Mahal Begum.
