= Mirza Ulugh Tahir =

Mughal prince (1830-1857)

- Born: 1830; Delhi, Mughal Kingdom, India
- Died: 13 October 1857 (aged 27); Delhi, Mughal Kingdom, India
- Cause of death: Execution
- Parents: Bahadur Shah II (father); Afzal-un-Nissa Khanum (mother)

Shahzada Mirza Ulugh Tahir Bahadur (1830 – 13 October 1857), also known as Mirza Mehdi Sahib, was a son of the Mughal emperor Bahadur Shah II and Afzal-un-Nissa Khanum. He was killed (executed) at Delhi, 13 October 1857 after the Indian Rebellion of 1857 led by his father failed.
