= Mirza Mughal =

Prince of the Mughal Empire

- Shahzada; Mirza; Prince of the Mughal Empire
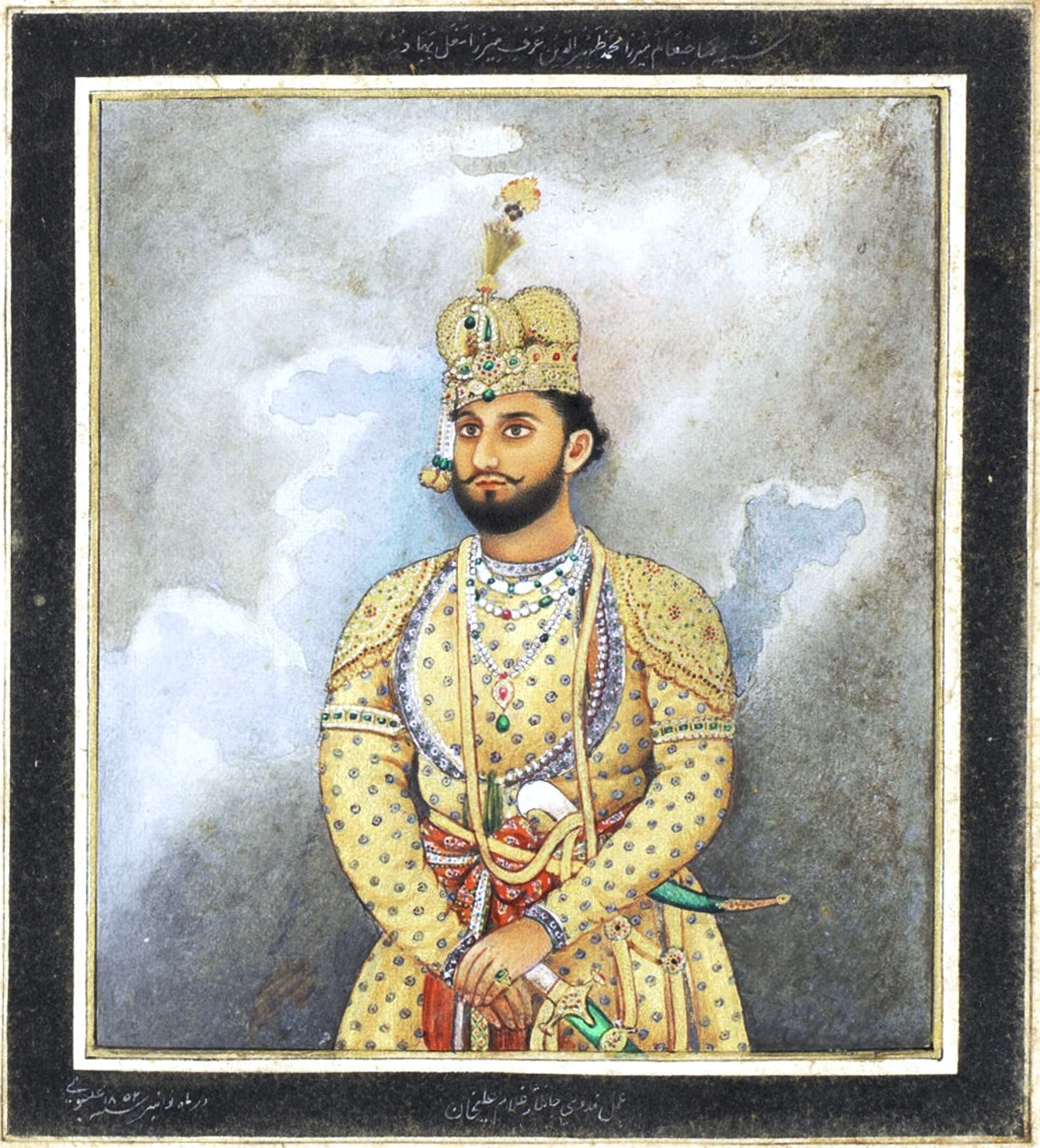
- Mirza Mughal, son of the last Mughal emperor Bahadur Shah Zafar
- Born: 1817; Red Fort, Old Delhi, Mughal Empire
- Died: 23 September, 1857 (aged 39–40); Old Delhi, Mughal Empire
- House: Mughal
- Father: Bahadur Shah Zafar
- Mother: Sharafat Mahal
- Religion: Sunni Islam

Mirza Mughal, born Muhammad Zahir ud-din Mirza (1817 – 23 September 1857), was a Mughal prince. He played a significant role during the Indian Rebellion of 1857. He was one of the Mughal princes shot dead at one of the gates of Old Delhi, which gate thereafter came to be known as "Khooni Darwaza" (lit. 'bloody gate' or 'murder gate').

== Early life ==
Mirza Mughal was the fifth son of Bahadur Shah Zafar, the 20th and last Mughal emperor. His mother, Sharafat Mahal Sayyidini, came from an aristocratic Sayyid family that claimed descent from Muhammad. His mother was descended from Abdullah Shah Ghazi who was from the Hasanid line of the Ahl al-Bayt. Following the death in 1856 of his elder step-brother Mirza Fakhru, Mirza Mughal became the eldest surviving legitimately born son of Bahadur Shah Zafar. However, the British refused to recognize anybody as heir to the throne of Delhi, and indicated that the monarchy would be abolished following Zafar's death.

== War of 1857 ==
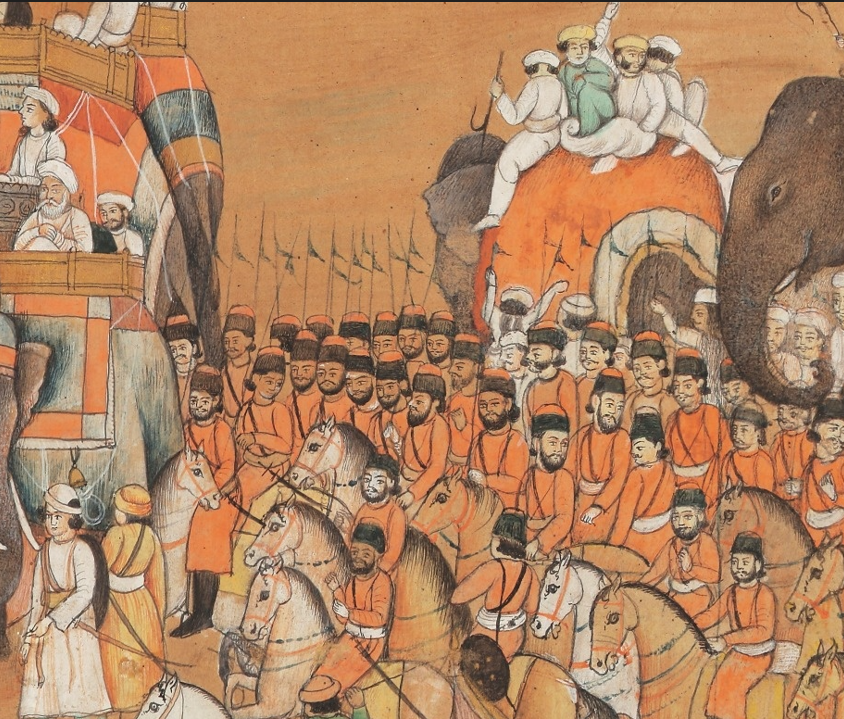
Painting of Cavalry in Durbar Procession of Mughal Emperor Akbar II under the British governor Charles Metcalfe

In May 1857, sepoys in the service of the East India Company rebelled against their British officers and streamed into Delhi. They made straight for the palace, apprised the Emperor of their grievances against their British superiors, affirmed their allegiance to him, and sought sanctuary and leadership. A few days later, after taking stock of the situation, Mirza Mughal and some of his half-brothers petitioned their father to be appointed in charge of the rebel troops. Their plea was initially refused but later granted, and Mirza Mughal, as the senior-most legitimate prince, was designated commander-in-chief. Though the emperor seems to have opposed the cold-blooded killing of the European prisoners, the princes also seem to have been involved in the act. Mirza Mughal had absolutely no training or experience for his new office. However, he energetically sought to organize the troops, make arrangements for their billeting and provisioning, and bring a semblance of order to the edgy city. His inexperience soon became apparent, and he was upstaged a few weeks later by the arrival of a large force of mutineers from Bareilly, led by Bakht Khan, formerly an Indian officer (Subedar) in the service of the East India Company. Bakht Khan had earned a reputation as an artillery officer during the Afghan wars. Shortly after his arrival, the emperor appointed Bakht Khan commander-in-chief and left Mirza Mughal as adjutant-general in charge of supplies. One of Bakht's first acts was to tell the Emperor that if any of the royal princes attempted to plunder Delhi, he would cut off their noses and ears. A few weeks later, following another reshuffle of offices, Mirza Mughal was given charge of administering the city of Delhi. On 1 September, at a durbar in Delhi, officers of the rebel army made complaints that Mirza Mughal and his brother Mirza Khizr Sultan had taken several lakhs of rupees from the people of the city and had passed nothing of this on to the army. Demands were made for this sum to be surrendered and the princes be imprisoned. The officers were promised their pay within two weeks and they returned to their regiments.

== Capture ==
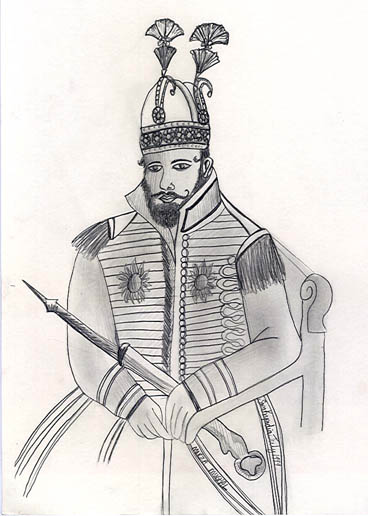
Mirza Mughal in military uniform

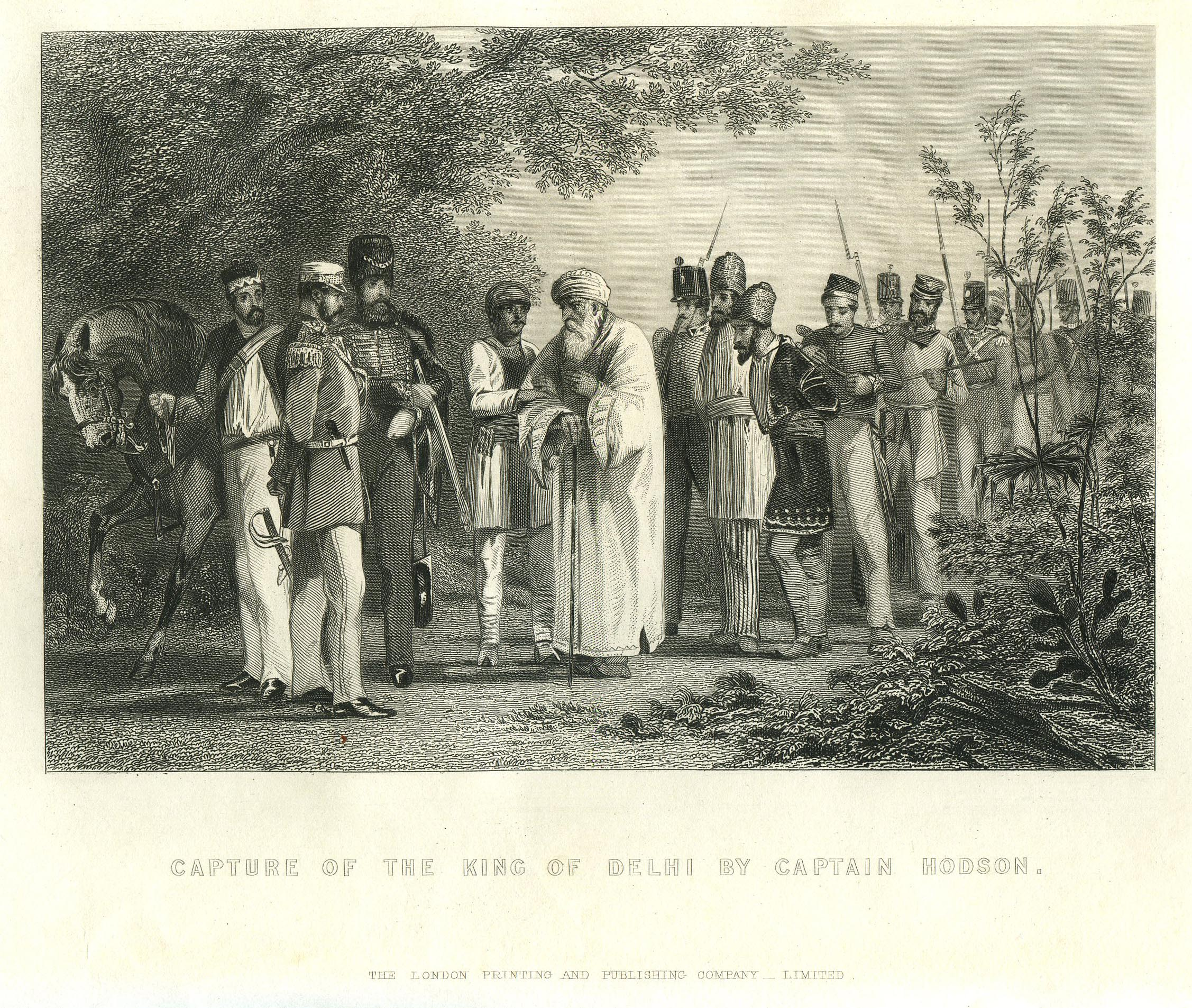
Capture of the King and his sons by Captain Hodson

By the middle of September 1857, the disorganized rebellion had run its course as far as the city of Delhi was concerned. British forces had reclaimed control of the areas surrounding Delhi and were massed on the ridge overlooking the city for a final assault on the city, which was being rapidly abandoned by its citizens, who fled mainly to their villages in the countryside. As the British took control of the city, Emperor Bahadur Shah II (aged 82) left the Red Fort and took refuge in Humayun’s Tomb, which at that time lay outside Delhi. With him were Mirza Mughal and two other princes (Mirza Khizr, and a grandson, Mirza Abu Bakr). Their whereabouts was reported by spies to Major Hodson, who sent them a message saying that the party had no hope of escape and should surrender. They refused to surrender.

The next morning, Hodson went to the tomb with one hundred Indian sowars (cavalrymen) and demanded the unconditional surrender of the Emperor and princes. The situation became known to people of nearby villages, and a substantial crowd gathered, many of whom were equipped with whatever arms (farm-knives, sickles and axes) they normally kept. Resistance at this point was never the plan of the Emperor, who had come to the tomb of his illustrious forebear to pray and grieve, and perhaps in the hope that the sanctity of the tomb would provide a sanctuary for himself and his surviving family. Hodson sent two Indian aides (Rajab Ali and Ilahe Bakhsh) into the garden tomb to negotiate with the Emperor. Bahadur Shah sent a response to Hodson offering the surrender of his immediate party on condition that his life would be spared. Hodson explicitly agreed to this.

Agreement being reached, the Emperor, trusting to the word of Hodson as a British officer, emerged from the tomb and exchanged greetings in person with Hodson. Finding the old man extremely frail with exertion, Hodson told the Emperor to rest under a shady tree and accept refreshments. The Emperor was then sent back to Delhi, carried in a palanquin with an escort of Sikh sowars from Hodson's Horse. Meanwhile, the remaining ninety troopers collected the arms of the motley crowd of villagers, jihadis and courtiers, who surrendered their weaponry without dissent at the bidding of their Emperor.

== Death ==
Shortly afterwards, with the Emperor secured but clearly in no condition to be transported to the city, Hodson set out for the city with a small party of troopers. Riding on horses, they soon caught up with the party of just ten sowars escorting the princes. As they approached the gates of the city, Hodson found that a crowd of townsmen had gathered in the expectation of witnessing the return of the Emperor and the princes. Also, a crowd of curious villagers and armed civilians had followed in the wake of the Princes as they travelled the few miles to the gates of Delhi.

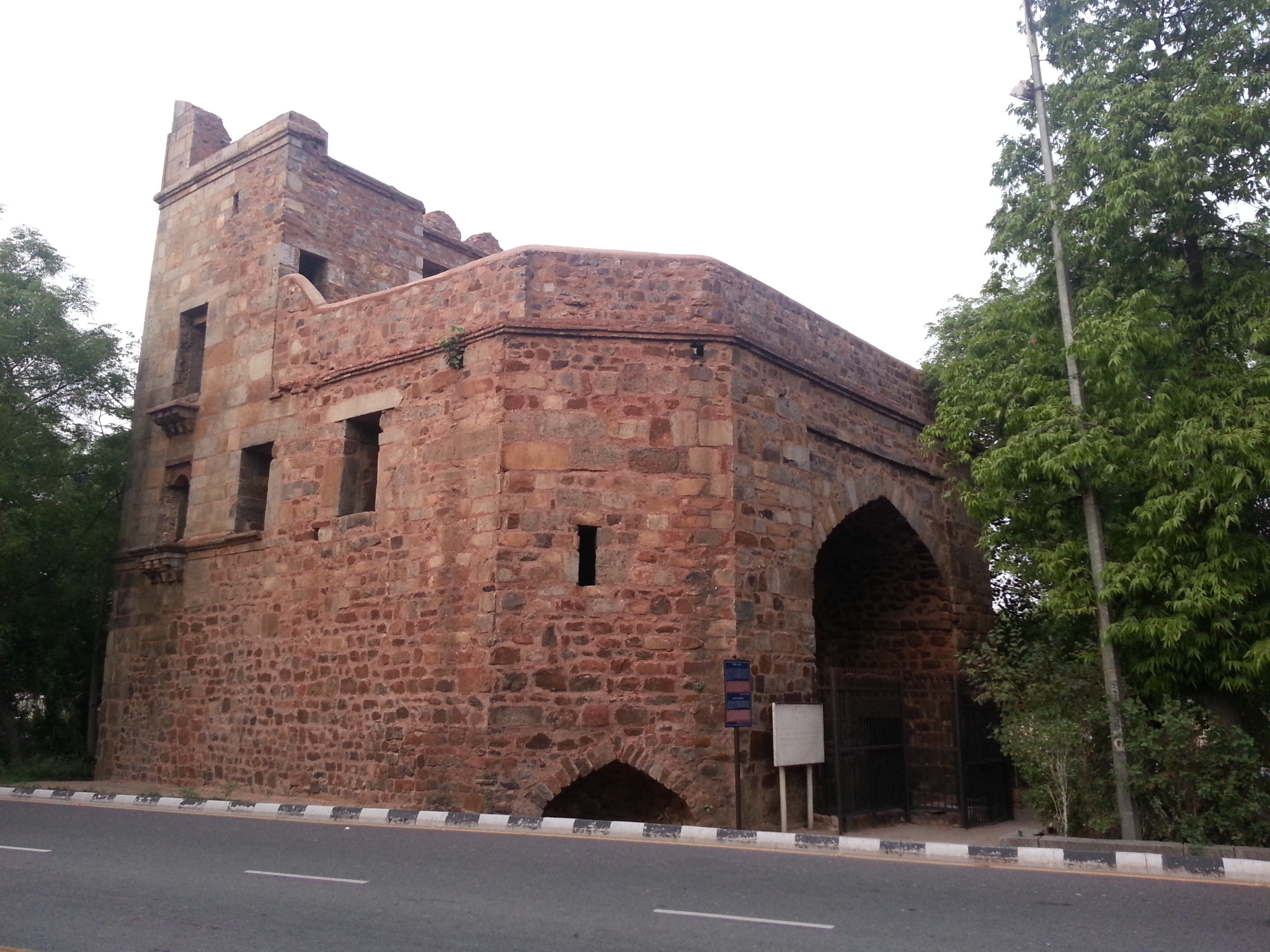
Khooni Darwaza where Mirza Mughal was killed.

At the city gate, Hodson ordered the three princes to get off the cart. In Hodson's own words, "I came up just in time, as a large crowd had collected and were turning on the guard. I rode among them at a gallop, and in a few words appealed to the crowd, saying that these were the butchers who had murdered and brutally used helpless women and children, and that the Government had now sent their punishment: seizing a carbine from one of my men, I deliberately shot them one after another." After killing the princes, Hodson personally stripped their bodies of jewellery: their signet rings, turquoise arm-bands and bejewelled swords. He pocketed these valuables as trophies of war, although they had been obtained by killing disarmed prisoners of war under dubious circumstances. The bodies of the three princes were thrown back into the bullock-cart, taken to a kotwali (police-station) within the city, thrown on the ground in front of that building and left exposed there for all to see. The gate near which the executions were performed became known as Khooni Darwaza, meaning "Bloody Gate" or "Murder Gate." Hodson was forced to give up the plundered jewellery, but retained one sword. Reaction in British circles to the summary executions was mixed and Hodson's reputation suffered as a result.

== Bibliography ==
- William Dalrymple, The Last Mughal: The Fall of a Dynasty: Delhi, 1857 published by Penguin, 2006, ISBN 978-1408800928
- David, Saul (2002) The Indian Mutiny, 1857, Viking, Penguin Group, London ISBN 0-670-91137-2
- Parvez, Aslam (2017) The Life & Poetry of Bahadur Shah Zafar, Hay House ISBN 978-93-85827-48-8
