= Khooni Darwaza =

Gate in Delhi, India

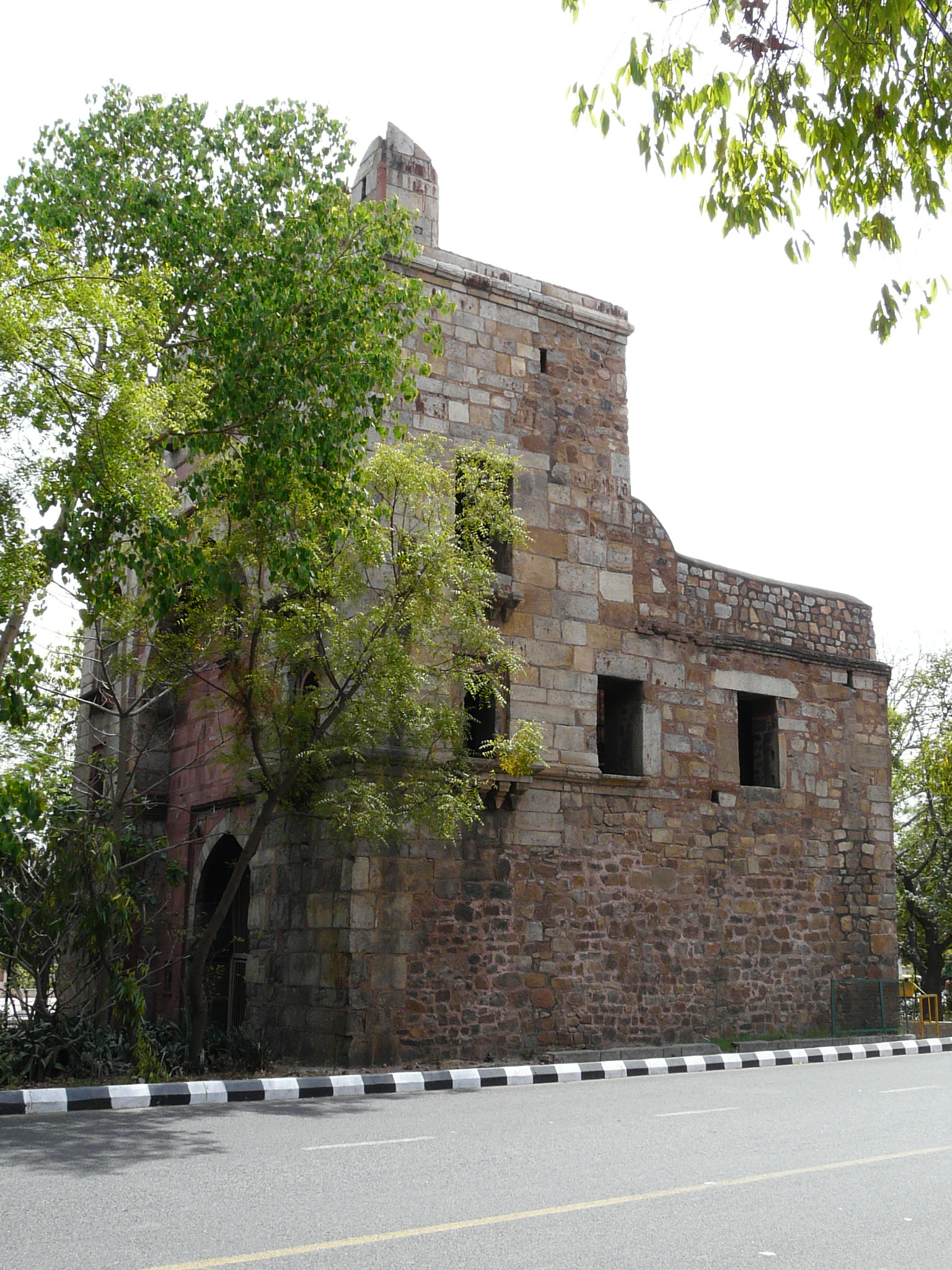
- Khooni Darwaza
- Interactive map of the Khooni Darwaza area

General information
- Architectural style: Mughal-Afghan
- Location: Delhi, India
- Coordinates: 28.636°N 77.241°E

External image
- Painting of the Khooni Darwaza

Khooni Darwaza (Hindi: खूनी दरवाज़ा, Urdu: خونی دروازہ literally Bloody Gate), also referred to as Lal Darwaza (Hindi: लाल दरवाज़ा, Red Gate) was initially called as Kabuli Darwaza, The gate is located near Delhi Gate, on the Bahadur Shah Zafar Marg in Delhi, India. It is one of the 13 surviving gates in Delhi. It is just south of the fortified Old Delhi and was constructed by Sher Shah Suri.

== Location ==
Khooni Darwaza was situated on an open tract of land before the rise of modern buildings around it. It lies today on the Bahadur Shah Zafar Marg opposite the Arun Jaitley cricket ground, which lies to its east. To the west is the entrance to the Maulana Azad Medical College. It lies about half a kilometre to the south of the Delhi Gate of Old Delhi.

== History ==
- Emperor Jahangir who succeeded his father Akbar to the throne, was opposed by some of Akbar's Navaratnas. He ordered that two sons of Abdul Rahim Khan-I-Khana, one of the Navratnas, be executed at the Khooni Darwaza. Their bodies were left to rot at the gate.
- Aurangzeb (Shah Jahan's son) defeated his elder brother Dara Shikoh in the struggle for the throne and had his head displayed at the gate.
- The gate is supposed to have seen bloodshed in 1739 when Delhi was ransacked by Nadir Shah of Persia. However, this is also disputed - according to some sources, this massacre occurred at another gate of the same name located in the Dariba locality of Chandni Chowk.
- A few stories also refer to the place being called Khooni Darwaza during the Mughal reign but there is no record of any mention of the name before 1857.

=== Killing of Mughal princes ===
The Khooni Darwaza (Bloody Gate) is first found by name in history after three princes of the Mughal dynasty - Bahadur Shah Zafar's sons Mirza Mughal and Mirza Khizr Sultan and grandson Mirza Abu Bakht, were shot by a British officer, Major William Hodson, before the war of independence. Hodson obtained the surrender of the Emperor, and the next day asked for an unconditional surrender from the three princes at Humayun's Tomb. Hodson arrested about 16 members of the Emperor's family and was transporting them from Humayun's Tomb in a bullock cart accompanied by a detachment of 100 "sowars" (Indian cavalrymen in the British service). On reaching this gate, he was stopped and surrounded by thousands of Muslims, with white cloth tied on their foreheads (a symbol for the shroud) Jehadis or Ghazis. Hodson later recalled, "I was surrounded on all sides by Ghazis as far as my eyes could see." It is said that Hodson ordered the three to get down at the spot, stripped them of their jewelled swords and shot them dead at point blank range. The bodies were then taken away and put up for public display for three days in front of a Kotwali near Chandni Chowk.

The Khooni Darwaza was an archway at the time of the revolt of 1857 and not a gate in the traditional sense. It is often mistaken for the original Kabuli Gate of Old Delhi.

== Post-independence ==
During the riots of 1947, more bloodshed occurred near the gate when several refugees going to the camp established in Purana Qila were killed here.

Khooni Darwaza is today a protected monument under the aegis of the Archaeological Survey of India.

It gained more notoriety in November 2002 when a medical student was raped there by three youths. The incident sparked much uproar and was also discussed in the Parliament of India. Following the incident, the monument was sealed to the general public.

== Architecture ==
The gate is a mid-16th century construction during the reign of Sher Shah Suri. Its architectural features were typical of Afghan rule in Delhi under the Sur and Lodi empires, who were synonymous as they both championed Afghan-style architecture in India during this time. In this context, the term "Afghan" refers to patronage patterns, shared architectural forms, and construction practices rather than to a uniform style system. The gate is 15.5 m (50.9 ft) high and built with Delhi quartzite stone. Three staircases lead to three different levels of the gate.

The three-tiered structure is believed to have been a display board used to present the heads of offenders and enemies during Sher Shah Suri's time.

In building this site, Sher Shah Suri hoped to revive many of the administrative features of Alauddin Khaliji’s government, a previous Persian dynasty that ruled Delhi as part of the Delhi Sultanate. Architectural production during this period likewise drew upon earlier Sultanate precedents as part of a broader effort to restore Delhi’s political and symbolic prestige. Like Alauddin’s Alai Darwaza, the Khooni Darwaza utilizes contrasting colored stones on textured exterior surfaces.

Originally, the Khooni Darwaza likely formed a part of Sher Shah’s city walls, as early surveys note that masonry fortification walls one adjoined the gate (although no above-ground trace of those walls remain today). The structure of the Khooni Darwaza comprises three stories, each with a separate flight of stairs. Such vertical organization and emphasis on height were characteristic of Afghan-period defensive architecture, and provided different vantage points for soldiers as it served as a defensive military outpost.

Overall, the construction of the Khooni Darwaza displays a blended architecture of Afghan and early Mughal architectural features. Typical features of Afghan architecture include massive, height-emphasizing gates and structures built in local stone, and marked by plain pointed arches and minimal surface ornament. Meanwhile, typical Mughal architectural features include the use of red sandstone, white marble, and chhatris (canopies incorporating local Hindu architecture).

The Khooni Darwaza blends the two by combining the Afghan-style use of a massive gateway, and heavy, quartzite masonry (typical of Lodi and Sur construction) with the more refined Mughal construction of red-sandstone archways, ornamental openings, and detailing that exemplify the larger stylistic shift in 16th century Delhi.

However, Mughal architecture did not replace earlier Sultanate and Afghan forms immediately, as many architectural types developed under the Delhi Sultanate and Lodi rulers continued well into the early Mughal period. For example, mosques constructed during Babur’s reign followed established Lodi models, and octagonal tomb forms associated with Sultanate architecture remained in use into the mid-sixteenth century. During the time of the Khooni Darwaza, Afghan practice and emerging Mughal preference overlapped.

== Gallery ==
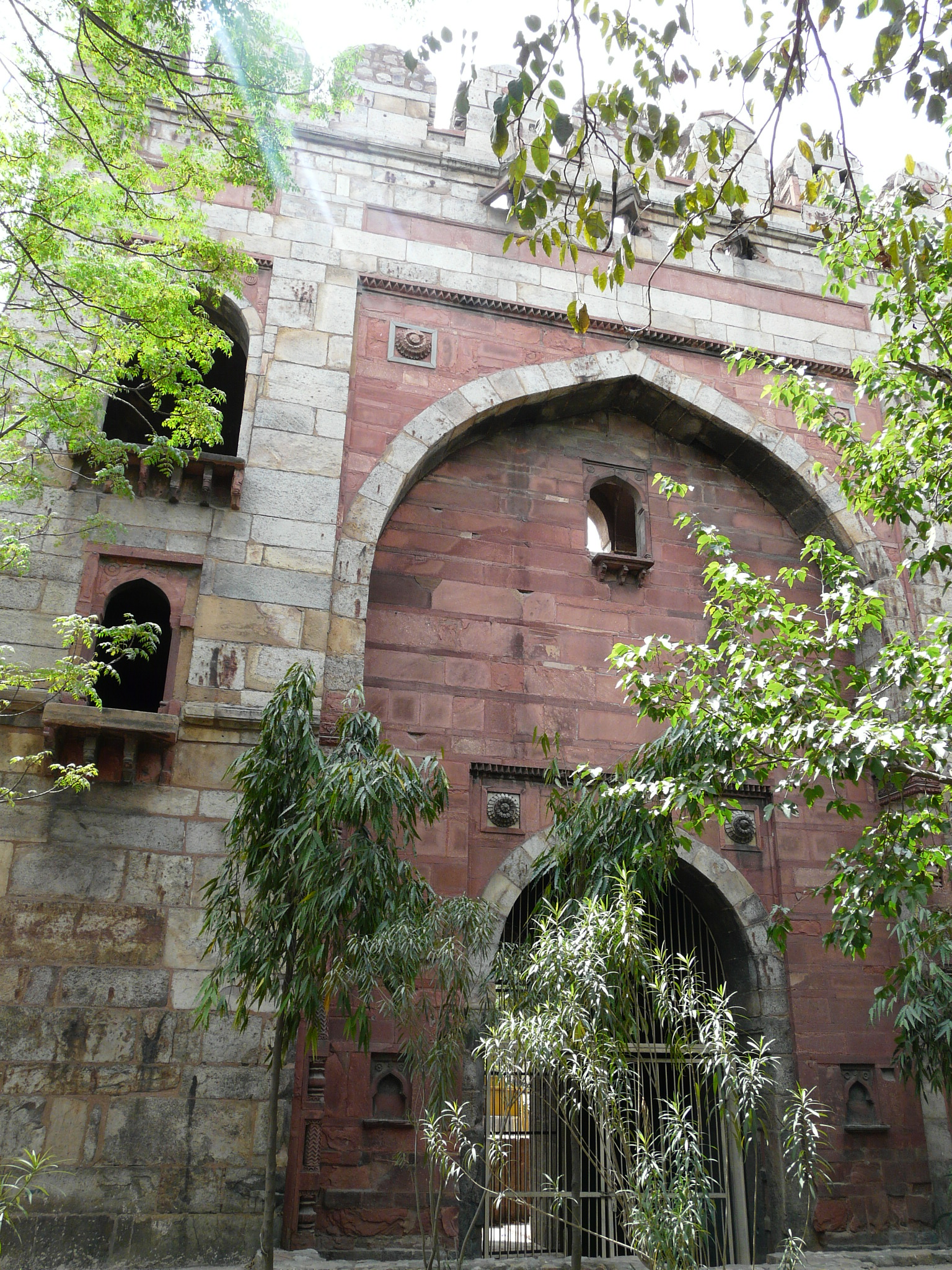
Khuni Darwaza Front view.

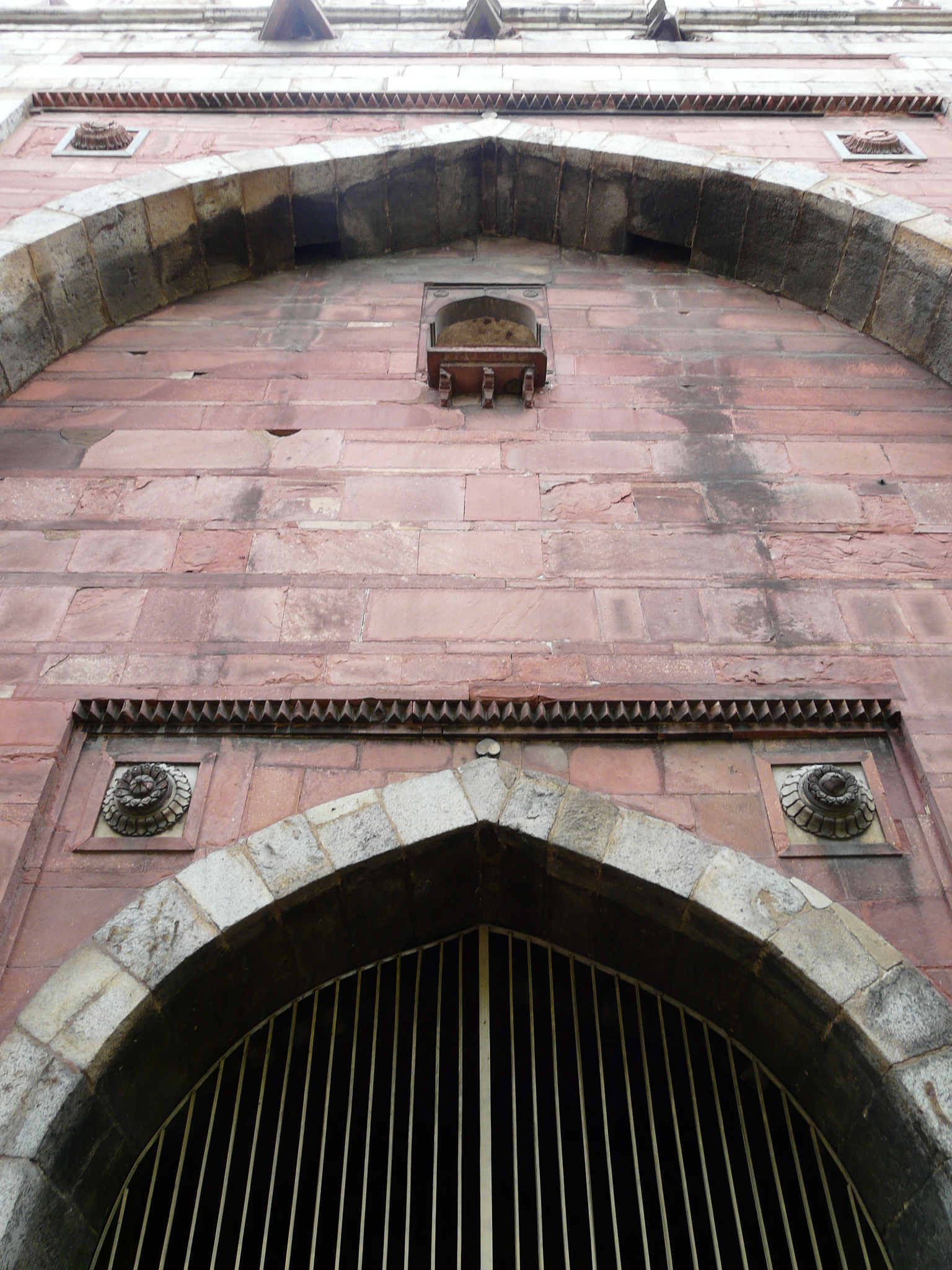
Khuni Darwaza front view, details

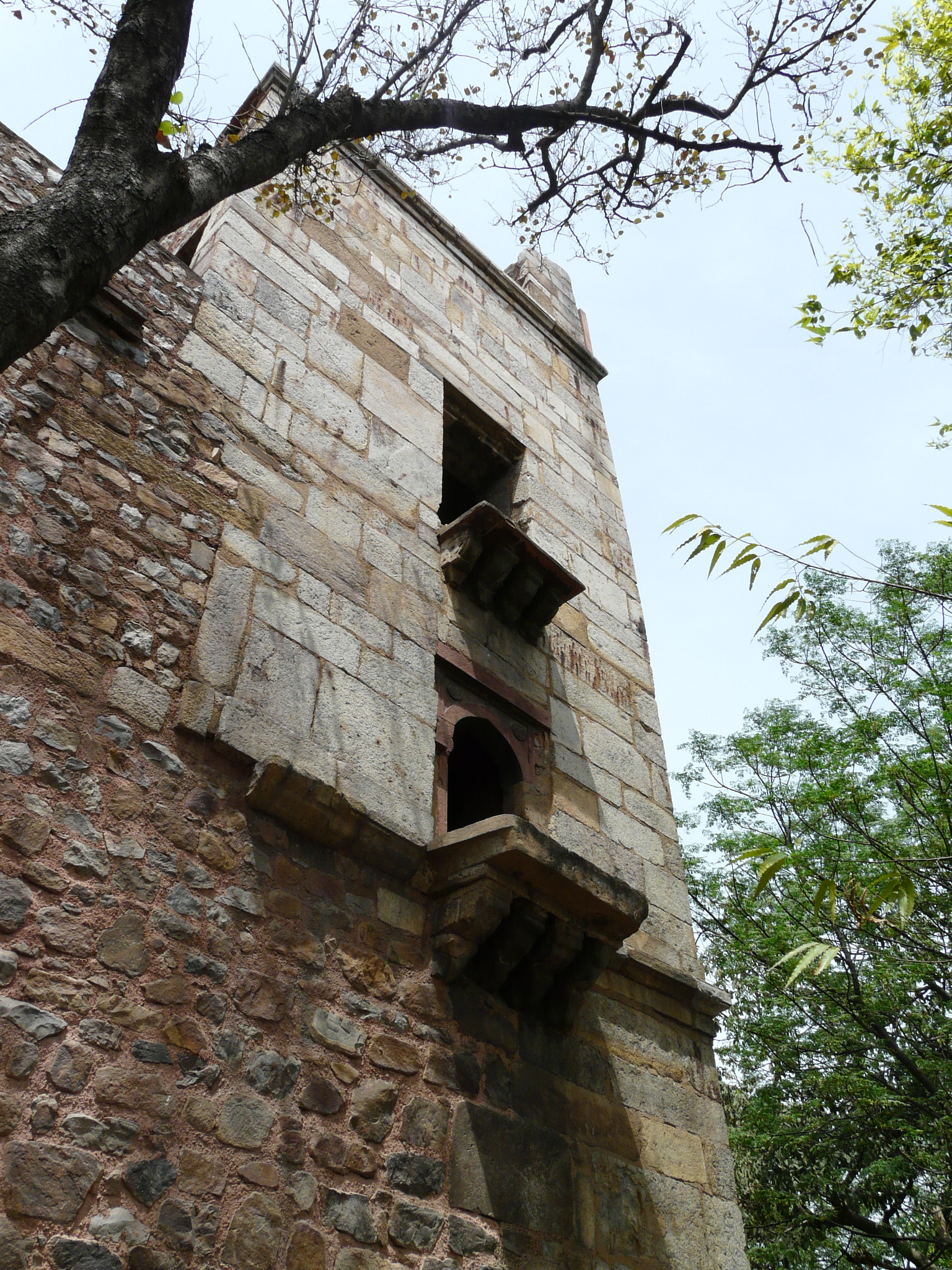
A side view of the Khuni Darwaza

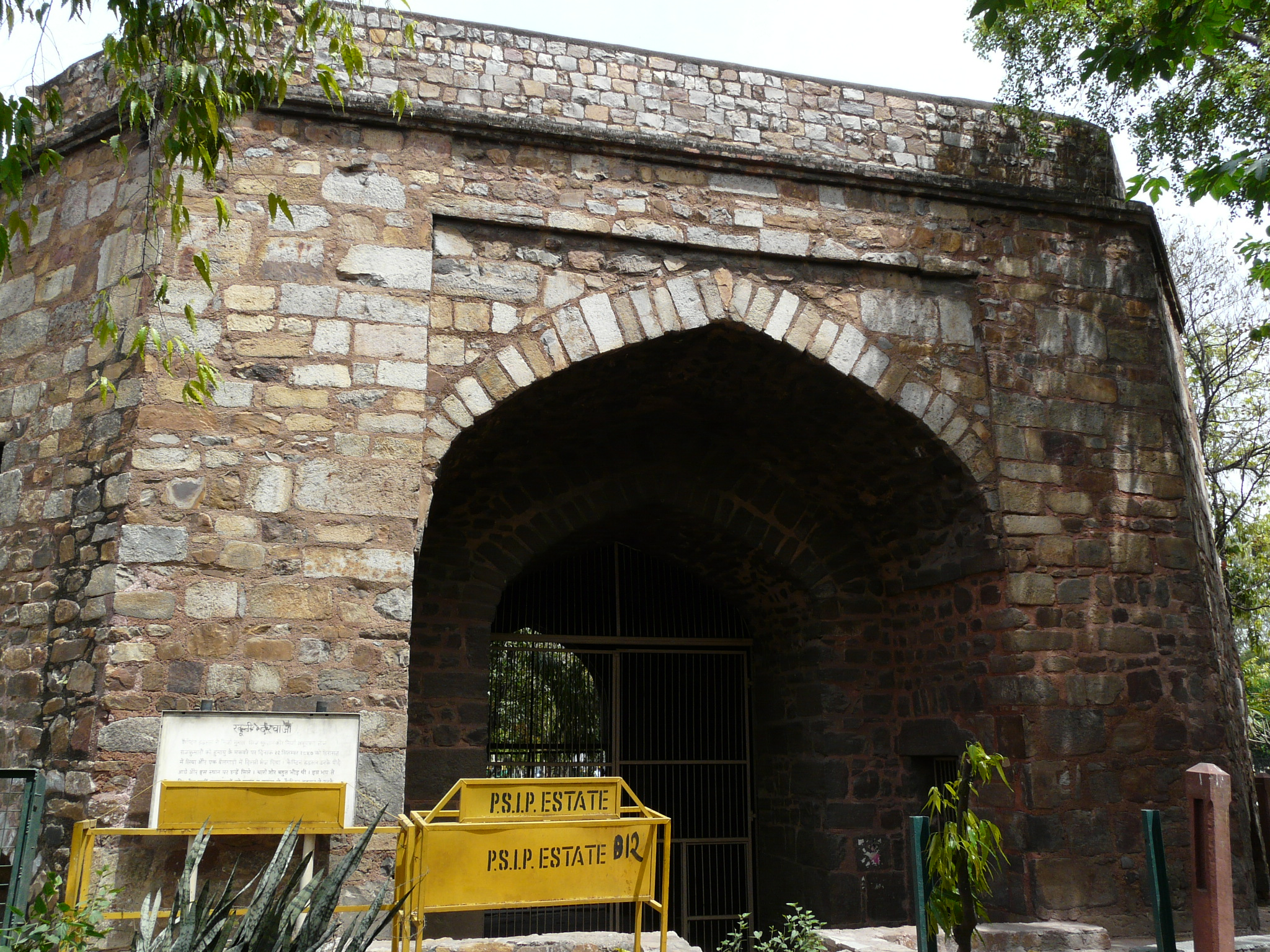
Khuni Darwaza rear view
