= Mirza Khizr Sultan =

Indian Mughal prince, rebellion leader (1834–1857)

- Born: 1834; Red Fort, Delhi, Mughal Kingdom
- Died: 21 September 1857 (aged 22–23); Delhi Gate, Red Fort
- Issue: Mirza Muhammad 'Usman Bahadur; Mirza Muhammad 'Umar Bahadur; Khurshid uz-Zamani Begum; Rahmat Sultan Begum
Names
- Mirza Khair ud-din Muhammad Khizr Sultan Bahadur
- House: Timurid
- Father: Bahadur Shah Zafar
- Mother: Rahim Bakhsh Bai
- Religion: Islam
- Military career
- Rank: Prince
- Conflicts: Indian Rebellion of 1857; Battle of Badli-ki-Serai; Siege of Delhi (1857)

Mirza Khair-ud-din Muhammad Khizr Sultan Bahadur (1834 – 21 September 1857) was a son of the last Mughal emperor, Bahadur Shah II.

Khizr Sultan was a prominent military leader during the Indian Rebellion of 1857. However, that same year he was captured and executed by the British, alongside other members of his family.

== Life ==
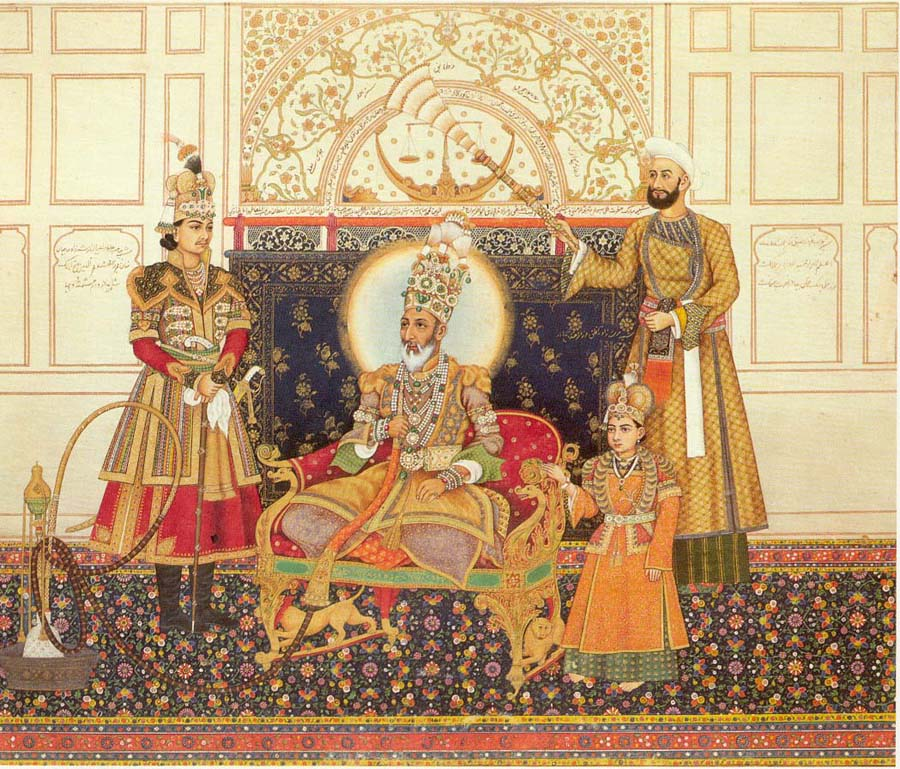
Mirza Khizr Sultan was the son of Bahadur Shah Zafar ll

Born in 1834, Khizr Sultan was the ninth son of Bahadur Shah II. His mother was a palace concubine, Rahim Bakhsh Bai.

Noted for his physical beauty, Khizr Sultan was described by his tutor Ghalib as being "as beautiful as Yusuf". He had some talent as a poet, in addition to his skills as a marksman. He appears to not have been favoured by his father, possibly due to his closeness with his disgraced elder brother, Mirza Fakhru.

During a Durbar in August 1852, Khizr Sultan was publicly rebuked by his father for physically abusing his wife. The prince was described as falling at the emperor's feet and begging for forgiveness. Bahadur Shah angrily struck his son two or three times before pardoning him, warning him to treat his spouse better in the future.

== 1857 Rebellion ==
Khizr Sultan was one of several Mughal princes who joined the Indian rebellion against the British in 1857.

He was the commander of the Indian troops during the Battle of Badli-ki-Serai in June of that year. Though the rebels seemed initially favoured to win, the defection of one of the leaders of the cavalry resulted in their defeat. Khizr Sultan fled the battlefield, though his soldiers fought on before retreating to Delhi.

In September, Khizr Sultan, Bahadur Shah and other members of the Imperial family were taking refuge in Humayun's Tomb when they were captured by the British. He, along with his brother Mirza Mughal and nephew Mirza Abu Bakht, were taken to the Delhi Gate by Major William Hodson, near an archway later nicknamed "the Bloody Gate". Hodson ordered the three princes to strip naked and, using his revolver, shot each of them twice in the heart, one after the other.

Their bodies were hanged in front of the police station for a few days, before being buried unceremoniously.

== Family ==
Khizr Sultan had one son and two daughters:

- Mirza Muhammad 'Usman Bahadur (b. 1850);
- Mirza Muhammad 'Umar Bahadur (b. 1852);
- Umda uz-Zamani Begum;
- Khurshid uz-Zamani Begum;
- Rahmat Sultan Begum;
