= Mirza Dara Bakht =

Prince of the Mughal Empire

- Born: 1790; Red Fort, Delhi
- Died: 8 February 1849 (aged 58–59); Delhi
- Issue: Mirza Muhammad; Mirza Babur; Mirza Humayun; Mirza Timur; Mirza Jahangir; Mirza Shah Jahan; Mirza Aurangzeb; Mirza Deedar Baksh; Mirza Alamgir; Mirza Bahadur; Mirza Farukhsiyar; Mirza Nasir ul-Mulk
- House: Mughal
- Father: Bahadur Shah Zafar

Mirza Dara Bakht Miran Shah Bahadur (1790 – 8 February 1849) was the eldest son of Emperor Bahadur Shah Zafar. He was the crown Prince of the Mughal Empire from 1837 to 1849. He highly influenced his aged father's decisions and was favoured by every one at the court, including his charismatic stepmother Begum Zeenat Mahal. His death in 1849 triggered rivalry for heirdom between Mirza Fath-ul-Mulk Bahadur and Mirza Jawan Bakht, son of Begum Zeenat Mahal.
