= Mirza Abu Bakr (Mughal prince) =

Mughal prince

Mirza Abu Bakr (1837 – 13 October 1857) was a Mughal prince and son of Mughal emperor Bahadur Shah II and Rajun Khawas. He also served the Mughal army during the war of 1857 and was executed on 13 October 1857.

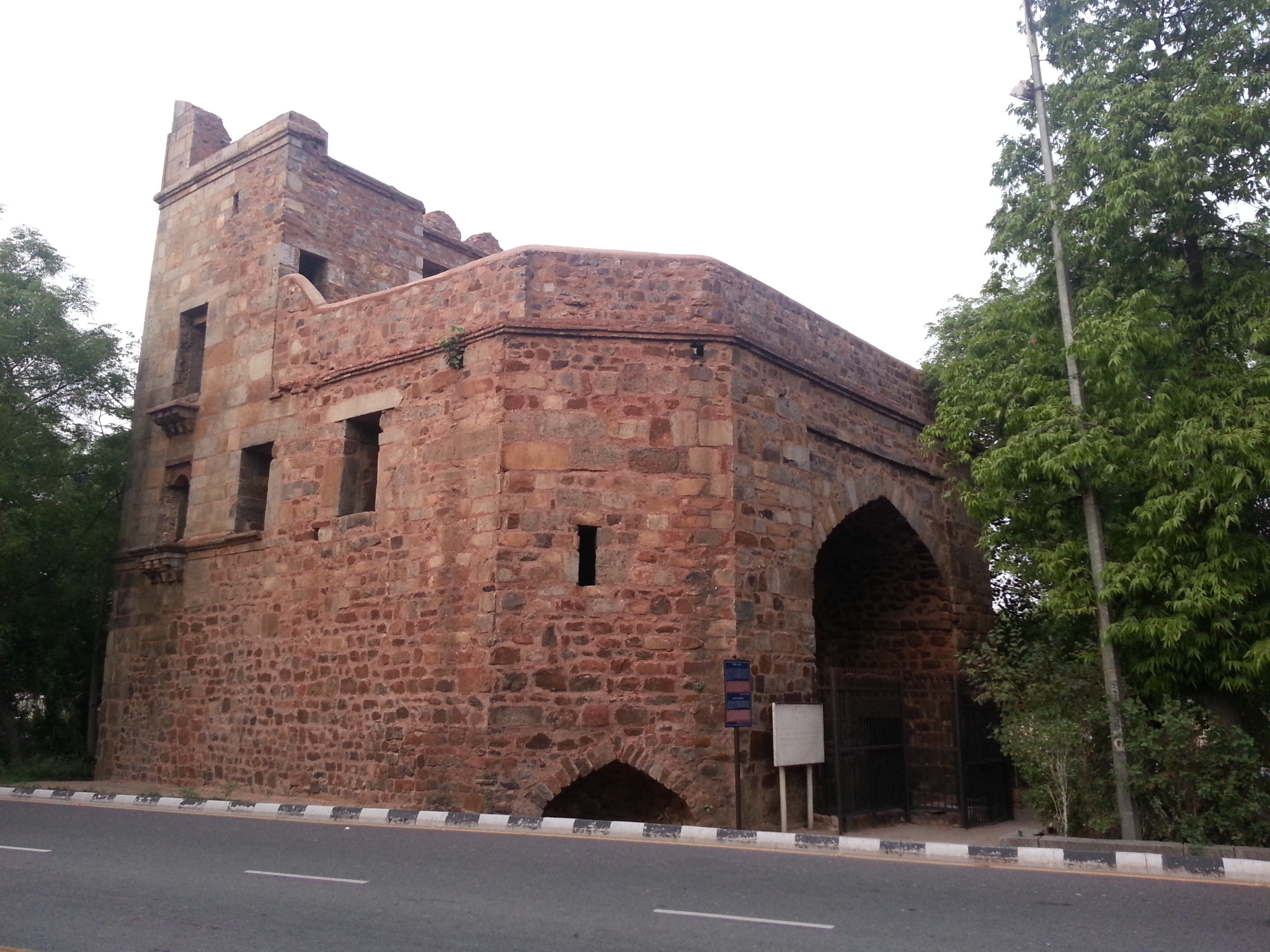
Khooni Darwaza where Mirza Abu Bakr was killed.
