= Bahadur Shah Zafar =

Mughal emperor from 1837 to 1857

Bahadur Shah Zafar بهادر شاہ ظفر
- Shahenshah-e-Hindustan; Badshah
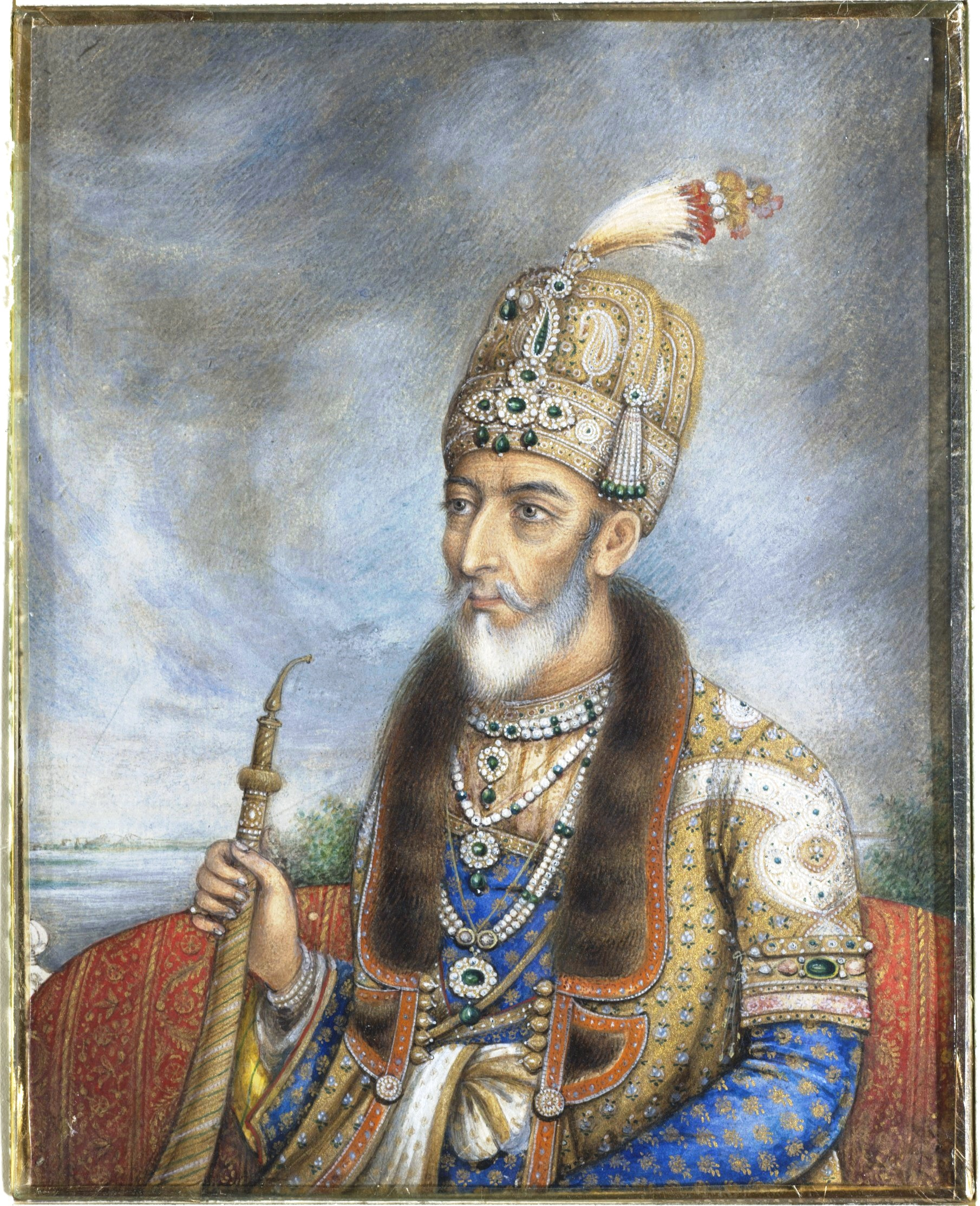
- Portrait of Bahadur Shah II, c. 1850

Mughal emperor
- Reign: 28 September 1837 – 21 September 1857
- Coronation: 29 September 1837
- Predecessor: Akbar II
- Successor: Position abolished
- Born: 24 October 1775; Shahjahanabad, Mughal Empire (present-day Old Delhi, India)
- Died: 7 November 1862 (aged 87); Rangoon, Burma Province, British India
- Burial: 7 November 1862; Rangoon, Burma
- Spouse: Taj Mahal; Zinat Mahal; Sharafat Mahal; Man Bai, Akhtar Mahal; Bandi Bai, Shahabadi Mahal; Sardari Mahal; Mubarak-un-Nissa Begum; Afzal-un-Nissa Khanum; Rahim Bakhsh Bai; Hanwa; Moti Bai; Khayum Bai; Daulat Qadam; Rajun Khawas
- Issue: Mirza Dara Bakht; Mirza Mughal; Mirza Fath-ul-Mulk Bahadur; Mirza Khizr Sultan; Mirza Jawan Bakht; Mirza Shah Abbas; Mirza Abu Bakr; Mirza Ulugh Tahir; Nooruddin Mohammad Shoeb
Names
- Mirza Abu Zafar Siraj-ud-din Muhammad Bahadur Shah Zafar II
Era dates
- 18th & 19th centuries
Regnal name
- Bahadur Shah II
- House: Mughal dynasty
- Dynasty: Timurid dynasty
- Father: Akbar Shah II
- Mother: Lal Bai
- Religion: Sunni Islam
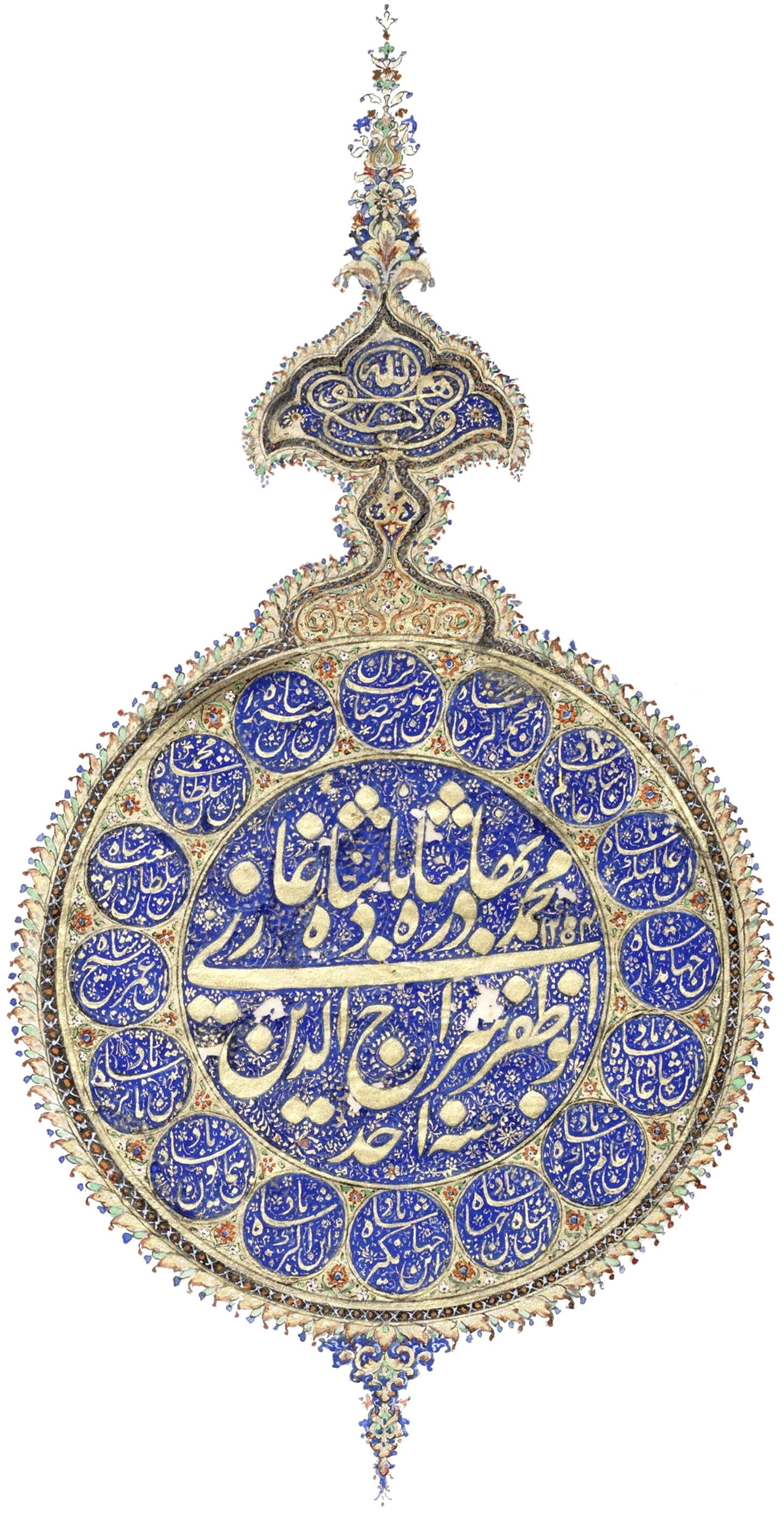
- Imperial Seal
- Military career
- Conflicts: Indian Rebellion of 1857

Bahadur Shah II (Abu Zafar Siraj-ud-din Muhammad; 24 October 1775 – 7 November 1862), also known by his poetic title Bahadur Shah Zafar (Persian: بهادر شاه ظفر; Zafar lit. 'Victory'), (Note: Persian pronunciation: [ba.hɑː.ˈduɾ ʃɑːh za.ˈfaɾ]) was the twentieth and last Mughal emperor and an Urdu poet. He was a titular emperor with his authority limited to the Walled City of Delhi, but was declared the Emperor of India by the forces opposing East India Company forces in parts of the Indian subcontinent during the Indian Rebellion of 1857. Zafar was exiled to Rangoon in British-controlled Burma in December 1857 by the East India Company after rebel defeat in the war, putting an end to the nearly 500-year long Timurid dynasty started by Timur.

His spouse was Zeenat Mahal. He was the second son and the successor to his father, Akbar II, who died in 1837.

Bahadur Shah Zafar's father, Akbar II, had been imprisoned by the British and he was not his father's preferred choice as his successor. One of Akbar Shah's queens pressured him to declare her son, Mirza Jahangir, as his successor. However, the East India Company exiled Jahangir after he attacked Archibald Seton, their resident in the Red Fort, paving the way for Bahadur Shah to assume the throne.

== Reign ==
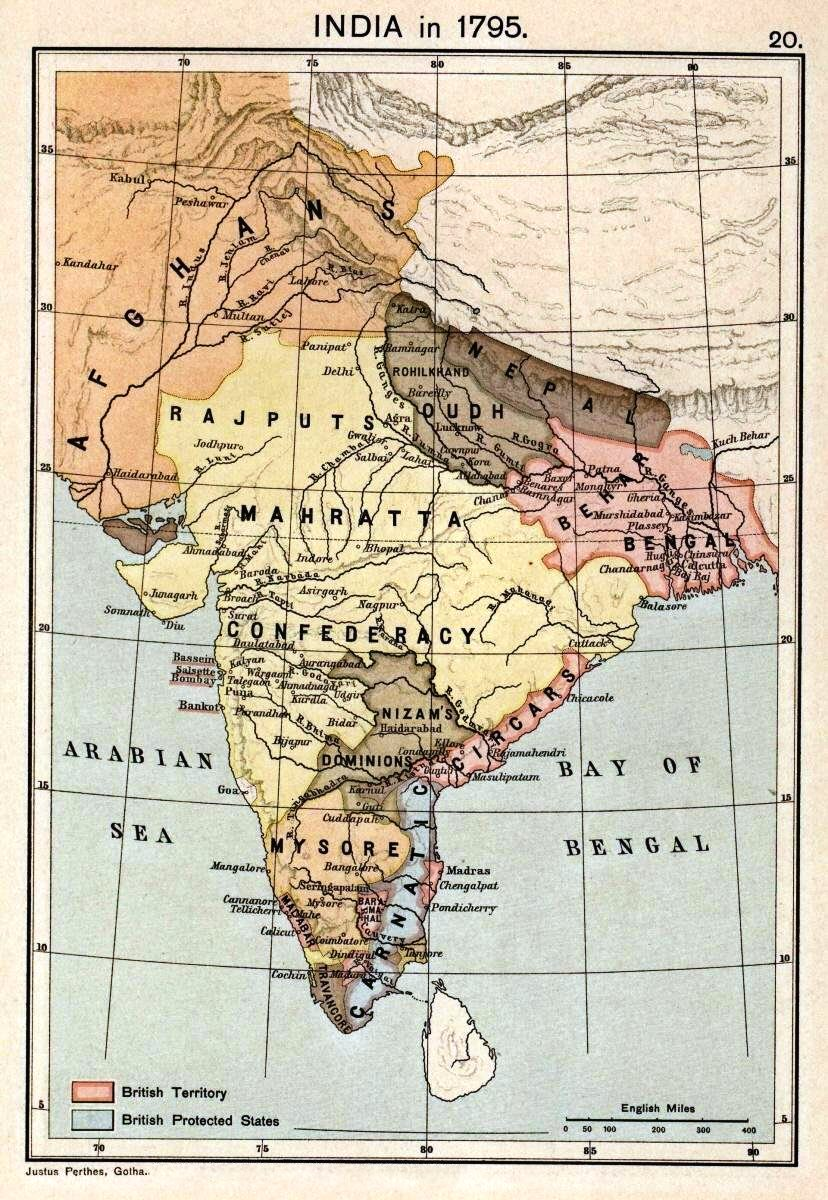
Map of India in 1795

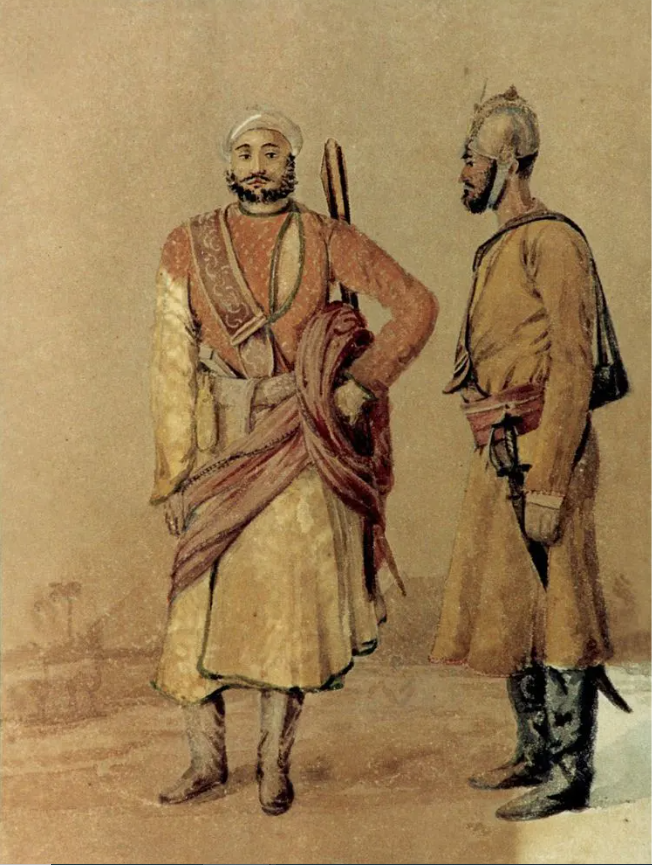
Police in Delhi during the reign of Bahadur Shah II, 1842

Bahadur Shah Zafar ruled over a Mughal Empire that had by the early 19th century been reduced to only the city of Delhi and the surrounding territory as far as Palam. The Maratha Empire had brought an end to the Mughal Empire in the Deccan during the 18th century and the regions of India formerly under Mughal rule had either been absorbed by the Marathas or had declared independence and become smaller kingdoms. The Marathas installed Shah Alam II in the throne in 1772, under the protection of the Maratha general Mahadaji Shinde and maintained suzerainty over Mughal affairs in Delhi. The East India Company became the dominant political and military power in mid-nineteenth century India. Outside the region controlled by the company, hundreds of kingdoms and principalities fragmented their land. The emperor was respected by the company, who provided him with a pension. The emperor permitted the company to collect taxes from Delhi and maintain a military force in it. Zafar never had any interest in statecraft or had any "imperial ambition". After the Indian Rebellion of 1857, the British exiled him from Delhi.

Bahadur Shah Zafar was a noted Urdu poet, having written a number of Urdu ghazals. While some part of his opus was lost or destroyed during the Indian Rebellion of 1857, a large collection did survive, and was compiled into the Kulliyyat-i-Zafar. The court that he maintained was home to several renowned Urdu scholars, poets and writers including Mirza Ghalib, Daagh Dehlvi, Momin Khan Momin, and Mohammad Ibrahim Zauq (who was also Bahadur Shah Zafar's mentor).

=== 1857 Rebellion ===
As the Indian Rebellion of 1857 spread, Sepoy regiments reached the Mughal Court at Delhi.

On 12 May 1857, Zafar held his first formal audience in several years. It was attended by several sepoys who were described as treating him "familiarly or disrespectfully". When the sepoys first arrived at Bahadur Shah Zafar's court, he asked them why they had come to him, because he had no means of maintaining them. Bahadur Shah Zafar's conduct was indecisive. However, he yielded to the demands of the sepoys when he was told that they would not be able to win against the East India Company without him.

On 16 May, sepoys and palace servants killed fifty-two Europeans who were prisoners of the palace and who were discovered hiding in the city. The executions took place under a peepul tree in front of the palace, despite Zafar's protests. The aim of the executioners was to implicate him in the killings. Once he had joined them, Bahadur Shah II took ownership for all the actions of the mutineers. Though dismayed by the looting and disorder, he gave his public support to the rebellion. It was later believed that Bahadur Shah was not directly responsible for the massacre, but that he may have been able to prevent it, and he was therefore considered a consenting party during his trial.

The administration of the city and its new occupying army was described as "chaotic and troublesome", which functioned "haphazardly". The Emperor nominated his eldest son, Mirza Mughal, as the commander in chief of his forces. However, Mirza Mughal had little military experience and was rejected by the sepoys. The sepoys did not have any commander since each regiment refused to accept orders from someone other than their own officers. Mirza Mughal's administration extended no further than the city. Outside Gujjar herders began levying their own tolls on traffic, and it became increasingly difficult to feed the city.

During the Siege of Delhi when the victory of the British became certain, Zafar took refuge at Humayun's Tomb, in an area that was then at the outskirts of Delhi. Company forces led by Major William Hodson surrounded the tomb and Zafar was captured on 20 September 1857. The next day, Hodson shot his sons Mirza Mughal and Mirza Khizr Sultan, and grandson Mirza Abu Bakht under his own authority at the Khooni Darwaza, near the Delhi Gate and declared Delhi to be captured. Bahadur Shah himself was taken to his wife's haveli, where he was treated disrespectfully by his captors. When brought news of the executions of his sons and grandson, the former emperor was described as being so shocked and depressed that he was unable to react.

After Zafar's defeat, he said:

غازیوں میں بُو رہے گی جب تلک ایمان کی
تخت لندن تک چلے گی تیغ ہندوستان کی
As long as there remains the scent of faith in the hearts of our Ghazis,
so long shall the sword of Hindustan flash before the throne of London.

== Trial ==
The trial was a consequence of the Sepoy Mutiny and lasted for 21 days, had 19 hearings, 21 witnesses and over a hundred documents in Persian and Urdu, with their English translations, were produced in the court. At first the trial was suggested to be held at Calcutta, the place where Directors of East India company used to their sittings in connection with their commercial pursuits. But instead, the Red Fort in Delhi was selected for the trial. It was the first case to be tried at the Red Fort.

Zafar was tried and charged on four counts:

1. Aiding and abetting the mutinies of the troops
2. Encouraging and assisting divers persons in waging war against the British Government
3. Assuming the sovereignty of Hindostan
4. Causing and being accessory to the murder of the Christians.

— Proceedings of the April 1858 Trial of Bahadur Shah Zafar 'King of Delhi'

On the 20th day of the trial, Bahadur Shah II defended himself against these charges. Bahadur Shah, in his defense, stated his complete haplessness before the will of the sepoys. The sepoys apparently used to affix his seal on empty envelopes, the contents of which he was absolutely unaware. While the emperor may have been overstating his impotence before the sepoys, the fact remains that the sepoys had felt powerful enough to dictate terms to anybody. The eighty-two-year old poet-king was harassed by the mutineers and was neither inclined to nor capable of providing any real leadership. Despite this, he was the primary accused in the trial for the rebellion.

Hakim Ahsanullah Khan, Zafar's most trusted confidant and both his Prime Minister and personal physician, had insisted that Zafar did not involve himself in the rebellion and had surrendered himself to the British. But when Zafar ultimately did this, Hakim Ahsanullah Khan betrayed him by providing evidence against him at the trial in return for a pardon for himself.

Respecting Hodson's guarantee on his surrender, Zafar was not sentenced to death but exiled to Rangoon, Burma. His wife Zeenat Mahal and some of the remaining members of the family accompanied him. At 4 am on 7 October 1858, Zafar along with his wives, two remaining sons began his journey towards Rangoon in bullock carts escorted by 9th Lancers under command of Lieutenant Ommaney.

== Death ==
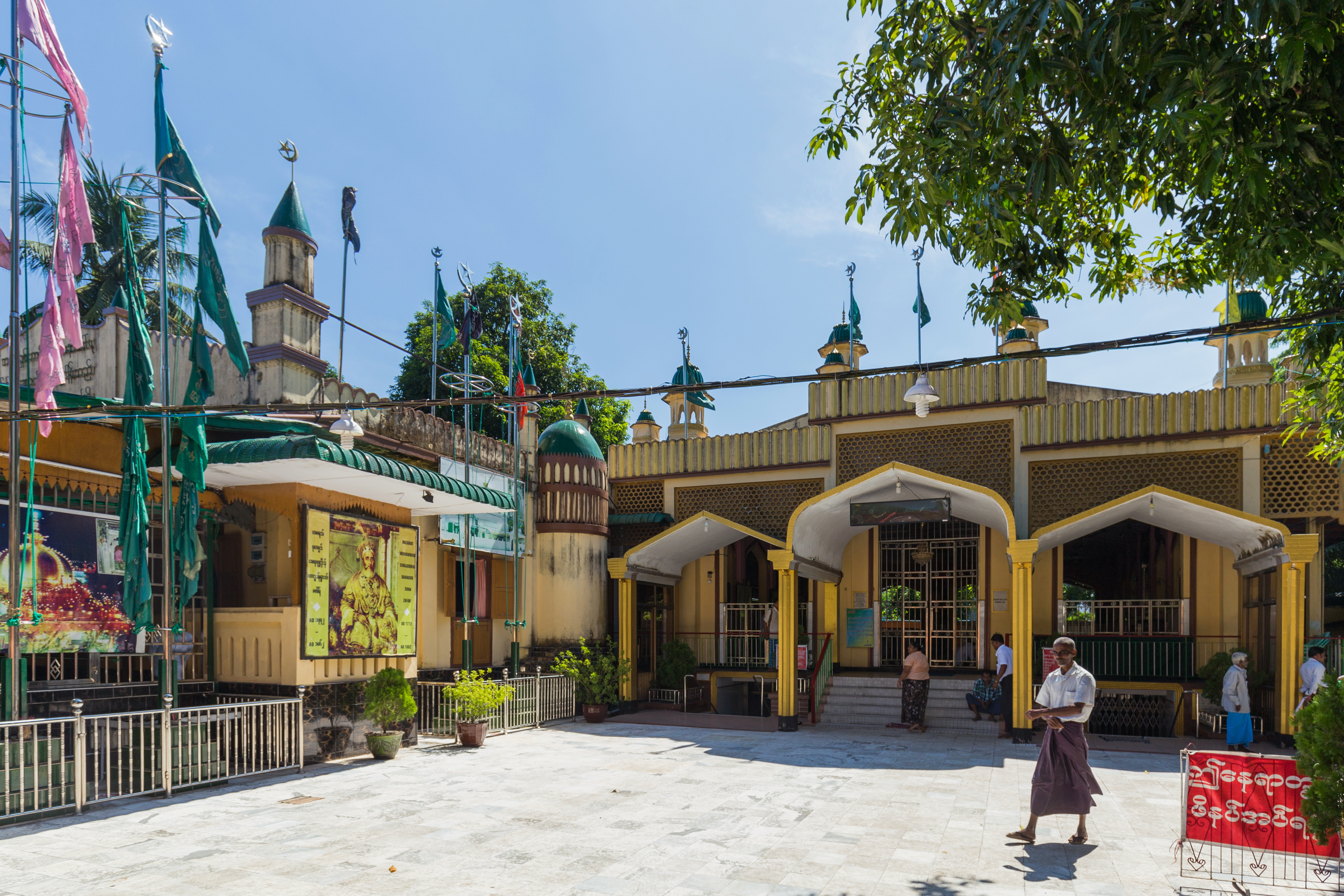
Bahadur Shah Zafar Dargah Memorial, Yangon

In 1862, at the age of 87, he fell ill. In October, his condition deteriorated. He was "spoon-fed on broth" but he found that difficult too by 3 November. On 6 November, the British Commissioner in Rangoon, Captain H. Nelson Davies, wrote that Zafar "is evidently sinking from pure desuetude and paralysis in the region of his throat". To prepare for his death, Davies commanded the collection of lime and bricks, and a spot was selected at the "back of Zafar's enclosure" for his burial. Zafar died on Friday, 7 November 1862 at 5 am. and was buried at 4 pm near the Shwedagon Pagoda at 6 Ziwaka Road, near the intersection with Shwedagon Pagoda Road, Yangon. The shrine of Bahadur Shah Zafar Dargah was built there after the restoration of his tomb on 16 February 1991. Davies commenting on Zafar, described his life as "very uncertain".

== Family and descendants ==
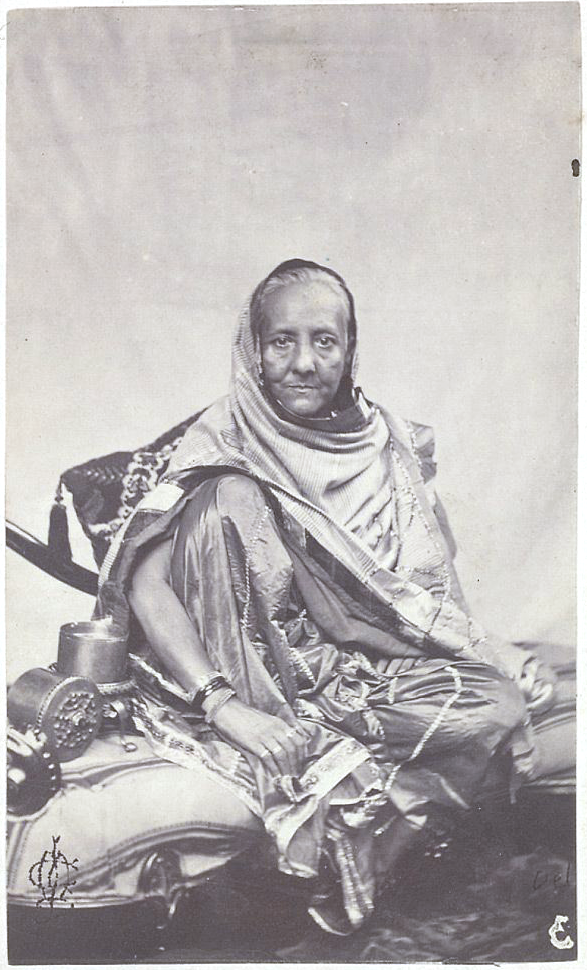
Purported photograph of Zinat Mahal Begum, his consort

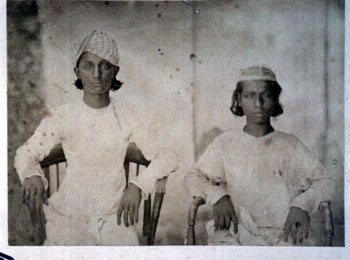
Sons of Bahadur Shah Zafar. On the left is Jawan Bakht, and on the right is Mirza Shah Abbas.

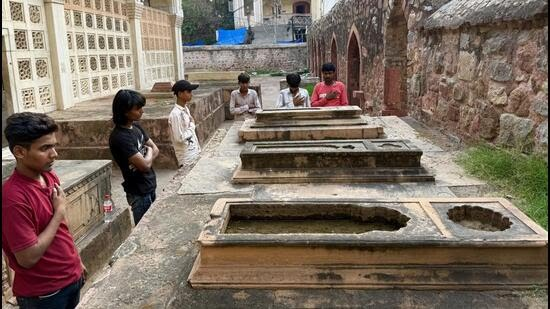
The graves of Akhtar Mahal, Ashraf Mahal, and Taj Mahal Begum, Chausath Khamba

Bahadur Shah Zafar had four wives and numerous concubines. His wives were:

- Begum Ashraf Mahal
- Begum Akhtar Mahal
- Begum Zeenat Mahal
- Begum Taj Mahal

He had twenty-two sons including:

- Mirza Dara Bakht Miran Shah (1790–1841)
- Mirza Muhammed Shahrukh Bahadur
- Mirza Kayumar Bahadur
- Mirza Fath-ul-Mulk Bahadur (alias Mirza Fakhru) (1816–1856)
- Mirza Muhammad Quwaish Bahadur
- Mirza Mughal (1817–1857)
- Mirza Quraish Shikoh (1820–c. 1889)
- Mirza Farkhanda Shah Bahadur
- Mirza Khizr Sultan (1834–1857)
- Mirza Bakhtavar Shah Bahadur
- Mirza Sohrab Hindi Bahadur
- Mirza Abu Nasr
- Mirza Muhammad Bahadur
- Mirza Abdullah
- Mirza Kuchak Sultan
- Mirza Abu Bakr (1837–1857)
- Mirza Jawan Bakht (1841–1884)
- Mirza Shah Abbas (1845–1910)
- Muhammad Sher Shah
- Nooruddin Mohammad Shoeb

He had at least thirty-two daughters including:

- Rabeya Begum
- Begum Fatima Sultan
- Kulsum Zamani Begum
- Raunaq Zamani Begum (possibly a granddaughter, d. 1930)

Many individuals claim to be descendants of Bahadur Shah Zafar, living in places throughout India, such as Hyderabad, Aurangabad, Delhi, Bhopal, Kolkata, Bihar, and Bengaluru. However, the claims are often disputed.

== Religious beliefs ==
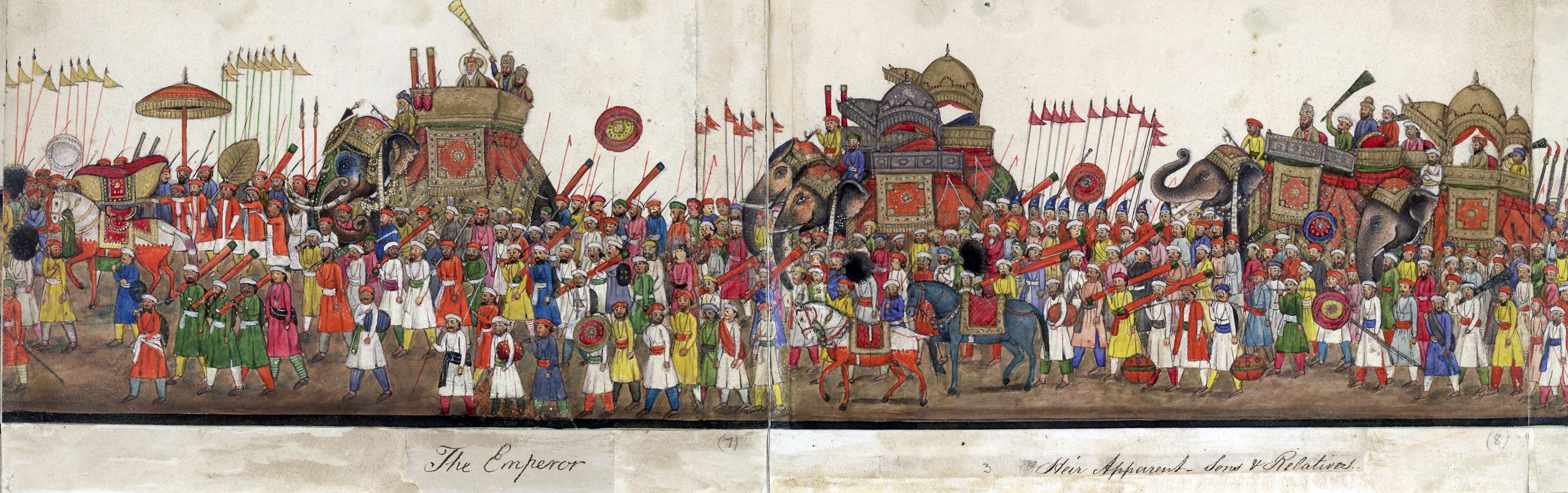
A panorama showing the imperial procession to celebrate the feast of the Eid al-Fitr, with the emperor on the elephant to the left and his sons to the right (24 October 1843)

Bahadur Shah Zafar was a devout Sufi. He was regarded as a Sufi Pir and used to accept murids or pupils. The newspaper Delhi Urdu Akhbaar described him as "one of the leading saints of the age, approved of by the divine court." Before his accession, he lived like "a poor scholar and dervish", differing from his three royal brothers, Mirza Jahangir, Salim and Babur. In 1828, a decade before he succeeded the throne, Major Archer said that "Zafar is a man of spare figure and stature, plainly apparelled, almost approaching to meanness." His appearance is that of an indigent munshi or teacher of languages".

As a poet, Zafar imbibed the highest subtleties of mystical Sufi teachings. He was also a believer of the magical and superstitious side of the Orthodox Sufism. Like many of his followers, he believed that his position as both a Sufi pir and emperor gave him spiritual powers. In an incident in which one of his followers was bitten by a snake, Zafar tried to cure him by giving a "seal of Bezoar" (a stone antidote to poison) and some water on which he had breathed to the man to drink.

The emperor had a staunch belief in ta'aviz or charms, especially as a palliative for his constant complaint of piles, or to ward off evil spells. During a period of illness, he told a group of Sufi pirs that several of his wives suspected that someone had cast a spell over him. He requested them to take some steps to remove all apprehension on this account. The group wrote some charms and asked the emperor to mix them in water and drink it, which would protect him from the evil. A coterie of pirs, miracle workers and Hindu astrologers were always in touch with the emperor. On their advice, he would sacrifice buffaloes and camels, buried eggs and arrested alleged black magicians, and wore a ring that they told him would cure his indigestion. He also donated cows to the poor, elephants to the Sufi shrines and horses to the khadims or clergy of Jama Masjid.

In one of his verses, Zafar explicitly stated that both Hinduism and Islam shared the same essence. This philosophy was implemented by his court which embodied a multicultural composite Hindu-Islamic Mughal culture. He celebrated many Hindu festivals like Rakhi, Holi, Diwali etc in the court. Zafar was also tolerant of Shia Muslims who regained their lost influence at the Mughal court under him.

== Epitaph ==
He was a prolific Urdu poet and calligrapher. He wrote the following Ghazal as his own epitaph. In his book, The Last Mughal, William Dalrymple states that, according to Lahore scholar Imran Khan, the beginning of the verse, umr-e-darāz māṅg ke ("I asked for a long life") was not written by Zafar, and does not appear in any of the works published during Zafar's lifetime. The verse was allegedly written by Simab Akbarabadi.

Original Urdu

لگتا نہیں ہے جی مِرا اُجڑے دیار میں
کس کی بنی ہے عالمِ ناپائیدار میں

بُلبُل کو پاسباں سے نہ صیاد سے گلہ
قسمت میں قید لکھی تھی فصلِ بہار میں

کہہ دو اِن حسرتوں سے کہیں اور جا بسی
اتنی جگہ کہاں ہے دلِ داغدار میں

اِک شاخِ گل پہ بیٹھ کے بُلبُل ہے شادماں
کانٹے بِچھا دیتے ہیں دلِ لالہ زار میں

عمرِ دراز مانگ کے لائے تھے چار دِن
دو آرزو میں کٹ گئے، دو اِنتظار میں

دِن زندگی کے ختم ہوئے شام ہوگئی
پھیلا کے پائوں سوئیں گے کنج مزار میں

کتنا ہے بدنصیب ظفر دفن کے لئے
دو گز زمین بھی نہ ملی کوئے یار میں

Devanagari transliteration

लगता नहीं है जी मेरा उजड़े दयार में
किसकी बनी है आलम-ए-नापायेदार में

बुलबुल को पासबाँ से न सैयाद से गिला
क़िस्मत में क़ैद लिखी थी फ़स्ल-ए-बहार में

कह दो इन हसरतों से कहीं और जा बसें
इतनी जगह कहाँ है दिल-ए-दाग़दार में

इक शाख़-ए-गुल पे बैठ के बुलबुल है शादमाँ
काँटे बिछा दिये हैं दिल-ए-लालाज़ार में

उम्र-ए-दराज़ माँगके लाए थे चार दिन
दो आरज़ू में कट गए, दो इन्तज़ार में

दिन ज़िन्दगी के ख़त्म हुए शाम हो गई
फैला के पाँव सोएँगे कुंज-ए-मज़ार में

कितना है बदनसीब "ज़फ़र″ दफ़्न के लिए
दो गज़ ज़मीन भी न मिली कू-ए-यार में

Roman transliteration

lagtā nahī̃ hai jī mirā ujṛe dayār mẽ
kis kī banī hai ālam-e-nā-pāedār mẽ

bulbul ko pāsbā̃ se na sayyād se gilā
qismat mẽ qaid likkhī thī fasl-e-bahār mẽ

kah do in hasratõ se kahī̃ aur jā basẽ
itnī jagah kahā̃ hai dil-e-dāġdār mẽ

ik shāx-e-gul pe baiṭh ke bulbul hai shādmā̃
kā̃ṭe bichā diye hãi dil-e-lālāzār mẽ

umr-e-darāz māṅg ke lāe the cār din
do ārzū mẽ kaṭ gae do intizār mẽ

din zindagī ke xatm hue shām ho gaī
phailā ke pāõ soeṅge kūñj-e-mazār mẽ

kitnā hai badnasīb zafar dafn ke lie
do gaz zamīn bhī na milī kū-e-yār mẽ

English translation

My heart has no repose in this despoiled land
Who has ever felt fulfilled in this futile world?

The nightingale complains about neither the sentinel nor the hunter
Fate had decreed imprisonment during the harvest of spring

Tell these longings to go dwell elsewhere
What space is there for them in this besmirched heart?

Sitting on a branch of flowers, the nightingale rejoices
It has strewn thorns in the garden of my heart

I asked for a long life, I received four days
Two passed in desire, two in waiting.

The days of life are over, evening has fallen
I shall sleep, legs outstretched, in my tomb

How unfortunate is Zafar! For his burial
Not even two yards of land were to be had, in the land of his beloved.

== Image gallery ==
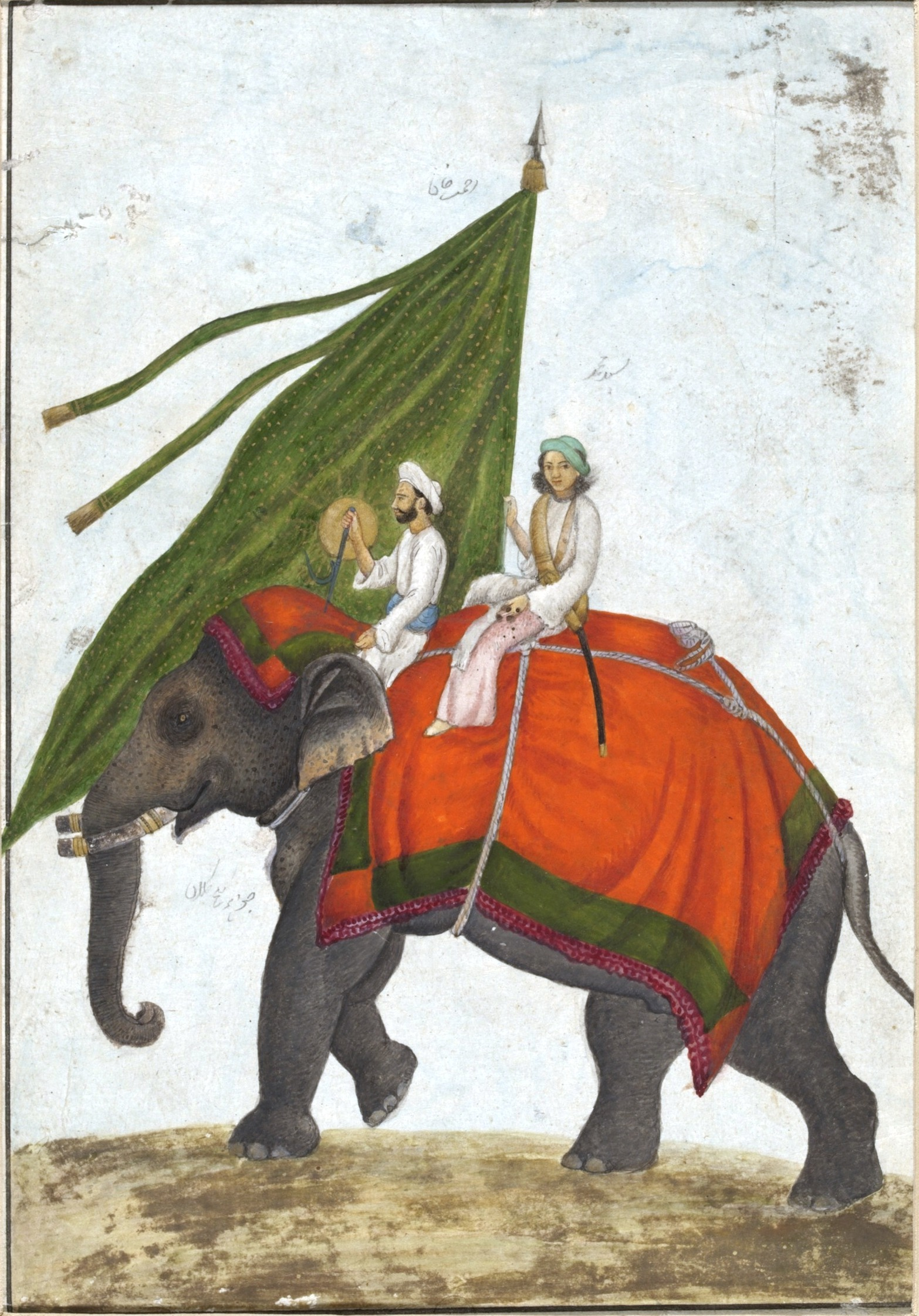
One of the many Alam (flags) of the Mughal Empire

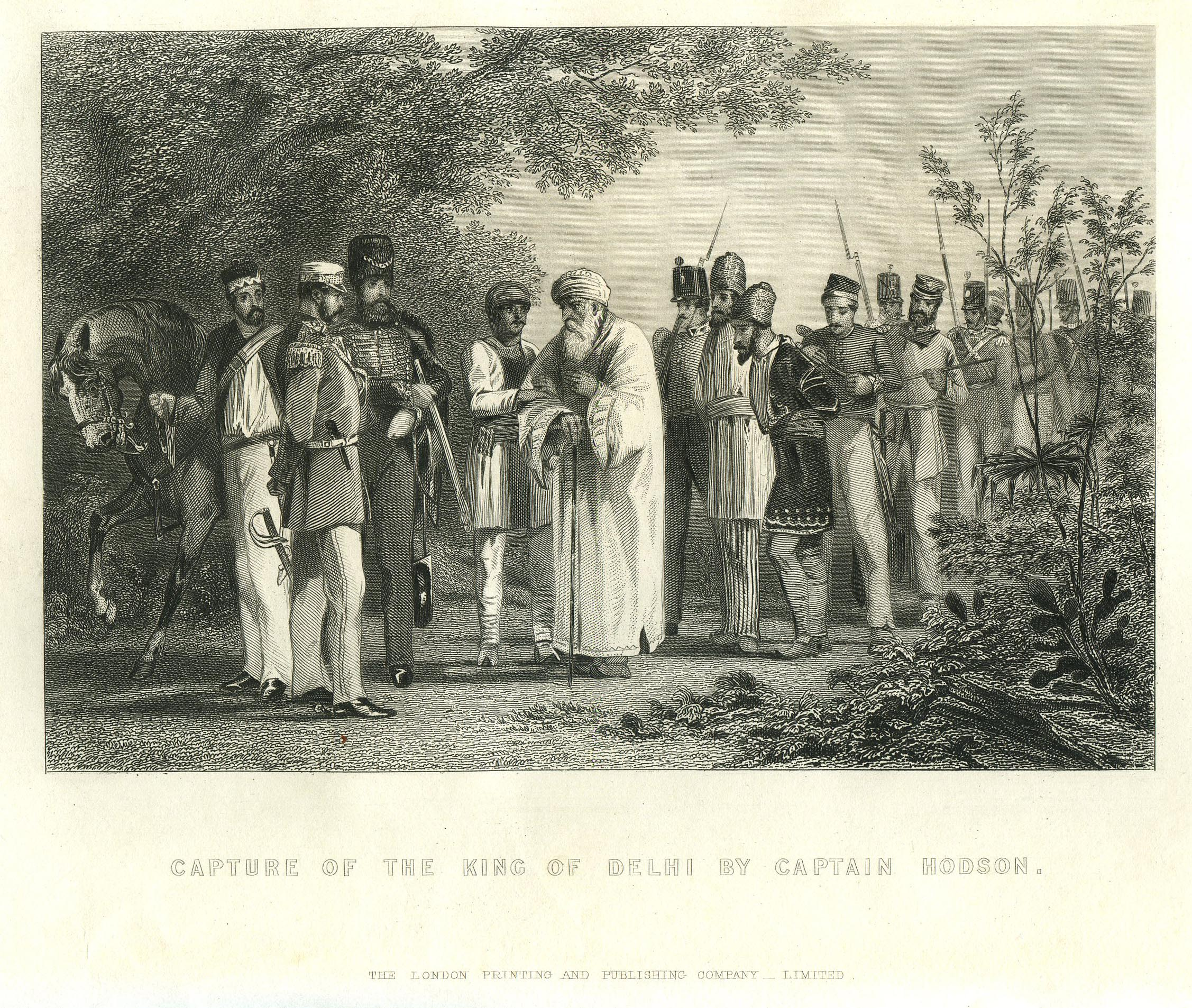
Capture of the emperor and his sons by William Hodson at Humayun's tomb on 20 September 1857

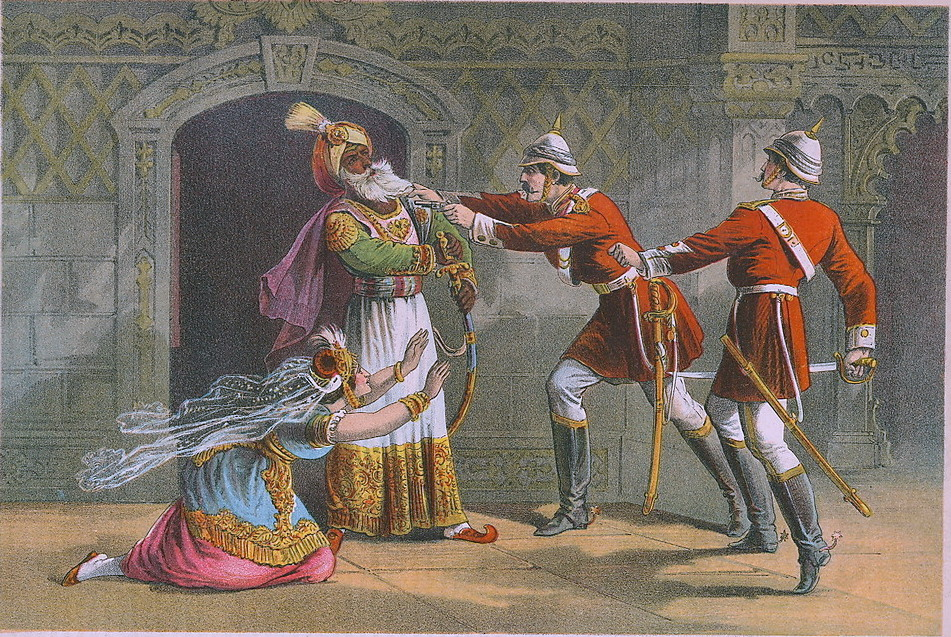
"The seizure of the King of Delhi by Capt Henry M Hodson of Hodson's Horse", painted by a British artist in 1878

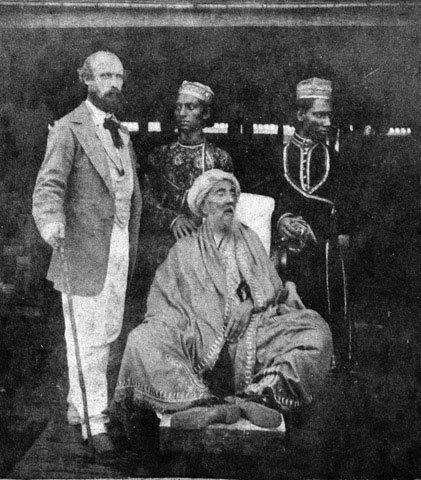
Bahadur Shah II with his sons Mirza Jawan Bakht and Mirza Shah Abbas along with a British personnel while he was in exile in Burma

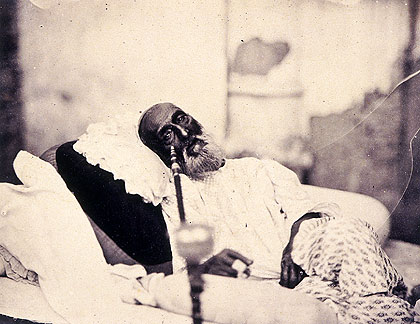
Bahadur Shah Zafar in 1858, just after his trial and before his departure for exile in Burma

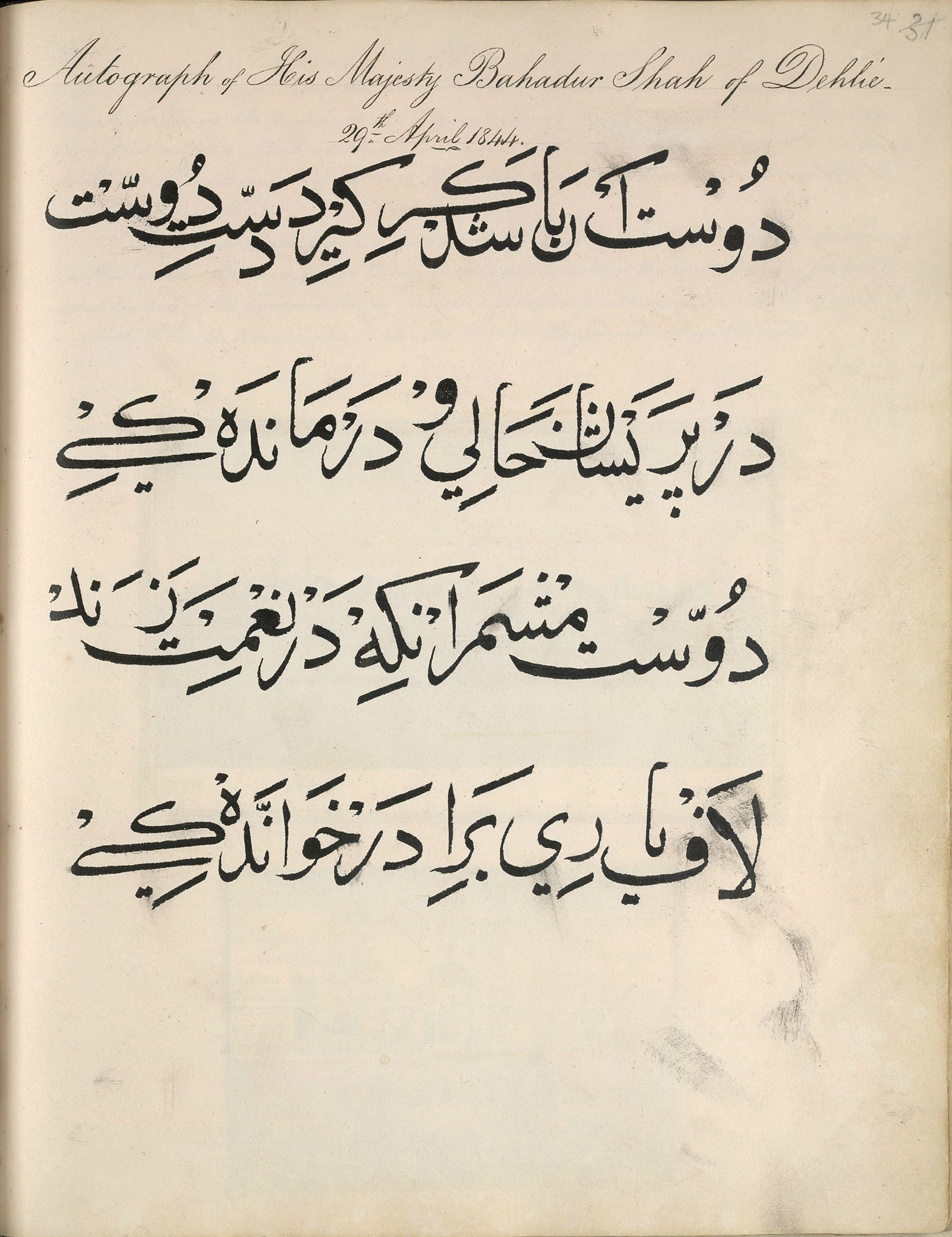
Poem written by Zafar, dated 29 April 1844

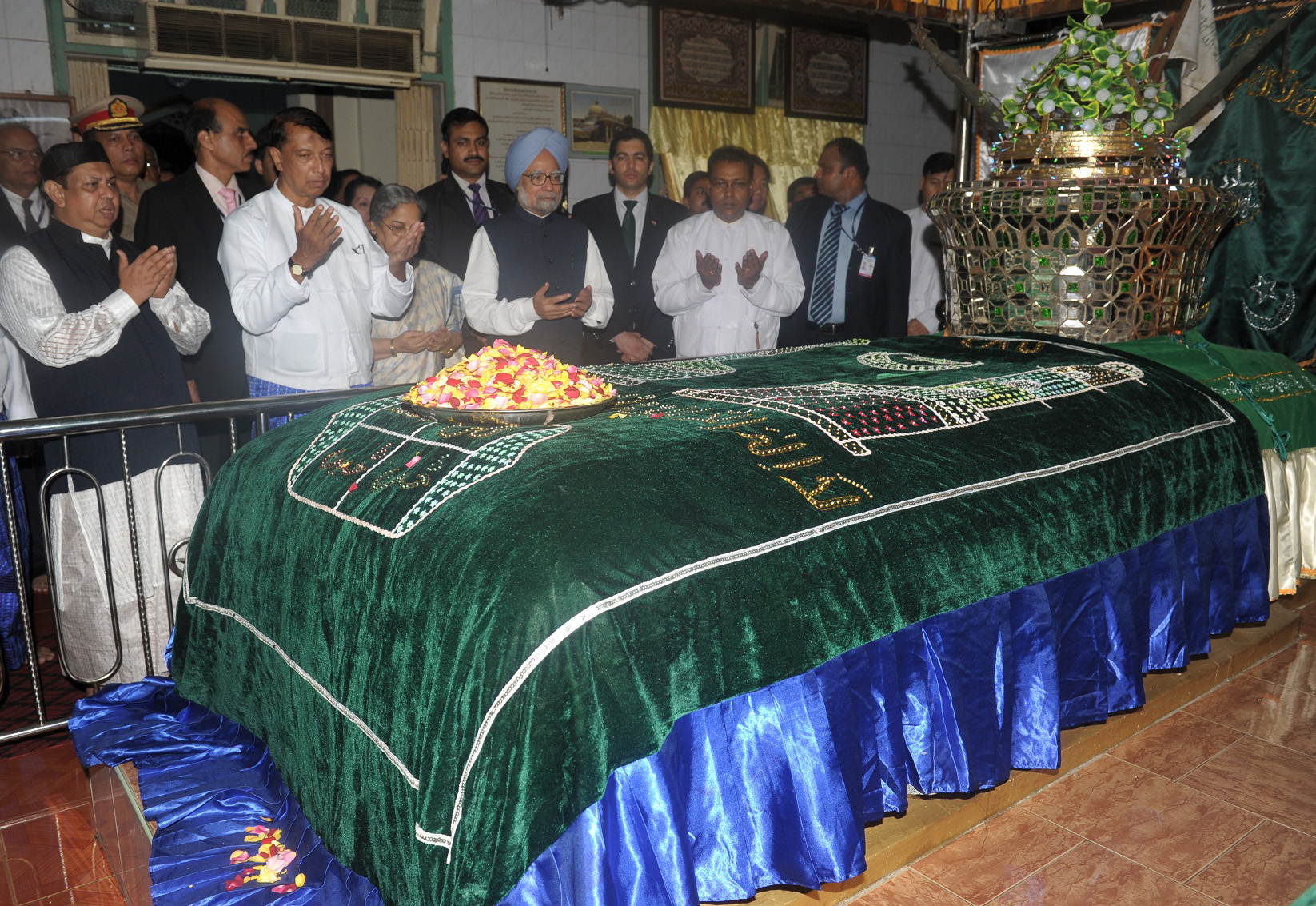
Prime Minister of India Manmohan Singh praying at the Mazar of Bahadur Shah Zafar, in Yangon, Myanmar

== Legacy ==
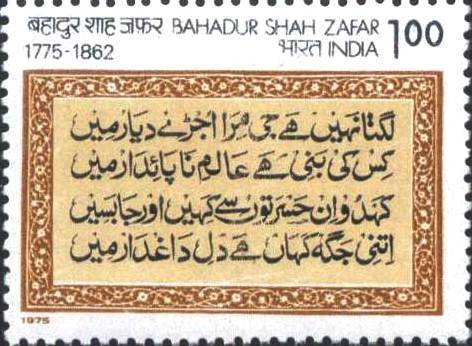
Zafar on a 1975 stamp.

Zafar is seen as the hero of Indian rebellion of 1857. In 1943, the Indian National Army paid tribute to his tomb in Rangoon. In 1975, Indian government released a postal stamp in his honour.

=== In popular culture ===
Zafar was portrayed in the play 1857: Ek Safarnama set during the Indian Rebellion of 1857 by Javed Siddiqui. It was staged at Purana Qila, Delhi ramparts by Nadira Babbar and the National School of Drama repertory company in 2008. A Hindi-Urdu black-and-white movie, Lal Quila (1960), directed by Nanabhai Bhatt, showcased Bahadur Shah Zafar extensively.

=== TV serials and films ===
A television show, Bahadur Shah Zafar, aired on Doordarshan in 1986. Ashok Kumar played the lead role in it.

In the 2001 Hindi historical drama series 1857 Kranti, on DD National, the character of Bahadur Shah Zafar was played by S. M. Zaheer.

In the 2005 Bollywood film Mangal Pandey: The Rising, directed by Ketan Mehta, the character of Bahadur Shah Zafar was played by Habib Tanveer.

In historical series Bharat Ek Khoj which aired on Doordarshan he was portrayed by Virendra Razdan.

In Gulzar's TV serial Mirza Ghalib, Zafar was played by Sudhir Dalvi.

== See also ==
- List of Mughal Emperors
- Emperor/Empress of India
- List of Indian monarchs
- List of Urdu poets
- Shahzada Muhammad Hidayat Afshar, Ilahi Bakhsh Bahadur

== Bibliography ==
- Portrait of Bahadur Shah in 1840s The Delhi Book of Thomas Metcalfe
- Dalrymple, William (2009). The Last Mughal: The Fall of a Dynasty, Delhi, 1857. Bloomsbury Publishing. ISBN 978-1-4088-0688-3.
- Das Khosla, Gopal (1969). The Last Mughal. Hind Pocket Books.
- Garrett, H. L. O. (2007). The Trial of Bahadur Shah Zafar. Roli Books. ISBN 978-8174365842.
- Husain, S. Mahdi (2006). Bahadur Shah Zafar and the War of 1857 in Delhi. Aakar Books. ISBN 8187879912.
- Kanda, K. C. (2007). Bahadur Shah Zafar and His Contemporaries: Zauq, Ghalib, Momin, Shefta: Selected Poetry. Sterling Publishers Pvt. Ltd. ISBN 978-81-207-3286-5.
- Nayar, Pramod K. (2007). The Trial of Bahadur Shah Zafar. Orient Longman. ISBN 978-81-250-3270-0.
- Shashi, Shyam Singh (1999). Encyclopaedia Indica: Bahadur Shah II, The Last Mughal Emperor. Anmol Publications. ISBN 978-81-7041-859-7.

Bahadur Shah Zafar Timurid dynasty
Regnal titles
Preceded by Akbar II	Mughal Emperor; 1837–1857	Abolished British Raj established
