= Karamat Ali Karamat =

Indian Urdu-language author and mathematician (1936–2022)

Doctor, Professor Karamat Ali Karamat
- کرامت علی کرامت
- Born: Karamat Ali; 23 September 1936; Odia Bazar, Cuttack, Orissa Province, British India
- Died: 5 August 2022 (aged 85); Cuttack, Odisha, India
- Citizenship: British India; India
- Education: B.Sc; M.Sc; Ph.D
- Alma mater: Ravenshaw Collegiate School; Ravenshaw College; Sambalpur University
- Occupations: Poet, literary critic, writer, translator, and mathematician
- Years active: 1953–2022
- Notable work: Aab e Khizar; Lafzon Ka Aakāsh; Izāfi Tanqīd
- Spouse: Zubaida Ali (m. 1959; died 2020)
- Children: Qutub Kamran (son)
- Parent: Rahmat Ali Rahmat (father)
- Awards: Sahitya Akademi Translation Prize for Urdu (2004)
- Scientific career
- Fields: Probability theory
- Thesis: Some Properties of Random Equations (1978)
- Doctoral advisor: Mahendra Nath Mishra

Karamat Ali Karamat (1936–2022) was an Indian Urdu poet, author, literary critic, and mathematician. He was also a founding member of the Odisha Urdu Academy. Karamat is known for collecting and introducing Odisha's Urdu literature to the Urdu-speaking world. His works include Aab e Khizar (1963), Shu'aon Ki Salīb (1972), Izāfi Tanqīd (1977), Lafzon Kā Aasmān (1984), and Lafzon Kā Ākāsh (2000). Karamat received the 2004 Sahitya Akademi Translation Prize for his Urdu translation, Lafzon Kā Ākāsh.

== Early life and education ==
Karamat was born in Odia Bazar, Cuttack, on 23 September 1936, to Rahmat Ali Rahmat (1891–1963) and Wazeerun Nisa. Karamat's father was a year ahead of Subhas Chandra Bose (1897–1945) at Ravenshaw Collegiate School, and Bose and Rahmat placed first in their respective classes. Rahmat was a mathematician, an intellectual, and an Urdu poet.

Karamat learned to read the Quran, basic Urdu, and Persian from Muhammad Kāzim Sūngravi. He also learned Persian from his father, learned science and Odia literature from tutor Jadumani Rath, and developed a command of mathematics (particularly geometry). After finishing his primary education, Karamat completed his ninth standard at Khallikot Collegiate School in Berhampur and passed his 10th standard (matriculation) in the first division of Ravenshaw Collegiate School in Cuttack in 1952. In 1954, he passed the intermediate examination in the first division at Ravenshaw College in Cuttack. Karamat received Bachelor of Science and Master of Science degrees from Ravenshaw College in 1956 and 1958, respectively, and received a gold medal in addition to his master's degree.

In 1978, he began doctoral studies at Sambalpur University under the supervision of Mahendra Nath Mishra. Karamat's thesis on probability theory in mathematics was entitled "Some Properties of Random Equations", and he received his Ph.D. on 13 November 1982. American mathematician Albert Turner Bharucha-Reid included Karamat's research formulas from his thesis in his own book, Random Polynomials.

== Teaching career ==
Karamat joined the Odisha Educational Service as a lecturer in mathematics on 8 September 1958, and was a lecturer at S. K. C. G. College, Paralakhemundi. On 13 July 1959, he became a permanent lecturer in the department of mathematics at Ravenshaw College in Cuttack for a year. Karamat was a lecturer at S. K. C. G. College, Paralakhemundi, from 1961 to 1963, and lectured at Science College, Angul, from 1963 to 1966. He returned to Ravenshaw College, Cuttack, in 1966 as a lecturer and remained there until 1969. From 1969 to 1979, Karamat was a reader and chaired the department of mathematics at Sundargarh College in Sundargarh.

He was a reader at Khallikote College in Berhampur from 10 July to 10 November 1979. Karamat was then appointed principal of Kendrapara College, remaining there until 1980. He was a reader at Buxi Jagabandhu Bidyadhar College in Bhubaneswar from February 1981 to May 1982 and at Shailabala Women's College in Cuttack from June to October 1982. From October 1982 to 1986, Karamat was vice principal of Ravenshaw College. He was a professor and headed the mathematics department at Khallikote Autonomous College in Berhampur from February 1986 to 1989, and he was principal of the college until 1990. Karamat was appointed as the President of the State Selection Board in 1990 and retired from government service on 30 June 1995.

== Personal life ==
Karamat married Zubaida Ali, the second daughter of Abdur Rafiq Khan of Talpatak, Jagatsinghpur district, on 23 May 1959. They had one son, Qutub Kāmran, and three daughters: Sanobar Sultāna, Durr-e-Shehwār, and Rafī'a Rabāb. They also had five grandsons: Sārim Ali, Āsim Ali, Khurshīd Ālam, Adeeb Salmān, and Naqeeb Salmān, and three granddaughters: Saltanat Jahān, Pārsa Ambarīn, and Ramīza Faizi. In January 2005, he and Zubaida made Hajj. Zubaida died on 26 January 2020.

== Literary works ==
=== Poetry and criticism ===
Karamat had been interested in literature since he was a college student. Among his poetry teachers were Rehmat Ali Rehmat and Amjad Najmi. Karamat learned Arabic prosody from Manzar Hasan Desnavi at Ravenshaw College, and Mazhar Imam was his advisor for Urdu prose literature in Cuttack.

He wrote his first ghazal on 15 February 1953, and his first nazm (poem) on 31 December 1954. At the initiative of Mazhar Imam, Karamat collected poems by Odisha's Urdu poets and short biographical sketches and introduced them to the Urdu world in Aab e Khizar in 1963. In June 1965 (a year before the publication of Shabkhoon), he published the bi-monthly magazine Shakhsar in Cuttack; it was edited by Amjad Najmi.

Karamat presented Urdu criticism in a novel, rational way; his critical-essay collections include Izāfi Tabqīd (1977) and Naye Tanqīdi Masāʼil Aur Imkānāt (2009). He presented the theory of relativity, expanding the theory of relative criticism first used in Frederick Albert Pottle's book The Idiom of Poetry (1946). Pottle considered poetry as absolute and criticism as additional; however, Karamat considered both poetry and criticism to be additional.

Wahab Ashrafi wrote that Karamat has a special place in literature as a poet and critic, and his commitment to mathematics gives his criticism a new dimension. According to Unwan Chishti, Karamat's poetry has the colour and harmony of "contemporary awareness", which he has expressed by making the development of science and technology a part of consciousness. Gopi Chand Narang said that he has long been a believer in and admirer of Karamat's poetry, agreeing with Firaq Gorakhpuri that his writings compel reflection.

=== Translation ===
Karamat translated works by Odia poets and novelists into Urdu to bring the languages closer together. In addition to translating the Odia poems of Sitakant Mahapatra, he translated Shabdara Ākāsha (Mahapatra's poetry collection) into Urdu and received the Sahitya Academy Translation Prize (2004) from Gopi Chand Narang for Lafzon Ka Ākash in 2005. Karamat's other translations included poetry and fiction by Bidhu Bhusan Das, Sachi Routray, Chintamani Behera, Ramakanta Rath, Sourindra Barik, Brahmotri Mohanty, Pratibha Satpathy, Niranjan Padhi, Laxmi Narayan Mahapatra, Surendra Mohanty, Manoj Das, Gopinath Mohanty and Ramachandra Behera. Shamsur Rahman Faruqi said, "My indefatigable friend Karamat Ali Karamat, in addition to being a fine Urdu poet and critic, is also a tireless translator. He has done much to make Odia writers known to Urdu readers."

=== Awards and honours ===
In addition to the 2004 Sahitya Akademi Translation Prize, Karamat was recognised for his contributions to poetry, literature, and mathematics by the Urdu Academies of Bihar, Odisha, and Uttar Pradesh, the Najmi Academy in Cuttack, the All India Mir Academy in Lucknow, and the Odisha Mathematical Society. Azizur Rehman Aziz received his doctoral degree from Ranchi University, supervised by Wahab Ashrafi. Aziz's thesis was entitled Karāmat Alī Karāmat Ka Fikr o Fan (transl. The Thought and Art of Karamat Ali Karamat).

In 1990, A. Russell translated Karamat's Urdu poems into English in The Story of the Way and Other Poems with Jayant Mahapatra, Laxmi Narayan Mahapatra, Rajinder Singh Verma, Prafulla Kumar Mohanty, Sailendra Narayan Tripathy, P. Asit Kumar, Kamal Masoompuri, Zohra Jabeen, and M. A. Ahad. Selected Poems of Karāmat Alī Karāmat was published in 2012. Elizabeth Kurian Mona translated more of Karamat's poems in God Particle and Other Poems, and Anwar Bhadraki translated his Urdu poems into Odia as Ekānta ra swara (transl. The Outcry of Loneliness).

=== Books ===
Karamat's books include:

- Aab e Khizar: A 1963 collection of selected poems by Odisha poets, with short biographical sketches
- Shuāʻon Ki Salīb (1972)
- Izāfi Tabqīd (1977)
- Lafzon Ka Āsmān (1984)
- Lafzon Ka Ākāsh (2002)
- Shākh e Sanobar (2006)
- Naye Tanqīdi Masāʼil Aur Imkānāt (2009)
- Gulkada e Subh o Shām (2016)
- Kulliyāt e Amjad Najmi (2017)
- Māhir e Iqbāliyāt: Shaikh Habībullāh (2019)
- Odia Zabān o Adab: Ek Mutālaʻah (2020)
- Mere Muntakhab Pesh lafz (2021)
- The Story of the Way and Other Poems (translated in 1990 by A. Russell)
- Selected Poems of Karāmat Alī Karāmat (translated in 2012 by Jayanta Mahapatra and others)
- God Particle and Other Poems (translated in 2021 by Elizabeth Kurian Mona)
- Ekānta ra swara (translated into Odia by Anwar Bhadraki)

== Death ==
Karamat died on 5 August 2022 in Cuttack, while his funeral prayer was performed at Qadam Rasool, Dargah Bazar, Cuttack on 6 August and he was buried in the cemetery of Qadam Rasool.

== See also ==
- Amjad Najmi
- Abdul Mateen Jami
- Hafizullah Newalpuri
- Motiullah Nazish
