= Muslim Gazette =

Odisha's first Urdu-language newspaper

- Native name: ہفتہ وار مسلم گزٹ
- Type: Weekly newspaper
- Format: Eight-page broadsheet ("Blitz" size)
- Founder: Fazlur Rahman Qasmi
- Editor: Fazlur Rahman Qasmi
- Founded: 3 June 1937
- Ceased publication: 27 August 1937
- Language: Urdu
- Headquarters: Cuttack, Odisha (then Orissa)
- City: Cuttack
- Country: British India

Muslim Gazette (Urdu: Haftewar Muslim Gazette, ہفتہ وار مسلم گزٹ) was an Urdu-language weekly newspaper published from the province of Odisha (then Orissa) in 1937. Edited and founded by Fazlur Rahman Qasmi, the paper ran for a short period in 1937 and is represented today by a small set of surviving issues that have been used as a source for the history of Urdu journalism in Odisha.

== History ==
The Muslim Gazette was launched in June 1937 from Cuttack, Odisha (then Orissa) and was printed at Lakshmi Narayan Press in Cuttack. The first extant issue is dated 22 Rabi al-awwal 1356 AH (3 June 1937), and the available run of the newspaper consists of thirteen issues (seventy-two pages in total) covering dates from 3 June 1937 to 27 August 1937; the precise date on which publication ceased remains unclear. According to Amjad Najmi, the paper was initiated in the same year that Odisha became a separate province after its separation from the Bihar and Orissa Province, and was brought out by Syed Fazlur Rahman Qasmi as a commemorative effort marking that event.

The paper appeared on eight pages of newsprint (described as "Blitz" size, approximately 22 × 12 mm in the surviving records) and sold for one anna per issue (annual subscription reportedly three rupees). Its editor, Syed Fazlur Rahman Qasmi, came from a family active in Urdu literary journalism; his elder brother, Maulana Syed Muhammad Umar, had earlier published the monthly Al-Mansur (1930).

== Editorial stance and content ==
Surviving issues indicate the Muslim Gazette published local, regional and international news, editorials, appeals related to Muslim communal concerns, reports on the activities of the Indian National Congress and the Jamiat Ulema-e-Hind, as well as literary items and notices. Contemporary coverage shows the paper supported the national movement and advocated social, educational and economic improvement for Muslims of Odisha. The paper frequently urged readers to support Urdu education and suggested the establishment of public Urdu libraries across the province.

== Circulation and difficulties ==
The Muslim Gazette had a modest circulation and relied on limited financial resources. Its publishers repeatedly appealed to readers and patrons for small weekly donations (one anna per week) to sustain printing costs. By August 1937 the paper was in financial distress and soon thereafter ceased regular publication; the precise termination date has not been firmly established. Surviving copies were reported to be in a fragile state until later editorial and archival efforts preserved their contents.

== Preservation and later use ==
Thirteen extant issues passed through several private hands (including Hafizullah Newalpuri and Karamat Ali Karamat) before being edited and compiled in recent years. Khawar Naqeeb edited and published the surviving material in a 2023 work that collected the available issues and provided context on Urdu journalism in British India and Odisha in particular. The preserved pages are cited by scholars as primary evidence for the emergence of Urdu periodical journalism in Odisha.
