= Urdu Academy =

Indian language academy

Urdu Academy is the term used for various state academies, institutes and agencies set up by the respective governments for the promoting, preserving and developing Urdu language and the traditions and culture associated it.

== India ==
Most of these academies were constituted in 1970s, later in 1996 National Council for Promotion of Urdu Language was constituted as national level nodal agency for these agencies.

Following is the list of Urdu academies and organizations working for the promotion of the Urdu language and literature in India,

Academy	Establish	Website
Uttar Pradesh Urdu Academy	1972	Official Website
Bihar Urdu Academy	1972	Official Website
Maharashtra Urdu Academy	1975	Official Website
Karnataka Urdu Academy	1977	Official Website
West Bengal Urdu Academy	1978	Official Website
Delhi Urdu Academy	1981	Official Website
Andhra Pradesh Urdu Academy	1982	Official Website
Haryana Urdu Academy	1985	Official Website
Odisha Urdu Academy	1987	Official Website
Madhya Pradesh Urdu Academy	1978	Official Website
Rajasthan Urdu Academy	1979	Official Website
Chhattisgarh Urdu Academy	2003	Official Website
Gujarat Urdu Academy		Official Website
Punjab Urdu Academy	2005	Official Website
Telangana Urdu Academy	2014	Official Website
Jammu and Kashmir Academy of Art, Culture and Languages		Official Website
Academy of Professional Development of Urdu Medium Teachers, Jamia Millia Islamia		Official Website
Center for Professional Development of Urdu Medium Teachers, Maulana Azad National Urdu University		Official Website
Idara Adabiyat-e-Urdu, Hyderabad		
Abul Kalam Azad Oriental Research Institute, Hyderabad	1959	Official website
Ghalib Institute		Official Website
Anjuman-e-Taraqqi Urdu (Hind), New Delhi		Official Website
Ghalib Academy, New Delhi		Official Website
Anjuman-e-Islam Urdu Research Institute, Mumbai	1874	Official Website

== See also ==
- List of Islamic universities and colleges in India
