= Fazlur Rahman Qasmi =

Indian Islamic scholar, Urdu journalist and social activist

Maulana Fazlur Rahman Qasmi

Personal life
- Born: 1330 AH (c. 1912)
- Died: 1357 AH (c. 1938; c. 27 years)
- Home town: Dariapur, Sungra, Cuttack district, Orissa Province, British India
- Education: Madrasa Shahi, Moradabad
- Occupation: Journalist, Islamic scholar

Religious life
- Religion: Islam

Fazlur Rahman Qasmi (1330–1357 AH; c. 1912–1938) was an Indian Islamic scholar, Urdu journalist and freedom fighter. He was the editor of the weekly newspaper Muslim Gazette, which was launched in 1937 from Cuttack, in the then Orissa Province (present-day Odisha).

== Early life and education ==
Syed Fazlur Rahman Qasmi was born in 1330 AH (1911 or 1912). He belonged to the locality of Dariapur, Sungra, in Cuttack district. He received his education at Madrasa Shahi, Moradabad. During his studies, he was among the students who participated in activities associated with the Indian independence movement. Following his arrest in connection with the movement and serving two years of rigorous imprisonment, he returned to Moradabad and completed his remaining education.

== Career ==
During the 1930s, Qasmi participated in the Indian independence movement. While studying at Madrasa Shahi, Moradabad, he took part in activities associated with the freedom struggle. He was also injured during police firing at a protest against municipal elections in Moradabad, organised following a boycott call by the Indian National Congress and the local branch of Jamiat Ulama-e-Hind.

Following the arrest of his teacher, Muhammad Miyan Deobandi, Qasmi was entrusted with the latter's essay Islam ko kis ki chhuri ne zibah kiya hai? (Who slaughtered Islam with whose knife?). He travelled to Delhi and presented the essay at a gathering held at the Jama Masjid, Delhi, where he also delivered a speech against British rule. He was subsequently arrested and sent to Multan Jail, where he served two years of rigorous imprisonment.

During his studies at Madrasa Shahi, Moradabad, Qasmi proposed Anjuman Islahul Bayan to promote students' academic, literary and political development, particularly their speaking and writing skills and political awareness. The proposal was welcomed, and the organisation was established. Ashfaq Hussain Qasmi Moradabadi suggested its name, while Syed Fakhruddin Ahmad agreed to serve as its patron. Initially limited to Madrasa Shahi students, it was later renamed Anjuman Islahul Bayan Talaba-e-Suba-e-UP.

Qasmi was the editor of the weekly newspaper Muslim Gazette, which was launched in 1937 in Cuttack, Orissa. According to Hafizullah Newalpuri and Haqqani al-Qasmi, the newspaper marked the revival of Urdu journalism in Odisha.

Under his editorship, Muslim Gazette was an eight-page weekly newspaper. It published local, national and international news, commentaries on current affairs, political analyses, and reports on developments in Arab and Western countries. The newspaper also covered the activities of the Odisha branch of Jamiat Ulama-e-Hind.

In June 1937, Qasmi appealed to Islamic scholars in Orissa through Muslim Gazette to establish a provincial branch of Jamiat Ulama-e-Hind. In several editorials, he emphasised the need to organise the provincial branch and called upon the scholars to unite for its establishment. Jamiat Ulama-e-Orissa was established in the same year, and he was elected its Deputy General Secretary. He was also among those who subsequently served as its presidents.

== Death ==
Qasmi died in 1357 AH (1938 or 1939).
