= Khawar Naqeeb =

Indian Urdu poet and writer (born 1965)

- Born: Syed Mashooq Ilahi; 6 December 1965 (age 60); Daryapur, Sungra, Cuttack district, Odisha, India
- Occupations: Poet, prose writer, researcher, critic, journalist
- Writing career
- Language: Urdu
- Notable works: Salaakhon Ke Peechhe, Sareer-e-Khaama, Qalam-e-Firdous, Odisha Ka Pehla Urdu Akhbar
- Notable awards: Odisha Urdu Academy Award (1997), Najmi Academy Award, Swagatika Award, Cultural Sangam Academy Award

Khawar Naqeeb (born 6 December 1965) is an Urdu poet, prose writer, researcher, critic, and journalist from the Indian state of Odisha. He is the editor of the literary magazine Tarweej and the children's magazine Jugnu, and the author and compiler of several poetry, critical, and research books.

== Early and academic life ==
Khawar Naqeeb was born on 6 December 1965 in the locality of Daryapur, Sungra, Cuttack district, Odisha. His father, Syed Abdul Haleem Naqeeb, was a recognized poet of Odisha, and his elder brother, Syed Noor Elahi Natiq, is also a poet. After completing his education, he began teaching at the government institution Madrasah Alia, Cuttack, where he continues to serve. Among his mentors in poetry was Karamat Ali Karamat.

== Literary Life ==
Khawar Naqeeb began his literary career in 1982. He has written poetry in various genres, but he is particularly known for his nazms (poetic compositions in free verse or thematic verse), many of which have been translated into English, Arabic, Hindi, Odia, Kashmiri, and Punjabi. According to Motiullah Nazish, his poetry is noted for fresh imagery, distinctive metaphors and symbols, and thematic depth.

=== Publications ===
Khawar Naqeeb's notable books include:

- Salaakhon Ke Peechhe — The prison diary of Syed Muhammad Athar Nadir Sungravi (1995)
- Sareer-e-Khaama — A collection of selected letters written to him by eminent personalities, with annotations (2008)
- Qalam-e-Firdous — Poetry (2008)
- Urdu-e-Mu’alla — Masnavi (2010)
- Aawaaz Jaara Sewra — Compilation of Persian and Urdu translations of Sitakant Mahapatra’s Odia poems (2008)
- Dil Kush Urdu — Textbooks (Grades 1–6, jointly edited under the aegis of TE & SCERT, Government of Odisha)
- Dil Kush Farsi — Textbook (Grade 8, jointly edited)
- Dhanak — Research journal of Anjuman Taraqqi Urdu, Odisha (2010)
- Bayaaz-e-Rahmat — Poetry collection of Rahmat Ali Rahmat (compiled, 2014)
- Odisha Ka Pehla Urdu Akhbar — A research work on the Muslim Gazette (2023)

=== Research and Criticism ===
Khawar Naqeeb's work includes poetry, journalism, research, and criticism. He compiled Bayaaz-e-Rahmat, the poetry collection of Rahmat Ali Rahmat, and published several special issues of Tarveej on figures such as Faizi Sambalpuri and Aulad-e-Rasool Qudsi. Nazish describes his criticism as showing a keen understanding of poetic devices and embellishments.

=== Journalism and Literary Activities ===
Khawar Naqeeb preserved 13 issues of Odisha’s first Urdu newspaper, Muslim Gazette, and published them under the title Odisha Ka Pehla Urdu Akhbar. In this book, he also discusses in detail Urdu journalism during British India. As secretary of “Haida” and “Gulshan-e-Adab”, he worked for the promotion of Urdu language and literature. He is also the editor of the literary magazine Tarweej and the children's magazine Jugnu.

== Awards ==
Khawar Naqeeb has been honored with the following awards:

- Odisha Urdu Academy Award (1997)
- Najmi Academy Award
- Swagatika Award
- Cultural Sangam Academy Award
