= Shayar (poet) =

Writer of Hindustani poetry

A shayar is a poet who composes sher, or couplets, in Urdu poetry (Urdu: اُردُو شاعرى Urdu shayari). A shayar writes ghazals and nazms in the Urdu, Hindi, Punjabi & Bangla languages.

== History ==
Amir Khusro (1253–1325) composed the first ghazal in Urdu, titled ze-hāl-e-miskīñ. He wrote in Persian and Rekhta (initial form of Urdu). Mirza Ghalib is considered one of the leading literary authority on Urdu poetry. He lived in Delhi and died in 1869.

The literal meaning of shayar (shaa'ir) is poet. There are more than 30 types of Urdu poetry, also known as shayari. Examples of shayari are ghazal, sher, nazm, marsiya, qita and many more. Traditionally, that this form of poetry is often read to an audience in a special setting called mehfil. Although there are many professional shayars, who write shayari for their livelihood, it is an immensely popular form of poetry for younger generation. The inspiration for them to write shayari is largely romance and beauty. However, professional shayars tend to write more on social issues that is more popular for a larger section of society.

== List of shayars ==
- Mir Taqi Mir
- Amir Khusro
- Shams Tabrizi
- Baksh Nasikh
- Khwaja Haidar Ali Aatish
- Mirza Ghalib
- Mohammad Ibrahim Zauq
- Allama Iqbal
- Josh Malihabadi
- Rahmat Ali Rahmat
- Firaq Gorakhpuri
- Hasrat Mohani
- Jigar Moradabadi
- Jaun Elia
- Ali Sardar Jafri
- Mir Anees
- Mirza Dabeer
- Momin Khan Momin
- Mirza Sauda
- Daagh Dehlvi
- Faiz Ahmad Faiz
- Sahir Ludhianvi
- Shakeel Badayuni
- Majrooh Sultanpuri
- Karamat Ali Karamat
- Ahmad Faraz
- Hasrat Jaipuri
- Bashir Badr
- Kaifi Azmi
- Molana Inamur Rahman Inam Thanvi
- Javed Akhtar
- Muztar Khairabadi
- Nida Fazli
- Wasim Barelvi
- Gulzar
- Rahat Indori
- Mohammad Imran Pratapgarhi
- Sardar Anjum
- Munawwar Rana
- Ahmad Faraz
- Ada Jafri
- Amrita Pritam
- Meena Kumari
- Hasrat Mohani
- Faiz Ahmad Faiz
- Nasir Kazmi
- Wasif Ali Wasif
- Parveen Shakir
- Zamin Ali
