= Motiullah Nazish =

Indian Urdu-language poet and writer (born 1958)

Maulana Motiullah Nazish
- Born: Mohammed Motiullah; 25 November 1958 (age 67); Dewan Bazar, Cuttack, Odisha (formerly Orissa), India
- Education: B.A., Fazil-e-Hadith, Fazil-e-Urdu (M.A.)
- Alma mater: Utkal University; Wardha University, Maharashtra
- Occupations: Essayist, critic, author, poet, teacher
- Writing career
- Language: Odia, Urdu, Persian
- Years active: 1989–present
- Period: Modernism
- Genres: Poetry, prose writing, criticism, composition, teaching
- Notable awards: Amjad Najmi Award (2022)

Motiullah Nazish (born 25 November 1958) is an Indian Urdu-language poet, writer and educator, known for his contributions to Urdu prose and criticism. A founding member of the Odisha Urdu Academy, he has worked to promote Urdu literature and education in Odisha. His notable works include Aks-e-Baseerat, Odisha Mein Urdu Nasr Nigari, and Odisha Ke Mujahideen-e-Azadi.

== Early life and education ==
Motiullah Nazish was born on 25 November 1958 in Dewan Bazar, Cuttack, Odisha, to Muhammad Azad Khan and Qudrat-un-Nisa.

He received both secular and religious education. His religious studies were completed at Jamia Miftahul Uloom, Jalalabad, Uttar Pradesh, and he benefited from the spiritual guidance of Masihullah Khan, Asad Madani, and Qari Ameer Hasan in the Sufi traditions of Qadriya, Chishtiya, Suhrawardiya, and Naqshbandiya. He holds a B.A. degree, along with Fazil-e-Hadith and Fazil-e-Urdu (equivalent to M.A.).

== Career ==
Since 1978, Nazish has been engaged in teaching and learning activities. He is the principal of Madrasa Makram-ul-Uloom Husainiya, Odia Bazaar, Cuttack. From 1981 until his retirement in 2018, he served as a government school teacher of Urdu and Persian. He was the Head Molvi (Senior Teacher) at Ravenshaw Collegiate School, Cuttack, before retiring in 2018.

Nazish is the founding General Secretary of the All Odisha Urdu Teachers Association and one of the founding members of the Odisha Urdu Academy. He has also served as a member of the Odisha State Haj Committee and the Odisha State Board of Madrasa Education. In addition, he is the Vice President of the Urdu Writers Guild and Jamiat Ulema-e-Odisha (A) and has also served as the General Secretary (Nazim-e-'Umūmi) of Jamiat Ulema-e-Odisha.

He also established two madrasas in Cuttack, one in Odia Bazaar and the other in Kaisar Nagar. He played a pivotal role in establishing the Muslim Welfare Society in CDA (New Cuttack).

Nazish has contributed to curriculum development for Urdu and Persian textbooks from Grade 1 to Grade 10, including grammar and textbooks for the Diploma in Elementary Education.

His book Aks-e-Baseerat has been included in the Fazil-e-Urdu syllabus of the Odisha State Madrasa Education Board and the +3 (Urdu Honours) curriculum of Utkal University.

== Awards and honours ==
Nazish has been honored for his contributions to education, literature, and social welfare. These include the Odisha Swabhiman Award (1988), Sama Institute Award (2008), and the Minority Community Development Society Award (2011). He was also awarded the Najmi Academy Award in 2016 and was recognized by Sada-e-Odisha in 2019.

On 30 November 2022, he received the Amjad Najmi Award from the Odisha Urdu Academy in Bhubaneswar.

== Literary works ==
Nazish's literary journey began in 1989. Although he is better known as an essayist, he has also composed poetry, primarily ghazals and devotional works such as naats and hamds. His essays, spanning themes of criticism, religion, science, history, and sociology, are published in Urdu and Odia journals.

Karamat Ali Karamat (1936–2022) writes:

Motiullah Nazish's essays showcase diverse themes, including literary criticism, linguistics, religious issues, and biographical sketches of notable personalities within and beyond Odisha.

Nazish significantly contributed to advancing the tradition of documenting Urdu poets from Odisha, bringing it up to 2021. This work built upon the efforts initially carried out by Karamat and Hafizullah Newalpuri.

=== Books ===
Nazish wrote several works in poetry, criticism, and analytical writing, including:

- Hidayat-e-Haj (Guidance on Hajj, in Urdu and Odia)
- Aks-e-Baseerat (Collection of Critical Essays) – 2007
- Aks-e-Tahzeeb (Essays on Islamic Sociology) – 2015
- Odisha Mein Urdu Nasr Nigari (transl. Essays on Prose Literature of Odisha) – 2018
- Aks-e-Muashra (Essays on Islamic Sociology) – 2019
- Kashkol-e-Urdu Adab (Essays on Literature and Prose Poetry) – 2020
- Odisha Ke Mujahideen-e-Azadi (transl. The Freedom Fighters of Odisha, Historical Biographies) – 2023
- Nida-e-Waqt (Poetry Collection) – 2023
- Makhzan-e-Urdu Adab

== See also ==
- Amjad Najmi
- Abdul Mateen Jami
- Hafizullah Newalpuri
- Karamat Ali Karamat
