= Rana Vachhraj =

Hindu deity

Rana Vachhraj was a king of Lohar-Gadha in 13th century AD in what is now Afghanistan. Rana was the elder son of Rana Vasupal and elder brother of Rana Jashraj and their only sister Harkor.

== History ==
After the death of Rana Vasupal, as the elder son, Rana Vachchraj became king of Lohar-Gadha. But in battle a rabid dog bit his foot. To save himself from poisoning he chopped off the flesh. It made him permanently lame, and cost him his leg. Still local Afghan believe that the water of this monument can cure rabid dog bite.

Rana Vachchraj became a deity worshiped by the Lohana, Bhanushali, Khati Brahmin, and Saraswat Brahmin communities of Sindh, Gujarat.
