= Shakhsar =

Urdu magazine

- Native name: شاخسار
- Editor: Amjad Najmi
- Founded: June 1965
- Final issue: May 1973
- Country: India
- Based in: Cuttack, Odisha
- Language: Urdu

Shakhsar (Urdu: شاخسار, romanized: śāxsār, lit. 'thicket, grove, bower, garden, twigs, tree branches'), also spelt as Shaakhsaar, was an Urdu literary magazine published in Cuttack, Odisha, India, edited by Amjad Najmi. Initially, this magazine played a central role in connecting and introducing the literary world of Odisha to the Urdu world of India and outside India within a short period of time.

== History ==
In June 1965, a year before the publication of Shabkhoon, Karamat Ali Karamat started this bi-monthly magazine from Cuttack under the editorship of his teacher Amjad Najmi as the spokesperson of pure and healthy modernity.

The first issue was published in June–July 1965, and the last issue was published in May 1973.

On the contribution of Shakhsar to Urdu literature, Salman Raghib has written a thesis on the subject of "Contribution of Shakhsar to Urdu Literature" and obtained his Ph.D. from Utkal University in Bhubaneswar, Odisha, India. Some of Shakhsar's editorials and commentaries were published under the title "Shakhsar ke Idariye aur Tabsare" (transl. Shakhsar's Editorials and Commentaries) by Insha Publications, Kolkata.
