= Abdul Mateen Jami =

Indian Urdu poet and writer (1950)

- عبد المتین جامی
- Born: 27 July 1950 (age 76); Rasulpur, Sungra, Cuttack district, Odisha, India
- Occupations: Poet, writer, critic, translator
- Writing career
- Language: Urdu
- Genres: Poetry, fiction, criticism, translation
- Notable works: Nishat-e-Aagahi, Bisāt-e-Sukhan, Tarana-e-Javed, Monis-e-Sukhan, Purane Kapdon Ka Saudagar, Nayi Tanqeedi Jihatain

Abdul Mateen Jami (Urdu: عبد المتین جامی; born 27 July 1950), also written as Abdul Matin Jami, is an Indian Urdu poet, fiction writer, critic, and translator from Odisha. He has published multiple collections of poetry, fiction, and literary criticism, and has translated works from Odia, Bengali, and Malayalam into Urdu. He has received several awards for his contributions, including the Bihar Urdu Academy Award in 2014 and the Amjad Najmi Award from the Odisha Urdu Academy in 2022.

== Early life ==
Abdul Mateen Jami was born on 27 July 1950 in Rasulpur, Sungra, Cuttack district, Odisha, India. His father's name was Sheikh Sanaullah, and his mother's name was Umm-e-Salām. He began his literary journey in 1974.

== Literary career ==
Jami began writing poetry in 1976. His natural inclination has been towards modern poetry, and his mentor in poetry was his maternal uncle, Karamat Ali Karamat. He has explored a wide range of poetic forms, including ghazal, nazm (both traditional and free verse), prose poetry, triolet, sonnet, gajra, doha, and ruba'iyat (quatrains).

By the 1980s, Jami had composed around one hundred ghazals, many of which were published in prominent Urdu literary magazines and newspapers. His poetry appeared in publications such as Akhbar-e-Mashriq (Kolkata), Sada-e-Orissa, Adab-e-Nikhar (Mau Nath Bhanjan), Nai Naslen (Aligarh), Gul Kada (Sahaswan), Saaz-e-Sarmadi (Dehradun), and Chingari (Delhi). He was also actively involved in local literary activities in Cuttack.

He has published several poetry collections:

- Nishat-e-Aagahi (1996), his poetry collection
- Bisāt-e-Sukhan (2014), a collection of rubaiyat
- Monis-e-Sukhan (2016), a collection of rubaiyat
- Tarana-e-Javed (2016), a diwan of rubaiyat

He has composed over 1,500 rubaiyat, including experiments in free-form rubaiyat, and has explored various meters used in classical ruba'i composition.

Jami has also written fiction, including the short story collection:

- Purane Kapdon Ka Saudagar (2017), containing 20 stories, of which five are translations.

His fiction includes both traditional and modern symbolic narratives. In addition to short stories, Jami has written plays, verse dramas, and has contributed to journalism and critical writing.

== Literary criticism ==
Jami has written numerous critical essays. His collection Nayi Tanqeedi Jihatain (transl. New Critical Perspectives) was published in 2017 and discusses around twenty poets and prose writers.

He co-authored the book Urdu Adab Ka Koh-i-Noor: Karamat Ali Karamat (transl. The Koh-i-Noor of Urdu Literature – Karamat Ali Karamat) with Azizur Rahman, published in 2022 by the Odisha Urdu Academy.

== Translation ==
Jami has translated several literary works from Odia, Bengali, and Malayalam into Urdu. His Odia translations include stories by writers such as Padma Bhushan Manoj Das and Jnanpith awardee Pratibha Ray. He has also translated short stories from Bengali literature and rendered them into Urdu in an engaging style. Additionally, he translated a Malayalam short story by Thakazhi Sivasankara Pillai into Urdu under the title Do Suroopay.

== Awards and recognition ==
Jami has received several literary awards in recognition of his contributions to Urdu literature. These include the Hashmi Youth Development Association Award in Sungrah in 1997, the Najmi Academy Award and the Swagatika Award, both in Cuttack in 2000, and the Bihar Urdu Academy Award in 2014. On 30 November 2022, he received the Amjad Najmi Award (2021) from the Odisha Urdu Academy in Bhubaneswar.

== See also ==
- Odisha Urdu Academy
- Odisha
