= Odisha Urdu Academy =

Urdu Academy

Odisha Urdu Academy اڈیشا اردو اکادمی
- ଓଡ଼ିଶା ଉର୍ଦ୍ଦୁ ଏକାଡେମୀ
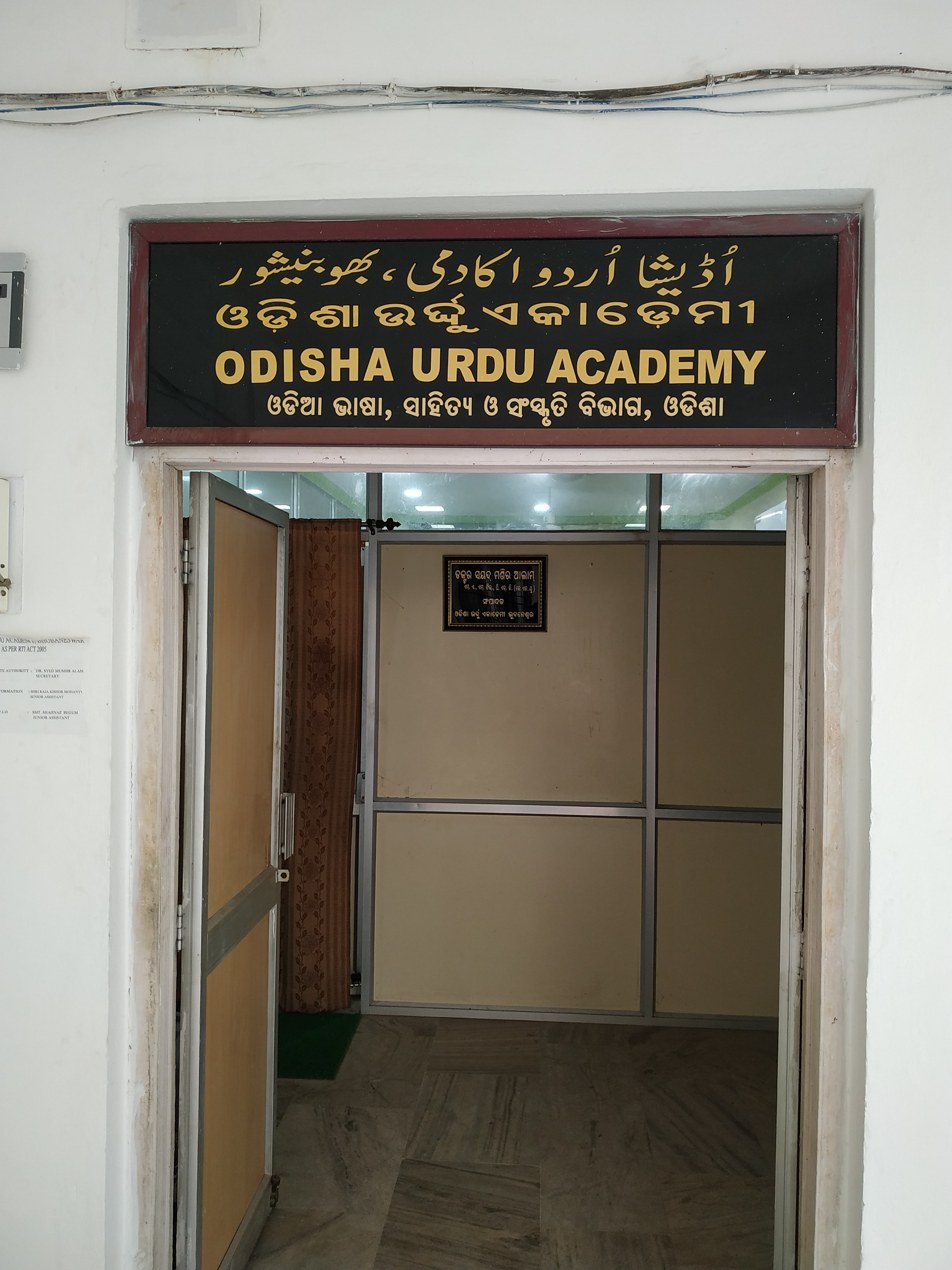
- Formation: 7 February 1987; 39 years ago
- Founded at: Bhubaneswar
- Location: Sanskruti Bhawan, BJB Nagar, Bhubaneswar, Odisha 751002
- President: Khalid Rahim
- Vice President: Syed Nafees Desnavi
- Previous Secretary: Syed Mushir Alam
- Current Secretary: Suchismita Mantri
- Website: Official website

Odisha Urdu Academy, or Odisha Urdu Akademi (Urdu: اڈیشا اردو اکادمی), formerly Orissa Urdu Academy, is an academy and institution in Bhubaneswar, the capital of the Indian state of Odisha, focusing on the promotion, development, and preservation of the Urdu language, its tradition, and culture in Odisha. It was formed on February 7, 1987, under the Societies Registration Act, 1860. This academy is established under the Department of Odia Language, Literature, and Culture, Government of Odisha.

== History ==
On February 7, 1987, the Urdu Academy was established in Odisha for the promotion and promotion of Urdu language and literature and the survival and protection of Urdu tradition and culture. This academy is established under the Department of Odia Language, Literature, and Culture, a branch of the Government of Odisha, and under the Societies Registration Act, 1860.

== Activities ==
Seminars, lectures, and literary talks are organized through the academy. "Urdu Learning Centers" (for adults) are being run in various districts of Odisha, under which the beneficiaries are trained to read, write, and speak Urdu for six months. Under the supervision of the Academy, the achievement of editing the Urdu-Odia dictionary containing fifty thousand words has been implemented, and this achievement has been accomplished under the auspices of the Dictionary Committee, whose chairman was Karamat Ali Karamat and whose editorial board included Hafizullah Newalpuri, Saeed Rahmani, Naseema Begum, and Motiullah Nazish.

Apart from the literary and cultural activities of the academy, the series of publications is also ongoing. Many important publications have been published, especially regarding Odisha, including Karamat Ali Karamat's Aab-e-Khizr (Remembrance of the Poets of Odisha), Odisha Mein Urdu Nasrnigari (Urdu prose in Odisha) and Odisha Ke Mujahideen-e-Azadi (The freedom fighters from Odisha) by Motiullah Nazish, and Saeed Rahmani's Odisha Mein Urdu Shayari (Urdu poetry in Odisha), etc.

In addition to these, S. M. H. Burney's Muhibb-e-Watan Iqbal (Iqbal: Poet – Patriot of India; 1984) was translated from Urdu to Odia under the name Desh Premi Iqbal (1988), an Urdu translation of the stories of some Odia writers, Odia Zaban Ke Numayinda Afsāne (Representative fictions of the Odia language; 2000), Karamat Ali Karamat's Odia Zaban o Adab: Ek Mutala (Odia Language and Literature: A Study; 2020), and Kulliyāt-e-Amjad Najmi (Amjad Najmi's poetry collection; 2017), a collection of Urdu translations of Sitakant Mahapatra's poems Awaaz-e Jarasaura (2008) and Urdu Adab Ka Koh-e-Noor Karamat Ali Karamat (Koh-e-Noor of Urdu Literature, Karamat Ali Karamat) by Azizur Rehman and Abdul Mateen Jami.

=== Awardees ===
The people who have been honored with awards by the Odisha Urdu Academy since its establishment in 1987 include the following recipients from different years:

- 1987: Abdul Rasheed Naqqad, Abdul Latif Arif, and Fazlullah Sharif Afzal Berhampuri
- 1988: Rishi Kant Parekh Rahi, Noorul Huda Qayed, Mahmood Balasori
- 1989: Karamat Ali Karamat, Hafizullah Newalpuri, and Khalid Rahim
- 1990: Syeda Maslahat Aizdi Maslahat, Hifzul Bari Hafiz, Sulaiman Khaki Berhampuri, and Sheikh Habibullah
- 1991: Yousuf Jamal, Abdul Majeed Faizi, Yousuf Pervaiz, and Shamsul Huda Shams
- 1992: Sajid Asar, Rashid Shabnam, and Shakeel Desnavi
- 1993: Saeed Rahmani, Sheikh Mubeenullah, and Khalid Shafai
- 1994: Ismail Azar, Maulana Abdul Masjood
- 1995: Ghulam Haider Nayab
- 1996: Ghayel Faridi, Abdus Samad Wasif
- 1997: Khawar Naqeeb
- 2021 (presented at a ceremony in 2023 after a 20-year gap):
  - Abdul Mateen Jami (Kendrapara) — Amjad Najmi Award 2021; prize: ₹3,00,000, trophy and citation.
  - Abdul Hafiz Bismil (Balangir) — Karamat Ali Karamat Award 2021; prize: ₹2,00,000, trophy and citation.
  - Afzal Baidar (Bhadrak) — Rashmikanta Rahi Award 2021; prize: ₹1,00,000, trophy and citation.
- 2022 (presented at the same ceremony in 2023):
  - Motiullah Nazish (Kendrapara) — Amjad Najmi Award 2022; prize: ₹3,00,000, trophy and citation.
  - Nasreen Nikhat (Cuttack) — Karamat Ali Karamat Award 2022; prize: ₹2,00,000, trophy and citation.
  - Shaukat Rashid (Balasore) — Rashmikanta Rahi Award 2022; prize: ₹1,00,000, trophy and citation.
- 2023 (presented at ceremony on 19 August 2025):
  - Seikh Anwar Hussain (Bhadrak) — Amjad Najmi Award 2023; prize: ₹3,00,000, trophy and citation.
  - Abdul Haque Betab (Cuttack) — Karamat Ali Karamat Award 2023; prize: ₹2,00,000, trophy and citation.
  - Samiul Haque Sakir (Cuttack) — Rashmikanta Rahi Award 2023; prize: ₹1,00,000, trophy and citation.

== Secretaries and publications ==
Syed Manzoor Ahmed Qasmi, the first secretary of the academy, has been the secretary of the academy for about ten years since the establishment of the academy, i.e., in 1987. During his time, the academy has developed a lot. He released the quarterly magazine Farogh-e-Adab from the academy in February 1987; later, its publication was stopped. Then, in June 2012, the former secretary of the academy, Dawood Rahman, took over the post, so he started publishing this magazine again in April 2013. From January 2016 until early 2025, the secretary of the academy was Syed Mushir Alam, who, according to Motiullah Nazish, had a high level of ability in Urdu and was well-versed in Urdu journalism, and the quality of literature promotion in his department increased immensely. According to Haqqani Al Qasmi, this magazine played an important role in the promotion of Urdu language and literature in Odisha, and established its identity in other areas besides Odisha. In 2025, Suchismita Mantri was serving as the Secretary of the Academy, and she coordinated the awards ceremony held at Sanskruti Bhawan in Bhubaneswar.
