= Rana Jashraj =

Hindu deity

Rana Jashraj was elevated to the name Veer Dada Jashraj and he was worshiped as kuladevata by the Bhanushali (Bansari ) in his sub cast Harwara and Lohana caste. In memory of Jashraj, Vasant Panchami (the fifth day of the spring season as per the Hindu calendar) is celebrated as a balidaani diwas (martyr day) of Veer Dada Jashraj.

Veer Dada Jashraj is a deity worshiped by Lohana, Bhanushali, Khatri, and Saraswat Brahmin community of Punjab, Sindh, Gujarat of the Indian subcontinent.

As per their folk tales, Jashraj, who lived around between 1205 and 1231, was at his wedding mandap when he learned that enemies were stealing cattle, the holy animal worshipped by Hindus. He left his fears and confronted his enemies to save the cattle. He was assisted in war by his sister Harkor. Although, the enemy from Kabul was eventually defeated, and Jashraj became victorious, he was killed as a result of an enemy stratagem. He has ever since been worshiped by Lohanas and Bhanushalis as Veer Dada Jashraj and his sister Harkor is worshiped as kuladevi by the Lohana clan.

However, Bhanushali (Bansari) and Lohanas today consider Dada Jasraj as their folk deity or kuladevata and there is a custom of giving offerings such as dates and jaggery to the idol of Dada Jasraj, who is shown riding a horse. Newlywed brides offer these to Dada Jasraj wearing colorful clothes. Previously it was prescribed to wear only white clothes, while offering puja, but this custom is now almost forgotten by the Lohanas.

== See also ==
- Rana Vachhraj
