= Wahab Ashrafi =

Indian literary critic

Wahab Ashrafi سید عبدالوہاب اشرفی Urdu Critic
- Born: 2 June 1936; Kako, Bihar
- Died: 15 July 2012 (aged 76); Patna, Bihar
- Occupation: Critic
- Writing career
- Pen name: Ashrafi, Wahab
- Genre: Criticism
- Subject: Urdu literature

Syed Abdul Wahab Ashrafi (Urdu/Persian/Arabic: سید عبدالوہاب اشرفی; Hindi: वहाब अशरफी) (2 June 1936 – 15 July 2012) was an Indian literary critic and an eminent personality in the world of Urdu literature. He belonged to the family of the Sufi saint Ashraf Jahangir Semnani.

== Early life ==
Ashrafi spent his early life in Kako village in Jehanabad district, Bihar.

== Education ==
Wahab Ashrafi received Ph.D. (Urdu), MA in Urdu (Gold Medalist), M.A in Persian (Gold Medalist), M.A (English), LLB.

He is an ex-Professor and Head-of-Department of the Dept of Urdu at Ranchi University. He is also an Ex-Professor in Department of Linguistic at Jawaharlal Nehru University (JNU), New Delhi.

He is ex-chairman, Bihar University Service Commission and ex-chairman, Bihar Intermediate Council, Patna. Vice–President of the progressive writer association, World.

== Arrested and jailed ==
Ashrafi, on the 5th of September 2004 was arrested by the Bihar Vigilance Department on the charges of faulty process in recruitment while serving as the Bihar University Service Commission Chairman. He was charged under various Sections of IPC Acts and Irregularities Acts. He was later released on bail by Supreme Court of India due to lack of evidence.

== Awards ==
- Sahitya Akademi Award for his book Tareekh-e-Adab-e-Urdu (Criticism) in 2007.
- Bihar Urdu Academy Award.
- Bharatiya Bhasha Parishad Award.

== Bibliography ==
Wahab Ashrafi wrote more than three dozen books some of which have been mentioned below

- Tareekh-e-Adabiyat-e-Aalam, 7 volumes
- Tareekh-e-Adab-e-Urdu, 4 volumes
- Falsafa Ishtirakiyat
- Qadeem Adabi Tanqeed
- Mani ki Talash
- Tafhimul Balagat
- Qutub Mushtari ka Tanqeedi Jayeza
- Mabaad-e-Jadidiyat
- Masnavi aur Masnavyat
- Aalmi Tehrik-e-Nisayat
- Qissa Be-simt Zindagi Ka
- Mera Mutala-e-Quran

Many of his books and works have been translated into other languages.

He was the editor of an Urdu literary magazine Mobahisa.
