= Lunar calendar =

Calendar based only on the Moon

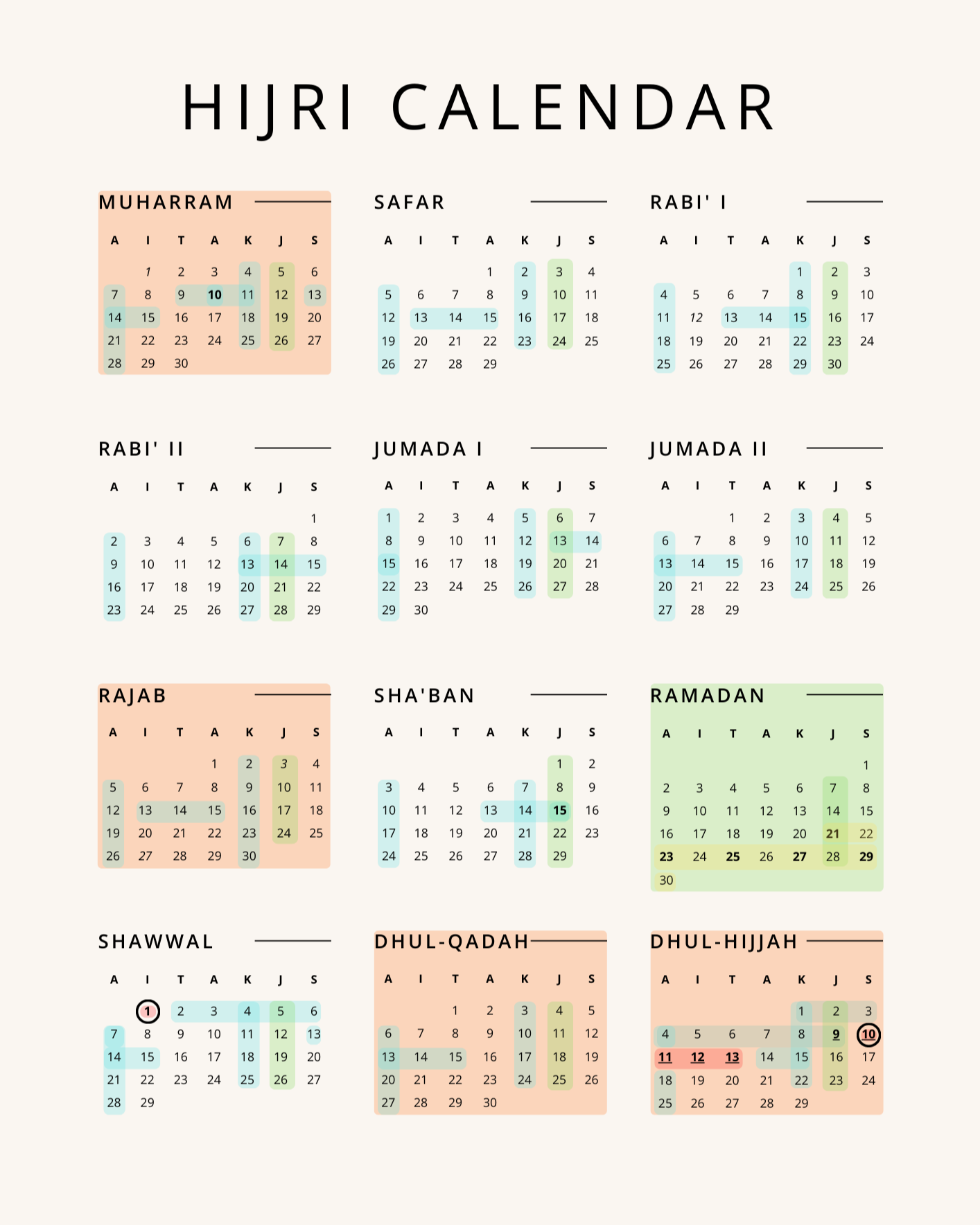
Tabular Islamic calendar

A lunar calendar is a calendar whose months record the cycles of the Moon's phases (synodic months, lunations). This in contrast to solar calendars, whose annual cycles are based on the solar year (which is about 11 to 12 days longer than twelve lunar months). It is also to be contrasted with lunisolar calendars, which also count lunar months but recover the accumulated differences by adding ("intercalating") a thirteenth leap month every few years. The most widely observed lunar calendar is the Islamic calendar. (Note: Iran operates Solar Hijri calendar, which is purely solar.)

Since each lunation is approximately 29 1/2 days, it is common for the months of a lunar calendar to alternate between 29 and 30 days. Since the period of 12 such lunations, a lunar year, is 354 days, 8 hours, 48 minutes, 34 seconds (354.36707 days), lunar calendars are 11 to 12 days shorter than the solar year. In lunar calendars, which do not make use of lunisolar calendars' intercalation, the lunar months cycle through all the seasons of a solar year over the course of a 33–34 lunar-year cycle (see, e.g., list of Islamic years). The details of when months begin vary from calendar to calendar, with some using new, full, or crescent moons and others employing detailed calculations. The term lunar new year is the first day of lunar calendar but is also widely used, especially in the US, of lunisolar new years.

== History ==
Scholars have argued that ancient hunters conducted regular astronomical observations of the Moon back in the Upper Palaeolithic. Samuel L. Macey dates the earliest uses of the Moon as a time-measuring device back to 28,000–30,000 years ago.

Since pre-historic times people have taken note of the Moon's phases and its waxing and waning cycle and used it to keep record of time. Tally sticks, notched bones dating as far back as 20–30,000 years ago, are believed by some to mark the phases of the Moon. The counting of the days between the Moon's phases eventually gave rise to generalized time periods of lunar cycles as months, and possibly of its phases as weeks.

The words for the month in a range of different languages carry this relation between the period of the month and the Moon etymologically. The English month as well as moon, and its cognates in other Indo-European languages (e.g. the Latin mensis and Ancient Greek μείς (meis) or μήν (mēn), meaning "month") stem from the Proto-Indo-European (PIE) root of moon, *méh_{1}nōt, derived from the PIE verbal root *meh_{1}-, "to measure", "indicat[ing] a functional conception of the Moon, i.e. marker of the month" (cf. the English words measure and menstrual). To give another example from a different language family, the Chinese language uses the same word (月) for moon as for month, which furthermore can be found in the symbols for the word week (星期).

This lunar timekeeping gave rise to the historically dominant, but varied, lunisolar calendars. The 7th-century Islamic calendar is an example of a purely lunar calendar, where months are traditionally determined by the visual sighting of the hilal, or earliest crescent moon, over the horizon.

Of particular significance has been the occasion of full moon, highlighted and celebrated in a range of calendars and cultures, an example being the Buddhist Vesak. The full moon around the southern or northern autumnal equinox is often called the harvest moon and is celebrated with festivities such as the Harvest Moon Festival of the Chinese lunar calendar, its second most important celebration after the Chinese lunisolar Lunar New Year.

In ancient Egyptian religion, Khonsu was the god both of the Moon and the passage of time, and his worship was heavily tied to the Egyptian lunar calendar.

== Start of the lunar month ==
Lunar and lunisolar calendars differ as to which day is the first day of the month. Some are based on the first sighting of the lunar crescent, such as the lunar Hijri calendar observed by most of Islam. Alternatively, in some lunisolar calendars, such as the Hebrew calendar and Chinese calendar, the first day of a month is the day when an astronomical new moon occurs in a particular time zone. In others, such as some Hindu calendars, each month begins on the day after the full moon.

== Length of the lunar month ==
The length of each lunar cycle varies slightly from the average value. In addition, observations are subject to uncertainty and weather conditions – in Sunni Islam, the month begins with Hilal, the actual observation of the first crescent. Thus, to minimise uncertainty, there have been attempts to create fixed arithmetical rules to determine the start of each calendar month. The best known of these is the Tabular Islamic calendar: in brief, it has a 30-year cycle with 11 leap years of 355 days and 19 years of 354 days. In the long term, it is accurate to one day in about 2,500 solar years or 2,570 lunar years. It also deviates from observation by up to about one or two days in the short term. The algorithm was introduced by Muslim astronomers in the 8th century to predict the approximate date of the first crescent moon, which is used to determine the first day of each month in the Islamic lunar calendar.

== List of lunar calendars ==
- Islamic Hijri calendar (Note: Calendar used by the large majority of Muslims outside Iran)
- Javanese calendar (Note: After 1633 CE reform)
- Māori calendar (Maramataka)
- The prehistoric Roman calendar is believed to have been a purely lunar calendar that later evolved into a lunisolar one, which in turn was replaced outright by the purely solar Julian calendar.

== Lunisolar calendars ==
Most calendars referred to as "lunar" calendars are actually lunisolar calendars. Their months are based on observations of the lunar cycle, with periodic intercalation being used to restore them into general agreement with the solar year. The solar "civic calendar" that was used in ancient Egypt showed traces of its origin in the earlier lunar calendar, which continued to be used alongside it for religious and agricultural purposes. Present-day lunisolar calendars include the Chinese, Korean, Vietnamese, Hindu, Hebrew and Thai calendars.

The most common form of intercalation is to add an additional month every second or third year. Some lunisolar calendars are also calibrated by annual natural events which are affected by lunar cycles as well as the solar cycle. An example of this is the lunisolar calendar of the Banks Islands, which includes three months in which the edible palolo worms mass on the beaches. These events occur at the last quarter of the lunar month, as the reproductive cycle of the palolos is synchronized with the moon.

== See also ==
- Epact – Age of a phase of the moon in days, and method
- List of calendars
- Lunar phase – Shape of the Moon's sunlit portion as viewed from Earth
- Lunisolar calendar – Calendar with lunar month, solar year
- Paschal Full Moon – Ecclesiastical full moon used to calculate the date of Easter
