= Harkor =

Hindu deity

Harkor is the Kuldevi of the Lohana clan. She is worshiped by Lohanas along with her brother Rana Jashraj.

As per their folk tales, Jashraj, who lived around between 1205 and 1231 near Lohar-gadha (present-day Lahore), was at his wedding mandapa when he realises that enemies were taking away cows, an animal holy to Hindus. Hearing this he left his wedding and went after the enemies with a group of warriors to save the cows. He was accompanied by his sister Harkor Pobaru, who led a group of Lohana women warriors.

Although, the enemy from Kabul was eventually defeated and Jashraj victorious, he was killed as the result of an enemy stratagem. Harkor also fell in the battle, becoming a martyr. Ever since both have been worshiped by Lohanas and Bhanushalis as kuladevata and kuladevi, respectively.

She is especially revered and worshiped as clan-deity by the Pobaru branch of Lohanas, into which she was married.

== See also ==
- Rana Vachhraj
