= Bhanushali =

Hindu agrarian community

Bhanushali (bhanshali)(bhansari)(bansari)
- Languages: Gujarati, Kutchhi, Marathi, Hindi, Sindhi
- Populated states: Gujarat, Maharashtra
- Subdivisions: AMAL AMIL Khaniya, Gori, Gajra, Bhadra, Joisar, Gajra, Mange, Shethia, Katarmal, Kataria, Chunda, Hurbada, Vador, Samasuya, Dabbha, Fuliya,Nakhua, Mav, Mengar, Harvara

Bhanushali is a trading or mercantile community mostly residing in Kutch district of the Indian state of Gujarat.Some are also found in the Saurashtra region and other parts of Gujarat. Some have also moved to Thane and Mumbai region of Maharashtra. They speak Kutchi language.

== Origins ==
Bhanushali is a descendant of Lord Rama's son Lav. The name "Bhanushali", translates to "Radiant sun" or "Bearers of the Sun ". Bhanushali is derived from the mythological king Bhanusal. The community was also known as Vegusor/Vagar after the place of Vegukot or Vegugad in Rann of Kutch.

Bhanushalis are mainly divided into three sections: Bhanushalis, Halari Bhanushali and Sindhi Bhanushalis. The caste is vegetarian. Bhanushalis have 96 exogamous sub-divisions, including Mange, Vadore, Gajra, Gori, Bhadra, Nanda and Harbala.

== History ==
Historically, the Bhanushalis had a strong presence in coastal trade and were known for their navigation skills. They were involved in transporting goods, spices, and other merchandise through sea routes, which contributed to the cultural exchange and economic prosperity of the regions they operated in. Jyotindra Jain theorized that the Bhanushalis migrated to Gujarat from Balochistan, based on their worship of Hinglaj Mata.He also believed that the Lohanas and Bhanushalis shared their early home in Sindh before their migration to Gujarat.

== Communities ==
Bhanushalis are at present divided into two subgroups, according to where they live. The Kutchhi Bhanushali community have ancestry in the Kutch region, and the Halari Bhanushali community have ancestry in the Halari (Jamnagar) region.

== Occupation ==
Bhanushalis are mainly involved in agriculture and farming and others who migrated are mainly involved in big businesses.

== Religion ==
Bhanushalis worship different kuldevis as per their clan names / surnames. They follow Hindu customs and beliefs. They also worship Veer Dada Jashraj and claim, like Lohanas, that he belonged to their community. Bhanushalis chiefly worship Hinglaj, whose main temple, Hinglaj Mata mandir is in Baluchistan, their ancestral home. They worship Karan from Mahabharta as Karan Dada.

== Lohanas ==
Bhanushalis shared their early home in Sindh with Lohanas and seem to share history. Like Lohanas, Bhanushalis are involved in trading and gained visibility in business. Like Lohanas they worship Dada Jashraj as their kuladevata and Harkor, as Kuldevi. Many Bhanushalis surnames are also found among Lohana community.

== Notable people ==
- Dhvani Bhanushali, Indian singer
- Jay Bhanushali, Indian television actor
- Kishore Bhanushali, Indian actor and stand-up comedian
- Kuntal Joisher, Indian mountaineer based in Mumbai
- Odhavram, torch bearer for educating Bhanushali Clan
- Shyamji Krishna Varma, Indian revolutionary fighter of Bhanushali community from Mandvi Kutch
