= Joisar =

Joisar Bhanushali
- Religions: Hindu Bhanushali
- Languages: Gujarati
- Populated states: Gujarat
- Region: Jamnagar

The Joisar (also spelt Joishar, Joisir, Joysar, Joysir, joyshar) are a sub-caste of the Bhanushali community in India.
