= Rahmat Ali Rahmat =

Indian poet and educator (1891–1936)

Moulvi Rahmat Ali Rahmat
- رحمت علی رحمت
- Born: 1891; Rasulpur, Cuttack district, Bengal Presidency (present-day Odisha, India)
- Died: 7 April 1963 (aged 71–72); Cuttack, Odisha, India
- Occupations: Teacher, poet, author
- Children: Karamat Ali Karamat (son)
- Writing career
- Language: Urdu, Odia, English
- Notable works: Jawahar al-Qawaid, Ganit Sopan, Beauties of Algebra

Rahmat Ali Rahmat (1891 – 7 April 1963) was an Indian educator, poet, and author associated with Urdu and Odia literature. He was a prominent mathematics teacher in Odisha and also wrote Urdu poetry characterized by elements of mysticism, humour, and social satire.

== Early life and education ==
Rahmat Ali Rahmat was born in 1891 in Rasulpur, Cuttack district, Bengal Presidency (now in Odisha). He received his early education in Urdu, Persian, and mathematics from his elder brother, Irfan Ali Fidai. After completing schooling at Ravenshaw Collegiate School, Cuttack (1908–1912), he passed the matriculation under University of Calcutta in 1912, the F.A. in 1914, and graduated in 1916. He completed his Licentiate in Training (L.T.) in 1918. During his school years, he was a contemporary and friend of Subhas Chandra Bose.

== Career ==
After completing his L.T. in 1918, Rahmat began teaching at Muslim Seminary School (now Sayeed Seminary) in 1919. In 1920, he entered government service and taught in various district schools, including Sambalpur and Puri. By 1935, he was appointed Headmaster of the Practising Middle School, Cuttack. Later, he was promoted as Special Inspecting Officer for Mohammedan Education (1943) and served as District Inspector of Schools (D.I.) in Balasore and Ganjam Plains until his retirement in May 1950.

His notable students include Sachidananda Routray, Hrudananda Ray, Rajkishore Ray, Gobinda Chandra Udgata, Nandini Satpathy, Surendranath Dwivedy, Sheikh Habibullah, and Sheikh Inayatullah.

== Literary works ==
Rahmat wrote several mathematics textbooks in Odia and English, which remained in the Odisha school curriculum for about four decades (1936–1976). These included Ganit Sopan, Probeshika Ganit Sopan, Bijoganit Sopan, Jyamiti Sopan, Man Sankha Mala, and Beauties of Algebra (1952).

He also authored Jawahar al-Qawaid, an Urdu grammar book, and translated Deputy Nazir Ahmad’s Taubat-un-Nasuh into Odia, which remains unpublished.

Rahmat's poetry reflects elements of Sufism, humour, and philosophical critique. Although influenced by Akbar Allahabadi and Deputy Nazir Ahmad, his works exhibit originality in tone and diction.

The book Cuttack, One Thousand Years mentions him among notable 20th-century Urdu writers and poets from Odisha.

== Personal life ==
Rahmat married twice. His first wife, Hajra Begum of Dariapur, Sungra, bore him one son and two daughters, of whom only Umm-e-Salam survived childhood. His second wife, Waziran Begum, was the daughter of Muhammad Ismail Khan of Talpatk. They had three sons and five daughters, including Karamat Ali Karamat, who became a noted Urdu poet and writer.

== Death and legacy ==
Rahmat Ali Rahmat died on 7 April 1963 and was buried near Azan Gah in the precincts of Qadam Rasool, Cuttack.

Rahmat’s contribution to education and Urdu literature in Odisha is recognized in several Urdu literary anthologies. Malik Ram noted that Amjad Najmi had benefited from Rahmat’s scholarship. In his autobiographical account, Najmi himself wrote that Rahmat was known as a distinguished teacher of both mathematics and Urdu literature. He mentioned that Rahmat authored an Urdu grammar book titled Jawahar al-Qawaid, written in a conversational style, which became widely popular soon after publication. Najmi described him as simple, modest, and deeply fond of the prose of Deputy Nazir Ahmad, the language of Daagh Dehlvi, and the humour of Akbar Allahabadi. He is also mentioned in Odisha Mein Urdu Shayari by Saeed Rahmani for his mastery of mathematics and humour in Urdu poetry.

== See also ==
- Karamat Ali Karamat
