= Andhra Pradesh Urdu Academy =

Mohammed Farooq Shubli was appointed Chairman of the AP. Urdu Academy on 26 Nov 2025

Urdu Academy, Andhra Pradesh
- Type: Academy
- Legal status: Registered Society
- Purpose: Literary and Cultural
- Headquarters: Vijayawada, Andhra Pradesh
- Location: Vijayawada, Andhra Pradesh
- Official language: Urdu
- Main organ: Academy, library, auditorium, publications
- Parent organization: Ministry of Minorities Affairs AP
- Affiliations: Registrar of Societies, (the then) Andhra Pradesh
- Website: Official Website
- Remarks: To serve the Urdu language in Andhra Pradesh.

Urdu Academy, Andhra Pradesh is an educational institution developing the Urdu language and preserving the Urdu tradition and culture in Andhra Pradesh. It was established in the year 1982. The main focus of the Academy was .

The academy is a subsidiary of the Ministry of Minorities affairs, and is under the direct control of the ministry as well.

== History ==
The former Andhra Pradesh government established this academy. It organized many cultural and educational programs. The academy's headquarters were in Vijayawada City.

In January 2018, the designation of its President and Vice President were changed to chairman and Vice- Chairman. Its budget is increasing from 29.9 million rupees to 58.6 million.

== Activities ==
The functions of the Academy are specified in the Memorandum of Association of the Constitution of Urdu Academy.

- Publication, translation and printing of publications.
- Research work, festivals, seminars, symposiums, mushairas and state level events.
- Honouring literary figures, awarding prizes, awards etc.,

== Publications ==
- Qaumi Zaban (Urdu bi-monthly magazine)
