= Shamsur Rahman Faruqi =

Indian Urdu language poet, author, critic, and theorist (1935–2020)

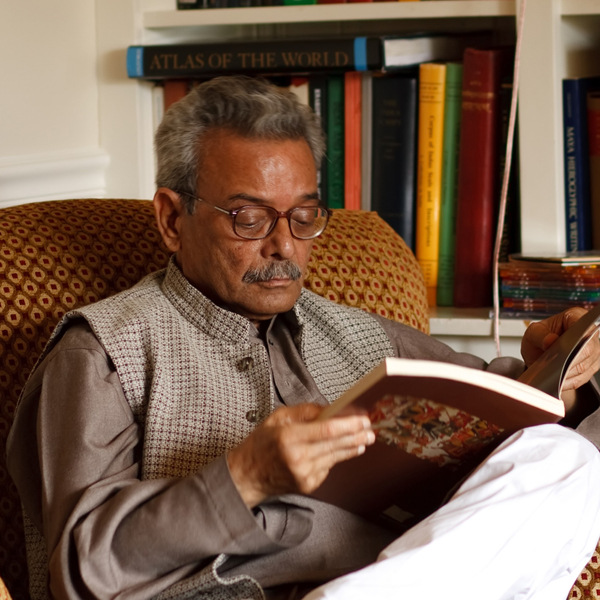
- Born: Shamsur Rahman Faruqi; 30 September 1935; Pratapgarh, United Provinces, British India (now in Uttar Pradesh, India)
- Died: 25 December 2020 (aged 85); Allahabad, Uttar Pradesh, India
- Resting place: Ashok Nagar, Allahabad, beside his wife
- Education: Allahabad University
- Occupations: Poet, critic
- Writing career
- Language: Urdu
- Notable works: Sher-e-Shor Angez; The Sun that Rose from the Earth; The Mirror of Beauty
- Notable awards: Sahitya Akademi Award (1986); Saraswati Samman (1996); Padma Shri (2009)

Shamsur Rahman Faruqi (30 September 1935 – 25 December 2020) was an Indian Urdu language poet, author, critic, and theorist. He is known for ushering modernism to Urdu literature. He formulated fresh models of literary appreciation that combined Western principles of literary criticism and subsequently applied them to Urdu literature after adapting them to address literary aesthetics native to Arabic, Persian, and Urdu. Some of his notable works included Sher-e-Shor Angez (1996), Ka’i Chand The Sar-e Asman (2006), The Mirror of Beauty (2013), and The Sun that Rose from the Earth (2014). He was also the editor and publisher of the Urdu literary magazine Shabkhoon.

Faruqi received the Padma Shri, India's fourth highest civilian honor in 2009. He was also a recipient of the Saraswati Samman, an Indian literary award, for his work Sher-e-Shor Angez in 1996, and the Sahitya Akademi Award in 1986 for Tanqidi Afkar.

== Early life and education ==
Faruqi was born on 30 September 1935 in Pratapgarh, in present day Uttar Pradesh and was raised in Azamgarh and Gorakhpur. He studied at Wellesley High School in Azamgarh and graduated from the Government Jubilee High School in Gorakhpur in 1949. He finished his intermediate education in 1951 from Mian Sahib Islamia Inter College, Bakhshipur in Gorakhpur.

He received his Bachelor of Arts degree from Maharana Pratap College in Gorakhpur and his Master of Arts (MA) degree in English literature from Allahabad University in 1955. He pursued a doctorate in English symbolism and French literature with the poet Harivansh Rai Bachchan as his supervisor but dropped out after a disagreement with Bachchan.

== Career ==
Faruqi began his writing career in 1960. He founded the Urdu literary magazine Shabkhoon in 1966 and was its editor and publisher for more than four decades. He was a visiting professor at the South Asia Regional Studies Center at the University of Pennsylvania. He was additionally employed by the Indian Postal Service until his retirement as a Postmaster General and a member of the Postal Services Board in 1994.

An expert in classical prosody and ‘ilm-e bayan (the science of poetic discourse), he contributed to modern literary discourse with a profundity rarely seen in contemporary Urdu critics. He was described as "the century's most iconic figure in the realm of Urdu literature". Some of his notable works included Tafheem-e-Ghalib, a commentary on Urdu poet Mirza Ghalib, Sher-e-Shor Angez, a four-volume study of the 18th-century poet Mir Taqi Mir and Kai Chand Thay Sar-e-Asmaan.

Faruqi is noted for ushering in modernism into Urdu literature through his works. He formulated fresh models of literary appreciation while Observing western principles of literary criticism, and subsequently applied them to Urdu literature after adapting them to address literary aesthetics native to Arabic, Persian, and Urdu. Through his works, he wrote about the Indian-Muslim way of life through the 18th and 19th centuries. As a progressive himself, he spoke against the burqa, hijab, and skull cap worn by conservatives, while continuing to emphasize the need for minority communities to express their own identity within democracies. He considered himself to be an outsider in the Urdu literary establishment, challenging the position of incumbent progressive writers for stifling other writers. He also emphasized the need for language to be a binding force for culture and communities and expressed his concerns that language had been reduced to a tool of identity. He said in an interview, "It is sad that language has become a tool of ownership and hegemony; not the thread that binds people together." His magazine, Shabkhoon (transl. Ambush at Night) between 1966 and 2006, aimed at publishing modernist Urdu literature and authors aiming to break the hegemony of the incumbent progressives.

Faruqi also translated many of his works into English. His 2013 novel, The Mirror of Beauty, was a translation of Kai Chand The Sar-e Asman, his 2006 Urdu novel. The book chronicled the life of Wazir Khanum, mother of late-19th-century Indian Urdu poet Daagh Dehlvi, and was set in that time's Delhi. The book was shortlisted for the DSC Prize for South Asian Literature. His 2014 novel, The Sun That Rose from the Earth, detailed the thriving Urdu literature scene in the Indian cities of Delhi and Lucknow of the 18th and 19th centuries, and resilience amidst the Indian Rebellion of 1857. There is no doubt that he was an iconoclast who was sometimes termed as TS Eliot of Urdu Literature.

=== Dastaangoi ===
In addition to his contributions to Urdu literature, Faruqi is credited with the revival of the Dastangoi, a 16th-century Urdu oral storytelling art form. The art form reached its zenith in the Indian sub-continent in the 19th century and is said to have died with the death of Mir Baqar Ali in 1928. Working with his nephew, the writer, and director Mahmood Farooqui, Faruqi helped to modernize the format and led its revival in the 21st century. Starting in 2004, Farooqui and his Dastangoi group performed in India, Pakistan, and the United States.

=== Translations ===
In 2011, Faruqi translated four urdu-language books from Ibn-e-Safi's Jasoosi Dunya series into English, which were published by Blaft Publications.

== Awards ==
He received the Sahitya Akademi Award in 1986 for his book Tanqidi Afkar, which focuses on modern theories of poetry appreciation. He was awarded the Saraswati Samman, an Indian literary award, for his work Sher-e-Shor Angez, a four-volume study of the 18th-century poet Mir Taqi Mir, in 1996. He was awarded the Padma Shri, India's fourth highest civilian honor, in 2009.

== Personal life ==
Faruqi met his future wife, Jamila Hashmi when she was a student in Allahabad pursuing her master's degree in English literature. She later set up and ran two girls' schools focused on the economically marginalized. The couple had two daughters. Jamila died in 2007 of complications from hip replacement surgery. Reflecting on the role played by his wife in advancing his career, Faruqi acknowledged that without her influence he would not have been able to invest his efforts in his magazine and stated that in consequence, "my struggle to become a writer of my kind would never have ended."

He died on 25 December 2020 in Allahabad due to complications from COVID-19. It was announced that he would be buried in the Ashok Nagar cemetery in Allahabad.

== Bibliography ==
- Sher, Ghair Sher, Aur Nasr, (1973)
- The Secret Mirror, (in English, 1981)
- Ghalib Afsaney Ki Himayat Mein, (1989)
- Tafheem-e-Ghalib
- Tanqidi Afqar (1982)
- Sher-e Shor Angez (in 3 volumes, 1991–93)
- Mir Taqi Mir 1722–1810 (Collected works with commentary and explanation)
- Urdu Ka Ibtedai Zamana (2001)
- Ganj-i-Sokhta (poetry)
- Sawar Aur Doosray Afsanay (2001)
- Kai Chand Thay Sar-e-Asmaan (2006)
- The Mirror of Beauty (2013)
- The Sun that Rose from the Earth (2014)
- Ajab Sehar Bayan Tha (2018) Published by M R Publications, New Delhi
- Hamarey Liye Manto Sahab (2013) Published by M R Publications, New Delhi
- Khurshid ka Saman e Safar (2016) Published by M R Publications, New Delhi
- Tanqidi Mamlat (2018) Published by M R Publications, New Delhi
- Majlis e Afaq main Parwana Saan (Collection of Poetry- 2018) Published by M R Publications, New Delhi
- Sorat o Ma'ani e Sukhan (2010, 2021) Published by M R Publications, New Delhi
- Sahiri Shahi Sahib e Qarani —Dastan Ameer Hamza ka Mutalea - Dastan Dunya -2, Vol. 5 (2020) Published by M R Publications, New Delhi
- Afsaney ki Nai Himayat Main (2021) Published by M R Publications, New Delhi

== See also ==
- List of Urdu language poets
- List of Urdu language writers
