= List of Islamic years =

This is a list of years in the Hijri era (Latin: anno Hegirae or AH) with the corresponding common era (CE) years where applicable. Years in this list are lunar years since the Hijrah, counted according to the lunar Hijri calendar (known in the West as "the Islamic calendar" (Note: There is more than one "Islamic calendar", though the Lunar Hijri calendar predominates. The other major one is the Solar Hijri calendar, which counts solar years since the Hijrah.)). For Hijri years since 1297 AH (1879/1881 CE), the Gregorian date of 1 Muharram, the first day of the year is given.

The first Hijri year (AH 1, the epoch of the era) was retrospectively considered to have begun on the Julian calendar date 15 July 622 CE, (Note: 1 Muharram of the new fixed calendar corresponded to Friday, 16 July 622 CE, the equivalent civil tabular date (same daylight period) in the Julian calendar. The Islamic day began at the preceding sunset on the evening of 15 July. This Julian date (16 July) was determined by medieval Muslim astronomers by projecting back in time their own tabular Islamic calendar, which had alternating 30- and 29-day months in each lunar year plus eleven leap days every 30 years. For example, al-Biruni mentioned this Julian date in the year 1000 CE. Although not used by either medieval Muslim astronomers or modern scholars to determine the Islamic epoch, the thin crescent moon would have also first become visible (assuming clouds did not obscure it) shortly after the preceding sunset on the evening of 15 July, 1.5 days after the associated dark moon (astronomical new moon) on the morning of 14 July.) denoted as "1 Muharram, AH 1". Years prior to this are reckoned in English as BH ("Before the Hijra").

In principle, each month in the lunar Hijri calendar begins with sighting of the new crescent moon (after a New Moon) at sunset. Because of this, the calendar is dependent on observational conditions and cannot be predicted or reconstructed with certainty. The tabular Islamic calendar, which determines the dates algorithmically, is used directly in some traditions and as an estimation in many computer systems. Because of this, dates may vary by up to two days between traditions or countries.

== Medieval ==
- c. 53 BH (c. 570 CE) Birth of Muhammad

=== Early Muslim conquests ===
- 1 AH (622/623 CE): (15/16 Jul 622 – 3/4 Jul 623)
- 10 AH (631/632 CE): death of Muhammad;
- 15 AH (636/637 CE): Muslim conquest of the Levant (AH 12–18),
- 20 AH (640/641 CE): Muslim conquest of Egypt (AH 19–21),
- 61 AH (680/681 CE): martyrdom of Husayn ibn Ali (Arabic: الحسين بن علي بن أبي طالب),

=== Islamic Golden Age ===
- 150 AH (767/768 CE)–650 AH (1252/1253 CE)

=== Ilkhanate ===
- 700 AH (1300/1301 CE)–900 AH (1494/1495 CE)

== Early Modern ==
=== Muslim Empires ===
- from 950 AH (1543/1544 CE)
- 990 AH (1582/1583 CE): declaration of the Gregorian calendar
- 1270 AH (1853/1854 CE): 3/4 Oct 1853– 23/24 Sep 1854.

== Modern ==
=== 1298 AH to 1399 AH (1880 to 1978 CE) ===
Islamic	Gregorian date of 1 Muharram (tabular schemes)	Observed
1298 AH	Sat 3/4 Dec 1880	
1299 AH	Wed Nov 23, 1881	
1300 AH	Sun Nov 12, 1882	
1301 AH	Fri Nov 2, 1883	
1302 AH	Tue Oct 21, 1884	
1303 AH	Sat Oct 10, 1885	
1304 AH	Thu Sep 30, 1886	
1305 AH	Mon Sep 19, 1887	
1306 AH	Fri Sep 7, 1888	
1307 AH	Wed Aug 28, 1889	
1308 AH	Sun Aug 17, 1890	
1309 AH	Fri Aug 7, 1891	
1310 AH	Tue Jul 26, 1892	
1311 AH	Sat Jul 15, 1893	
1312 AH	Thu Jul 5, 1894	
1313 AH	Mon Jun 24, 1895	
1314 AH	Fri Jun 12, 1896	
1315 AH	Wed Jun 2, 1897	
1316 AH	Sun May 22, 1898	
1317 AH	Fri May 12, 1899	
1318 AH	Tue May 1, 1900	
1319 AH	Sat Apr 20, 1901	
1320 AH	Thu Apr 10, 1902	
1321 AH	Mon Mar 30, 1903	
1322 AH	Fri Mar 18, 1904	
1323 AH	Wed Mar 8, 1905	
1324 AH	Sun Feb 25, 1906	
1325 AH	Thu Feb 14, 1907	
1326 AH	Tue Feb 4, 1908	
1327 AH	Sat Jan 23, 1909	
1328 AH	Thu Jan 13, 1910	
1329 AH	Mon Jan 2, 1911	
1330 AH	Fri Dec 22, 1911	
1331 AH	Wed Dec 11, 1912	
1332 AH	Sun Nov 30, 1913	
1333 AH	Thu Nov 19, 1914	
1334 AH	Tue Nov 9, 1915	
1335 AH	Sat Oct 28, 1916	
1336 AH	Wed Oct 17, 1917	
1337 AH	Mon Oct 7, 1918	
1338 AH	Fri Sep 26, 1919	
1339 AH	Wed Sep 15, 1920	
1340 AH	Sun Sep 4, 1921	
1341 AH	Thu Aug 24, 1922	
1342 AH	Tue Aug 14, 1923	
1343 AH	Sat Aug 2, 1924	
1344 AH	Wed Jul 22, 1925	
1345 AH	Mon Jul 12, 1926	
1346 AH	Fri Jul 1, 1927	
1347 AH	Wed Jun 20, 1928	
1348 AH	Sun Jun 9, 1929	
1349 AH	Thu May 29, 1930	
1350 AH	Tue May 19, 1931	
1351 AH	Sat May 7, 1932	
1352 AH	Wed Apr 26, 1933	
1353 AH	Mon Apr 16, 1934	
1354 AH	Fri Apr 5, 1935	
1355 AH	Tue Mar 24, 1936	
1356 AH	Sun Mar 14, 1937	
1357 AH	Thu Mar 3, 1938	
1358 AH	Tue Feb 21, 1939	
1359 AH	Sat Feb 10, 1940	
1360 AH	Wed Jan 29, 1941	
1361 AH	Mon Jan 19, 1942	
1362 AH	Fri Jan 8, 1943	
1363 AH	Tue Dec 28, 1943	
1364 AH	Sun Dec 17, 1944	
1365 AH	Thu Dec 6, 1945	
1366 AH	Mon Nov 25, 1946	
1367 AH	Sat Nov 15, 1947	
1368 AH	Wed Nov 3, 1948	
1369 AH	Mon Oct 24, 1949	
1370 AH	Fri Oct 13, 1950	
1371 AH	Tue Oct 2, 1951	
1372 AH	Sun Sep 21, 1952	
1373 AH	Thu Sep 10, 1953	
1374 AH	Mon Aug 30, 1954	
1375 AH	Sat Aug 20, 1955	
1376 AH	Wed Aug 8, 1956	
1377 AH	Mon Jul 29, 1957	
1378 AH	Fri Jul 18, 1958	
1379 AH	Tue Jul 7, 1959	
1380 AH	Sun Jun 26, 1960	
1381 AH	Thu Jun 15, 1961	
1382 AH	Mon Jun 4, 1962	
1383 AH	Sat May 25, 1963	
1384 AH	Wed May 13, 1964	
1385 AH	Sun May 2, 1965	
1386 AH	Fri Apr 22, 1966	
1387 AH	Tue Apr 11, 1967	
1388 AH	Sun Mar 31, 1968	
1389 AH	Thu Mar 20, 1969	
1390 AH	Mon Mar 9, 1970	
1391 AH	Sat Feb 27, 1971	
1392 AH	Wed Feb 16, 1972	
1393 AH	Sun Feb 4, 1973	
1394 AH	Fri Jan 25, 1974	
1395 AH	Tue Jan 14, 1975	
1396 AH	Sat Jan 3, 1976	
1397 AH	Thu Dec 23, 1976	
1398 AH	Mon Dec 12, 1977	
1399 AH	Sat Dec 2, 1978	

=== 1400 AH to 1499 AH (1979 to 2075 CE) ===
Islamic	Gregorian date of 1 Muharram (tabular schemes)	Observed
1400 AH	Tue/Wed 20/21 Nov 1979	
1401 AH	Sun Nov 9, 1980	
1402 AH	Fri Oct 30, 1981	
1403 AH	Tue Oct 19, 1982	
1404 AH	Sat Oct 8, 1983	
1405 AH	Thu Sep 27, 1984	
1406 AH	Mon Sep 16, 1985	
1407 AH	Sat Sep 6, 1986	
1408 AH	Wed Aug 26, 1987	
1409 AH	Sun Aug 14, 1988	
1410 AH	Fri Aug 4, 1989	
1411 AH	Tue Jul 24, 1990	
1412 AH	Sat Jul 13, 1991	
1413 AH	Thu Jul 2, 1992	
1414 AH	Mon Jun 21, 1993	
1415 AH	Fri Jun 10, 1994	
1416 AH	Wed May 31, 1995	
1417 AH	Sun May 19, 1996	
1418 AH	Fri May 9, 1997	
1419 AH	Tue Apr 28, 1998	
1420 AH	Sat Apr 17, 1999	
1421 AH	Thu Apr 6, 2000	
1422 AH	Mon Mar 26, 2001	
1423 AH	Fri Mar 15, 2002	
1424 AH	Wed Mar 5, 2003	
1425 AH	Sun Feb 22, 2004	
1426 AH	Thu Feb 10, 2005	
1427 AH	Tue Jan 31, 2006	
1428 AH	Sat Jan 20, 2007	20 January
1429 AH	Thu Jan 10, 2008	11 January
1430 AH	Sun/Mon/Tue 28/29/30 Dec 2008	28 December
1431 AH	Thu/Fri/Sat 17/18/19 Dec 2009	17 December
1432 AH	Tue/Wed 7/8 December 2010	6 December
1433 AH	Sun Nov 27, 2011 (Close to the Solar eclipse of November 25, 2011)	26 November
1434 AH	Thu/Fri 14/15 Nov 2012 (Close to the Solar eclipse of November 13, 2012)	15 November
1435 AH	Mon/Tue 4/5 Nov 2013 (Close to the Solar eclipse of November 3, 2013)	
1436 AH	Fri/Sat 24/25 Oct 2014 (Close to the Solar eclipse of October 23, 2014)	
1437 AH	Tue/Wed/Thu 13/14/15 Oct 2015	
1438 AH	Sun/Mon 2/3 Oct 2016	
1439 AH	Thu/Fri 21/22 Sep 2017	
1440 AH	Tue/Wed 11/12 Sep 2018	
1441 AH	Sat 31 Aug/Sun 1 Sep 2019	
1442 AH	Wed/Thu 19/20 Aug 2020	
1443 AH	Sun/Mon 9/10 Aug 2021	
1444 AH	Sat 30 July 2022	
1445 AH	Wed 19 July 2023	
1446 AH	Sun 7 July 2024	
1447 AH	Thu 26 June 2025 (Estimated date)	

== See also ==
- Islamic calendar
- Hijri year
- Tabular Islamic calendar
- Solar Hijri calendar
- Rumi calendar
