= Brahmotri Mohanty =

Odia poet (1934–2010)

- Born: 1934; Puri
- Died: 30 June 2010 (aged 75–76)
- Occupation: Writer
- Spouse: Bijaykrushna Mohanty
- Writing career
- Notable work: Drushtira Dyuti
- Notable awards: Sahitya Akademi Award

Brahmotri Mohanty (née Pattanayak) (1934 - 30 June 2010) was an Odia writer who wrote in Odia. She has written numerous collections of poems. She is best known for her poetry collection Drushtira Dyuti for which she won Odisha Sahitya Akademi Award in 1983.

== Personal life ==
She was born at Puri in 1934. She was married to the writer Bijaykrushna Mohanty. She died aged 76.

== Career ==
Her first poem was published in 1950. Her poems have been published in many Odia periodicals. Her first collection of poetry was published in 1972.

== Published works ==
- Mahanti, Brahmotri (2004). Cirantana = Chirantana (in Odia). ISBN 81-7400-398-3. OCLC 905490027.
- Mahanti, Brahmotri (2001). Pradakshina (in Odia). Odisa Buk Shtora. ISBN 81-7400-324-X. OCLC 51265034.
- Mahanti, Brahmotri (1995). Srotasvati (in Odia). Odisa Buk Shtora. ISBN 81-7400-120-4. OCLC 38898490.
- Mahanti, Brahmotri (1972). Abatarana (in Odia). Je. Mahapatra. OCLC 46465539.
- Mahanti, Brahmotri (2002). Uttarana (in Odia). Granthamandira. OCLC 51163634.
- Mahanti, Brahmotri (2003). Nirikshana (in Odia). Sahitya Sangraha Prakasana. OCLC 55078535.
