= Sachidananda Routray =

Indian (Odia-language) Writer (1916-2004)

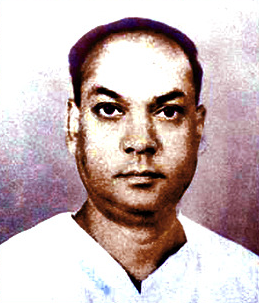
- Sachidananda Routray
- Born: 13 May 1916; Gurujang, Bihar and Orissa Province, British India
- Died: 21 August 2004 (aged 88); Cuttack, Orissa, India
- Writing career
- Pen name: Sachi Rautara
- Genre: Poetry
- Notable work: Pallisri
- Notable awards: Jnanpith Award

Sachidananda Routray (13 May 1916 – 21 August 2004) was an Indian poet, novelist and short-story writer who wrote in Odia. He received Jnanpith Award, the highest literary award of India, in 1986. He was popularly known as Biplabi Kabi (revolutionary poet) Sachi Routray.

== Life ==
Routray was born in Gurujang, near Khurda on 13 May 1916. He was brought up and educated in Bengal. He married a Telugu princess from the royal family of Golapalli.

Routray started writing poems from the age of eleven. He was also involved in freedom struggle while in school. Some of his poems were banned by British Raj for revolutionary content. He died in Cuttack on 21 August 2004.

== Works ==
He started his writing career through " patheya " (1st poetry) in 1932.In 1943, Routray became very famous among Odia readers when he published Baji Rout, a long poem that celebrated the martyrdom of a boatman boy who succumbed to the bullets of British police when he refused to take them in his rickety boat to cross the river Brahmani. He was a prolific poet and published as many as twenty anthologies. His Pallishri, dealing with village life in Odisha, is as successful as his poem Pratima Nayak that portrays the suffering and the predicament of a city girl. He belonged to a group of writers who called themselves 'poets of the people'.

Routray also published a few poems with religion as their theme.

"Chhota Mora Gan Ti" was written by Routray. This topic is now taught by most of the teachers in Odisha.

== Awards and recognitions ==
- Padmashree in 1962.
- Sahitya Akademi Award in 1963 for the poetry Kabita-1962.
- Soviet Land Nehru Award in 1965.
- Jnanpith Award in 1986.

Lifetime fellowship (kendra sahitya academi) - 1988 " Mahakabi " samman-1986 - Rourkela, 1988 - Cuttack President - Nikhil Bharat Kabita Sammelan - Kolkata (1968), Rourkela (1988) Sahitya Bharati Award - 1997

== See also ==
- List of Sahitya Akademi Award winners for Odia
- Jnanpith Award
- List of Indian poets
