= Hafizullah Newalpuri =

Indian Urdu writer, translator, and educator (1936–2019)

- حفیظ اللہ نیولپوری
- Born: 5 January 1936; Newalpur, Cuttack district , Bihar and Orissa Province, British India (now part of Jajpur district, Odisha)
- Died: 8 May 2019 (aged 83); Cuttack, Odisha, India
- Resting place: Qadam e Rasool, Cuttack
- Education: M.A. (Urdu), Fazil (Persian), B.Ed., M.Phil., Ph.D.
- Alma mater: Bihar University, Utkal University, Jawaharlal Nehru University
- Occupations: Writer, translator, educator
- Writing career
- Language: Urdu, Odia, Hindi, Bengali, English, Persian
- Genres: Prose, translation, criticism, biography
- Notable works: Odisha Mein Urdu, Taboot Ki Sada, Sirf Tumhare Liye
- Notable awards: Odisha Urdu Academy Award (1989)

Hafizullah Newalpuri (1936–2019), also written as Hafeezullah Newalpuri, was an Indian Urdu-language prose writer, translator, researcher, and educator from Odisha. He authored fiction, critical essays, translations, biographies, and research-based works, and was noted for his multilingualism and literary versatility.

== Early life and education ==
Hafizullah Newalpuri was born on 5 January 1936 in Newalpur which was then part of Cuttack district in Orissa (now in Jajpur district, Odisha). He completed his M.A. in Urdu at Bihar University and earned a B.Ed. from Utkal University. He earned an M.Phil. in 1980 from Jawaharlal Nehru University (JNU) under Mohammad Hasan with a thesis titled Mughal Tamasha ka Tajziyati Pehlu (The Analytical Aspect of Mughal Tamasha).

In 1982, he was awarded a Ph.D. for his thesis titled Odisha Mein Urdu, under the supervision of Mohammad Hasan. This work was later published by the National Council for Promotion of Urdu Language (NCPUL) in 2001.

== Career ==
Newalpuri joined the Odisha Education Service as a Class I officer and retired as Head of the Department of Urdu and Persian at Ravenshaw College, Cuttack. He served as an external examiner for multiple Ph.D. and D.Litt. viva voce examinations at L.N. Mithila University.

== Literary works ==
Newalpuri began his literary career in 1955 with a short story published in the children's magazine Phulwari (Delhi).

Newalpuri contributed to the Urdu monthly Aaj Kal during the 1970s and 1980s. His published work in the magazine included articles on the establishment and development of Urdu libraries in Odisha, the state of Urdu journalism in the region, literary profiles of Muslim writers from Odisha, and the growth of novel writing in the state. He also authored a research-based article on Mughal Tamasha and its relationship with the Urdu stage in Odisha. In addition to critical essays, his contributions included a translation of a poem by Sourindra Barik from Odia, and a review of the Urdu poetry collection of Muhammad Sharafuddin Sāhil titled Bayān Merathi: Hayāt-o-Shā'irī.

He also wrote character sketchs (khāke), blending vivid description with subtle wit. A notable example appears in his preface to Shakh-e-Sanobar, a poetry collection by Karamat Ali Karamat, where he sketches the poet's personality through lively imagery and everyday references—such as describing him sipping tea while immersed in thought.

According to Motiullah Nazish, his body of work includes approximately 30 short stories, 72 research articles, 79 essays, 25 literary papers, and 20 critical reviews.

=== Translations ===
Newalpuri was a multilingual translator. He translated from Odia, Bengali, and English into Urdu. His notable works include:

- Taboot Ki Sada – translations of poems by Niranjan Padhi from Odia (1991)
- Sirf Tumhare Liye – translated from Manorama Biswal Mohapatra's Odia poems (1994)

He also translated Bengali stories such as Balu Ghat ki Machhli and Odia fiction like Nachiketa ka Haath. These were noted for blending linguistic features of both the source and target languages.

=== Books ===
His notable works include:

- Odisha Mein Urdu (Research, 2001)
- Taboot Ki Sada (Translation, 1991)
- Sirf Tumhare Liye (Translation)
- Cuttack: As Known from Persian Sources (English)
- Oriya–Urdu Dictionary (Compiler)
- Harf-e-Aarzoo (Compilation of congratulatory poems by the country's eminent poets on the occasion of Khalid Rahim's inauguration ceremony)
- Orissa Library Ke 20 Saal (Booklet)

== Death ==
Newalpuri died on 8 May 2019 at his residence in Cuttack after a prolonged illness. He was buried the same day at Qadam e Rasool cemetery.

== See also ==
- Karamat Ali Karamat
- Odisha Urdu Academy
