= Gajra =

Flower garland worn in the hair or on the wrist by South Asian women

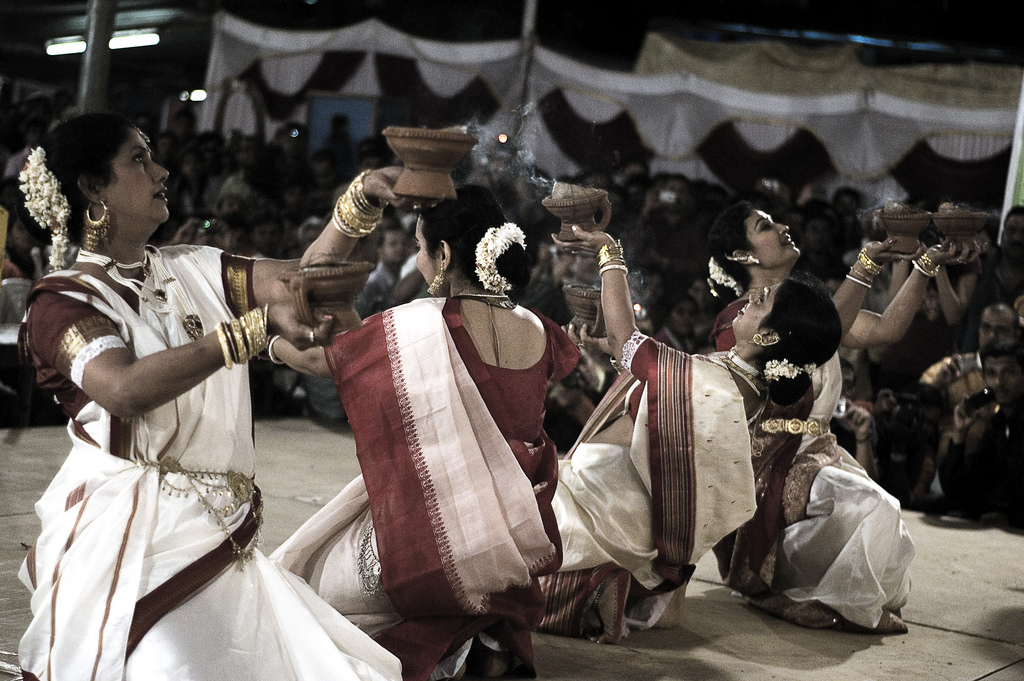
Gajra are traditionally worn around hair bun.

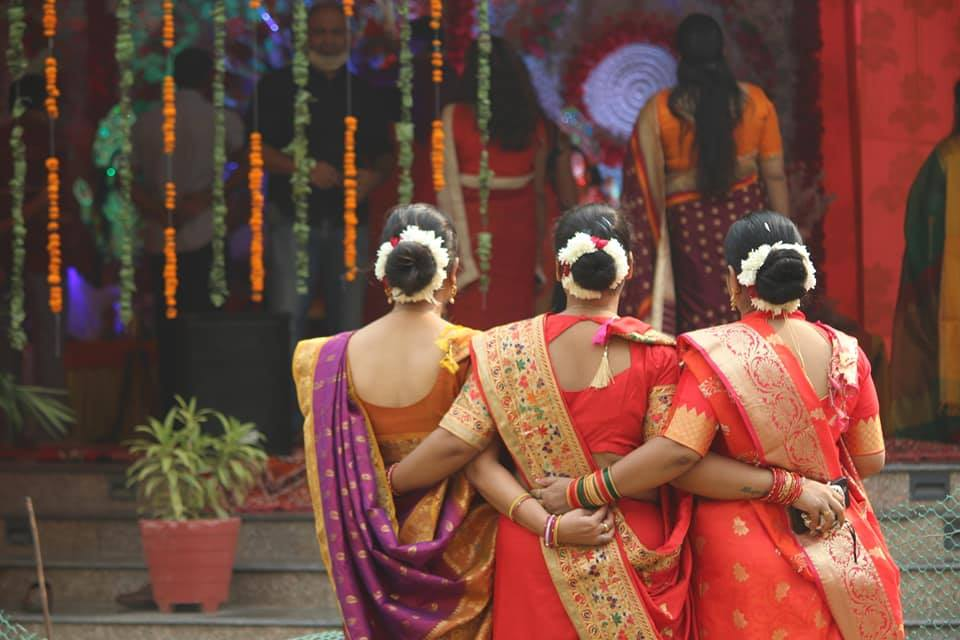
Indian Ladies with Gajra during religious Function

A Gajra is a flower garland that is worn by women in India, Nepal, Sri Lanka, Bangladesh and parts of Pakistan during festive occasions, weddings, or as part of everyday traditional attire. They are made usually of varies types of jasmine flowers but rose, crossandra and barleria are also widely used in gajras. It can be worn both on the bun and with the braid coiling. Women in South India, Maharashtra, Gujarat usually wear them with traditional attire. It is also worn on the wrist mainly during festive occasions and weddings.

The gajra is an ornament to decorate a hairstyle and does not generally aid in holding a bun in place. Gajra also refers to a type of pearl workmanship done on jewelry in India.

== Gallery ==
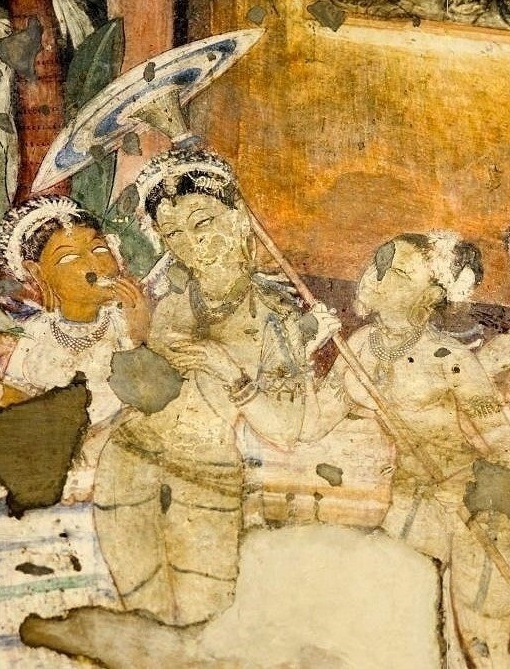
Historically, jasmine gajra has been worn around hair bun, Gupta Empire.

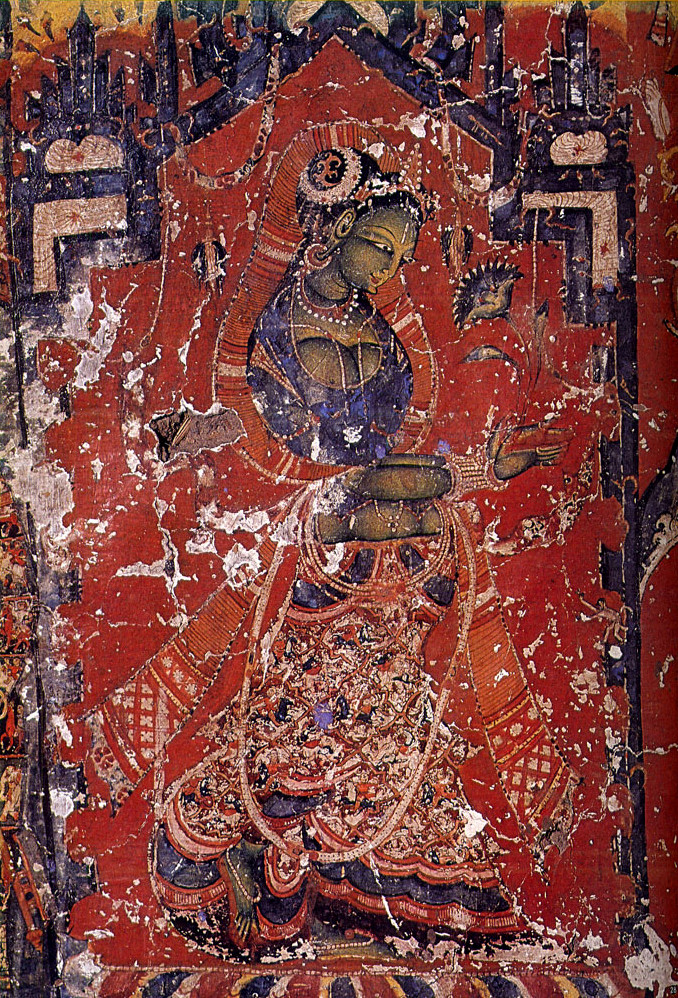
Green Tara with jasmine gajra around hair bun. ca. 11th century A.D.

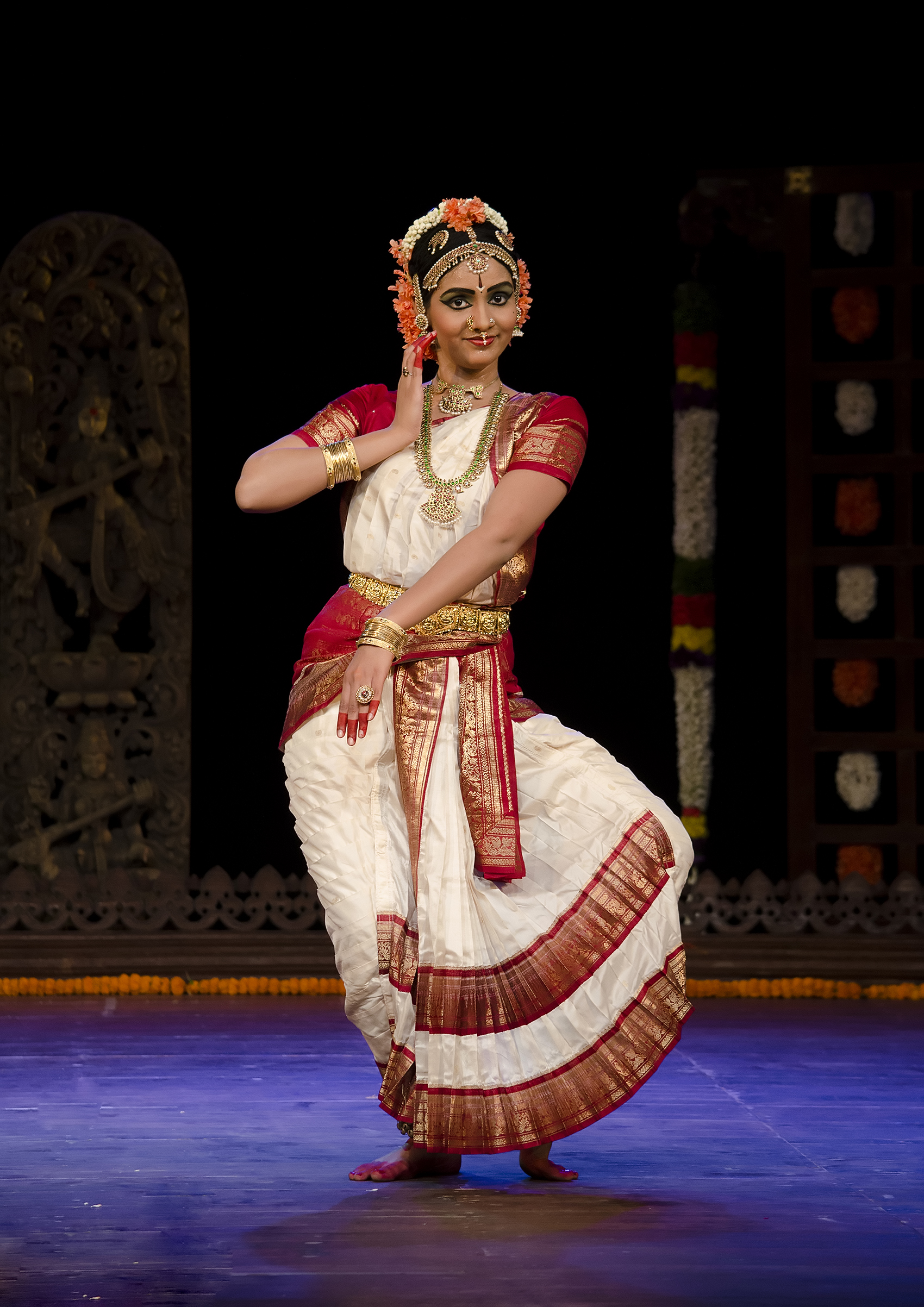
Kuchipudi dancer with gajra.

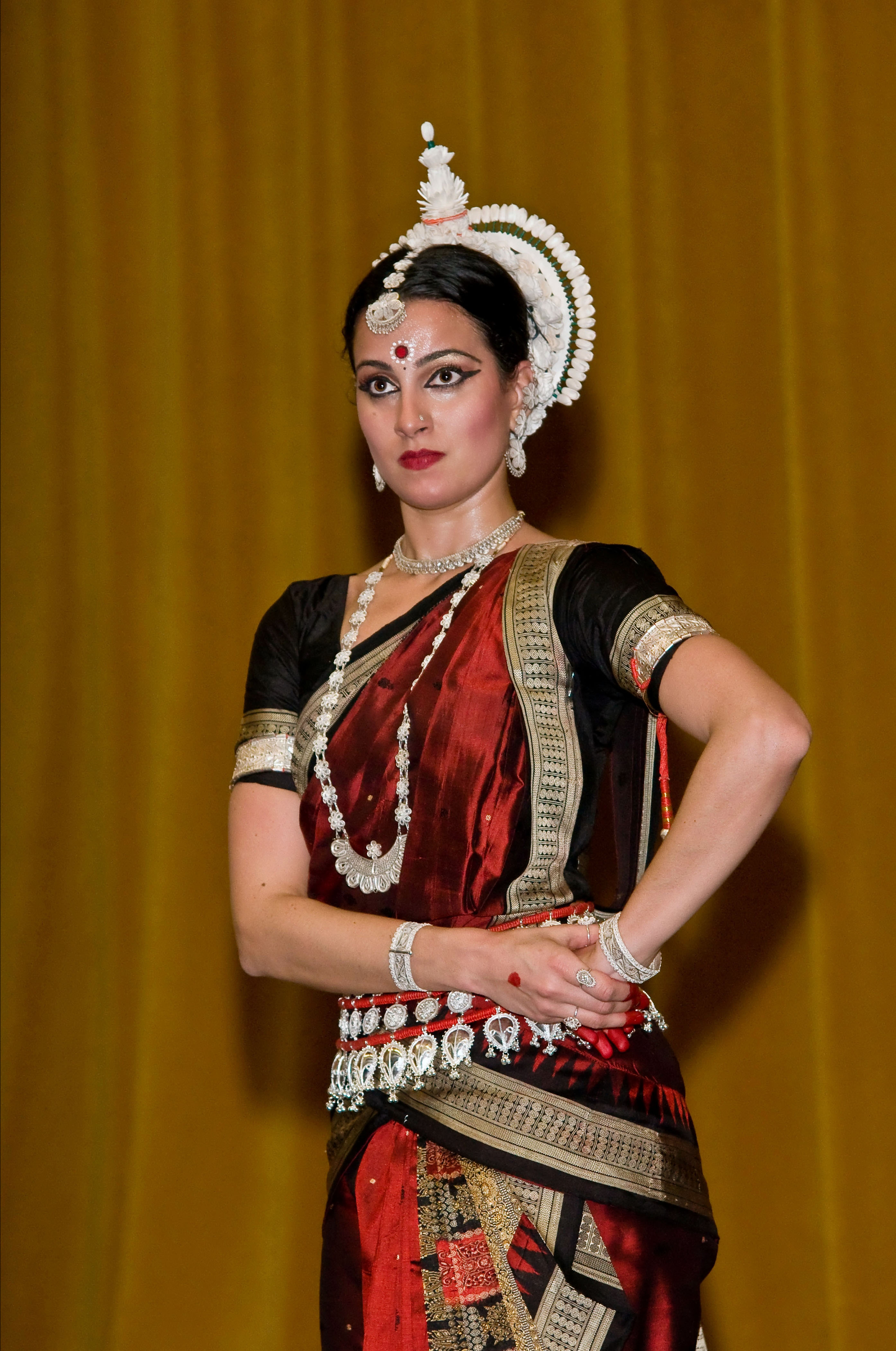
Traditional imitation Gajra is made from Sholapith plant-based sponges and are worn by Odissi dancers.

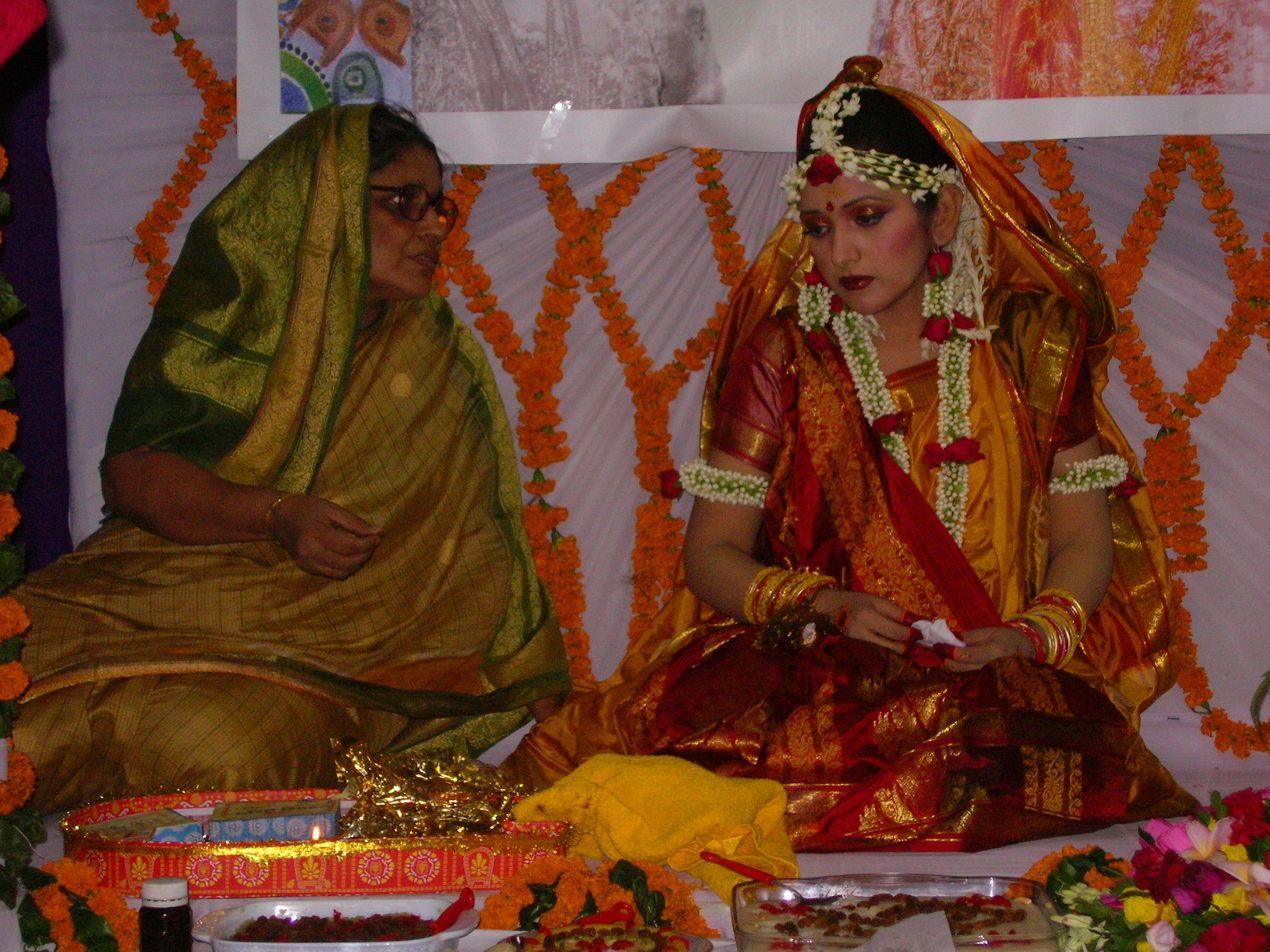
Bride with floral decorations for Haldi, Mehandi or Sangeet ceremony, part of pre-wedding rituals in South Asia.

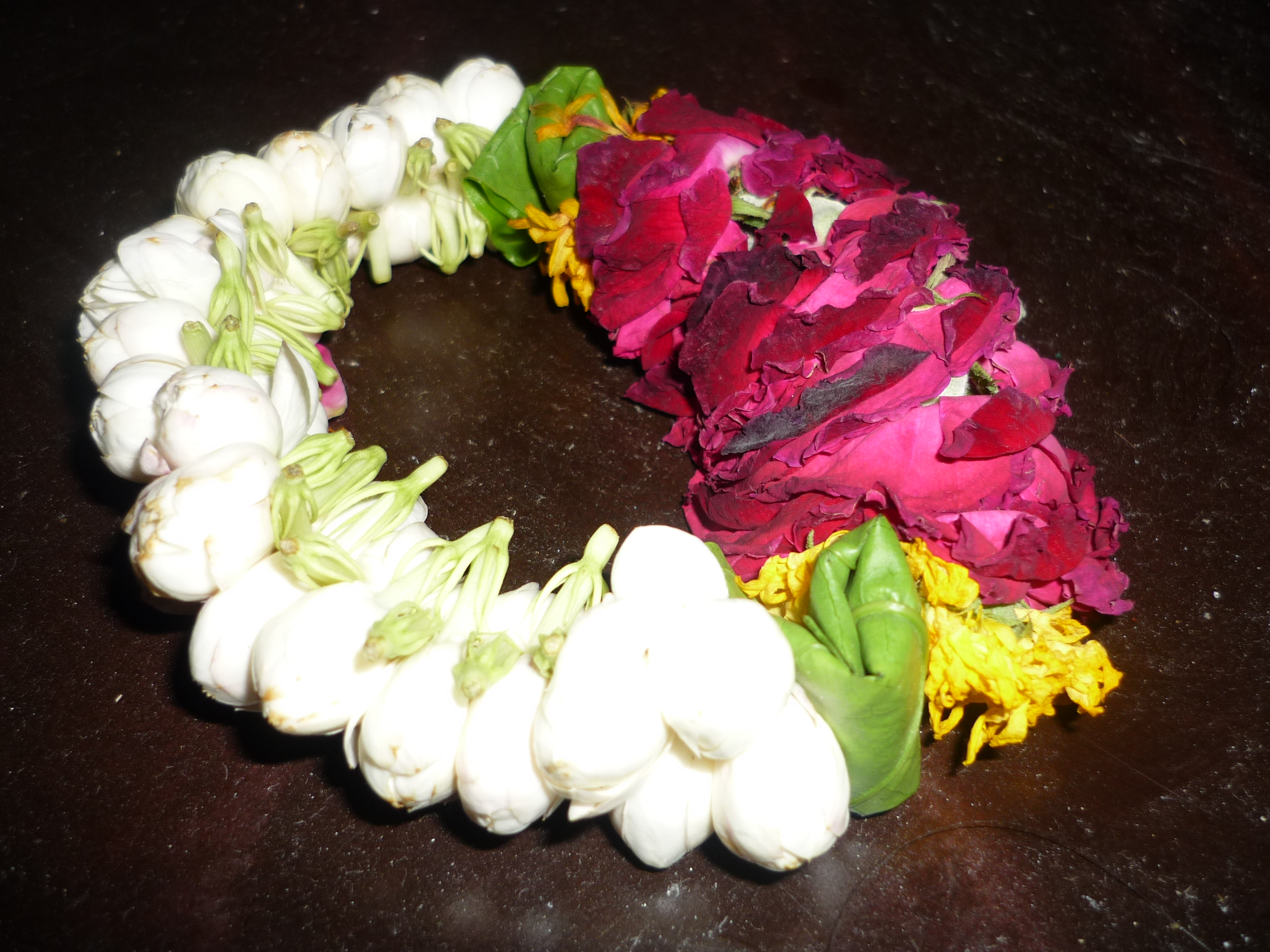
Gajra worn around wrist in Pakistan
