= Shabkhoon =

Urdu magazine

- Native name: شب خون
- Editor: Shamsur Rahman Faruqi
- Former editors: Ejaz Hussain
- Founded: June 1966
- Final issue: June 2006
- Country: India
- Based in: Allahabad, Uttar Pradesh (present-day Prayagraj, Uttar Pradesh)
- Language: Urdu

Shabkhoon (Urdu: شب خون, romanized: śab-xūn, lit. 'night attack, blood of night, nocturnal blood') was an Urdu literary magazine started in June 1966 in Allahabad (present-day Prayagraj), Uttar Pradesh, India. The magazine was founded and edited by poet and author Shamsur Rahman Faruqi who used to work on it along with his job at the Indian Postal Service. The journal covered the modernist (jadīdiyat) voice in the Urdu literature at a time when the literary scene was dominated by progressive literature (taraqqī-pasand) and was hailed as "the harbinger of modernism in Urdu". The magazine was calligraphed by a scribe (katīb) Salimullah Naiyer. Forty years after being started, the journal was published for the last time in June 2006. Though it was popular, it ceased publication owing to editor Shamsur Rahman Faruqi's failing health.

Describing the support of his wife Jamila Faruqi, Rehman said:

Without Jamila, there would have been no Shabkhoon and without Shabkhoon my struggle to become a writer of my kind would never have ended.

— Shamsur Rehman Faruqi, in a conversation with Mayank Austen Soofi

== Origins ==
Faruqi initially thought of naming the Magazine Teesha (lit. 'axe, adze') associated with Farhad, a stonemason in the Persian romance Khosrow and Shirin, who had to cut through a mountain. Finally, Shabkhoon (surprise attack by night) — an allusion to "shaking the world of [Urdu] literature out of stasis" — was decided upon. The magazine was financially supported by Faruqi's wife Jamila. It was published for the first time in June 1966 with the progressive writer Ejaz Hussain as its first editor.

== Notable Contributors ==
The magazine became so popular that progressive writers started contributing to the magazine. The magazine also published works of Pakistani writers. Some of the notable contributors include:

- Adil Mansuri
- Ali Sardar Jafri
- Anwar Sajjad
- Asif Farrukhi
- Balraj Komal
- Intizar Hussain
- Ismat Chughtai
- Rajinder Singh Bedi
- Zafar Iqbal
