= Amjad Najmi =

Indian poet (1899–1974)

Najm ash-Shu'ara, Shayer-e-Orissa Amjad Najmi
- Born: Shaikh Muhammad Amjad; 29 October 1899; Buxi Bazar, Cuttack, Bengal Presidency, British India
- Died: 1 February 1974 (aged 74); Cuttack, Orissa (now Odisha), India
- Citizenship: British India India
- Education: Metriculation
- Alma mater: Peary Mohan Academy, Cuttack
- Occupations: poet, dramatist, writer
- Writing career
- Language: Odia, Urdu, Persian
- Years active: 1916–1974
- Period: Progressive Writers' Movement, Jadīdiyat
- Genres: Poetry, Drama
- Notable works: Tulu-e-Sahar; Joo-e-Kahkashan

Amjad Najmi (1899–1974) was an Indian poet, dramatist, prose writer, and nationalist. He has contributed to the development of the Urdu language in Odisha and Andhra Pradesh.

== Early life and education ==
Amjad Najmi was born on 29 October 1899, in Buxi Bazar, Cuttack. His father, Muhammad Yousuf Yousuf (d. 1924), was an Urdu poet, and besides Urdu, he also had good skills in Odia, Persian, and English.

He received his early education at Madrasa Islamia Buxi Bazar, Cuttack, and the Roman Catholic Middle English School. The head of the Roman Catholic school and an Odia poet, Pandit Shyam Ghan Narayan, tutored him in Odia poetry when he was only thirteen to fourteen years old.

In 1916, he was admitted to the Peary Mohan Academy, Cuttack, for his 10th examination, where he began to study Urdu and Persian regularly and, at the same time, trained for a year in poetry with Habibullah Tasnim Jaipuri, an imam of Paltan Masjid, Buxi Bazar, Cuttack.

After Habibullah Tasnim Jaipuri moved to Rangoon, keeping his name hidden, he started taking corrections from his father, Muhammad Yusuf Yusuf, and at the same time, he also benefited a little from Rahmat Ali Rahmat (d. 1963), father of Karamat Ali Karamat. He was influenced by the poet of the East, Muhammad Iqbal, on the basis of which he wanted to seek reform from Iqbal through correspondence. But Iqbal avoided him as usual and advised him to study the collections of the senior poets. Later, when he developed a passion for poetry in Persian, he consulted Shamsuddin Shams Muneeri, when Muneeri was residing in Cuttack as a law lecturer at Ravenshaw College.

== Career ==
When he was matriculating, the movements of Khilafat and non-cooperation spread all over India; students were saying goodbye to the school and college, and he also joined the same movement. He used to recite his poems and others' poems in programs.

He also met Mahatma Gandhi at the time, when Gandhi first visited Orissa (now Odisha) in March 1921. At the same time, Najmi was jailed, and when he was released, his father sent him to his uncle in Ranchi. After a year, when he returned to Cuttack, he got a job on the railways there, and then he worked in 1922. In the same year, he founded Bazm-e-Adab in Cuttack with some regional and non-regional poets, whose first Mushaira was held on 1 July 1923, in Madrasa Sultania, Cuttack.

In 1924, he was stationed at Guru Jatia (now Gurudijhatia), Cuttack, and in 1926, at Rajathgarh, Cuttack. At that time, in 1928, he founded the Young Muslim Club in Jatni, Khorda, under which plays were performed. In 1938, he moved to Waltair, Visakhapatnam, so he established Bazm-e-Adab there with the support of some friends, of which he was also president from 1941 to 1954 and which was named later the All-Andhra Urdu Majlis, which still continues the sense for poetry and literature among the Urdu-speaking classes there.

After retiring from his work, Najmi returned to Cuttack in October 1954. He was asked to take on the role of president of Bazm-e-Adab, Cuttack, which he did, serving in that capacity until he fell out with the Majlis administration. He gave up his position as president. He was a follower of Muhammad Iqbal in poetry and Agha Hashar Kashmiri in drama.

In 1954, he retired from service on a pension; the pension was meager. Therefore, the government of Odisha issued him a literary stipend of Rs. 50 per month. At the same time, he also established a school named City Commercial School to teach typing and stenography, earned some income from this, and also earned a living by stone carving.

From 1965 to 1973, he was the editor-in-chief of the monthly Shakhsar. Also, he compiled his father Muhammad Yousuf Yousuf's poetry collection, Nakhat-i-Bagh-i-Yousuf, which is still unpublished.

=== Poetry and drama ===
Najmi first started writing poetry in Odiya during her school days, inspired by Radhanath Ray and Madhusudan Rao. In 1916, he started formal ghazal poetry, and by 1920, he had mastered Urdu, Odia, Persian, and English. He had a strong grasp of these four languages and mastered poetry in Persian. However, according to Karamat Ali Karamat, the ghazals written from 1916 to 1920 were excluded from Najmi's collection, so don't be safe.

In 1961 and 1969, his two poetry collections were published under the names Tulu-e-Sahar and Joo-e-Kahkashan, respectively, which were compiled by Karamat Ali Karamat. In 2017, Karamat published Najmi's published and unpublished poetry under the name Kulliyat-i-Amjad Najmi.

In 1916–17, Najmi turned to acting and playwriting inspired by Agha Hashar's style, appeared on the formal stage in 1921, and by 1928 began directing plays.

From 1928 to 1938, he was so busy with dramas that he started neglecting poetry to some extent. He has played a major role in beautifying, refining, and popularizing the Urdu stage in Odisha. He wrote four plays: Badnaseeb Badshah, Kaamyaab Talwar, Kishore Kanta, and Insaf Ka Koda. These plays are still unpublished.

=== Correspondence ===
According to Hafizullah Nawalpuri's statement, another aspect of Najmi's prose writing and literary importance is his correspondence. His letters written on various topics were compiled by him in 1966 under the name Sarir-e-Qalam and have not been published until now. However, many of his letters have been published in the monthly Shakhsar, Cuttack, and in Rahnuma-e-Taleem, Delhi.

== Honors and positions ==
In his memory, the Najmi Academy, a literary and welfare-registered institution in Odisha, has been founded, through which the Najmi Award is given to poets and writers of various languages besides Urdu each year. In his honor, a library is also named Najmi Library.

In 1988, Nuruddin Ahmed wrote a book in English called The Brightest Heaven on Najmi's thought and art, and in addition, Ahmed, under the supervision of Muhammad Qamaruddin Khan, wrote a thesis in English on Western influence on the poetry of Iqbal and Najmi and obtained a doctorate degree from Utkal University. Similarly, Masihullah Masih completed his doctorate by writing a thesis titled The Life and Work of Amjad Najmi in 1980, under the supervision of Prof. Samiul Haq.

Shaikh Quraish had published a special issue of his journal, Sada-e-Orissa, Najmi Number. Also, Najmi's poetry collection Joo-e-Kahkashan is included in the syllabus of MA (Urdu) at the Universities of Odisha and Fazil-e-Urdu at the Odisha State Board of Madrasa Education (OSBME).

In 1954, Najmi was honored with the title of Najm ash-Shu'ara (transl. Star of Poets) by the All Andhra Urdu Majlis at the annual conference held at Machilipatnam in recognition of his poetic excellence and his literary services. Shamsuddin Shams Muneeri, in his poetry collection Gulbang, vouched for a stanza of Najmi and mentioned him as Shayer-e-Orissa (transl. the poet of Orissa) in the margin.

== Death ==
Amjad Najmi died on 1 February 1974, and was buried at Qadam-e-Rasool Graveyard in Dargah Bazar, Cuttack.

== See also ==
- Karamat Ali Karamat
