= Bihar Urdu Academy =

Government institute of the Indian state of Bihar

Urdu Academy, Bihar

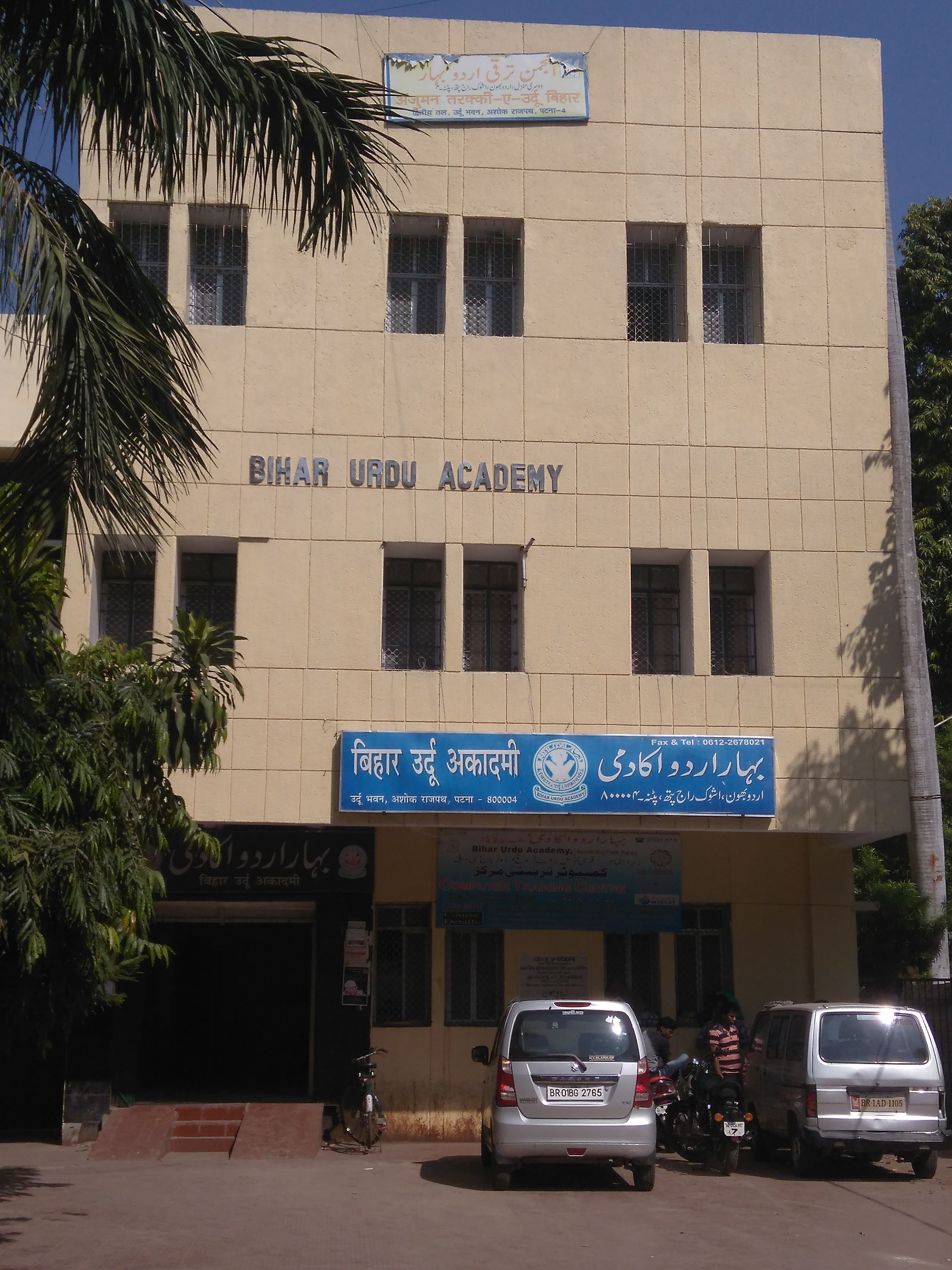
- Formation: 1972
- Type: Literary
- Legal status: Registered society
- Purpose: Literary and cultural
- Headquarters: Patna, Bihar
- Location: Patna, Bihar
- Official language: Urdu
- Key people: Azimullah Ansari
- Main organ: Academy, library, auditorium, publications
- Parent organization: Urdu Academy, Bihar
- Affiliations: Minority Welfare Department Bihar, Maulana Mazharul Haque Arabic and Persian University and National Council for Promotion of Urdu Language
- Website: www.biharurduacademy.in
- Remarks: To serve the Urdu language in Bihar.

Bihar Urdu Academy, also known as the Urdu Academy, Bihar, is a governmental organisation and institute based in Patna, the capital city of the Indian state of Bihar. It was established in 1972, and aims to promote the use of Urdu language within the state. As well as they provide diploma and various other courses degrees.

== Publications ==
- Zaban-o-Adab is a monthly magazine published by the academy in the Urdu language.

== Officers ==
- Chairman - Nitish Kumar, Chief Minister of Bihar
- Academy President - Khurshid Ahmed, MLA from West Champaran
- Secretary - Azimullah Ansari
