= SS Java =

SS Java is the name of the following ships:

- SS Java (1865), went missing in 1895
- SS Java (1872), foundered in Lake Michigan in 1878

== See also ==
- Java (disambiguation)
- Java (1811 ship)
- HMS Java
- USS Java
- SS Java Arrow
