= Java (disambiguation) =

Java is an island of Indonesia.

Java may also refer to:

== Computing ==
- Java (programming language), an object-oriented high-level programming language
- Java (software platform), software and specifications developed by Sun, acquired by Oracle
- Java virtual machine (JVM), an abstract computing machine enabling a computer to run a Java program

== Food and drink ==
- Java (drink), American slang term for coffee
- Java chicken, a breed of chicken originating in the United States
- Java coffee, a variety of coffee grown on the island of Java
- Orthosiphon aristatus, or Java tea, a plant in the Lamiaceae family

== Geography ==
=== United States ===
- Java, Alabama
- Java, Montana
- Java, New York
- Java, Ohio
- Java, South Dakota
- Java, Virginia

=== Other places ===
- Java, Mull, a hamlet on the Isle of Mull, Argyll and Bute, Scotland
- Java-eiland, a neighborhood in Amsterdam
- Dzau District or Java District, a district in South Ossetia
  - Java, South Ossetia or Dzau, a town in South Ossetia
- Java Municipality, claimed municipality of Georgia, including the Dzau District and the town
- Java, São Tomé and Príncipe
- Jave la Grande or Java Maior, a phantom island south of Java

== Entertainment ==
- Java (board game)
- Java (comics), a villain appearing in the DC Comics series Metamorpho
- Java the Caveman, a character in the French-Canadian animated series Martin Mystery

== Music and dance ==
- Java (band), a French band
- Java (dance), a Parisian Bal-musette dance
- "Java" (instrumental), a 1958 song by Allen Toussaint, popularized by Al Hirt
- "Java", a 1956 song by Lucienne Delyle
- "Java", a 1972 song by Augustus Pablo

== Transportation ==
- Avian Java, a British hang glider
- HMS Java, three ships of the British Royal Navy
- Java (1811 ship), a British merchant and migrant ship, then coal hulk until 1939
- USS Java (1815), a 44-gun frigate in the United States Navy
- SS Java (1865), a British and French ocean liner
- Java-class cruiser, a class of Dutch World War II light cruisers
- Java-class frigate (1813), a class of American frigates built during the War of 1812
- Java-class frigate (1863), a class of American frigates built during the Civil War
- Bentley Java, a 1994 concept car
- Chrysler Java, a 1999 concept car

== Other uses ==
- JAVA, the stock ticker symbol for Sun Microsystems from 2007 to 2010
- Javanese script (ISO 15924 code: Java)
- Java (cigarette), a brand of Russian cigarettes
- Java (wasp), a genus of spider wasps

== See also ==
- Java Man, one of the first specimens of Homo erectus to be discovered
- JavaScript, an interpreted programming language
- Javan (disambiguation)
- Javanese (disambiguation)
- Jawa (disambiguation)
- Yava (disambiguation)
- Jaffa (disambiguation)
