= Wazir Khanam =

Courtesan poet of Delhi (1811–1879)

Wazir Khanum
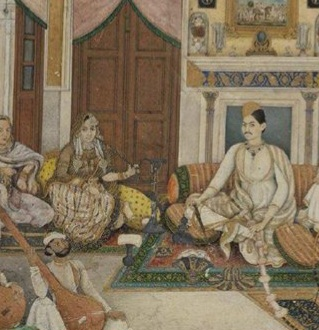
- Wazir Khanum seated alongside Mirza Fakhru.
- Born: 1811; Chawri Bazar Delhi, India
- Died: 1879 (aged 67–68); Rampur, Uttar Pradesh, India
- Occupations: tawaif, poet
- Writing career
- Pen name: Zuhra
- Period: Mughal Empire, Rampur State

Wazir Khanum (1811–1879) was an Indian tawaif and Urdu poet based in Delhi. She lived during the late Mughal Empire when Delhi was fully established as a prominent hub of the arts. Wazir Khanum eventually became begum when she briefly married crown prince Mirza Fakhru.

== Life ==
Wazir Khanum was born on 1811 in Delhi as the youngest of three daughters. Her mother was Asghari Begum, the daughter of a famed tawaif of Delhi's Chawri Bazar district named Akbari Bai, and her father was Muhammad Yusuf, a jeweller and ornament craftsman. Yusuf was of Kashmiri descent and migrated to Delhi at a young age in hopes of better opportunities in the capital of the Mughal Empire. He was then taken in by Akbari Bai, who would later marry her daughter to him. As a result, Wazir grew up cultured and surrounded by art and poetry, access of which was denied to purdah bound girls and women at the time. The young Wazir and her sister Umdah were immersed in the vibrant world of Akbari Bai's kotha; attending musical and poetic soirees and familiarizing themselves with the nobility who would visit. Akbari Bai arranged for them to be mentored by eminent scholars of Delhi, who taught them poetry and music as part of their training as tawaifs.

Wazir's eldest sister Umdah met and became the concubine of Nawab Yusuf Ali Khan of the Rampur royal family, while Wazir remained in the kotha until her meeting with Captain Edward Marston Blake, who she had two children with. After his death, Wazir would then return to Delhi in around 1830, which was when she met Nawab Shamsuddin of the Ferozepur Jhirka state and became his mistress. She was given her own palatial residence in the Khanam Bazar and received a generous allowance. It was around this time that she gave birth to Nawab Mirza Khan, better known as Dagh Dehlvi, who would go on to become an accomplished poet. She sent her four-year-old son to be raised by her sister Umdah in Rampur, and would not reunite with him until she was able to move there after Umdah managed to secure an alliance for her with Agha Turab, a powerful nobleman of Rampur.

In 1842, Agha Turab was killed at the hands of thugs. Wazir, aggrieved by the death of her lover, returned to Delhi with her two sons to live in her old residence.

=== As Begum ===
Wazir Khanum entered the Red Fort as begum when she married Mirza Fakhru, the crown prince of the Mughal Dynasty on July 10, 1856. He was besotted with her and she was elevated to the position Shaukat Mahal (lit.splendour of the palace) and enjoyed a high position in the imperial harem. Her teenage son Dagh received a privileged education in the palace and was under the tutelage of the poet Zauq.

However, the stability of palace life for Wazir soon came to an end. On July 10, 1856, Mirza Fakhru had died, thus being eliminated as rival to other contenders to the throne. Wazir was evicted from the palace by the chief queen, the mother of Jawan Bakht, who was happy that her son had become crown prince and heir. The 43 year old Wazir moved back to her old residence in the Khanam Bazar with her two sons. She would eventually move to Rampur when Dagh received an appointment from the Nawab Yusuf Ali Khan, possibly living there until her death in 1879.

== Accomplishments ==
As a tawaif, Wazir was highly skilled in poetry and was an accomplished poet. Unfortunately, only bits and pieces of her poetry remain to this day. The following is a surviving fragment of her work:

Better to listen to the counseller quietly

I shall not listen to an ignorant person

سن لیں نصیح کے چپ رہیں بہتر

ہم نہ دینگے جواب جاہل کو

== In literature ==
She is the protagonist of the 2006 Urdu novel Kai Chand the Sar-e-Aasman by Shamsur Rahman Faruqi.
