= Jawani =

Jawani may refer to:

- Jawani, Ghana, a community in Ghana
- Jawani (film), a 1942 Indian film

== See also ==
- Jawan (disambiguation)
- Jawaani, a 1984 Indian Hindi-language film
- Jawani Diwani, a 1972 Indian musical romance film by Narendra Bedi
- Jawani Diwani: A Youthful Joyride, 2006 Indian film by Maneesh Sharma
- Jawaani Jaaneman, 2020 Indian family-comedy film by Nitin Kakkar
