= Jaban =

Jaban may refer to:

- Peter John Jaban, Malaysian DJ
- Jaban, Dodangeh, a village in East Azerbaijan Province, Iran
- Jaban, Tehran, a village in Iran
- Jaban (film), a 1972 Indian Bengali-language film by Palash Banerjee

== See also ==
- Jawan (disambiguation)
- Javan (disambiguation)
