= Cat's whiskers =

A cat's whiskers are specialized sensory hairs that help them sense their environment.

Cat's whiskers may also refer to:

- Cat's-whisker detector, an electric component
- Orthosiphon aristatus, a plant commonly known as cat's whiskers
