= Bahadur Shah Zafar grave dispute =

Coordinates: 16°47′23.3″N 96°09′00″E

The location of the grave of Bahadur Shah Zafar, the last Mughal emperor at Yangon, Myanmar, is in dispute. He was buried in the back of his enclosure, but by 1903, no one knew where. After some protests, the British were forced to construct a stone slab to mark the site of his grave. The location of his burial was once again found in 1991, when excavators found the skeleton of the last Mughal emperor there. A mausoleum was constructed and inaugurated in 1994.

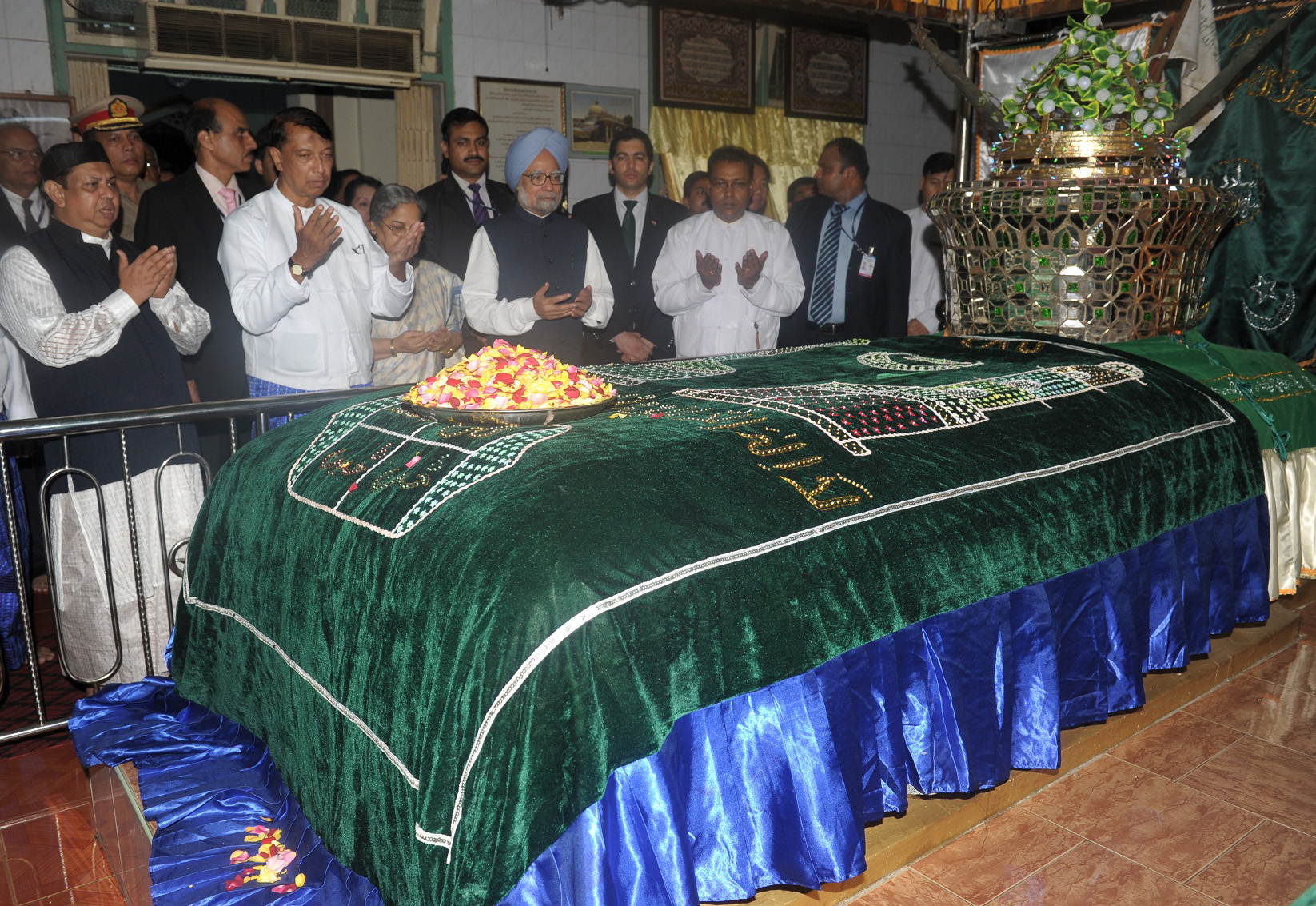
Former Prime Minister of India Manmohan Singh prays at the Mazar of Bahadur Shah Zafar, in Yangon, Myanmar.

== Death ==
When Zafar reached the age of 87 in 1862, he was "weak and feeble." In late October 1862, his health condition deteriorated suddenly. The British Commissioner, Captain H. Nelson Davies, wrote that his future was "very uncertain." He was "spoon-fed on broth," but even found that difficult by the beginning of November. On November 6, Davies recorded that Zafar "is evidently sinking from pure desuetude and paralysis in the region of his throat. "To prepare for the king's death", Davies ordered a collection of lime and bricks to be built, and a spot was selected at the "back of Zafar's enclosure" for his burial. Zafar eventually died on November 7, 1862, at 5 a.m. He was buried at 4 p.m. on the same day "at the rear of the Main Guard in a brick grave covered over with turf level with the ground," according to Davies. The ceremony was attended by his two children and their servant but not Zafar's wife, Zinat Mahal.

Davies recorded that "[a] bamboo fence surrounds the grave for some considerable distance, and by the time the fence is worn out, the grass will again have properly covered the spot [...] [N]o vestige will remain to distinguish where the last of the Great Moghuls rests." He also said that the death did not have any effect on the people of Rangoon, except for some Muslims who paid their tribute to the "final triumph of Islam."

== Burying Zinat Mahal and Jawan Bakht ==
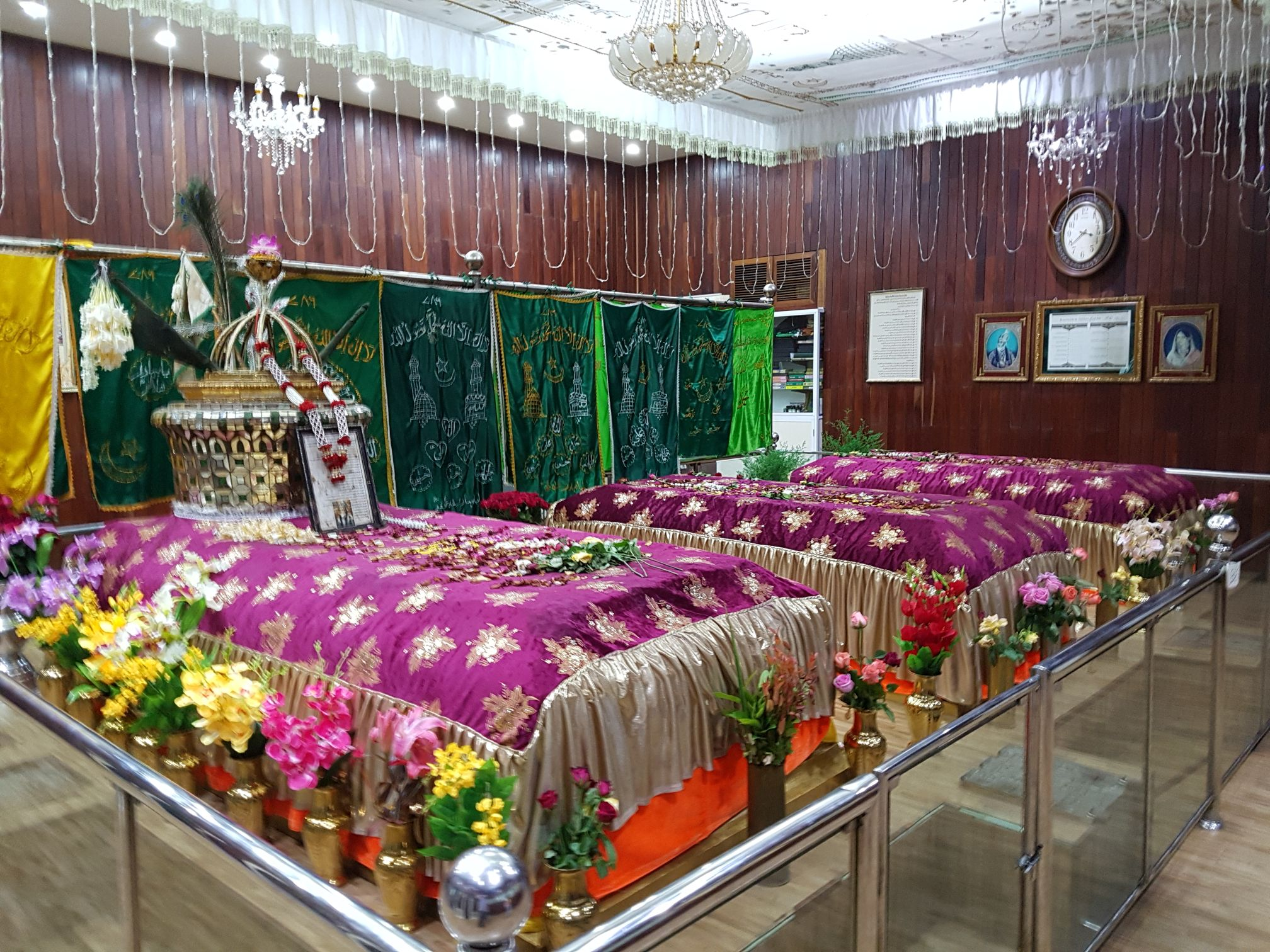
The tombs of Bahadur Shah Zafar's wives and sons, Zinat Mahal and Jawan Bakht

Zafar's wife, Zinat Mahal, died in 1882, approximately 20 years after his death. When she died, the location of Zafar's grave had already been forgotten and "could not be located," so she was buried in a roughly similar position near a tree where his grave was assumed to be. Zafar's son, Mirza Jawan Bakht, died two years later and was also buried at the same site.

== 1903 visitors and protests ==
In 1903, a group of visitors came from India to pay tribute to Zafar at his burial place. But at that time "even the exact location of Zinat Mahal's grave had been forgotten, though some local guides pointed out the sight of the withered lotus tree." In 1905, the Muslims of Rangoon protested and demanded that there should be some measure to demarcate Zafar's grave because "...as a man or as a king, Bahadur Shah was not to be admired, but he should be remembered." They wanted the government to buy a "strip of land enclosing the grave in question, of sufficient area to permit a monument worthy of Bahadur Shah erected over it."

This notion was forwarded by the British to Calcutta and the reply was that it was "inappropriate for the Government" to construct "anything" over the remains of Zafar as a tomb "which might become a place of pilgrimage." This was followed by demonstrations and a "long series of newspaper articles" by which the British agreed in 1907 to erect a single stone slab on which was engraved, "Bahadur Shah, ex-King of Delhi died at Rangoon on November 7th, 1862, and was buried near this spot." The Rangoon Times of 26 August 1907 reported that a meeting would be held at the Victoria Hall to "record a sense of satisfaction among the Mohammedan community for the erection of the present memorial." Later that year, a memorial stone devoted to Zinat Mahal was added. Zafar's granddaughter, Raunaq Zamani, was also buried nearby. Though the spot was lost, people knew that Zafar was buried somewhat south of Shwedagon Pagoda.

== Dargah ==
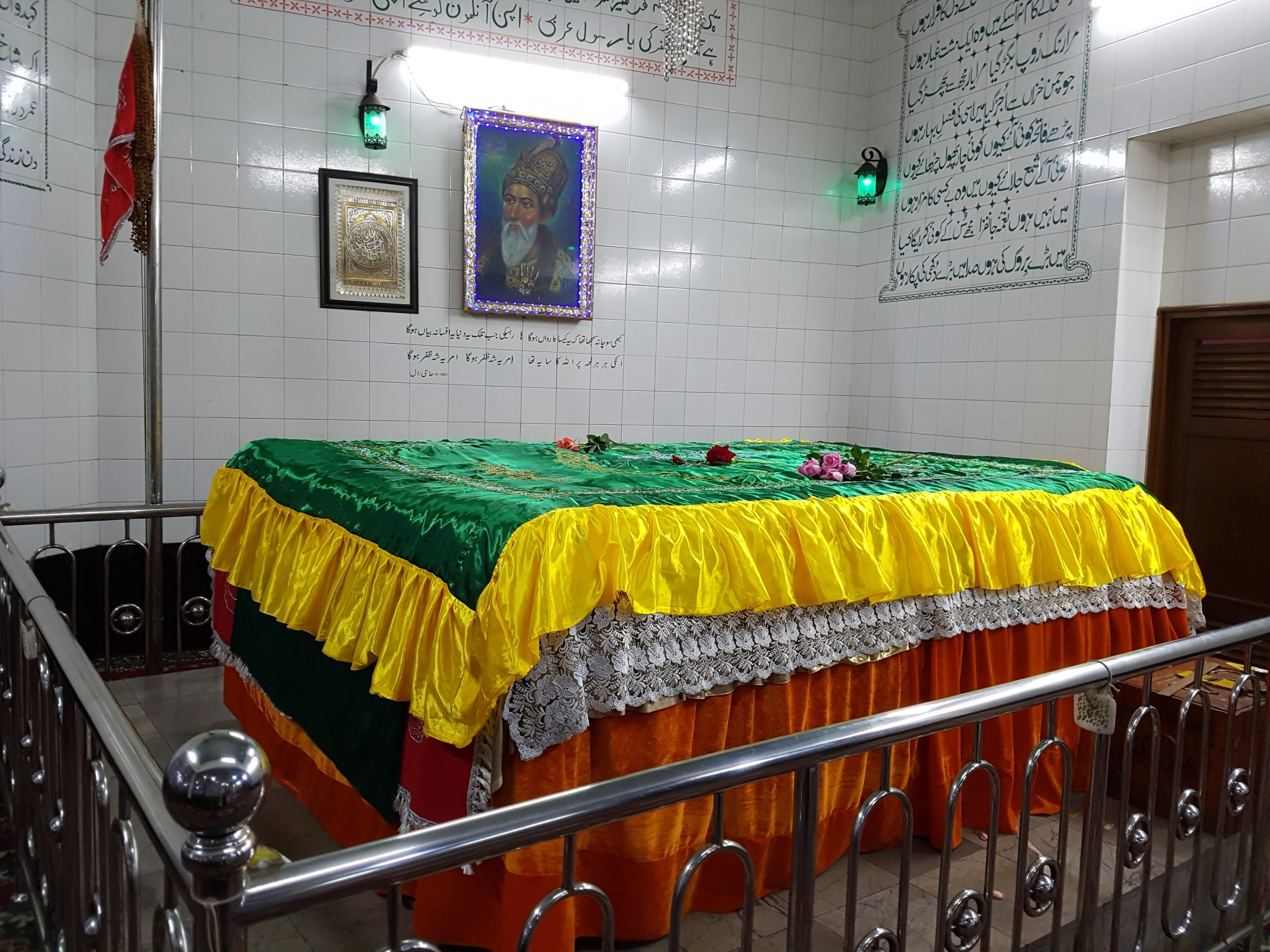
The Tomb of the last Mughal Emperor, Bahadur Shah Zafar

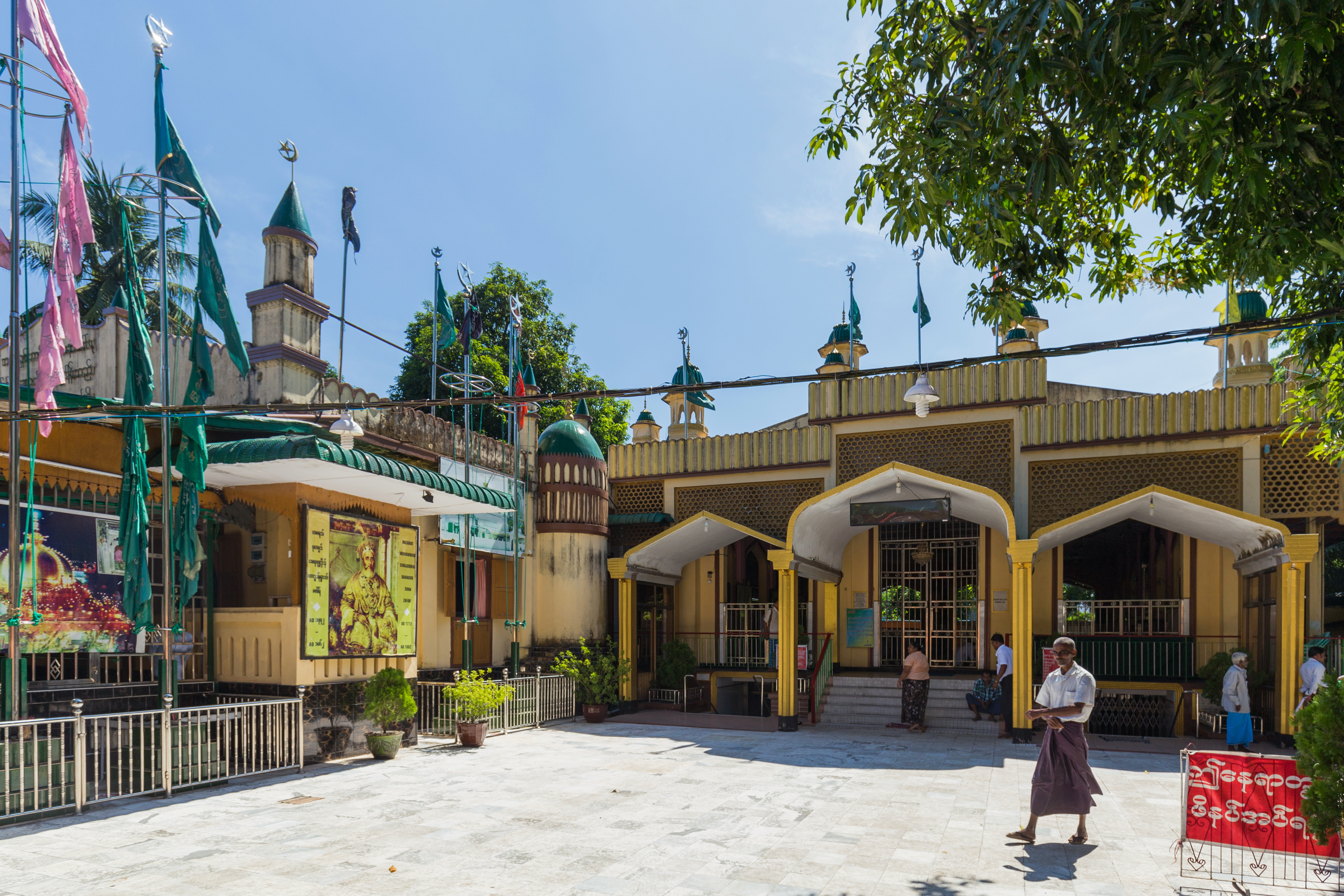
Bahadur Shah Zafar Dargah Memorial, Yangon

The railing was made into a makeshift stone by 1925, which was covered with corrugated iron. According to the Myanmar Times, the British wanted the tomb to be "lost and forgotten and hoped to leave no trace that could allow the body to be identified."

In February 1991, workers who were digging for a drain discovered a "brick-lined tomb." On top of it was an inscription and soon the body's identity was found. After a few years, a dargah or Islamic shrine was built, which was inaugurated on 15 December 1994. Zafar is respected as an "Emperor-Saint," and hence this shrine has become an important place for pilgrimage by Muslims.

Inside the two-story mausoleum are separate prayer rooms for men and women. The walls are adorned with engraved marble plaques. There are 9 steps to the crypt where people play drums and read the Quran. The dargah is often visited by politicians and dignitaries from South Asia, including former Indian Prime Minister Manmohan Singh.
