= List of ships named SS Zeeland =

At least two ships have been named SS Zeeland

- SS Zeeland, an 11,905 GRT ship, scrapped in 1930.
- SS Java, a 2,866 GRT ship built for Cunard Line as Java in 1865, renamed Zeeland for Red Star Line in 1878
