= Jawan =

Jawan may refer to:

- Jawaan, a 2017 Indian action thriller film
- Jawan (film), a 2023 Indian action-thriller film
  - Jawan (soundtrack), soundtrack album of the film of the same name
- Jawan Jamison (born 1991), American football player
- Jawan Sikandarpur, a village block and nagar panchayat in Uttar Pradesh, India
- Jawan Vajidpur, a village in Uttar Pradesh, India

== See also ==
- Jawan Bakht (disambiguation), list of people with the name
- Jawann Oldham (1957–2026), American basketball player
- Jawani (disambiguation)
- Javan (disambiguation)
- Jaban (disambiguation)
- Jawa (disambiguation)
