= Javan (disambiguation) =

Javan was a descendant of Noah, according to the Hebrew Bible.

Javan may also refer to:

- Something of, from, or related to the Indonesian island of Java

== Characters ==
- Javan (ThunderCats), a character in the animated series ThunderCats

== People with the given name ==
- Javan Sebastian (born 1994), Welsh rugby union player
- Javan Vidal (born 1989), English footballer

== People with the surname ==
- Ali Javan (1926–2016), Iranian-American physicist
- Rambod Javan (born 1971), Iranian actor

== Organizations ==
- Javan (newspaper), an Iranian newspaper

== See also ==
- Java (disambiguation)
- Javanese (disambiguation)
- Javon (disambiguation)
- Jawan (disambiguation)
- Yawan (disambiguation)
- Jaban (disambiguation)
