= History of Java =

History of Java may refer to:

- History of the island of Java
- The History of Java, an 1817 book by Stamford Raffles, founder of modern Singapore
- Java version history, version history of the Java programming language
- History of the Java platform

== See also ==
- History of JavaScript
- ECMAScript (JavaScript) version history
- Java (disambiguation)
