= Jamshed Bakht =

Mughal Prince

- Born: 1860; Yangoon, Myanmar, British Burma
- Died: 1921 (aged 60–61); Yangoon, Myanmar, British Burma
- Spouse: Sultana Nadir Begum
- Issue: Mirza Sikandar; Bedar Bakht
- Father: Mirza Jawan Bakht
- Mother: Nawab Shah S Begum

Jamshed Bakht was a Mughal descendant through his father, Mirza Jawan Bakht, son of Bahadur Shah II the last Mughal emperor. His mother was his father's maternal cousin Nawab Shah S Begum. In 1859, British authorities removed all bans and restrictions on the Mughal royalty and Bakht received a princely pension of 450 Rupees per month. He had married twice, secondly to Sultana Nadir Begum which allegedly produced Bakht's only son Bedaar Bakht, though he is said to have had at least one son out of wedlock through mistresses. He died in 1921 after which the princely pension was suspended till after Indian Independence.

Jamshed Bakht went to get an English education at Diocesan School and Rangoon College and turned out to be a man of cheerful character. He was associated with the initiative to build a mausoleum for his grandfather, and was seen as someone who spoke English gracefully. He lived a life of extreme poverty, and died at the age of sixty in 1921, about 22 years after his mother. Had she been fortunate enough to be the next Mughal Empress after Zinat Mahal, Shah Zamani Begum's name would have revived history but the wind suddenly changed ("Gai Yak Ba Yak Ju Hua Balat"). As for her ancestral home, it may be located at the Ghat Gate of Jaipur where some well-known Muslim families still live, despite the noise pollution caused by the iron makers of Loharon Ka Khora.

He had two sons, Mirza Sikandar from a mistress and Bedar Bakht, born of Begum Nadir Jehan. Bedaar Bakht, who died in 1980, was the last officially recognized direct male descendant of the Bahadur Shah Zafar who received pension from the British and then the central government, from the Nizam and the Hazrat Nizamuddin Trust.
