= Jawa =

Jawa may refer to:

== Places ==
=== Southeast Asia ===
- Java (Javanese: Jawa), the most populous and fifth-largest island in Indonesia and the site of its capital, Jakarta
  - East Java, also called Jawa Timur, a province on the Indonesian island of Java
  - Central Java, also called Jawa Tengah, a province on the Indonesian island of Java
  - West Java, also called Jawa Barat, a province on the Indonesian island of Java
  - Karimunjava, an archipelago of 69 islands in the Java Sea, Indonesia, approximately 80 kilometres northwest of Jepara
- Chek Jawa, a cape and the name of its 100-hectare wetlands located on the south-eastern tip of Pulau Ubin off coast of Singapore
- Padang Jawa, a small town in Selangor, Malaysia
- Parit Jawa, a main town in Muar district, Johor, Malaysia

=== Middle East ===
- Jawa, Jordan, archaeological site in Jordan
- Tall Jawa, Iron Age village in central Jordan
- Zaduqabad, Iran, a village in Markazi Province, Iran, also known as Jāwa

== Entertainment ==
- Jawa (Star Wars), a fictional alien species from Star Wars
- Langgam jawa, a regional form of Indonesian kroncong music most often associated with the city of Surakarta
- Jawa: Mammoth and the Stone's Secret, a 2008 game for the Nintendo Wii home video game console

== Other uses ==
- The Javanese language, sometimes known as Jawa in romanized Javanese
- Jawa Moto, also known as JAWA Motokov, a manufacturer of motorcycles based in the Czech Republic
- Jawa Pos, an Indonesian daily newspaper published in Surabaya, East Java
- The Jawa Report, a blog and forum for civilians concerned about terrorism by Islamists
- Joint Action Water Agency, a form of organization for public water supply utilities

== See also ==
- Java (disambiguation)
- Jawan (disambiguation)
