= Orthosiphon fruticosus =

Conservation status
- Least Concern (SANBI Red List)

Scientific classification
- Kingdom: Plantae
- Clade: Embryophytes
- Clade: Tracheophytes
- Clade: Spermatophytes
- Clade: Angiosperms
- Clade: Eudicots
- Clade: Asterids
- Order: Lamiales
- Family: Lamiaceae
- Genus: Orthosiphon
- Species: O. fruticosus

Binomial name
- Orthosiphon fruticosus Codd

Species of flowering plant

Orthosiphon fruticosus, commonly called the bushveld piccadill, is a species of flowering plant in the family Lamiaceae. It is endemic to South Africa.

== Description ==
This species is a twiggy shrub growing to 0.5–1.2 m (1 ft 8 in – 3 ft 11 in) tall. The young stems are softly hairy, becoming smoother with age. The older bark often peels away in thin strips.

The leaves are small, leathery and narrow, 8–18 mm (0.31–0.71 in) × 2.5–6 mm (0.098–0.236 in), borne on short stalks and often clustered on short side shoots. They are greyish in appearance, with a net-like texture and tiny glands on the underside, pointed at the tip and narrowing at the base.

The flowering stems are simple and slender, with small clusters of two to four flowers spaced along them. The calyx is 7–9 mm (0.28–0.35 in) long in fruit. The corolla is purple and gland-dotted, with a straight tubular base and two lips, the upper held upright and the lower slightly cupped. The stamens project slightly beyond the flower opening, and the stigma is shallowly divided.

== Distribution and habitat ==
Orthosiphon fruticosus grows on stony slopes in dry bushveld from Loskop Dam in the South African province of Mpumalanga to the Steelpoort Valley in Limpopo.

== See also ==
- List of Lamiaceae of South Africa
