= Jawan Bakht =

Jawan Bakht may refer to:

- Mirza Jawan Bakht (born 1749), Mughal prince
- Mirza Jawan Bakht (born 1841), Mughal prince
- Hashim Jawan Bakht (born 1979), Pakistani politician who is the current Provincial Minister of Punjab for finance
