= Orthosiphon ferrugineus =

Conservation status
- Vulnerable (IUCN 3.1)

Scientific classification
- Kingdom: Plantae
- Clade: Tracheophytes
- Clade: Angiosperms
- Clade: Eudicots
- Clade: Asterids
- Order: Lamiales
- Family: Lamiaceae
- Genus: Orthosiphon
- Species: O. ferrugineus

Binomial name
- Orthosiphon ferrugineus Balf.f.

Species of plant

Orthosiphon ferrugineus, the Socotran piccadill, is a species of flowering plant in the family Lamiaceae. It is found only on Socotra Island, part of the nation of Yemen. Its natural habitat is subtropical or tropical dry shrubland. It belongs under the class of Magnoliopsida.
