= Orthosiphon schimperi =

Scientific classification
- Kingdom: Plantae
- Clade: Tracheophytes
- Clade: Angiosperms
- Clade: Eudicots
- Clade: Asterids
- Order: Lamiales
- Family: Lamiaceae
- Genus: Orthosiphon
- Species: O. schimperi

Binomial name
- Orthosiphon schimperi Benth.

Synonyms
- Ocimum buchananii Baker; Ocimum coloratum Hochst.; Orthosiphon buchananii (Baker) M.R.Ashby; Orthosiphon dissimilis N.E.Br.; Orthosiphon shirensis Baker

Species of flowering plant

Orthosiphon schimperi, commonly called the purple piccadill, is a sub-Saharan species of flowering plant in the family Lamiaceae. It closely resembles the Asia-bound species Orthosiphon rubicundus, and some sources misapply the latter name in parts of Africa.

== Description ==
This is a perennial herb with a thick woody rootstock extending both downward and laterally, growing to about 0.2–1 m (0.66–3.28 ft) tall, not or only weakly aromatic. Stems are numerous, erect and square in cross-section, usually unbranched below the flowering shoots, and variably hairy, especially along the angles.

Leaves are subsessile to shortly stalked above and more distinctly stalked below, with ovate to elliptic blades 3–11 cm (1.2–4.3 in) long and 1.5–5 cm (0.59–1.97 in) wide (occasionally broader), coarsely toothed, and variably hairy, particularly along the veins beneath.

The inflorescence is initially dense, with flower clusters touching, later becoming more spaced in fruit; small bracts are 2.5–7 mm (0.098–0.276 in) long. The calyx is typically flushed reddish-brown to purple, 4.5–7 mm (0.18–0.28 in) long at flowering and elongating to 7–10 mm (0.28–0.39 in) (rarely 13 mm (0.51 in)) in fruit. The corolla is usually pale pink, occasionally white or mauve, 9–11 mm (0.35–0.43 in) long, with a straight tube and a hooded lower lip that encloses the stamens.

The nutlets are brown, broadly egg-shaped, about 1.5 mm (0.059 in) long, and produce a small amount of mucilage when wet.

=== Identification ===
The African species that Orthosiphon schimperi most closely resembles is Orthosiphon thymiflorus. In eastern Africa, the former species can be distinguished by, among other things, its larger fruiting calyx, which is a purple– red colour throughout. In the latter species, the upper lip of the calyx is purple, while the lower lip is green. (This distinction may not hold in other regions.)

== Distribution and habitat ==
Orthosiphon schimperi is widespread in tropical Africa, having been recorded in Angola, Benin, Burkina Faso, Burundi, Cameroon, the Democratic Republic of the Congo, Eritrea, Ethiopia, Ghana, Guinea, the Ivory Coast, Kenya, Malawi, Mali, Mozambique, Nigeria, Rwanda, Somalia, South Sudan, Tanzania, Togo, Uganda, Zambia, Zimbabwe, and the South African province of Limpopo. It grows in open, grassy woodland, especially in more moist places.

== Etymology ==
Orthosiphon schimperi is named for Wilhelm Schimper (1804–1878), the German botanist who first collected it on Mount Soloda in Tigray in 1838. Schimper spent over forty years collecting specimens in Ethiopia and is thought to have introduced more African plants to science than anyone before or since. Scores of other taxa bear his name.

== See also ==
- List of Lamiaceae of South Africa
