= Bekhud Dehlvi =

Indian Urdu language poet

- Born: Syed Wahiduddin Ahmed; 21 March 1863; Bharatpur, Rajasthan
- Died: 2 October 1955 (aged 92); Delhi
- Known for: Poetry
- Notable work: Guftar e Bekhud, Shahsavaar e Bekhud

Bekhud Dehlvi (21 March 1863 – 2 October 1955), born Syed Wahid-ud-Din Ahmed, was the son of Syed Shams-ud-Din "Salim", also an Urdu language poet. Bekhud was born at Bharatpur, which is now in Rajasthan. He was brought to Delhi by Altaf Hussain Hali who in 1891 made Bekhud became a disciple of Daagh Dehlvi and soon rose in prominence. His collection of Urdu ghazals – Guftar e Bekhud and Shahsavaar e Bekhud, were published during his lifetime. He died on 2 October 1955 in Delhi at the age of 92 years.
