= Mirza Abu Bakht =

Mughal prince (1835–1857)

Mirza Abu Bakht (1835–1857) was a Mughal prince. Mirza Abu Bakht was the father of Mirza Muhammed Baig and the son of Mirza Fath-ul-Mulk Bahadur who was the last crown prince of the Mughal Kingdom and the eldest son of the last Mughal Emperor Bahadur Shah Zafar. He was the oldest legitimate grandson of the Emperor.

With his uncle, Prince Mirza Mughal and brother, Mirza Bakhtawar Shah, Mirza Abu Bakht was shot and killed by Major William Stephen Raikes Hodson near Khooni Darwaza (Bloody Gate) during the Indian Rebellion of 1857. During the siege of Delhi by British forces, the young Mughal prince had been appointed to command his grandfather's cavalry. According to Indian witnesses and newsletters published in Delhi during the siege, Abu Bakht and his undisciplined troopers had been responsible for perpetrating atrocities against both Hindu and Muslim civilians in and near the city.

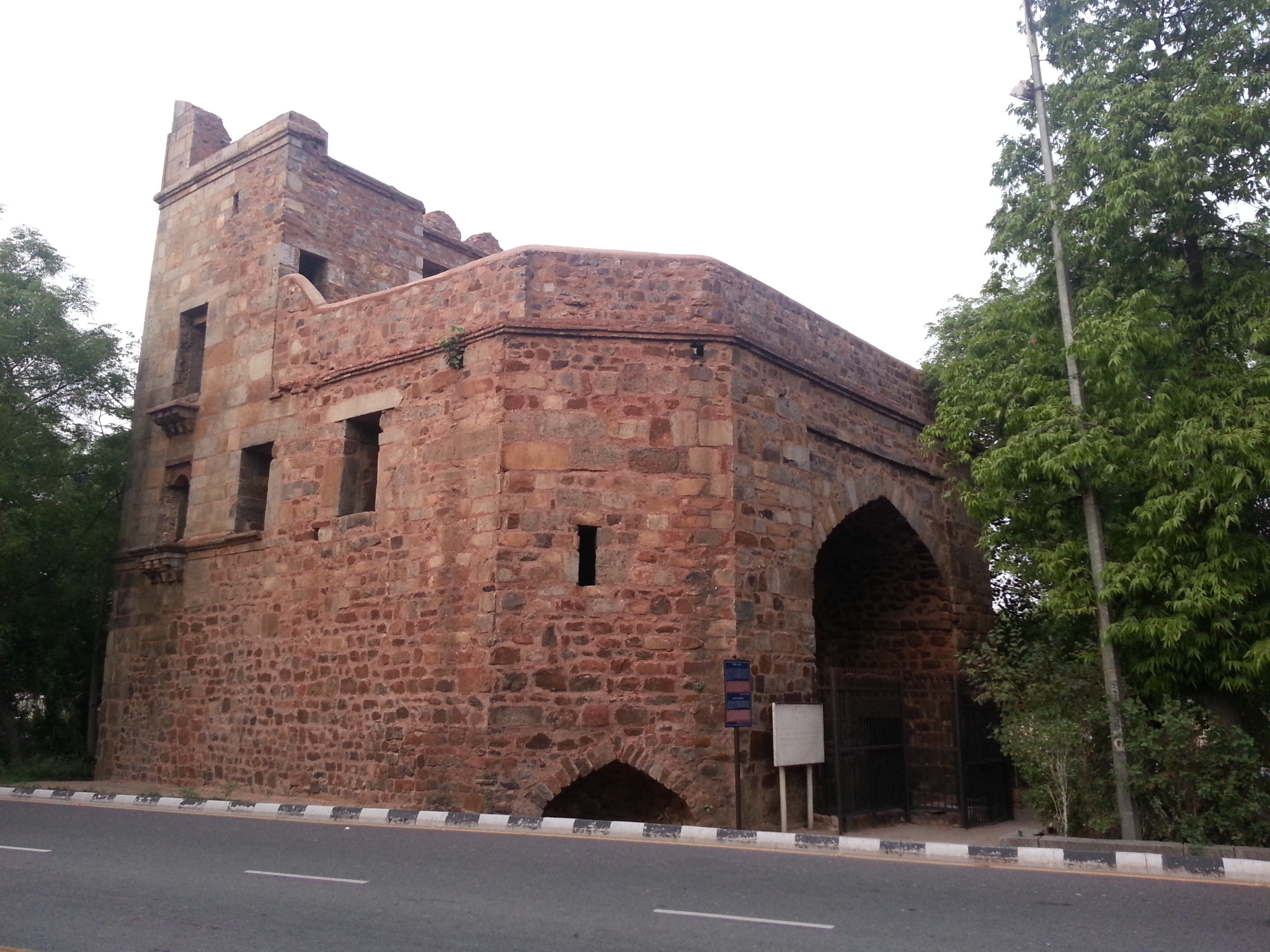
Khooni Darwaza, where Mirza Abu Bakht was killed
