= Yava =

Yava may refer to:

- Yava, Arizona, a populated place situated in Yavapai County
- Yava, Tajikistan, a town in north-western Tajikistan
- "Yava!", a song by Babymetal on the 2016 album Metal Resistance
- Yava Dvipa, former name of Java Island

== See also ==
- Java (disambiguation)
