= Javanese =

Javanese may refer to:

== Of Java ==
- Of or from Java, an Indonesian island in Southeast Asia
- Javanese people, and their culture
- Javanese language
  - Javanese script, traditional letters used to write Javanese language
  - Javanese (Unicode block),
  - Old Javanese, the oldest phase of the Javanese language
- Javanese beliefs
- Javanese calendar
- Javanese cuisine
- Javanese Surinamese, an ethnic group of Javanese descent in Suriname

== Other ==
- Javanese cat, a breed of domestic cat

== See also ==
- Java (disambiguation)
- Javan (disambiguation)
