= Daagh Dehlvi =

Indian poet (1831-1905)

- نواب مرزا خان داغ دہلوی
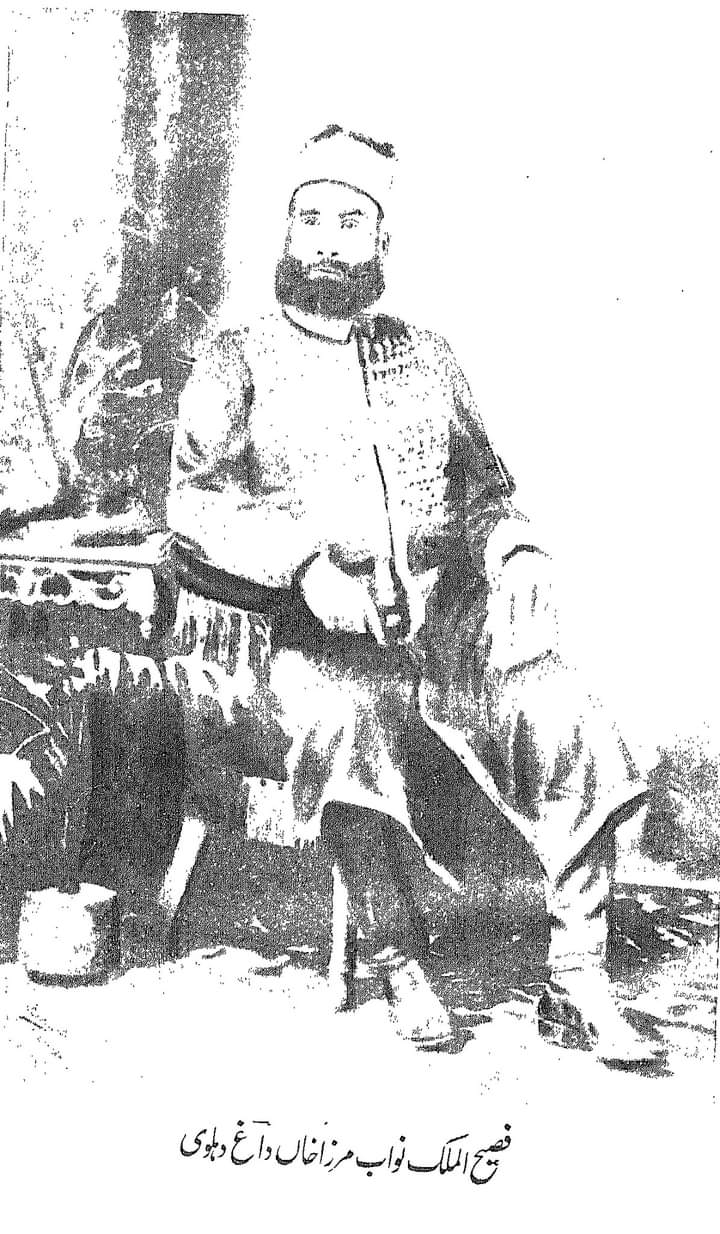
- داغ دہلویؔ
- Born: Nawab Mirza Khan; 25 May 1831; Delhi, Mughal Empire
- Died: 17 March 1905 (aged 73); Hyderabad, Hyderabad Deccan
- Occupation: Poet
- Writing career
- Pen name: Daagh
- Period: 1831 to 1905
- Genres: Ghazal; qasida; mukhammas
- Subjects: Love and human relationships
- Notable works: Gulzar-e-Daagh (1878); Masnavi Fariyad-e-Daagh (1882); Diwan-e-Daagh

Nawab Mirza Khan (Urdu: نواب مرزا خان داغ دہلوی, 25 May 1831 – 17 March 1905), popularly known by his takhallus Dagh Dehlvi was an Indian poet known for his Urdu ghazals. He belonged to the old Delhi school of Urdu poetry.

He wrote romantic and sensuous poems and ghazals in simple and chaste Urdu, minimising usage of Persian words. He laid great emphasis on the Urdu idiom and its usage. He wrote under the takhallus (Urdu word for pen name) Daagh Dehlvi (the meanings of Daagh, an Urdu noun, include stain, grief and taint while Dehlvi means belonging to or from Dehli or Delhi). He belonged to the Delhi school of thought in Urdu poetry.

His honorific Dabeer ud Dawla, Faseeh ul Mulk, Nawab Nizam Jang Bahadur, Sipah Salar, Yar-e-Wafadar, Muqrib-us-Sultan, Bulbul-e-Hindustan, Jahan Ustad, Nazim Yar Jung, were the titles bestowed upon him by the sixth Nizam of Hyderabad Mir Mahbub Ali Khan.

Daagh was considered one of the best romantic poets of his time by some commentators.

== Life ==
=== Early life ===
Dehlvi was born in Kuucha Ustad Dagh, Chandni Chowk in Delhi to Nawab Shamsuddin Ahmed Khan, the ruler of Loharu and Ferozepur Jhirka and Wazir Khanum, daughter of a Delhi jeweller. Dehlvi's father was hanged under charges of conspiracy in the murder of William Fraser. Dehlvi at the age of four and his mother at age thirty four, the most sought after lady, wooed and remarried the Mughal crown prince, Mirza Muhammad Fakhroo, an heir to the last Mughal Bahadur Shah Zafar. Hence, Dehlvi had the privileged education at the Delhi Red Fort, There he received best of education and was later under tutelage of poet laureate, Mohammad Ibrahim Zauq. Later, he also took advice from Ghalib on finer nuances of Urdu literature and poetry. He was also trained in calligraphy and horse riding.

=== Literary life ===
Dehlvi belonged to the Dabistan-e-Dehli (Dehli school of thought) and never allowed western influences on his poetry. He started reciting poetry at the age of ten and his forte was the romantic version, the ghazal. He became popular for his poetry. Unlike the elitist style by the poets of the time, his style was simple and was well received by both, the common man and the elite.

After Mughal prince Fakhroo's death in 1856, Dehlvi along with his mother left Delhi after facing turbulent times in the city, for Rampur State and came under the aegis of Nawab of Rampur, Yusuf Ali Khan Bahadur. Daagh went into government service there and lived well for 24 years.

=== Later life in Hyderabad Deccan ===
Dehlvi stayed in Hyderabad in 1888 for several months. He left Hyderabad after not being invited to the court by the sixth Mahbub Ali Khan, Asaf Jah VI's court, as access to his court was very limited. He then was invited immediately and was appointed as the court poet and mentor, in 1891, to the Sixth Nizam Mahbub Ali Khan, Asaf Jah VI, at the age of 60.

Contrary to the impression one gets from his poetry, he did not drink wine and shunned it.

His couplet on Urdu language was:

Urdu hai jiska naam hamee jante hain Daagh
Hindustan mein dhoom hamari zuban ki hai

Translation:

It is Urdu whose name we know, O Daagh
for our language is being celebrated all over India.

=== Death ===
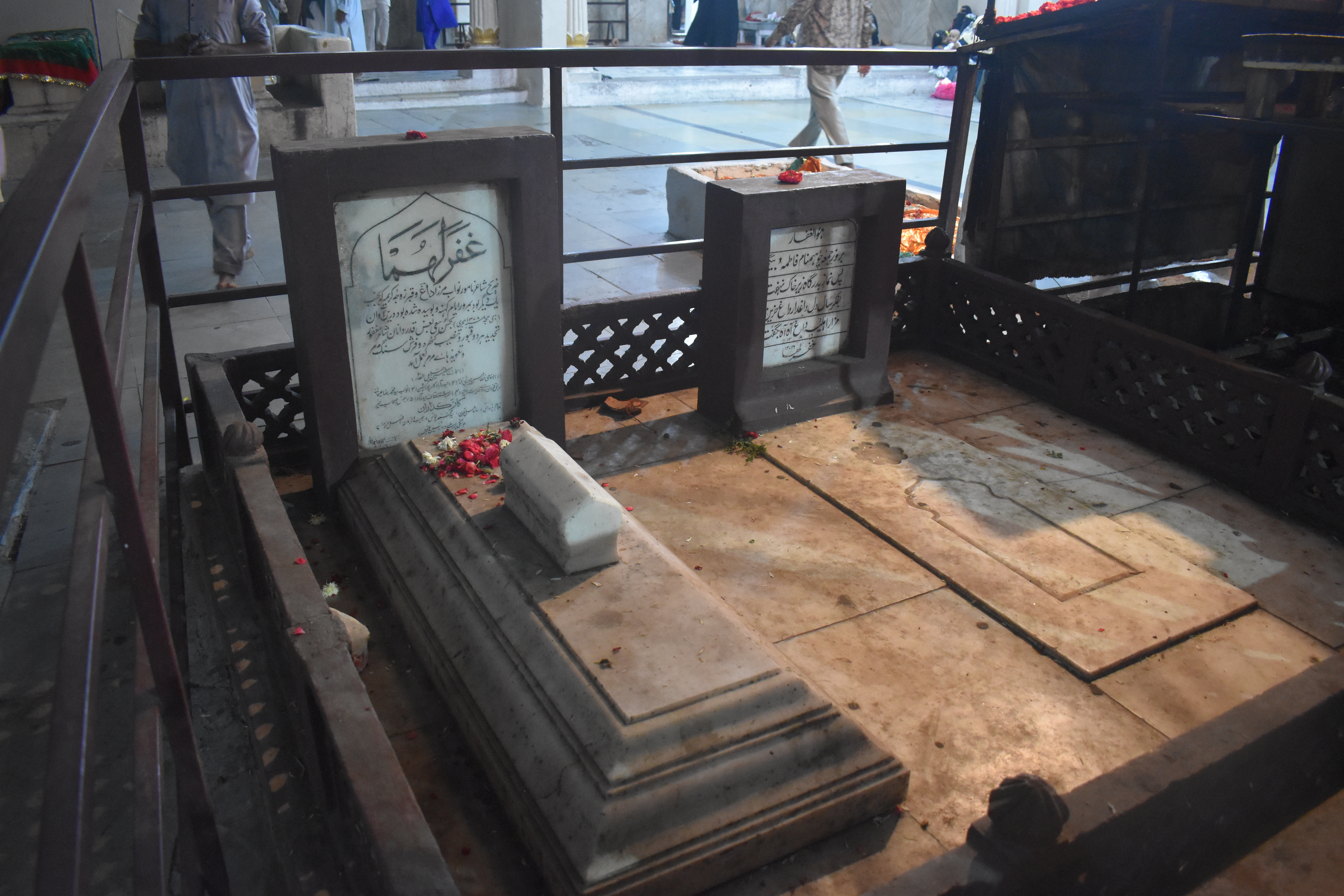
Graves of Dagh Dehlavi and his wife at Dargah Yusufain, Hyderabad

He died in 1905 at the age of 74 in Hyderabad Deccan after a paralytic stroke. He was buried at Dargah Yousufain in Hyderabad.

=== Disciples ===
Dehlvi's students included Allama Iqbal, Hassan Raza Khan (1859-1908), Jigar Moradabadi (1890 – 1960), Seemab Akbarabadi and Ahasan Marharavi, though a widely quoted anecdote relates that when asked to designate his successor as the leading Urdu poet of his age, he replied Bekhudain [the two Bekhuds], referring to Bekhud Badayuni and Bekhud Dehlvi.

=== Popular ghazal songs ===
His selected ghazals are rendered by contemporary ghazal singers, Jagjit Singh, Noor Jahan, Iqbal Bano, Ghulam Ali, Adithya Srinivasan, Malika Pukhraj, Mehdi Hassan, Abida Parveen, Begum Akhtar, Pankaj Udhas and Farida Khanum.

== Bibliography ==
His work consists of four volumes, consisting of 16,000 couplets and a Masnavi. The last two volumes he wrote when he was in Hyderabad.

- Gulzar-e-Daagh (1878)
- Masnavi Fariyad-e-Daagh (1882)
- Aftab-e-Daagh (1885)
- Mahtab-e-Daagh (1893)
- Yaadgar-e-Daagh (posthumous, 1905)
- Diwan e Daagh
- Intikhab-e-Kalam Daagh (edited by Moinuddin Aqeel)
