= Zeenat Mahal =

Padshah Begum of the Mughal Empire from 1840 to 1857

- Empress consort of the Mughal Empire; Begum Sahiba
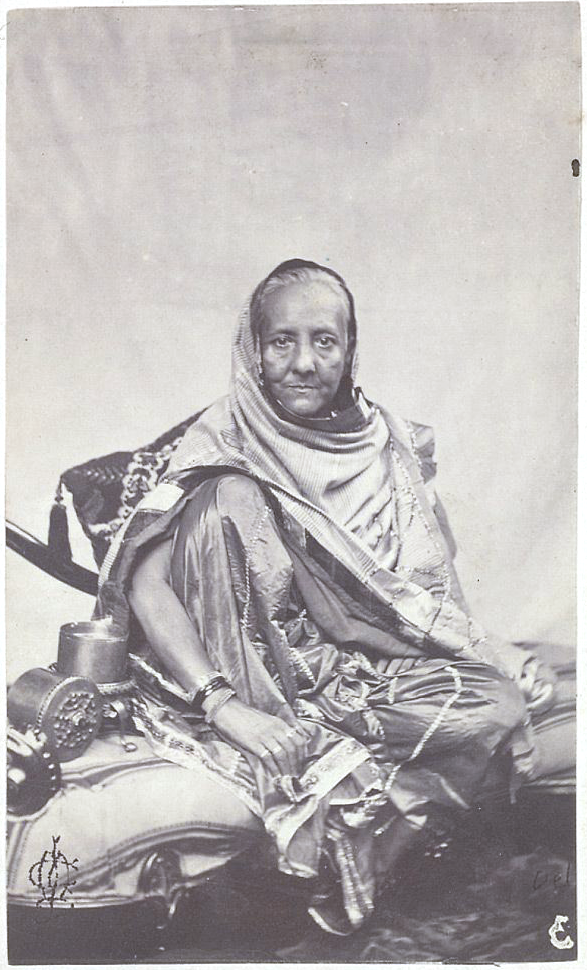
- Zeenat Mahal's supposed only known photograph, possibly the only photograph that exists of any Mughal empress

Padshah Begum
- Tenure: 19 November 1840 – 14 September 1857
- Predecessor: Badshah Begum
- Successor: position abolished
- Born: 1823
- Died: 17 July 1886 (aged 62–63); Rangoon, British Burma
- Burial: Near the Mazar of Bahadur Shah, No. 6 Theatre Road, Yangon, Myanmar
- Spouse: Bahadur Shah II (m. 1840; died 1862)
- Issue: Mirza Jawan Bakht
- House: Timurid

Zeenat Mahal (1823 – 17 July 1886) was a wife of the Mughal emperor Bahadur Shah Zafar and de facto regent of the Mughal Empire on behalf of her husband.

== Biography ==
Zeenat Mahal married Bahadur Shah II at Delhi on 19 November 1840 and had a son with him, Mirza Jawan Bakht.

She greatly influenced the emperor and, after the death of crown prince Mirza Dara Bakht, she began promoting her son Mirza Jawan Bakht as heir to the throne over the Emperor's remaining eldest son Mirza Fath-ul-Mulk Bahadur. But due to the primogeniture policy of the British, this was not accepted. She was suspected of poisoning the British Resident in Delhi, Thomas Metcalfe, in 1853 for meddling too much in palace affairs.

She resided at her own haveli, Zeenat Mahal, in Lal Kuan, old Delhi.

=== 1857 rebellion ===
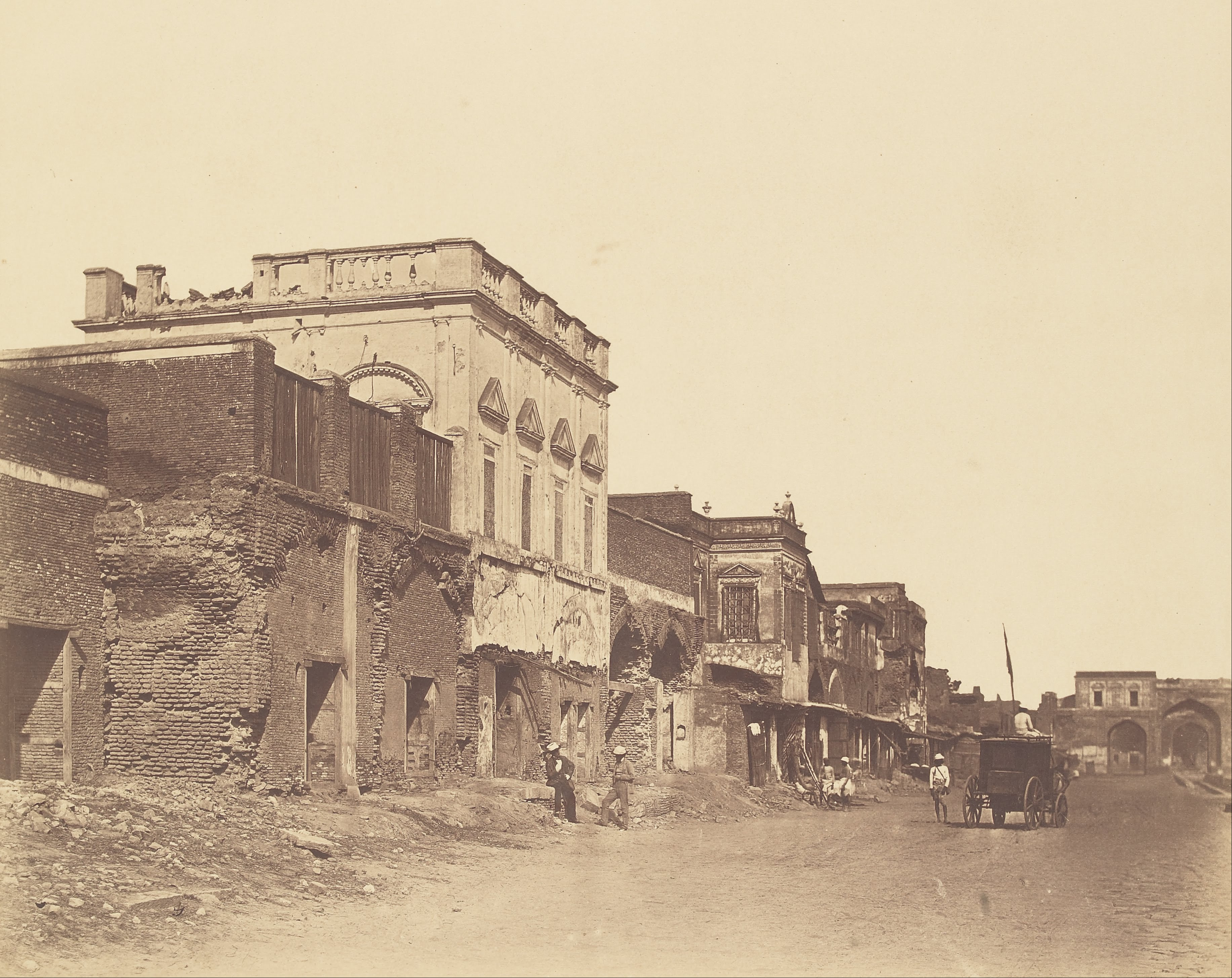
The house in which the King was confined, photograph by Felice Beato

During the Indian rebellion of 1857, she kept her son out of contact with the rebels in an attempt to secure the throne for him. With the British victory, the emperor's two other sons were shot for supporting the rebels; however, her son did not become heir. In 1858, her husband was deposed by the British, bringing the Mughal empire to an end, and she was exiled to Rangoon with her husband. After her husband's death in 1862, the British banned anyone from claiming the title of Emperor in an attempt to dissolve the monarchy.

=== Death ===
She died on 17 July 1886. Another source says that she "died more than 20 years after her husband." She was buried in her husband's tomb in Yangon's Dagon Township near the Shwedagon Pagoda. The site later became known as Bahadur Shah Zafar Dargah.

The grandchild of her and Bahadur Shah II is also buried alongside the couple. After remaining lost for many decades, the tomb was discovered during a restoration exercise in 1991.

== Gallery ==
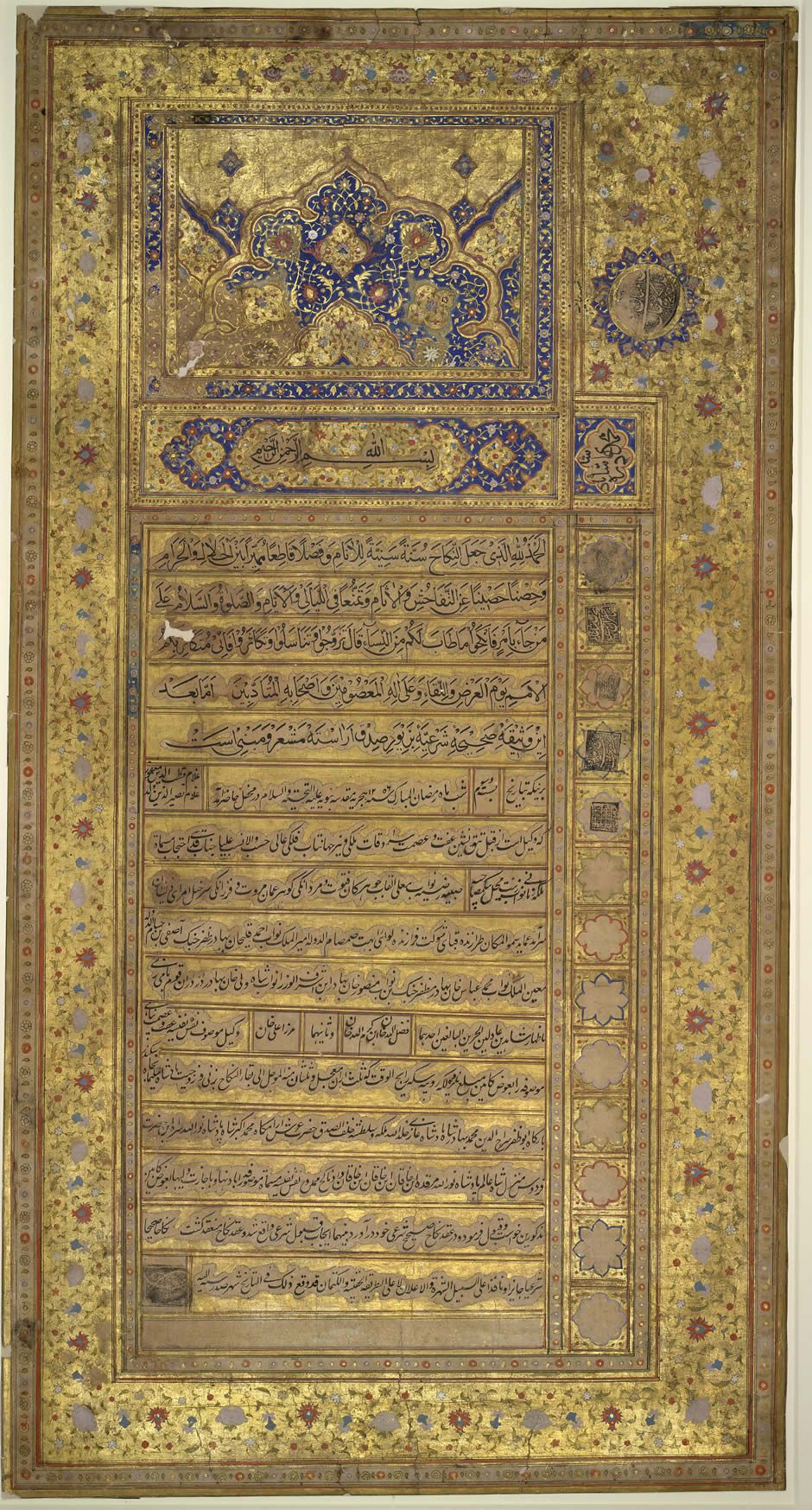
Kabin-name (Marriage Certificate) of Bahadur Shah and Zeenat Mahal

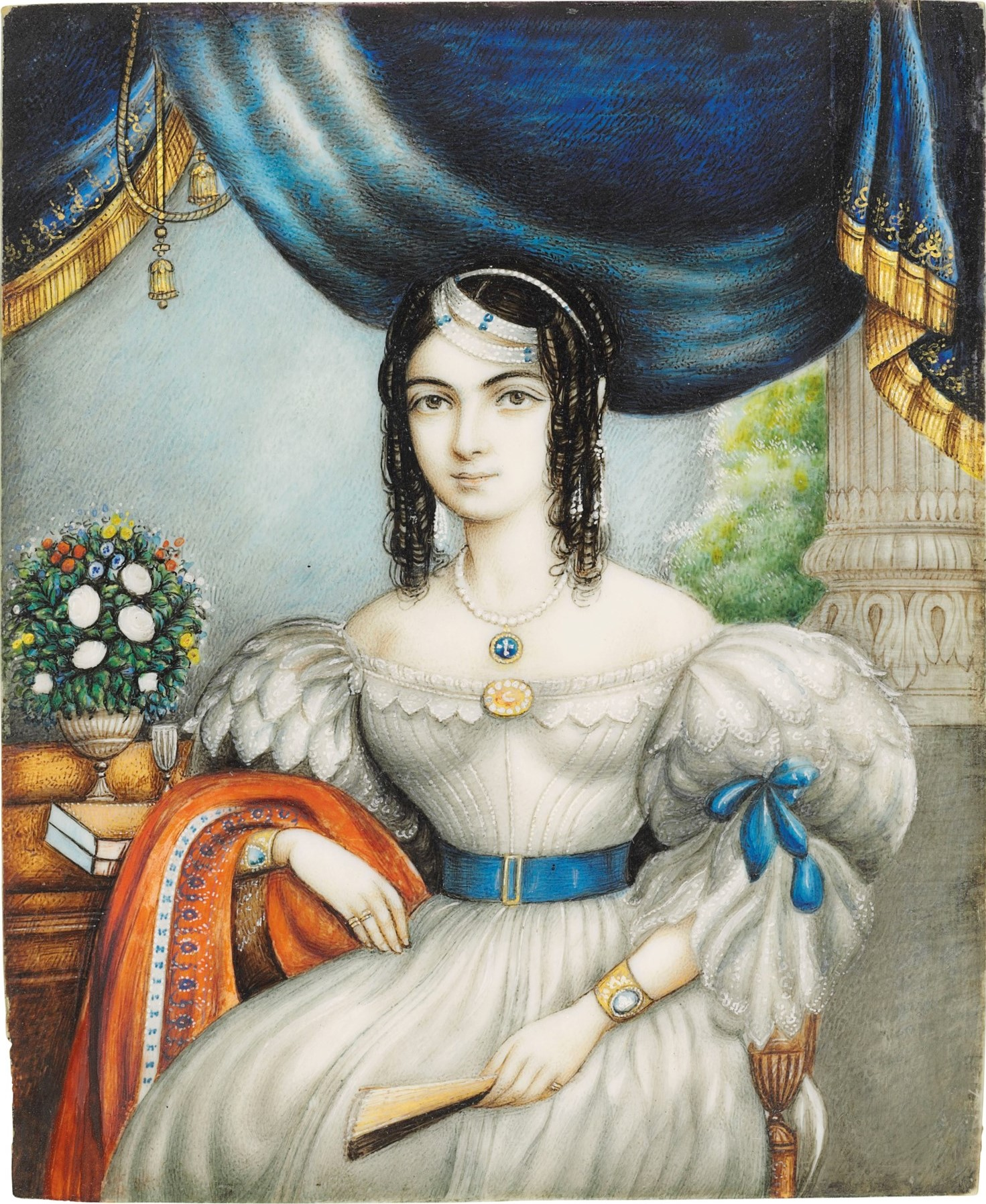
Begum Sahiba Zeenat Mahal in European dress

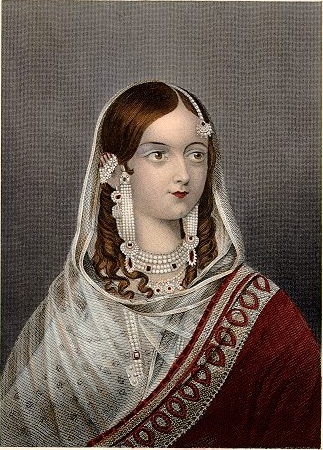
A portraiture of Zeenat Mahal

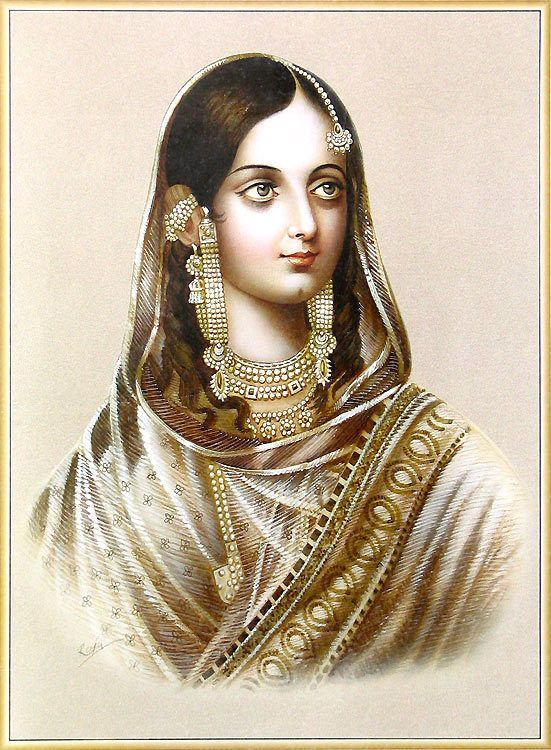
A portraiture of Zeenat Mahal

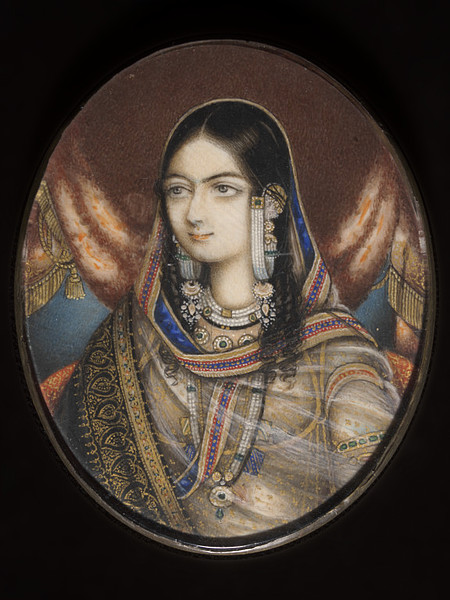
A portraiture of Zeenat Mahal

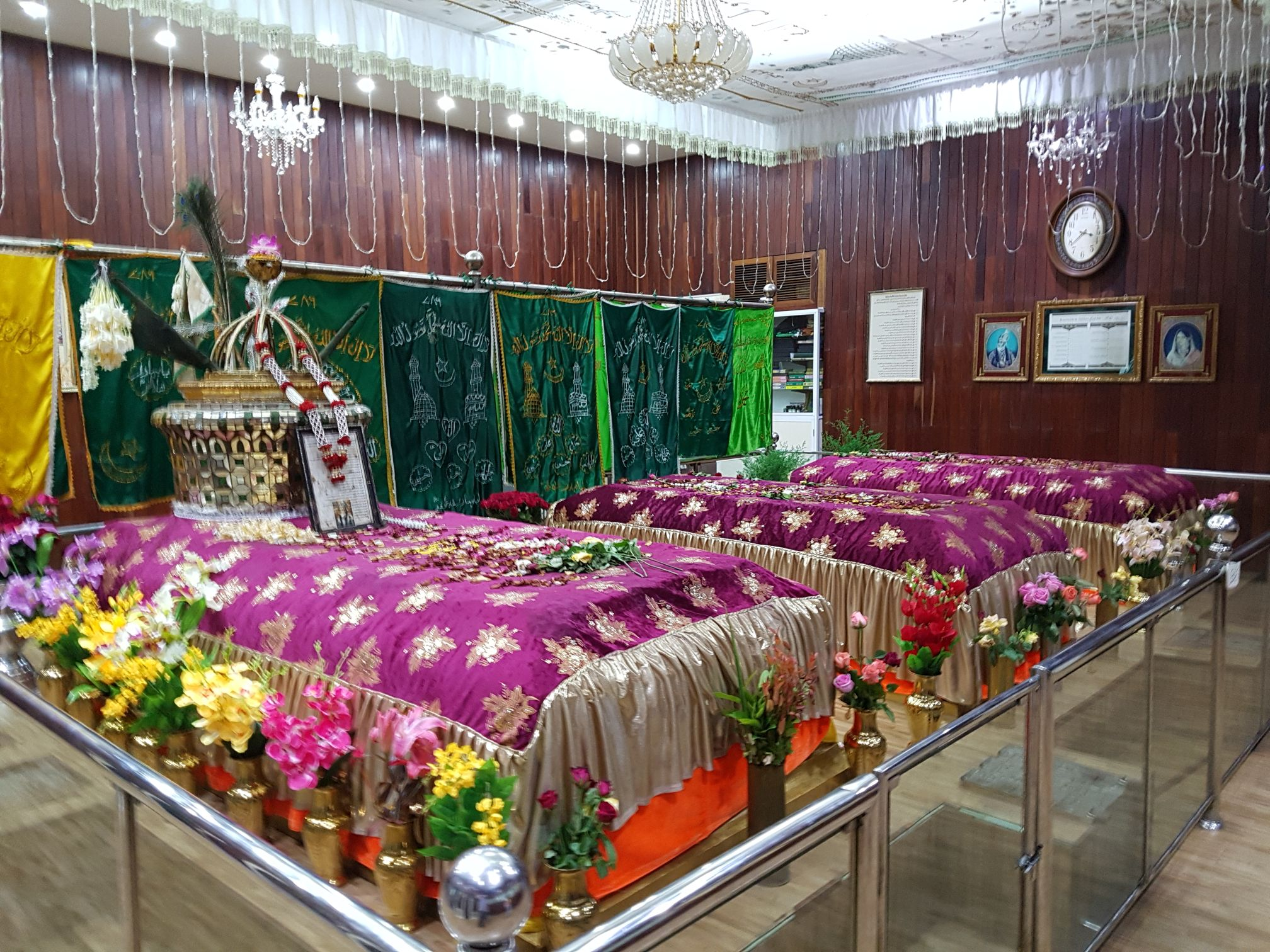
Zeenat Mahal's tomb in Yangon

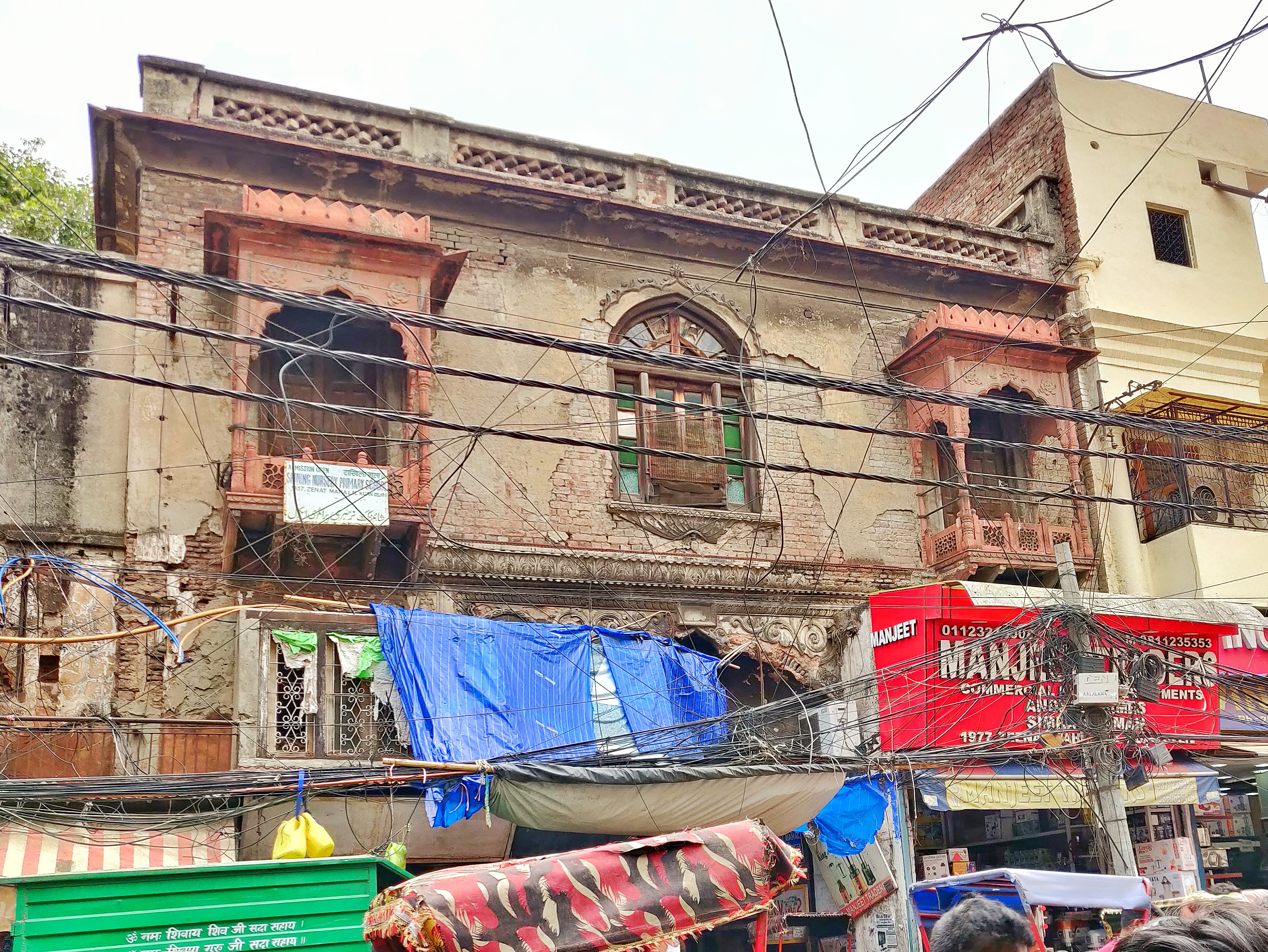
Zeenat Mahal's haveli at Lal Kuan in Old Delhi

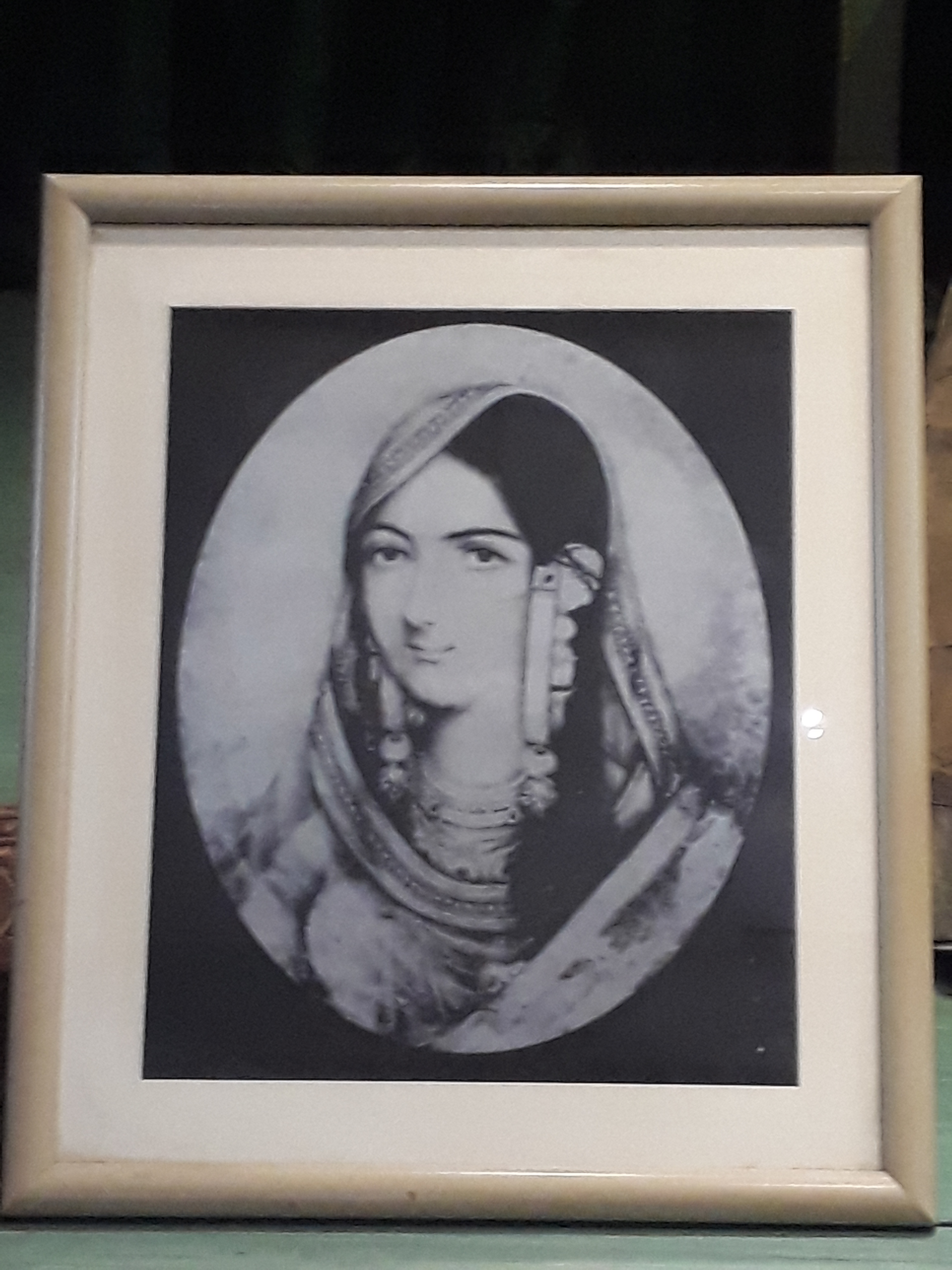
Zinat Mahal image in War Memorial Museum in Red fort

== See also ==
- Zeenat-un-Nissa
