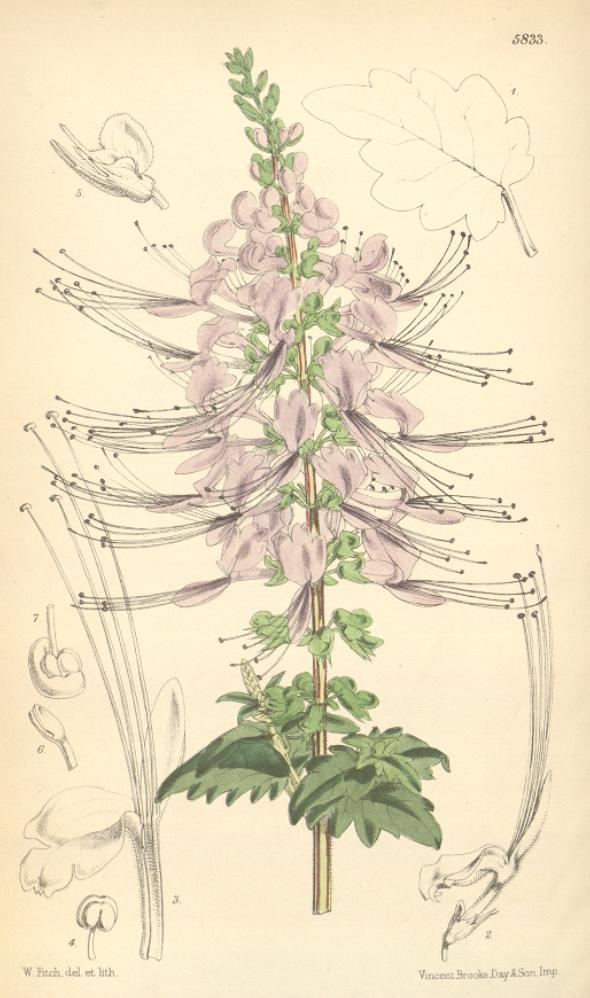
- Orthosiphon stamineus

Scientific classification
- Kingdom: Plantae
- Clade: Embryophytes
- Clade: Tracheophytes
- Clade: Spermatophytes
- Clade: Angiosperms
- Clade: Eudicots
- Clade: Asterids
- Order: Lamiales
- Family: Lamiaceae
- Subfamily: Nepetoideae
- Tribe: Ocimeae
- Genus: Orthosiphon; Benth. 1830

Synonyms
- Clerodendranthus Kudô

= Orthosiphon =

Genus of flowering plants

Orthosiphon is a genus of plants in the family Lamiaceae native to Africa, Southern Asia and Queensland, with one species (O. americanus) in Colombia. They are herbaceous shrubs which grow to a height of 1.5 m (5 ft). Some Orthosiphon species are popular garden plants because of their flowers, which are white and bluish with filaments resembling a cat's whiskers. In the wild, the plants can be seen growing in forests and along roadsides.

Common names in Southeast Asia are Misai Kucing (Malaysia), Kumis Kucing and Remujung (Indonesia), and Yaa Nuat Maeo (Thailand).

== Species ==
1. Orthosiphon adenocaulis A.J.Paton & Hedge - Madagascar
2. Orthosiphon allenii (C.H.Wright) Codd - from Zaire + Tanzania to Zimbabwe
3. Orthosiphon americanus Harley & A.J.Paton - Colombia
4. Orthosiphon argenteus A.J.Paton & Hedge - Madagascar
5. Orthosiphon aristatus a.k.a. Orthosiphon stamineus (Blume) Miq. - China, Indian Subcontinent, Southeast Asia, Queensland; naturalized in Fiji
6. Orthosiphon biflorus A.J.Paton & Hedge - Madagascar
7. Orthosiphon bullosus Chiov. - Somalia
8. Orthosiphon cladotrichos Gürke - Tanzania
9. Orthosiphon cuanzae (I.M.Johnst.) A.J.Paton - Angola
10. Orthosiphon discolor A.J.Paton & Hedge - Madagascar
11. Orthosiphon ellipticus A.J.Paton & Hedge - Madagascar
12. Orthosiphon exilis A.J.Paton & Hedge - Madagascar
13. Orthosiphon ferrugineus Balf.f. - Socotra
14. Orthosiphon fruticosus Codd - Northern Province of South Africa
15. Orthosiphon glandulosus C.E.C.Fisch - Assam, Ranong Province of southern Thailand
16. Orthosiphon hanningtonii (Baker) A.J.Paton - Kenya, Tanzania
17. Orthosiphon humbertii Danguy - Madagascar
18. Orthosiphon incurvus Benth. in N.Wallich - Himalayas from Nepal to Myanmar
19. Orthosiphon lanatus Doan ex Suddee & A.J.Paton - Vietnam
20. Orthosiphon miserabilis A.J.Paton & Hedge - Madagascar
21. Orthosiphon newtonii Briq. - Angola
22. Orthosiphon nigripunctatus G.Taylor - Angola, Zambia
23. Orthosiphon pallidus Royle ex Benth. - tropical + eastern Africa, Madagascar, Arabian Peninsula, India, Pakistan
24. Orthosiphon parishii Prain - Myanmar, Thailand
25. Orthosiphon parvifolius Vatke - Ethiopia, Tanzania, Kenya, Uganda
26. Orthosiphon pseudoaristatus Suddee - Thailand
27. Orthosiphon robustus Hook.f. - Assam
28. Orthosiphon rotundifolius Doan ex Suddee & A.J.Paton - Thailand, Vietnam
29. Orthosiphon ruber A.J.Paton & Hedge - Madagascar
30. Orthosiphon rubicundus (D.Don) Benth. - southern China, Himalayas, Indochina
31. Orthosiphon rufinervis G.Taylor - Angola, Zambia
32. Orthosiphon sarmentosus A.J.Paton & Hedge - Madagascar
33. Orthosiphon scapiger Benth. - Himalayas
34. Orthosiphon scedastophyllus A.J.Paton - Tanzania, Mozambique
35. Orthosiphon schimperi Benth. - tropical + southern Africa from Guinea to Somalia south to Transvaal
36. Orthosiphon schliebenii A.J.Paton - Tanzania
37. Orthosiphon thymiflorus (Roth) Sleesen - tropical Africa, Madagascar, Saudi Arabia, India, Sri Lanka, Indochina, Java
38. †Orthosiphon truncatus Doan ex Suddee & A.J.Paton - Vietnam but believed to be extinct
39. Orthosiphon vernalis Codd - Eswatini
40. Orthosiphon violaceus Briq - Angola
41. Orthosiphon wattii Prain - Assam
42. Orthosiphon wulfenioides (Diels) Hand.-Mazz. - Guangxi, Guizhou, Sichuan, Yunnan
Orthosiphon thymiflorus flower in Talakona forest, in Chittoor District of Andhra Pradesh, India

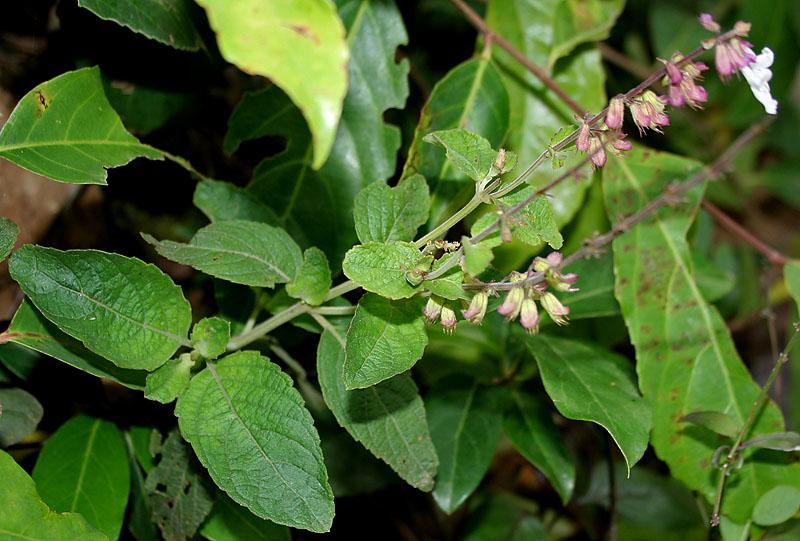
Orthosiphon thymiflorus herb in Talakona forest, in Chittoor District of Andhra Pradesh, India
