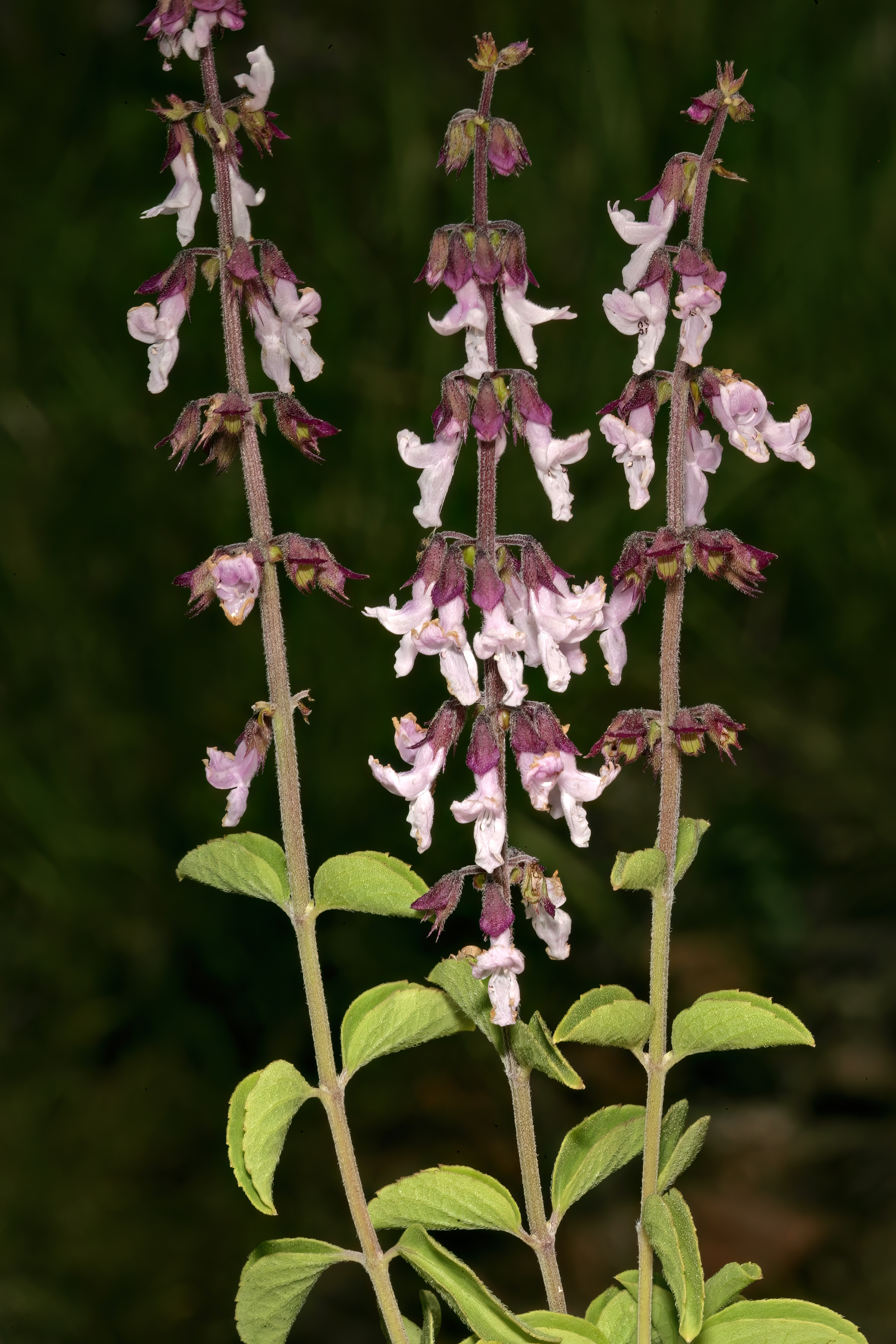

Scientific classification
- Kingdom: Plantae
- Clade: Tracheophytes
- Clade: Angiosperms
- Clade: Eudicots
- Clade: Asterids
- Order: Lamiales
- Family: Lamiaceae
- Genus: Orthosiphon
- Species: O. thymiflorus

Binomial name
- Orthosiphon thymiflorus (Roth) Sleesen

Synonyms
- Ocimum thymiflorum Roth; Plectranthus thymiflorus (Roth) Spreng.; Ocimum suffrutescens Schumach.; Ocimum thonningii Thonn.; Ocimum triste Roth; Orthosiphon australis Vatke; Orthosiphon buryi S.Moore; Orthosiphon calaminthoides Baker; Orthosiphon chevalieri Briq.; Orthosiphon coloratus Vatke; Orthosiphon glabratus Benth.; Orthosiphon glabratus var. africanus Benth.; Orthosiphon glabratus var. parviflorus (Benth.) Gamble; Orthosiphon heterochrous Briq.; Orthosiphon hildebrandtii Baker; Orthosiphon inconcinnus Briq.; Orthosiphon iodocalyx Briq.; Orthosiphon liebrechtsiauum Briq.; Orthosiphon longipes Baker; Orthosiphon marmoritis (Hance) Dunn; Orthosiphon merkeri Gürke; Orthosiphon mollis Baker; Orthosiphon mombasicus Baker; Orthosiphon neglectus Briq.; Orthosiphon petiolaris Miq.; Orthosiphon rabaiensis S.Moore; Orthosiphon rabaiensis var. parvifolia S.Moore; Orthosiphon roseus Briq.; Orthosiphon silvicola Gürke; Orthosiphon sinensis Hemsl.; Orthosiphon somalensis Vatke; Orthosiphon stuhlmannii Gürke; Orthosiphon suffrutescens (Schumach.) J.K.Morton; Orthosiphon tenuifrons Briq.; Orthosiphon thymiflorus var. viscosus (Benth.) Sleesen; Orthosiphon tomentosus var. glabratus (Benth.) Hook.f.; Orthosiphon tomentosus var. parviflorus Benth.; Orthosiphon tomentosus var. rubiginosus C.B.Clarke ex Hook.f.; Orthosiphon tomentosus var. viscosus (Benth.) Hook.f.; Orthosiphon usambarensis Gürke; Orthosiphon viatorum S.Moore; Orthosiphon viscosus Benth.; Orthosiphon wilmsii Gürke; Plectranthus bolusii T.Cooke; Plectranthus marmoritis Hance; Plectranthus tristis (Roth) Spreng.

= Orthosiphon thymiflorus =

Species of flowering plant

Orthosiphon thymiflorus, commonly called the thyme piccadill or thyme Java tea, is a species of flowering plant in the family Lamiaceae. It is found across tropical Africa, in Madagascar, and in tropical Asia from Sri Lanka and peninsular India to China and Indonesia.

== Description ==
This species is a perennial herb with a straggling habit, becoming somewhat shrubby with age, flowering early and developing a small rootstock with several ascending stems up to 0.2–1.5 m (0.66–4.92 ft) tall; not or only weakly aromatic. Stems are erect, square, usually well branched, and hairy, especially along the angles and towards the tips.

Leaves are stalked, ovate to elliptic, mostly 1–4 cm (0.39–1.57 in) long (larger in shaded plants), with toothed margins and variable hairiness, particularly along the veins beneath.

The inflorescence soon becomes lax, with small flower clusters spaced 8–14 mm (0.31–0.55 in) apart. The calyx is distinctive, purple on the upper side and green below, about 3–4 mm (0.12–0.16 in) long at flowering and elongating to 5–7 mm (0.20–0.28 in) in fruit.

The corolla is usually pink, occasionally white or mauve, 8–10 mm (0.31–0.39 in) long, with a straight tube and a hooded lower lip enclosing the stamens.

Nutlets are small, brown, broadly egg-shaped, about 0.9–1.2 mm (0.035–0.047 in) long, and produce a small amount of mucilage when wet.

=== Identification ===
Orthosiphon thymiflorus is closely related to Orthosiphon schimperi. In eastern Africa, the former species can be distinguished by, among other things, its calyx, the upper lip of which is purple, while the lower lip is green. The latter species has a calyx of a uniform purple–red. (This distinction may not hold in other regions.)

Some South African sources currently maintain Orthosiphon suffrutescens as a separate species, but most authorities consider it a synonym of Orthosiphon thymiflorus.

== Distribution and habitat ==
Orthosiphon thymiflorus is recorded from Angola, Benin, Botswana, Burundi, the Central African Republic, southeast China, the Democratic Republic of the Congo, the Republic of the Congo, Eritrea, Eswatini, Ethiopia, Ghana, India, Java, Kenya, Laos, Madagascar, Malawi, Mozambique, Nigeria, Rwanda, Saudi Arabia, Somalia, South Sudan, Sri Lanka, Tanzania, Togo, Uganda, Vietnam, Zambia, Zimbabwe, and the South African provinces of the Eastern Cape, Gauteng, KwaZulu-Natal, Limpopo, Mpumalanga, and the North West. It grows in wooded grassland and bushland and more open, drier forests.

== See also ==
- List of Lamiaceae of South Africa
