= Chrysler Java =

Overview
- Manufacturer: Chrysler
- Production: 1999
- Designer: Kevin Verduyn; Micheal Castiglione

Body and chassis
- Class: Concept car
- Layout: FF

Powertrain
- Engine: 1.4 L I4
- Transmission: 5-speed manual

The Chrysler Java was a concept car created by Chrysler. The Java was first introduced at the 1999 Frankfurt Motor Show. Its design was based upon the Chrysler minivans.

== Design and features ==
The Java's design was more likely architectural than automotive and appears to look like a European compact car intended for European market. It had an egg-like shape with a tall roofline and short overhangs to create a more spacious interior. The interior features a "theatre-style" seating arrangements for rear passengers as it was designed for comfort and practicality. The Java was originally painted in black, but later repainted into a light green-silver metallic.

== Specifications and performance ==
The Java was powered by a 1.4 L 4-cylinder engine producing 80 hp (60 kW) and 95 lb⋅ft (129 N⋅m) of torque mated with a five-speed manual transmission. The Java could accelerate from 0 to 60 mph (97 km/h) in approximately 12.9 seconds and had a top speed of 105 mph (169 km/h).
