= HMS Java =

Three 19th-century ships of the Royal Navy have borne the name HMS Java, named after the island of Java in Indonesia.

- The first HMS Java (1806) was a 32-gun fifth rate, originally the Dutch Maria Reijersbergen built at Amsterdam in 1800, and captured from the Dutch on 18 October 1806. The ship was lost, presumed foundered with the loss of all hands, off Rodrigues in the Indian Ocean in March of the following year.
- The second HMS Java (1811) was a 38-gun fifth rate, originally the French Renommée built in 1805 to 1809 at Nantes, and captured from the French on 20 May 1811 off Madagascar. On 29 December 1812 the ship was captured in turn by the American vessel USS Constitution off Brazil, and burnt the following day.
- The third HMS Java (1815) was a 52-gun fourth rate built at Plymouth Dockyard in 1815. Unlike its namesakes, this vessel had a long Royal Navy career, being broken up in November 1862 at Portsmouth.

== See also ==
- Java (disambiguation)
