= Java, Montana =

Ghost town in Richland County, Montana, United States

Coordinates: 47°59′22″N 104°03′07″W

Java is a ghost town in Richland County, Montana, United States, located near Mondak. Named for its first postmaster, Anton Jevnager, who owned a grocery and hardware store in the community when its post office was established in 1907, Java straddles the border with North Dakota, and was noteworthy among local North Dakota residents as the home of the Blind Pig Saloon on the Montana side.
