= Jawani, Ghana =

Community in North East Region, Ghana

Jawani
- Town
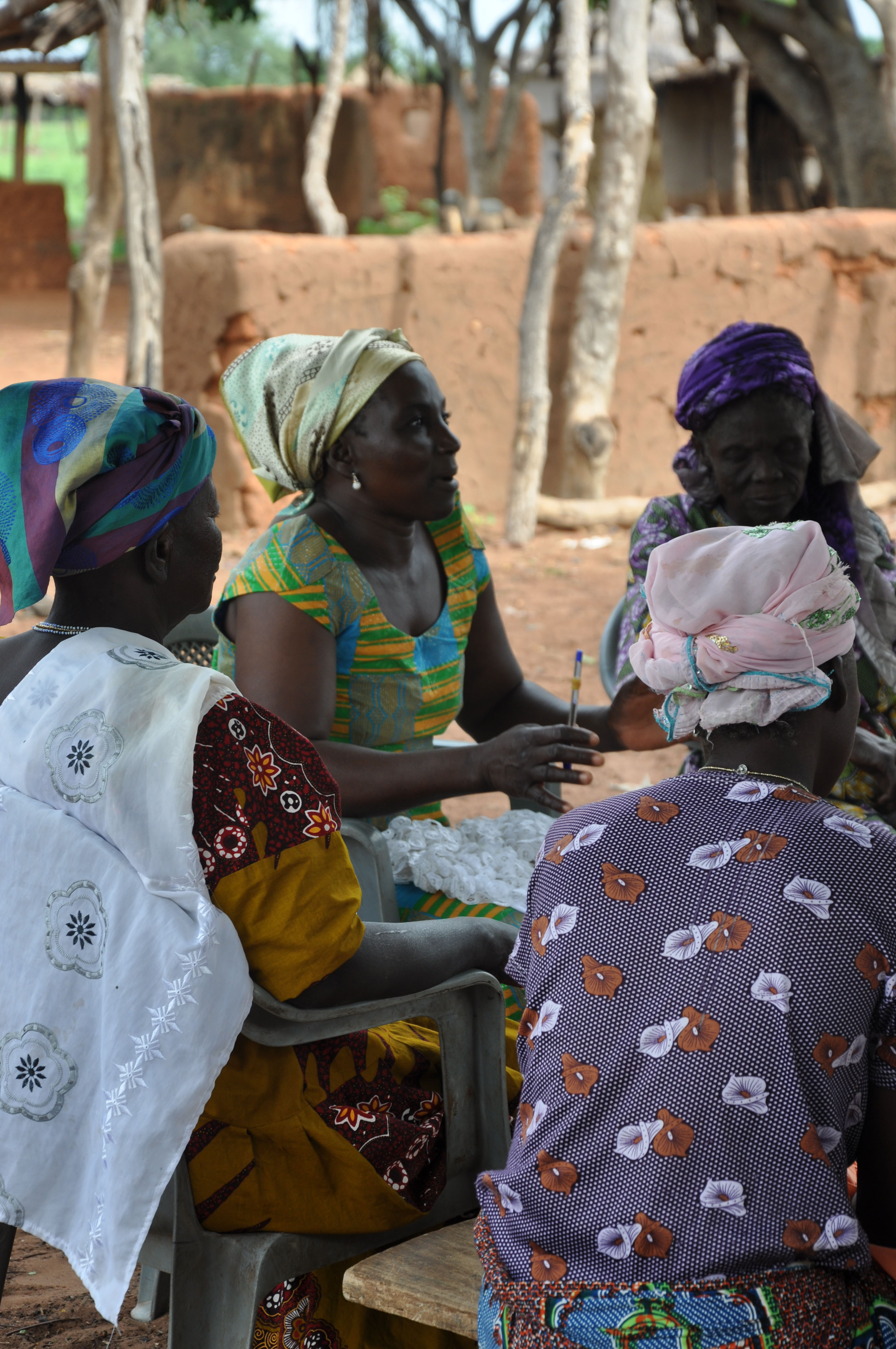
- Country: Ghana
- Region: North East Region
- District: Mamprusi East District

Population
  - Total: —
- Time zone: GMT
  - Summer (DST): GMT

Jawani is a community in the Mamprusi East District in the North East Region of Ghana. It was formerly in the Northern Region. In 2019, the Chief of the community was Namoorana Salifu Adam.
