= Mirza Jawan Bakht (born 1841) =

- Shahzada of the Mughal Empire; Mirza
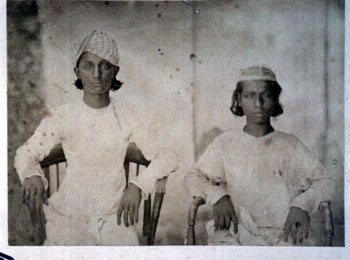
- Mirza Jawan Bakht (left) and his brother Mirza Shah Abbas, c. 1850–60
- Born: 1841; Red Fort, Delhi
- Died: 18 September 1884 (aged 42–43); Yangoon, Myanmar, British Burma
- Spouse: Nawab Shah Zamani
- Issue: Jamshed Bakht
Names
- Shahzada Mirza Mohammad Jawan Bakht Bahadur
- Father: Bahadur Shah II
- Mother: Zinat Mahal
- Religion: Sunni Islam (Hanafi)

Mirza Jawan Bakht (Persian: میرزا جوان بخت; 1841 – 18 September 1884) was the son of Emperor Bahadur Shah II, also called Zafar, and Zinat Mahal. He was the fifteenth son of his father and the only son of his mother. His mother nursed the ambition of placing him on the Mughal throne.

== Biography ==
His mother, Zinat Mahal, saved him all through 1857 rebellion and kept him in safe custody. She began promoting her son, Mirza Jawan Bakht, as heir to the throne over the Emperor's remaining eldest son Mirza Fath-ul-Mulk Bahadur. But due to the primogeniture policy of the British, this was not accepted.

On 2 April 1852, at the age of eleven, he was married in a grand ceremony in Delhi to Nawab Shah Zamani Begum, his mother's niece. His mother planned his lavish 10-day wedding to elevate his stature for the throne.

After the Mughal emperor's death in Rangoon, he was buried there. Jawan Bakht and his teacher Hafiz Mohammed Ibrahim Dehlavi arranged the funeral prayers and burial.

== Issue ==
Mirza Jawan Bahkt's first child born was a stillborn son in 1859. His second child was named Jamshed Bakht. Jamshed had two sons, Bedar Bakht, died in 1880 and Sikandar Bakht, died in 1886.

Mirza Jawan Bakht (born 1841)
Regnal titles
Preceded by Bahadur Shah II as King of Delhi	1862-1884	Succeeded by Jamshed Bakht
