= Yawan =

Yawan may refer to:

- Yawan District, Afghanistan
- Javan, the fourth son of Noah's third son Japheth
- Peba–Yaguan languages, a language family in the northwestern Amazon
