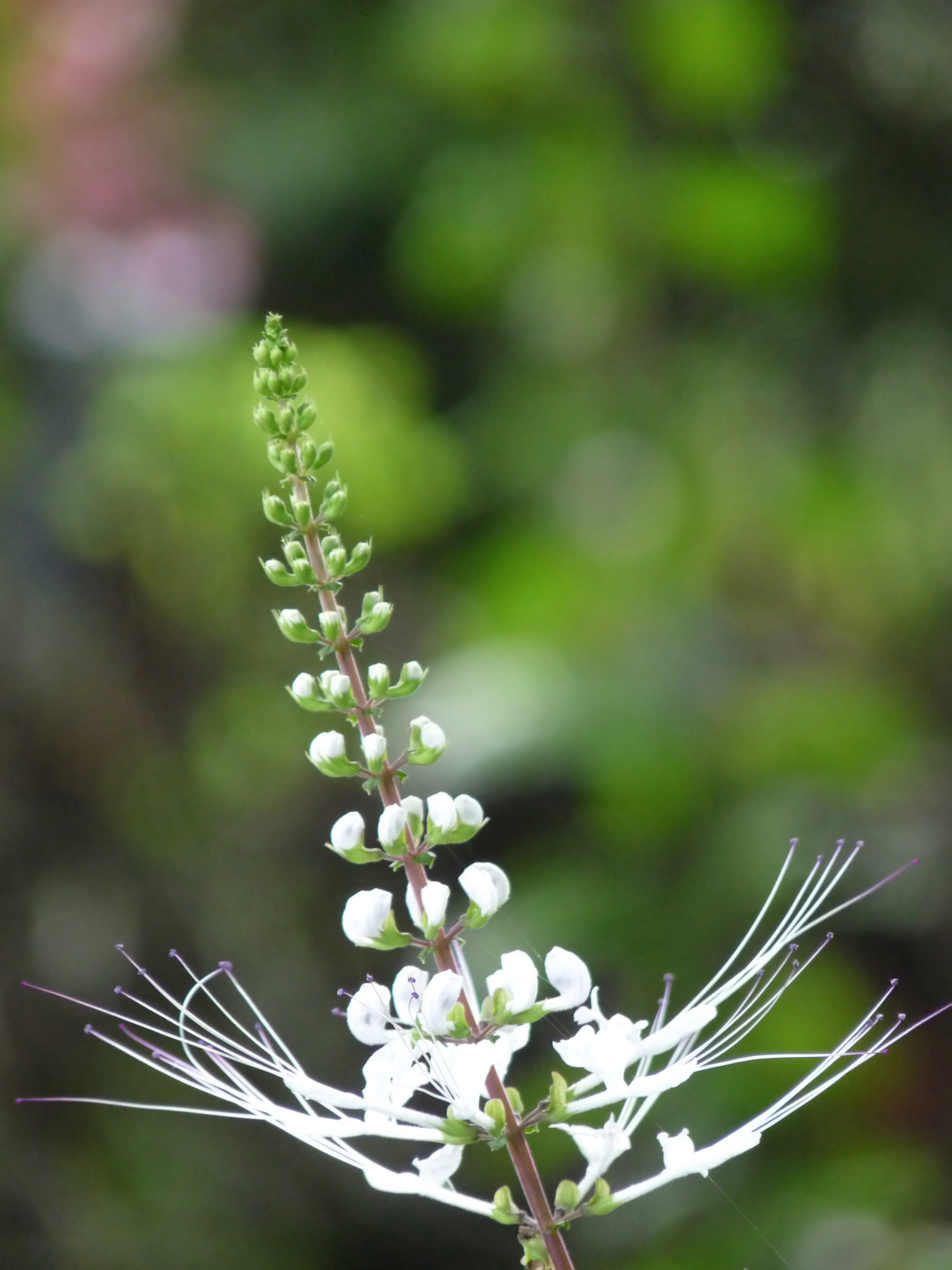

Scientific classification
- Kingdom: Plantae
- Clade: Tracheophytes
- Clade: Angiosperms
- Clade: Eudicots
- Clade: Asterids
- Order: Lamiales
- Family: Lamiaceae
- Genus: Orthosiphon
- Species: O. aristatus

Binomial name
- Orthosiphon aristatus (Blume) Miq.

Synonyms
- Ocimum aristatum Blume; Trichostema spirale Lour., rejected name; Clerodendrum spicatum Thunb; Ocimum grandiflorum Blume 1826 not Lam. 1785; Orthosiphon stamineus Benth.; Orthosiphon spiralis (Lour.) Merr.; Clerodendranthus stamineus (Benth.) Kudô; Orthosiphon velteri Doan; Orthosiphon spicatus (Thunb.) Backer, Bakh.f. & Steenis 1950 not Benth. 1848; Orthosiphon tagawae Murata; Clerodendranthus spicatus (Thunb.) C.Y.Wu

= Orthosiphon aristatus =

Species of flowering plant

Orthosiphon aristatus, commonly known as cat's whiskers or Java tea, is a plant species in the family Lamiaceae (also known Labiatae). The plant is a medicinal herb found mainly throughout southern China, the Indian subcontinent, South East Asia, and tropical Queensland, Australia. As a medical herb, it is used for increasing excretion of urine, lowering uric acid, protecting kidney, reducing oxidative stress, reducing inflammation, protecting liver, protecting stomach, lowering blood pressure, ameliorating diabetes, ameliorating hyperlipidemia, fighting microorganisms and fighting anorexia. It is known as kumis kucing in Indonesia and misai kucing in Malaysia, both of which translate to cat's whiskers.

Orthosiphon aristatus is used in landscaping to attract bees, butterflies and hummingbirds to its nectar.

Varieties

- Orthosiphon aristatus var. aristatus - most of species range
- Orthosiphon aristatus var. velteri Suddee & A.J.Paton - Vietnam
