= Java (1811 ship) =

- The stern of Java in Genoa, 1939

History

United Kingdom
- Name: Java
- Namesake: Java
- Builder: Blackmore & Co., Calcutta
- Launched: 17 December 1811
- Fate: Destroyed 1940

General characteristics
- Tons burthen: 1118, or 1175, or 117519/94 (bm)
- Length: 159 ft 2 in (48.5 m)
- Beam: 40 ft 6 in (12.3 m)
- Propulsion: Sail
- Sail plan: Full Rigged
- Complement: 150
- Armament: 26 × 12&18-pounder guns

Java was a merchant ship launched at Calcutta, British East India, in 1811. She made one voyage under charter to the British East India Company (EIC). She served in the migrant trade between Great Britain and Australia and in Far East trade. She became a coal hulk at Gibraltar circa 1859. She survived until World War II.

== Origins ==
Supposedly Java was a gift to an officer of the EIC. A group of passengers on an EIC ship traveling to China went ashore at Java for a picnic. Locals attacked the picnickers and carried away a young girl. One of the ship's officers led an armed party that succeeded in rescuing the young girl. In gratitude, the girl's father had Java built, and donated to her rescuer. Java bore a figurehead depicting a young girl with her hands crossed over her breast.

== Career ==
Java first appeared in Lloyd's Register (LR) in 1813 with Dennison, master, Paxton & Co. owner, and trade London–India. she was admitted to the registry of Great Britain on 7 October 1813. Captain Henry Templer acquired a letter of marque on 30 November 1813.

Year	Master	Owner	Trade	Source & notes
1815	Dennison	Paxton & Co.	London–India	LR
1820	Hodge	Paxton & Co.	London–India	LR; damages repaired 1816
1825	Hodge	Paxton & Co.	London–India	LR; damages repaired 1816

Between 1824 and 1827 Java made one voyage under charter to the EIC. Her owner, Joseph Hare, who had purchased her in 1825, offered her to the EIC, which chartered her to bring teas from China back from Bengal. It paid £10 18s per ton burthen for 1175 tons. Captain Thomas Driver sailed from the Downs on 26 July 1825. Java was at Saugor on 3 January 1826. She returned to her moorings in England on 13 March 1827.

In 1828 Hare sold her to Fairlie & Co., Calcutta and London. In 1836 Scott & Co., London, purchased her.

Year	Master	Owner	Trade	Source & notes
1830	Driver	Hare & Co.	London–India	LR; damages repaired 1816
1835	T. Driver			
1840	T. Driver	Scott & Co.	London	LR

The South Australian Government chartered Java to transport migrants. Java, Captain Alexander Duthie, then sailed to South Australia. Java sailed from London and Plymouth, England, in October 1839 and arrived in Gulf St Vincent off Adelaide, South Australia, on 6 February 1840. From various reports, between 30 and 50 passengers, including 24-28 children, died of disease, malnutrition, and starvation during the journey. The journey was the subject of a Medical Board review on behalf of the South Australian Commissioners that found that Duffie and the medical officer had treated the passengers badly, and ordered that Scott & Co. not be paid.

In 1841 Java was sold to Joseph Somes, London. He chartered her to the British government as a troop carrier visiting North America, the West Indies, South Africa and New Zealand.

Year	Master	Owner	Trade	Source
1845	J.Locke; W.Parker	J.Somes; J&F Somes	London transport London–S____; London–West Indies	LR; small repairs 1841 & damages repaired 1845
1850	Gilbert	J&F Somes	London–East Indies	LR; damages repaired 1848, damages and small repairs 1850
1855	Robertson	Somes, B[rother]s		LR
1860	J.Smith	J.Hall, Jr.		LR

In 1857 she was sold to J. Hall, Jr., London and sent to Gibraltar from Liverpool, with a cargo of coal. She arrived at Gibraltar on 20 February 1857 in a leaky condition, having struck the nearby Pearl Rock, off Punta Carnero, Spain, in the Strait of Gibraltar.

Circa 1859 she was sold to Gibraltar shipping agent W. H. Smith of Smith, Immosi, & Company to serve there as coal hulk No. 16.

== Fate ==
In 1939, Smith sold her for £500 to the Genoese ship breaker, Giuseppe Riccardi of Sampierdarena, Italy. He had her towed to Genoa on 26 July 1939 for breaking up. On 20 September 1940, Italian frogmen destroyed her with limpet mines in a training exercise. She was the only vessel ever employed by the EIC to have survived until World War II.
