= Mirza Fath-ul-Mulk Bahadur =

Mirza Fakhru
- Mirza
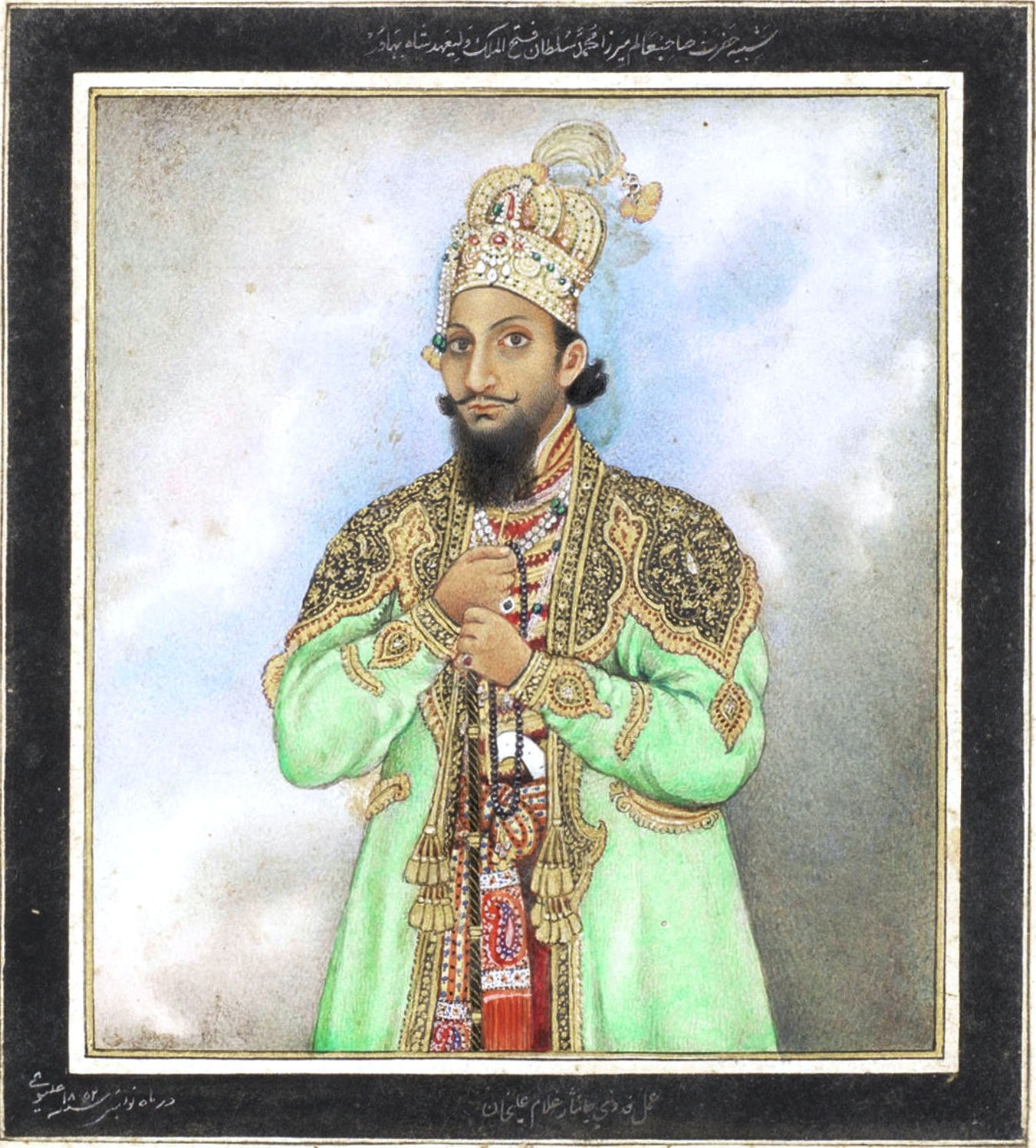
- The portrait of Mirza Fakhru
- Born: 1816–18; Red Fort, Old Delhi, Mughal Kingdom
- Died: 10 July 1856 (aged 38–40); Red Fort, Old Delhi, Mughal Kingdom
- Spouse: Raffat Sultan Begum; Wazir Khanum
- Issue: Mirza Abu Bakht; Mirza Fakhrunda Jamal; Daagh Dehlvi (stepson)
Names
- Fath ul-Mulk, Shahzada Mirza Muhammad Sultan Shah, Firuz Jang, Wali Ahd Bahadur
- House: Mughal
- Father: Bahadur Shah Zafar
- Mother: Rahim Buksh Bai Begum

Mirza Fath-ul-Mulk Bahadur also known as Mirza Fakhru (c. 1816 or 1818 – 10 July 1856) was the last Crown Prince of the Mughal Empire.

== Biography ==
A senior Prince of the Mughal Imperial Family, he was the son of Bahadur Shah Zafar, the last Mughal Emperor, through his wife Rahim Bukhsh Bai Begum.

Fath-ul-Mulk was named Crown Prince in 1853. However he predeceased his father, dying supposedly of cholera in 1856. Other sources suggest that he was poisoned by rivals with symptoms similar to those exhibited by his friend Sir Thomas Metcalfe.

== Family ==
Fath-ul-Mulk was an older brother of Prince Mirza Mughal and the younger brother of former Crown Prince Mirza Dara Bakht.

Fath-ul-Mulk married several wives and was the father of several children. Among his wives was Wazir Khanum, daughter of a rich jeweller and a well-known beauty of the time. Wazir Khanum had previously been married to Shamshuddin, Nawab of Ferozepur Jhirka, a relative and close friend of Mirza Ghalib, and she had borne Nawab Shamshuddin a son, the noted poet Dagh Dehlvi. After the Nawab was hanged for plotting and paying for the murder of British officer William Fraser, Wazir Khanum married Fath-ul-Mulk, and he thus became the step-father of Dagh Dehlvi, who would later become a famous poet.

Among Fath-ul-Mulk's own sons were Mirza Abu Bakht, Mirza Fakhrunda Jamal and Mirza Mohammed baig who moved to Deccan Among his daughters was Sikander Jehan Begum, who was married to a sufi mystic and became the mother of two daughters and a son, Mirza Qutb-e-Alam.
