= SS Java (1865) =

British and French ocean liner built in 1865

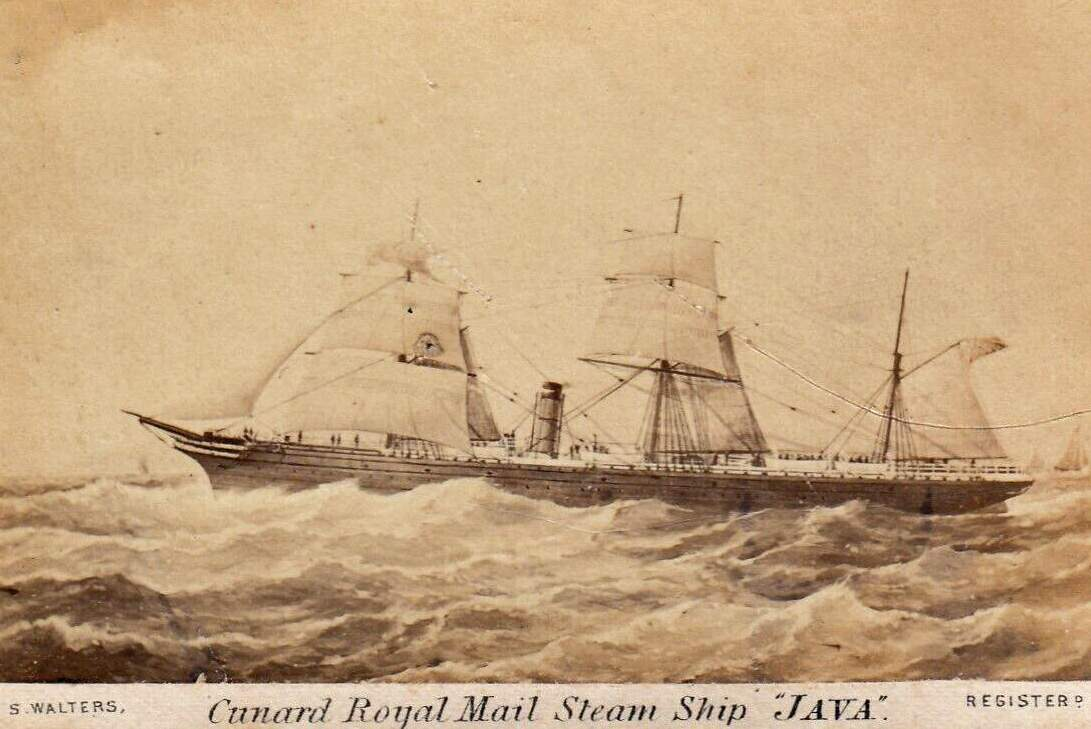
- SS Java

History
- Name: 1865: SS Java; 1878: SS Zeeland; 1889: Electrique; 1892: Lord Spencer
- Namesake: 1865: Java; 1878: Zealand; 1889: Electricity; 1892: John Spencer, 5th Earl Spencer
- Operator: 1865: Cunard Line; 1878: Red Star Line; 1889: French owners; 1892: British owners
- Port of registry: 1865: United Kingdom; 1889: France; 1892: United Kingdom
- Route: 1865: Liverpool–Queenstown–New York; 1878: Antwerp–New York
- Builder: J & G Thomson; Glasgow, Scotland
- Launched: 24 June 1865
- Maiden voyage: Liverpool-Queenstown–New York, 21 October 1865
- Fate: Missing on way San Francisco-New York, 1895

General characteristics
- Tonnage: 2,696 GRT
- Length: 337.1 ft (102.7 m)
- Beam: 42.9 ft (13.1 m)

SS Java was a British and French ocean liner built in 1865 at Glasgow by J. G. Thompson & Co. It served the Cunard Line.

One passenger, the musician Philo Adams Otis, said:

There were only four good ships of the Cunard Company in the Liverpool service in 1873: Russia, Scotia, Cuba, and Java. The two former were side-wheelers and were largely advertised as "carrying no steerage passengers". Among old travellers the two latter ships were respectively called the "rolling Cuba" and the "jumping Java," from certain peculiarities manifested by these ships in heavy weather, not especially conducive to the comfort of the passengers.

In 1877, the ship was re-engined with compound engines by Fawcett, Preston & Co., Liverpool, and chartered to Warren Line, until it had been sold to Red Star Line one year later and renamed to SS Zeeland.

In 1889, it was sold to a French company and renamed the Electrique. In 1892 it was sold again to J. Herron & Co of Liverpool and again renamed the Lord Spencer. During an 1895 voyage from San Francisco to New York it went missing. One account claimed it collided with the fully rigged sailing ship Prince Oscar on 13 July and sank shortly thereafter.
