= Standard Odia =

Standard Odia is the prestige form of the Odia language, associated with the coastal region around Cuttack, Puri, and Bhubaneswar but not limited to speakers from those cities — it is generally spoken and understood by literate Odia speakers across the state, and is the form used in literature, newspapers, education, and formal speech. It is treated as distinct from regional dialects such as the southern (Ganjam, Koraput), western (Sambalpuri), and northern (Baleswar) dialects.

Comparative linguistic studies have identified substantial lexical and grammatical differences between Standard Odia and Sambalpuri while noting structural similarities between the varieties.

An early linguistic survey included a list of standard words and sentences labelled "Oriyā (Standard of Puri)".

== Differences from dialectal forms ==
=== Sentence order ===
Standard Odia places the negative particle nahi after the verb, not before it, and places interrogative (question) words at the end of the clause rather than at the beginning.

Negation placement

| Standard (Odia script) | Standard (Roman) | Dialectal (Roman) | Meaning |
|---|---|---|---|
| ମୁଁ ଡାକେ ନାହିଁ | mu dake nahi | mu nai dake | I do not call |

Interrogation at the end

| Standard (Odia script) | Standard (Roman) | Dialectal (Roman) | Meaning |
|---|---|---|---|
| ତୁମେ ଯିବ କି | tume jiba ki | tume ki jiba | Will you go? |
| ତମ ଜୀବାର କୁଆଡ଼େ | tama jibara kuaade | tama kuaade jiba | Where will you go? |
| ତୁମ ନାମ କଣ | tama naama kana | tama kana naama | What is your name? |
| ତୁମ ଘର କେଉଁଠି | tama ghara keunthi | keunthi tama ghara | Where is your house? |

=== Schwa retention ===
Standard Odia retains the inherent short vowel (schwa) at the middle and end of words, following the spelling closely, whereas many dialectal speakers drop it. This word-final vowel deletion (apocope) is a documented characteristic of dialects such as Sambalpuri.

Examples of word-final vowel deletion in Sambalpuri.
| Standard Odia | Sambalpuri | Meaning |
|---|---|---|
| ଭଲ (bhala) | ଭଲ୍ (bhal) | good |
| ବାଘ (bāgha) | ବାଘ୍ (bāgh) | tiger |
| କୁକୁର (kukura) | କୁକୁର୍ (kukur) | dog |
| ଲୋକ (loka) | ଲୋକ୍ (lok) | people |
| ଗଛ (gacha) | ଗଛ୍ (gach) | tree |
| ଫୁଲ (phula) | ଫୁଲ୍ (phul) | flower |
| ଭାତ (bhāta) | ଭାତ୍ (bhāt) | rice |
| ଘର (ghara) | ଘର୍ (ghar) | house |

=== Retroflex sound ===
Standard Odia retains retroflex consonants (e.g. ଣ, ଡ଼, ଢ଼) that are merged with their dental/alveolar counterparts in some southern and western dialects — for example, pani (ପାଣି, "water") with the retroflex ଣ in standard usage.

=== Plural and singular marking ===
Sentence and word construction for singular/plural reference varies across Odisha, with regional forms sometimes influenced by neighbouring languages such as Hindi.

==== Singular marking ====
| Suffix | Example (Odia script) | Example (Roman) | Meaning |
|---|---|---|---|
| -ti | କଲମତି | kalamati | pen |
| -tiye | ମନୁଷତିଏ | manusatiye | man |

==== Plural marking ====
| Suffix | Example (Odia script) | Example (Roman) | Meaning |
|---|---|---|---|
| -mane | ଲୋକମାନେ | lokamāne | people |
| -gura/guri | ଭାତଗୁଡ଼ା, ଫୁଲଗୁଡ଼ିଏ | bhātaguḍā, phulaguḍie | rice / flowers |

Abstract and mass/uncountable nouns generally take no plural marker (e.g. cini "sugar").

=== Vowel dropping ===
In fast or dialectal speech, the middle vowel -i- in verb suffixes is often dropped, while standard usage retains it. Some dialects (western and northern) also drop the final -nti plural verb ending down to -n.

=== Verb tense paradigm ===
==== Present tense ====
| Tense Form | I | We | You | He/She/It | Plural |
|---|---|---|---|---|---|
| Simple Present | verb + e | verb + u | verb + a | verb + e | verb + anti |
| Present Perfect | verb + ichhi | verb + ichhu | verb + ichha | verb + ichhi | verb + ichhanti |
| Present Continuous | verb + uchhi | verb + uchhu | verb + uchha | verb + uchhi | verb + uchhanti |

==== Past tense ====
| Tense Form | I | We | You | He/She/It | Plural |
|---|---|---|---|---|---|
| Simple Past | verb + ili | verb + ilu | verb + ila | verb + ilaa | verb + ile |
| Past Perfect | verb + ithili | verb + ithilu | verb + ithila | verb + ithilaa | verb + ithile |
| Past Continuous | verb + uthili | verb + uthilu | verb + uthila | verb + uthilaa | verb + uthile |

==== Future tense ====
| Tense Form | I | We | You | He/She/It | Plural |
|---|---|---|---|---|---|
| Simple Future | ibi | ibu | iba | ibaa | ibe |
| Future Perfect | ithibi | ithibu | ithiba | ithibaa | ithibe |
| Future Continuous | uthibi | uthibu | uthiba | uthibaa | uthibe |

== Examples ==
(Roman transliteration, Odia script, and IPA, drawn from the sentence order, schwa retention, and vowel-dropping points above.)

=== Verbs ===
==== Singular ====
===== I — ମୁଁ =====
| Tense | Aspect | Positive (Odia / Transliteration) | Negative (Odia / Transliteration) | English Meaning |
|---|---|---|---|---|
| Present Tense (ବର୍ତ୍ତମାନ କାଳ) | Simple | ମୁଁ କାମ କରେ Mu kama kare | ମୁଁ କାମ କରେ ନାହିଁ Mu kama kare nahĩ | I do work / I do not do work |
| Present Tense (ବର୍ତ୍ତମାନ କାଳ) | Continuous | ମୁଁ କାମ କରୁଛି Mu kama karuchhi | ମୁଁ କାମ କରୁନାହିଁ Mu kama karunahĩ | I am doing work / I am not doing work |
| Present Tense (ବର୍ତ୍ତମାନ କାଳ) | Perfect | ମୁଁ କାମ କରିଛି Mu kama karichhi | ମୁଁ କାମ କରିନାହିଁ Mu kama karinahĩ | I have done work / I have not done work |
| Past Tense (ଅତୀତ କାଳ) | Simple | ମୁଁ କାମ କଲି Mu kama kali | ମୁଁ କାମ କଲି ନାହିଁ Mu kama kali nahĩ | I did work / I did not do work |
| Past Tense (ଅତୀତ କାଳ) | Continuous | ମୁଁ କାମ କରୁଥିଲି Mu kama karuthili | ମୁଁ କାମ କରୁନଥିଲି Mu kama karunathili | I was doing work / I was not doing work |
| Past Tense (ଅତୀତ କାଳ) | Perfect | ମୁଁ କାମ କରିଥିଲି Mu kama karithili | ମୁଁ କାମ କରି ନ ଥିଲି Mu kama kari na thili | I had done work / I had not done work |
| Future Tense (ଭବିଷ୍ୟତ କାଳ) | Simple | ମୁଁ କାମ କରିବି Mu kama karibi | ମୁଁ କାମ କରିବି ନାହିଁ Mu kama karibi nahĩ | I will do work / I will not do work |
| Future Tense (ଭବିଷ୍ୟତ କାଳ) | Continuous | ମୁଁ କାମ କରୁଥିବି Mu kama karuthibi | ମୁଁ କାମ କରୁନଥିବି Mu kama karunathibi | I will be doing work / I will not be doing work |
| Future Tense (ଭବିଷ୍ୟତ କାଳ) | Perfect | ମୁଁ କାମ କରିଥିବି Mu kama karithibi | ମୁଁ କାମ କରି ନ ଥିବି Mu kama kari na thibi | I will have done work / I will not have done work |

===== You — ତୁମେ =====
| Tense | Aspect | Positive (Odia / Transliteration) | Negative (Odia / Transliteration) | English Meaning |
|---|---|---|---|---|
| Present Tense (ବର୍ତ୍ତମାନ କାଳ) | Simple | ତୁମେ କାମ କର; Tume kama kara | ତୁମେ କାମ କର ନାହିଁ Tume kama kara nahĩ | You do work / You do not do work |
| Present Tense (ବର୍ତ୍ତମାନ କାଳ) | Continuous | ତୁମେ କାମ କରୁଛ; Tume kama karucha | ତୁମେ କାମ କରୁନାହଁ Tume kama karunaha | You are doing work / You are not doing work |
| Present Tense (ବର୍ତ୍ତମାନ କାଳ) | Perfect | ତୁମେ କାମ କରିଛ; Tume kama karichha | ତୁମେ କାମ କରିନାହଁ Tume kama karinaha | You have done work / You have not done work |
| Past Tense (ଅତୀତ କାଳ) | Simple | ତୁମେ କାମ କଲ; Tume kama kala | ତୁମେ କାମ କଲ ନାହିଁ Tume kama kala nahĩ | You did work / You did not do work |
| Past Tense (ଅତୀତ କାଳ) | Continuous | ତୁମେ କାମ କରୁଥିଲ; Tume kama karuthila | ତୁମେ କାମ କରୁନଥିଲ; Tume kama karunathila | You were doing work / You were not doing work |
| Past Tense (ଅତୀତ କାଳ) | Perfect | ତୁମେ କାମ କରିଥିଲ; Tume kama karithila | ତୁମେ କାମ କରି ନ ଥିଲ; Tume kama kari na thila | You had done work / You had not done work |
| Future Tense (ଭବିଷ୍ୟତ କାଳ) | Simple | ତୁମେ କାମ କରିବ; Tume kama kariba | ତୁମେ କାମ କରିବ ନାହିଁ Tume kama kariba nahĩ | You will do work / You will not do work |
| Future Tense (ଭବିଷ୍ୟତ କାଳ) | Continuous | ତୁମେ କାମ କରୁଥିବ; Tume kama karuthiba | ତୁମେ କାମ କରୁନଥିବ; Tume kama karunathiba | You will be doing work / You will not be doing work |
| Future Tense (ଭବିଷ୍ୟତ କାଳ) | Perfect | ତୁମେ କାମ କରିଥିବ; Tume kama karithiba | ତୁମେ କାମ କରି ନ ଥିବ; Tume kama kari na thiba | You will have done work / You will not have done work |

===== He / She / It — ସେ / ଏହା =====
| Tense | Aspect | Positive (Odia / Transliteration) | Negative (Odia / Transliteration) | English Meaning |
|---|---|---|---|---|
| Present Tense (ବର୍ତ୍ତମାନ କାଳ) | Simple | ସେ କାମ କରେ Se kama kare | ସେ କାମ କରେ ନାହିଁ Se kama kare nahĩ | He/She does work / He/She does not do work |
| Present Tense (ବର୍ତ୍ତମାନ କାଳ) | Continuous | ସେ କାମ କରୁଛି Se kama karuchhi | ସେ କାମ କରୁନାହିଁ Se kama karunahĩ | He/She is doing work / He/She is not doing work |
| Present Tense (ବର୍ତ୍ତମାନ କାଳ) | Perfect | ସେ କାମ କରିଛି Se kama karichhi | ସେ କାମ କରିନାହିଁ Se kama karinahĩ | He/She has done work / He/She has not done work |
| Past Tense (ଅତୀତ କାଳ) | Simple | ସେ କାମ କଲା Se kama kala | ସେ କାମ କଲା ନାହିଁ Se kama kala nahĩ | He/She did work / He/She did not do work |
| Past Tense (ଅତୀତ କାଳ) | Continuous | ସେ କାମ କରୁଥିଲା Se kama karuthila | ସେ କାମ କରୁନଥିଲା Se kama karunathila | He/She was doing work / He/She was not doing work |
| Past Tense (ଅତୀତ କାଳ) | Perfect | ସେ କାମ କରିଥିଲା Se kama karithila | ସେ କାମ କରି ନ ଥିଲା Se kama kari na thila | He/She had done work / He/She had not done work |
| Future Tense (ଭବିଷ୍ୟତ କାଳ) | Simple | ସେ କାମ କରିବ; Se kama kariba | ସେ କାମ କରିବ ନାହିଁ Se kama kariba nahĩ | He/She will do work / He/She will not do work |
| Future Tense (ଭବିଷ୍ୟତ କାଳ) | Continuous | ସେ କାମ କରୁଥିବ; Se kama karuthiba | ସେ କାମ କରୁନଥିବ; Se kama karunathiba | He/She will be doing work / He/She will not be doing work |
| Future Tense (ଭବିଷ୍ୟତ କାଳ) | Perfect | ସେ କାମ କରିଥିବ; Se kama karithiba | ସେ କାମ କରି ନ ଥିବ; Se kama kari na thiba | He/She will have done work / He/She will not have done work |

==== Plural ====
===== We — ଆମେ =====
| Tense | Aspect | Positive (Odia / Transliteration) | Negative (Odia / Transliteration) | English Meaning |
|---|---|---|---|---|
| Present Tense (ବର୍ତ୍ତମାନ କାଳ) | Simple | ଆମେ କାମ କରୁ Ame kama karu | ଆମେ କାମ କରୁ ନାହିଁ Ame kama karu nahĩ | We do work / We do not do work |
| Present Tense (ବର୍ତ୍ତମାନ କାଳ) | Continuous | ଆମେ କାମ କରୁଛୁ Ame kama karuchhu | ଆମେ କାମ କରୁନାହୁଁ Ame kama karunahũ | We are doing work / We are not doing work |
| Present Tense (ବର୍ତ୍ତମାନ କାଳ) | Perfect | ଆମେ କାମ କରିଛୁ Ame kama karichhu | ଆମେ କାମ କରିନାହୁଁ Ame kama karinahũ | We have done work / We have not done work |
| Past Tense (ଅତୀତ କାଳ) | Simple | ଆମେ କାମ କଲୁ Ame kama kalu | ଆମେ କାମ କଲୁ ନାହିଁ Ame kama kalu nahĩ | We did work / We did not do work |
| Past Tense (ଅତୀତ କାଳ) | Continuous | ଆମେ କାମ କରୁଥିଲୁ Ame kama karuthilu | ଆମେ କାମ କରୁନଥିଲୁ Ame kama karunathilu | We were doing work / We were not doing work |
| Past Tense (ଅତୀତ କାଳ) | Perfect | ଆମେ କାମ କରିଥିଲୁ Ame kama karithilu | ଆମେ କାମ କରି ନ ଥିଲୁ Ame kama kari na thilu | We had done work / We had not done work |
| Future Tense (ଭବିଷ୍ୟତ କାଳ) | Simple | ଆମେ କାମ କରିବୁ Ame kama karibu | ଆମେ କାମ କରିବୁ ନାହିଁ Ame kama karibu nahĩ | We will do work / We will not do work |
| Future Tense (ଭବିଷ୍ୟତ କାଳ) | Continuous | ଆମେ କାମ କରୁଥିବୁ Ame kama karuthibu | ଆମେ କାମ କରୁନଥିବୁ Ame kama karunathibu | We will be doing work / We will not be doing work |
| Future Tense (ଭବିଷ୍ୟତ କାଳ) | Perfect | ଆମେ କାମ କରିଥିବୁ Ame kama karithibu | ଆମେ କାମ କରି ନ ଥିବୁ Ame kama kari na thibu | We will have done work / We will not have done work |

===== They — ସେମାନେ =====
| Tense | Aspect | Positive (Odia / Transliteration) | Negative (Odia / Transliteration) | English Meaning |
|---|---|---|---|---|
| Present Tense (ବର୍ତ୍ତମାନ କାଳ) | Simple | ସେମାନେ କାମ କରନ୍ତି Semane kama karanti | ସେମାନେ କାମ କରନ୍ତି ନାହିଁ Semane kama karanti nahĩ | They do work / They do not do work |
| Present Tense (ବର୍ତ୍ତମାନ କାଳ) | Continuous | ସେମାନେ କାମ କରୁଛନ୍ତି Semane kama karuchhanti | ସେମାନେ କାମ କରୁନାହାନ୍ତି Semane kama karunahanti | They are doing work / They are not doing work |
| Present Tense (ବର୍ତ୍ତମାନ କାଳ) | Perfect | ସେମାନେ କାମ କରିଛନ୍ତି Semane kama karichhanti | ସେମାନେ କାମ କରିନାହାନ୍ତି Semane kama karinahaanti | They have done work / They have not done work |
| Past Tense (ଅତୀତ କାଳ) | Simple | ସେମାନେ କାମ କଲେ Semane kama kale | ସେମାନେ କାମ କଲେ ନାହିଁ Semane kama kale nahĩ | They did work / They did not do work |
| Past Tense (ଅତୀତ କାଳ) | Continuous | ସେମାନେ କାମ କରୁଥିଲେ Semane kama karuthile | ସେମାନେ କାମ କରୁନଥିଲେ Semane kama karunathile | They were doing work / They were not doing work |
| Past Tense (ଅତୀତ କାଳ) | Perfect | ସେମାନେ କାମ କରିଥିଲେ Semane kama karithile | ସେମାନେ କାମ କରି ନ ଥିଲେ Semane kama kari na thile | They had done work / They had not done work |
| Future Tense (ଭବିଷ୍ୟତ କାଳ) | Simple | ସେମାନେ କାମ କରିବେ Semane kama karibe | ସେମାନେ କାମ କରିବେ ନାହିଁ Semane kama karibe nahĩ | They will do work / They will not do work |
| Future Tense (ଭବିଷ୍ୟତ କାଳ) | Continuous | ସେମାନେ କାମ କରୁଥିବେ Semane kama karuthibe | ସେମାନେ କାମ କରୁନଥିବେ Semane kama karunathibe | They will be doing work / They will not be doing work |
| Future Tense (ଭବିଷ୍ୟତ କାଳ) | Perfect | ସେମାନେ କାମ କରିଥିବେ Semane kama karithibe | ସେମାନେ କାମ କରି ନ ଥିବେ Semane kama kari na thibe | They will have done work / They will not have done work |

== See also ==
- Odia language
- Odia grammar
