= Kandana (song) =

An elderly woman singing a kandana' in Baleswari Odia.

Kandanas or bahunas are folk mourning songs with lyrics in Odia language that are mostly sung by women during marriage in the Indian state of Odisha. Maidens generally sing these songs during the wedding. The songs consist of lyrics depicting the sorrow of separation from their own family as they start living with their in laws after the wedding. The bride and other women of her family generally weep reciting these songs towards the end of the wedding.
