= Kusupur =

- Village
- Location in Odisha, India Kusupur (India)
- Coordinates: 20.614361°N 86.204086°E
- Country: India
- State: Odisha
- District: Cuttack

Languages
  - Official: Odia
- Time zone: UTC+5:30 (IST)
- PIN: 754205
- Telephone code: 0671
- Vehicle registration: OD-05
- Nearest city: Cuttack
- Literacy: 95%
- Lok Sabha constituency: Kendrapara
- Climate: Humidity (Köppen)
- Avg. summer temperature: 45 °C (113 °F)
- Avg. winter temperature: 18 °C (64 °F)
- Website: odisha.gov.in

Kusupur is a village in Odisha, India.

The village is known for the GajaLaxmi Puja, Dasahara and Dola. Jagannath Temple called Birupa Srikhetra, Maa Narayani Chandi, Maa Pingulei, Gopinath Mandir, Maa Sidhesware, Mausimaa mandira, Akhandalamani, Tarini Mandire and Syamasundar are the deities of the village.

Most of the people are occupied in business or the service industries; a few live from agriculture. Two U.P Schools one for boys and one for girls were established before Independence. Nanda Kishore Vidya Mandir, a Government High School named after Pallikabi Nanda Kishore Bal, was established in 1945.

Facilities include a bank, a sub-post office, telephone exchange, government high school, full electrification, and pacca road and drainage system.

It is the birthplace of Pallikabi Nanda Kishore Bal.
