= Bhulia =

Hindu caste from Odisha

Regions with significant populations
- India

Languages
- Odia, Bhulia

Related ethnic groups
- Tanti

Bhulia is an Indian Hindu caste originally from western Odisha but presently found throughout Odisha.

The Bhulia have a high position among the weaver caste system. They have no sub castes. They are a weaver caste known primarily for their tie-dye fabrics (known as sambalpuri).

Bhulia caste members all use the surname Meher, and are therefore sometimes also referred to as the Bhulia Tanti (tanti being a generic term for all weaver castes).

== Kapta ==
Kapata also called "Than", was a cotton piece good produced in various dimensions. Bhulia weavers were used to weave this cloth. It was a handwoven native cloth primarily used for female clothes such as blouses.

In Kannada language "Kapata is an article of cloth".
