= Ganjami Odia =

Southern dialect of the Odia language

- Southern Odia
- ଗଞ୍ଜାମୀ
- Native to: India
- Region: Odisha (Ganjam, Gajapati, Kandhamal) & Andhra Pradesh (Srikakulam District, Parvathipuram District)
- Ethnicity: Odias
- Language family: Indo-European: Indo-Iranian; Indo-Aryan; Eastern; Odia; Ganjami Odia
- Writing system: Odia

Language codes
- ISO 639-3: –
- Glottolog: sout2666 Southern Oriya

Ganjami Odia (ଗଞ୍ଜାମୀ ଓଡ଼ିଆ) or Southern Odia or commonly known as Brahmapuria is a variety of the Odia language spoken in Ganjam, Gajapati and Kandhamal districts of Odisha and in the Srikakulam district of Andhra Pradesh. The variant spoken in Brahmapur is known as Brahmapuria (ବ୍ରହ୍ମପୁରିଆ).

In September 2024, it came to light that two wooden inscriptions believed to be engraved during the first half of 20th century were found at Paralakhemundi and Ranadevi in Gajapati district.

== Comparison ==
The following is a list of common (but not exhaustive) differences between Ganjami and standard Odia (some of these are used exclusively in informal speech):

Standard Odia	Ganjami Odia
Kana (କଣ/କଅଣ)	Kiana (କିଅଣ)/Kissa(କିସ)/kian(କିଅଂ)
Tarkāri (ତରକାରି)	Tuna/Tiana (ତୁଣ/ ତିଅଣ)
Loka (ଲୋକ)	Noka (ନୋକ)
Luna (ଲୁଣ)	Nuna (ନୁଣ)
Oltā (ଓଲଟା)	Ultā (ଉଲଟା)
Birakta (ବିରକ୍ତ)	Bijāra (ବିଜାର)
Goliā ghānti (ଗୋଳିଆ ଘାଣ୍ଟି)	Alara (ଆଲରା)/AluBila(ଆଲୁ ବିଲା)
Receipe-Khatā (ଖଟା)	Ambila (ଆମ୍ବିଳ)/Aambilaa (ଆମ୍ବିଳା)
Taste-Khata (ଖଟା)	Aambili(ଆମ୍ବିଳୀ)
Sajanā (ସଜନା)	Munikā (ମୁନିକା)/chhuin(ଛୁଇଁ)
Bandhākobi (ବନ୍ଧାକୋବି)	Patrakobi (ପତ୍ରକୋବି)
Gudie (ଗୁଡ଼ିଏ)	Menche (ମେଞ୍ଚେ)
Jemiti Semiti Kemiti(ଯେମିତି ସେମିତି କେମିତି)	Jinti Sinti Kinti (ଜିନ୍ତି ସିନ୍ତି କିନ୍ତି)
Thipi (ଠିପି)	Khapa (ଖାପ)
Tala(ତାଲା)	Geda(ଗେଡ଼ା)
Pitiba(ପିଟିବା)	Koddiba(କୋଡ୍ଡିବା)
Khaiba(ଖାଇବା)	Gemphiba(ଗେମ୍ଫିବା)(informal)
Kuapathara(କୁଆପଥର)	Kaupathara(କାଉପଥର)/Karaka(କରକା)
Kakharu(କଖାରୁ)	Boitalu(ବୋଇତାଳୁ)
Teka(ଟେକା)	Dhenkala(ଢେଙ୍କାଳ)
Jhadu(ଝାଡ଼ୁ)	Chhanchuni(ଛାଞ୍ଚୁଣି)
Simba(ଶିମ୍ବ)	Jhata(ଝଟା)
tentuli(ତେନ୍ତୁଳି)	kainya(କଇଁଆ)
Drinking(ପିଇବା)	Tendiba(ତେଣ୍ଡିବା)
Bhijeiba(ଭିଜେଇବା)	Batreiba(ବତ୍ରୈବା)/Batureiba(ବତୁରେଇବା)
Semane (ସେମାନେ)	Tankemane(ତାଙ୍କେମାନେ)
Amane (ଏମାନେ)	Aankemane(ଆଙ୍କେମାନେ)
Hetuheba(ହେତୁହେବା)	Manepadiba(ମନେପଡ଼ିବା)
Bhulijiba (ଭୁଲିଯିବା)	Pasorideba (ପାସୋରିଦେବା)
Kunduri (କୁନ୍ଦୁରି)	Toroda (ତୋରଡା)
