= Bhulia dialect =

Bhulia or Bhuliya is an Indo-Aryan dialect which carries the same name as the Bhulia people of India. It has mainly been classified as a dialect of Chhattisgarhi which in itself is considered a dialect of Hindi.

== History ==
The Bhulia people are reported to have migrated from Chhattisgarh to Odisha and carried their language with them. In the past, Bhulia was reported to be an Odia dialect as it utilizes Odia script. However, one report made in the early 1900s claims the dialect has been reclassified as a form of Chhattisgarhi.

A 1891 Census reported about 9,000 speakers of the dialect. In 1904, a survey done found about 13,000 speakers, primarily located in the pre-independence Sonpur and Patna states.

== Script ==
Despite being considered a dialect of Chhattisgarhi, the dialect uses the Odia script.

== Vocabulary ==
Volume 6 of the Linguistics Survey of India contains a table of vocabulary from various Chhattisgarhi dialects (including Bhulia) and their transliteration in English. The following table displays some of the book's transliterations:

Numbers
English	Bhulia
one	eka
two	dui
three	tini
four	chāri
five	pā̃ncha
six	chhaa
seven	sȧt
eight	āṭh
nine	naa
ten	daś

Subject Pronouns
English	Bhulia
I	muĩ
you	tuĩ
we	āmi-māné, āmé-māné, ām-māné
he	ō-māné
they	oĩ-māné, ō-māné

== Discrepancies ==
Some sources claim that Bhulia is a "tribal language" or is spoken by tribals. However, there is no consensus as to which tribal group uses this language.

Other sources claim that the Bhulia community speaks Laria, but still acknowledge Bhulia as a dialect of Chhattisgarhi. Similarly, a 2008 magazine claims that Laria and Bhulia (spelled Lariya and Bhuliya) are dialects of the Chhattisgarhi branch of Indo-European languages. A different source claims that Bhulia is simply a dialect of Laria, and Laria is another name for Chhattisgarhi. To add to the complexity, there are claims that locals do not make any sort of difference between Laria and Bhulia. There are also no sources that note if the Bhulia community themselves speaks the Bhulia language.
