= Nanda Kishore Bal =

Poet from Odisha, India

- Born: Rasananda Jena; 22 December 1875; Kusupur village, Odisha
- Died: 1 July 1928 (aged 52)
- Occupations: Poet, novelist
- Relatives: Bhajanananda Jena, Hiranmayee Devi (parents)
- Writing career
- Period: Nineteenth century

Nanda Kishore Bal (22 December 1875 – 1 July 1928), was an Indian poet of the era of initial modernity in Odia poetry. He was born at Kusupur village in the Cuttack district of Odisha. He was initially named as Rasananda Jena. Later he was adopted by her aunt and then came the name Nanda Kishore Bal. He is popularly known as "Palli Kabi" (the poet of rural life) for his tender lyrics, celebrating the beauty of rural Odisha in his poems.

Pallikabi Nanda Kishore Bal was a poet of the rural scene, portraying its simplicity, its superstitions and festivals. His popular lyrics for children Nana Baya Gita are sung to the accompaniment of music. He wrote several poems that reveal his strong spiritual inclination, and sharp awareness of social problems. Among his collections are, Nirjharini(The Stream), Palli Chitra (The picture of countryside), Basanta-Kokila, Tarangini, Charuchitra, Nirmalya, Prabhata Sangeeta, Sandhya Sangita, Krushna Kumari and Sarmishtha.

Nanda Kishore Bal wrote about a hundred sonnets which are scattered throughout his collections. His sonnets deal with both nature and personal suffering, and reveal high poetic sensibility. These sonnets are known for their restrained thoughts and versification.

Kanakalata by Nanda Kishore is a novel published in 1925. A substantial part of this novel was actually published in serialized form in Utkal Sahitya in 1913. The plot of the novel is an indictment of the evils of dowry system in rural aristocratic society, and the predicament of the child-widows, who were condemned into a life of anguish and suffering.

== See also ==
- Odia literature
- Odia language
- List of Indian poets
- Odia literature
- Odia language
