= Odia grammar =

Odia grammar is the study of the morphological and syntactic structures, word order, case inflections, verb conjugation and other grammatical structures of Odia, an Indo-Aryan language spoken in South Asia.

== Morphology ==
Morphology is the identification, analysis and description of the structure of morphemes and other units of meaning in the Odia language. Morphemes (called ରୁପିମ) are the smallest units of the Odia language that carry and convey a unique meaning and is grammatically appropriate. A morpheme in Odia is the most minuscule meaningful constituent which combines and synthesizes the phonemes into a meaningful expression through its (morpheme's) form & structure. Thus, in essence, the morpheme is a structural combination of phonemes in Odia. In other words, in the Odia language, the morpheme is a combination of sounds that possess and convey a meaning. A morpheme is not necessarily a meaningful word in Odia. In Odia, every morpheme is either a base or an affix (prefix or a suffix).

== Nouns ==
Nouns are those which are inflected by number, gender or case markers.

=== Number ===
There are two types of numbers in Odia:

- singular- ଏକବଚନ ekabacana
- plural- ବହୁବଚନ bahubacana

Singular denotes one and only one person or thing and the noun may be followed or preceded by singular specifiers or singular number markers. Plural which denotes number more than one person or thing, is formed by the addition of plural suffixes to the nouns which usually occur as singular.

The singular number markers occur as suffix:

Singular suffix
Suffix	Eg.	Meaning
ଟି ṭi	କଲମଟି kalamaṭi	pen
ଟା ṭā	ଝିଅଟା jhiaṭā	daughter
ଟିଏ ṭie	ପିଲାଟିଏ pilāṭie	child

The plural number occur with nominal forms as:

No suffix- uncountable nouns
Eg	Meaning
ଚିନି cini	sugar
ବାଲି bāli	sand

Plural suffix
Suffix	Eg.	Meaning
ମାନେ māne	ଲୋକମାନେ lokamāne	people
ମାନ māna	ଗ୍ରନ୍ଥମାନ granthamāna	holy books
ଗୁଡ଼ା guṛā (guḍā)	ଭାତଗୁଡ଼ା bhātaguḍā	boiled rice
ଗୁଡ଼ାଏ guṛāe (guḍāe)	ଫଳଗୁଡ଼ାଏ phaḷaguḍāe	fruits
ଗୁଡ଼ାକ guṛāka (guḍāka)	ଚାଉଳଗୁଡ଼ାକ cāuḷaguḍāka	rice
ଗୁଡ଼ିଏ guṛie (guḍie)	ଫୁଲଗୁଡ଼ିଏ phulaguḍie	flowers
ଗୁଡ଼ିକ guṛika (guḍika)	ନଦୀଗୁଡ଼ିକ nadīguḍika	rivers
ଏ e	ପିଲେ pile	children
ସବୁ sabu	ଗାଁସବୁ gā̃sabu	villages
ଶ୍ରେଣୀ śreṇī	ପର୍ବତଶ୍ରେଣୀ parbataśreṇī	mountains
ଯାକ ẏāka (jāka)	ଘରଯାକ gharajāka	houses

=== Gender ===
There is no grammatical gender in Odia, instead gender is lexical. Though gender plays no major role in grammatical agreement between subject and predicate but it is accounted for in nominal inflections. There are three types of gender:

- masculine- ପୁଲିଙ୍ଗ puliṅga
- feminine- ସ୍ତ୍ରୀଲିଙ୍ଗ striliṅga
- common- ଉଭୟଲିଙ୍ଗ ubhayaliṅga
- neuter- କ୍ଲୀବଲିଙ୍ଗ klibaliṅga

Different words for gender
Male	Meaning	Female	Meaning
ବାପା bāpā	father	ମା mā	mother
ପୁଅ pua	son	ଝିଅ jhia	daughter
ଭାଇ bhāi	brother	ଭଉଣୀ bhauṇī	sister
ସ୍ୱାମୀ swāmī	husband	ସ୍ତ୍ରୀ strī	wife
ରାଜା rājā	king	ରାଣୀ rāṇī	queen
ଷଣ୍ଢ ṣaṇḍha	bull	ଗାଈ gāī	cow

Prefix
Male	Meaning	Female	Meaning
ପୁରୁଷ ଲୋକ purusha loka	male person	ସ୍ତ୍ରୀ ଲୋକ stri loka	female person
ପୁଅ ପିଲା pua pilā	male child	ଝିଅ ପିଲା jhia pilā	female child
ପୁରୁଷ ଯାତ୍ରୀ purusha jātri	male passenger	ମହିଳା ଯାତ୍ରୀ mahiḷā jātri	female passenger
ଅଣ୍ଡିରା କୁକୁର aṇḍirā kukura	male dog	ମାଈ କୁକୁର māi kukura	female dog
ଅଣ୍ଡିରା ଛେଳି aṇḍirā cheḷi	male goat	ମାଈ ଛେଳି māi cheḷi	female goat

Suffix
Suffix	Male	Meaning	Female	Meaning
ଆ ā	ସଭ୍ୟ sabhya	male member	ସଭ୍ୟା sabhyā	female member
ଆ ā	ଶିଷ୍ୟ śishya	male student	ଶିଷ୍ୟା śishyā	female student
ଆ ā	ଦୁଷ୍ଟ dushṭa	naughty(m)	ଦୁଷ୍ଟା dushṭā	naughty(f)
ଆ ā (morpho-phonemic change- ଅ a to ଇ i)	ବାଳକ bāḷaka	boy	ବାଳିକା bāḷikā	girl
ଆ ā (morpho-phonemic change- ଅ a to ଇ i)	ଗାୟକ gāyaka	male singer	ଗାୟିକା gāyikā	female singer
ଆ ā (morpho-phonemic change- ଅ a to ଇ i)	ନାୟକ nāyaka	actor	ନାୟିକା nāyikā	actress
ଆ ā (morpho-phonemic change- ଅ a to ଇ i)	ଶିକ୍ଷକ śikshaka	male teacher	ଶିକ୍ଷିକା śikshikā	female teacher
ଈ i	ପୁତ୍ର putra	son	ପୁତ୍ରୀ putri	daughter
ଈ i	ବୁଢ଼ା buṛhā	old man	ବୁଢ଼ୀ buṛhi	old woman
ଈ i	କୁମାର kumāra	young boy	କୁମାରୀ kumāri	young girl
ଈ i	ସୁନ୍ଦର sundara	handsome(m)	ସୁନ୍ଦରୀ sundari	beautiful(f)
ଈ i	ଦେବ deba	god	ଦେବୀ debi	goddess
ଈ i (morpho-phonemic change- ଆ ā to ଈ i)	ଟୋକା ṭokā	boy	ଟୋକୀ ṭoki	girl
ଈ i (morpho-phonemic change- ଆ ā to ଈ i)	ଛୋଟା choṭā	lame(m)	ଛୋଟୀ choṭi	lame(f)
ଈ i (morpho-phonemic change- ଅ a to ଆ ā)	କଣା kaṇā	blind(m)	କାଣୀ kāṇi	blind(f)
ଈ i (morpho-phonemic change- ଅ a to ଆ ā)	ସଳା saḷā	brother-in-law	ସାଳୀ sāḷi	sister-in-law
ଈ i (morpho-phonemic change- ଆ ā to ରୀ ri)	ନେତା netā	male leader	ନେତ୍ରୀ netri	female leader
ଈ i (morpho-phonemic change- ଆ ā to ରୀ ri)	ରଚୈତା racaitā	author	ରଚୈତ୍ରୀ racaitri	female author
ଣୀ ṇi	ଚୋର cora	male thief	ଚୋରଣୀ coraṇi	female thief
ଣୀ ṇi	ମୂଲିଆ muliā	male labourer	ମୂଲିଆଣୀ muliāṇi	female labourer
ଣୀ ṇi (morpho-phonemic change- ଅ a to ଆ ā)	ଠାକୁର ṭhākura	god	ଠାକୁରାଣୀ ṭhākurāṇi	goddess
ଣୀ ṇi (morpho-phonemic change- ଅ a to ଆ ā)	ମାଷ୍ଟର māshṭara	male teacher	ମାଷ୍ଟ୍ରାଣୀ māshṭrāṇi	female teacher
ଣୀ ṇi (morpho-phonemic change- ଅ a to ଆ ā)	ତନ୍ତୀ tanti	male weaver	ତନ୍ତୀଆଣୀ tantiāṇi	female weaver
ଣୀ ṇi (morpho-phonemic change- ଅ a to ଆ ā)	ଡାକ୍ତର ḍāktara	male doctor	ଡାକ୍ତରାଣୀ ḍāktarāṇi	female doctor
ଣୀ ṇi (morpho-phonemic change- ଅ a to ଉ u)	ବାଘ bāgha	tiger	ବାଘୁଣୀ bāghuṇi	tigress
ଣୀ ṇi (morpho-phonemic change- ଅ a to ଉ u)	ଗଧ gadha	male donkey	ଗଧୁଣୀ gadhuṇi	female donkey
ଣୀ ṇi (morpho-phonemic change- ଆ ā to ଉ u)	ଚଷା cashā	male farmer	ଚାଷୁଣୀ cāshuṇi	female farmer
ଣୀ ṇi (morpho-phonemic change- ଇ i to ଉ u)	ମାଳି māḷi	male gardener	ମାଲୁଣୀ māluṇi	female gardener
ଣୀ ṇi (morpho-phonemic change- ଇ i to ଉ u)	ଭିକାରି bhikāri	male beggar	ଭିକାରୁଣୀ bhikāruṇi	female beggar
ନୀ ni	ବନ୍ଦୀ bandi	male prisoner	ବନ୍ଦିନୀ bandini	female prisoner
ନୀ ni	ଧନା dhanā	rich(m)	ଧନିନୀ dhanini	rich(f)

=== Case ===
Case inflection is a common characteristic of inflectional languages and are also known as case markers or "ବିଭକ୍ତି" (bibhakti) in Odia. It is both syntactical and morphological in nature. The function of the case is to indicate the grammatical or semantic relationships between nouns and also between nouns and verbs in a larger syntactic structure. There are 8 types of cases in Odia:

Cases (ବିଭକ୍ତି)
Case	Names of cases in Odia	Singular	Plural
Nominative	କର୍ତ୍ତାକାରକ karttākāraka	∅	-ମାନେ, -ଏ -māne, -e
Accusative	କର୍ମକାରକ karmakāraka	-କୁ -ku	-ମାନଙ୍କୁ -mānanku
Dative	ସମ୍ପ୍ରଦାନ କାରକ sampradāna kāraka	-କୁ -ku	-ମାନଙ୍କୁ -mānanku
Genitive	ସମ୍ବନ୍ଧ କାରକ sambandha kāraka	-ର -ra	-ମାନଙ୍କର -mānankara
Locative	ଅଧିକରଣ କାରକ adhikaraṇa kāraka	-ରେ, -ଠାରେ -re, -ṭhāre	-ମାନଙ୍କରେ, -ମାନଙ୍କଠାରେ -mānankare, -mānankaṭhāre
Instrumental	କରଣକାରକ karaṇakāraka	-ରେ, -ଦ୍ୱାରା, -ଦେଇ -re, -dwārā, -dera	-ମାନଙ୍କରେ, -ମାନଙ୍କଦ୍ୱାରା -mānankare, -mānankadwārā
Ablative	ଅପାଦାନ କାରକ apādāna kāraka	-ରୁ, -ଠାରୁ -ru, -ṭhāru	-ମାନଙ୍କରୁ, -ମାନଙ୍କଠାରୁ -mānankaru, -mānankaṭhāru
Vocative	ସମ୍ବୋଧକ କାରକ sambodhaka kāraka	ହେ, ରେ, ହୋ he, re, ho	

For Vocative case: Due to lack of synthetic inflectional morphemes, a vocative particle is used.

== Pronouns ==
Pronouns are classified both notionally and morphologically.

Personal pronouns are of two types:

- Direct case- used for Nominative case
- Oblique case- used with case inflections (Accusative, Instrumental, Dative, Ablative, Genitive, Locative)

Personal Pronouns
Person	Case	Pronoun	Singular	Pronoun	Plural
1st	Direct	I	ମୁଁ	We	ଆମେ ଆମେମାନେ
1st	Oblique	Me, My, Mine	ମୋ-	Us, Our, Ours	ଆମ- ଆମମାନଙ୍କ-
2nd	Direct	You	ତୁ (informal) ତୁମେ (formal) ଆପଣ (honorific)	You	ତୁମେମାନେ ଆପଣମାନେ (honorific)
2nd	Oblique	You, Your, Yours	ତୋ- (informal) ତୁମ- (formal) ଆପଣଙ୍କ- (honorific)	You, Your, Yours	ତୁମମାନଙ୍କ- ଆପଣମାନଙ୍କ- (honorific)
3rd (distal)	Direct	He/She	ସେ	They	ସେମାନେ
3rd (distal)	Oblique	Him/Her, His/Hers	ତା- (informal) ତାଙ୍କ- (formal)	Them/Their/Theirs	ସେମାନଙ୍କ-

== Adjectives ==
Adjectives
Adjective type	Eg.	Meaning
adjective	ଭଲ ପୁଅ	good boy
adjective	ନାଲି ଫୁଲ	red flower
adjective(numeral)-specifier	ଦଶଟି ଫୁଲ	ten flowers
adjective(numeral)-specifier	ପାଞ୍ଚଟା ଗାଁ	five villages
adjective(numeral)-specifier	ଜଣେ ଛାତ୍ର	a student
adjective(numeral)-specifier	ଦଶ ଜଣ ଶିକ୍ଷକ	ten teachers
adjective(numeral)-quantity/measure	ପାଞ୍ଚ କିଲୋ ପରିବା	5 kg vegetables
adjective(numeral)-quantity/measure	ଦଶ ଲିଟର ତେଲ	10 ltr oil
adjective adjective	ଅତି ବଡ଼ ଘର	very big house
adjective adjective	ଭାରି ସୁନ୍ଦର ପିଲା	very beautiful child
adverb adjective	ଧୀର ମିଠା କଥା	soft sweet talk
compound adverb	କାନ୍ଦ କାନ୍ଦ ମୁଁହ	crying face
compound adverb	ହସ ହସ ଭାବ	smiling appearance
adverb verbal noun	ଧୀର ଚାଲି	slow walking
adverb verbal noun	ଚଞ୍ଚଳ ଖିଆ	quick eating

Derived Adjectives
Type	Adjective type	Noun/Verb	Eg.	Meaning
Suffix	noun-ā	ରୋଗ	ରୋଗା ଲୋକ	ill person
Suffix	noun-ā	ଦକ୍ଷିଣ	ଦକ୍ଷିଣା ପବନ	southern wind
Suffix	verb-ā	ଶୁଣ	ଶୁଣା କଥା	heard matter
Suffix	verb-ā	ଜାଣ	ଜଣା ଖବର	known news
Suffix	noun verb-ā	ଚାଉଳ, ଧୋ	ଚାଉଳ ଧୁଆ ପାଣି	rice-washed water
Suffix	noun verb-ā	ଲୁଗା, କାଚ୍	ଲୁଗା କଚା ସାବୁନ୍	cloth washing soap
Suffix	verb-i	ଗୁଣ	ଗୁଣି ଲେକ	good person
Suffix	verb-i	ଦାମ୍	ଦାମି ଜିନିଷ	costly thing

== Postpositions ==
Postpositions used with Inflections: The postpositions which occur with nominal forms and function as both morphological and syntactic markers. They are added to the nominal stems formed by noun-genitive case markers.

Postpositions used with Inflections
Postpositions	Meaning	Postpositions	Meaning
ଉପରେ	up	ପରି	like
ମଧ୍ୟରେ	between	ଭଳି	like
ଭିତରେ	in	ପ୍ରତି	per head
ତଳେ	under	ଜଗୁଁ	because of
ପାଖରେ	near	ହେତୁ	because of
ବଦଳରେ	instead of	ନେଇ	by
ନିକଟରେ	near	ଦ୍ଵାରା	by
ଠାରୁ	from	ଦ୍ୱାରା	by
ସକାସେ	for	ପାଇଁ	by
ନିମନ୍ତେ	for	ଠାରେ	at
ପରିବର୍ତ୍ତେ	instead of	ରୁପେ	like

Indeclinable Postpositions: Those which do not have inflected suffixes, function as indeclinables.

Postpositions as Indeclinables
Postpositions	Meaning	Postpositions	Meaning
ଭଳି	like	ପରି	like
ହେଲେ	then	ସବୁ	all
ସହିତ	with	ସଙ୍ଗେ	with
ନିମନ୍ତେ	for	ସାଥେ	with
ମଧ୍ୟ	also	ଅନ୍ତେ	then
ସହ	with	ଜାକ	all

== Classifiers ==
When a noun is enumerated, it takes a group of morphemes called classifiers.

When the number denotes 'one', then the structure of the phrase:

- classifier-numeral noun

Eg- ଜଣେ ପିଲା – one child

When the numeral is more than 'one', then the structure is:

- numeral classifier noun

Eg- ଦୁଇ ଜଣ ପିଲା – two children

Classifiers have two types-

- qualifiers- used for count nouns.

Nouns which occur with ଗୋଟା,ଗୋଟି or its variant -ଟା,-ଟି

Eg- ଗୋଟିଏ ପିଲା – one child, ଦୁଇଟି ପିଲା -two children
ଗୋଟିଏ ଘର – one house, ଦୁଇଟି ଘର – two houses

Other types of count nouns of human and non human forms include-

ଜଣେ ପିଲା – one child
ଖଣ୍ଡେ ଲୁଗା – one piece of cloth
ଗୋଛାଏ କାଠ – one bundle of wood
ଫାଳେ କାଠ – a half piece of wood
ଗଦାଏ କାଠ – one heap of wood
କିଲେ କାଠ – one kilo of wood
ଫୁଟେ କାଠ – one foot of wood
ବସ୍ତାଏ କାଠ – one sack of wood

- quantifiers- used for mass nouns

Nouns which occur with ମେଞ୍ଚା

Eg- ମେଞ୍ଚାଏ କାଦୁଅ – a lump of mud

== Verbs ==
=== Inflection ===
Verbs in Odia are marked for a combination of tense/mood, aspect, person, and number. In the progressive and perfect aspects, aspect is marked on the verb (with the progressive in -u- and the perfect in -i-), while all other information is marked on the auxiliary ach/thā. The overall order is stem + aspect + auxiliary + tense/mood + person/number. For example, khā-u-thā-nt-ā means "he/she would have been eating."

Odia has 5 tenses/moods: the habitual (no suffix), the imperative (no suffix), the past (with the suffix -il-), the conditional (with the suffix -ant-), and the future (with the suffix -ib-). These 5 tenses use the auxiliary th(ā) when in the perfect or progressive aspects. There are also the Present Perfect and the Present Progressive, which use the auxiliary (a)ch. These are then followed by a personal suffix, depending on person, number, as well as the tense:

Personal Suffixes on Odia verbs by tense/mood
Person	Number	Tense/mood				
Person	Number	Habitual	Past/conditional	Future	Imperative	Present Progressive/Perfect
1st	Singular	-e	-i	-i	-ẽ	-i
1st	Plural inclusive	-e	-e	-a	N/A	-e
1st	Plural exclusive	-u	-u	-u	-ũ	-u
2nd	Singular	-u	-u	-u	-Ø	-u
2nd	Plural	-a	-a	-a	-a	-a
3rd	Singular	-e	-ā	-a	-u	-i
3rd	Plural	-anti	-e	-e	-antu	-anti

When preceded by ā, the conditional suffix -ant becomes -ānt- or -nt-. Otherwise, the auxiliary thā becomes th before a vowel.

==== Negation ====
Any finite verb can be negated by adding nāhĩ afterwards. In the Present Progressive and Present Perfect, nāhĩ or the suffix n with personal agreement may replace the auxiliary, as in kar-u-n-i/kar-u-nāhĩ "I am not doing." Other verbs in the Progressive or Perfect aspects may be negated by adding na- before the auxiliary, as in dekh-i-na-thi-li.

=== Causatives ===
The causative in Odia is formed by the suffic ā at the end of a stem. An ā in the root then changes to a.

== See also ==
- Odia language
- Odia script
- Odia literature

== Bibliography ==
- Neukom, Lukas; Patnaik, Manideepa (2003). A grammar of Oriya (PDF). Zürich: Universität Zürich. ISBN 3-9521010-9-5. OCLC 53903369.
- Cardona, George; Jain, Dhanesh, eds. (2003), The Indo-Aryan Languages, Routledge, ISBN 978-0-415-77294-5
- Masica, Colin (1991), The Indo-Aryan Languages, Cambridge: Cambridge University Press, ISBN 978-0-521-29944-2
- John Beames, A comparative grammar of the modern Aryan languages of India: to wit, Hindi, Panjabi, Sindhi, Gujarati, Marathi, Oriya, and Bangali. Londinii: Trübner, 1872–1879. 3 vols.
- Hallam, Ebenezer (1874), Oriya Grammar for English Students, Baptist Mission Press
- Sutton, Amos (1831), An Introductory Grammar of the Oriya Language, Baptist Mission Press, ISBN 9785878188555
- Mahapatra, B.P. (2007), A synchronic grammar of Oriya : standard spoken and written, Central Institute of Indian Languages, Mysore, OCLC 269283851
