= Sundargadi Odia =

Odia dialect of India

- Northwestern Odia
- ସୁନ୍ଦରଗଡ଼ୀ ଓଡ଼ିଆ
- Native to: India
- Region: Odisha (Sundergarh)
- Ethnicity: Odias
- Language family: Indo-European: Indo-Iranian; Indo-Aryan; Eastern; Odia; Sundargadi Odia
- Writing system: Odia

Language codes
- ISO 639-3: –
- Glottolog: nort2659 Northwestern Oriya

Sundargadi Odia (Odia: ସୁନ୍ଦରଗଡ଼ୀ ଓଡ଼ିଆ) or Northwestern Odia is a variety of the Odia language spoken in the Sundergarh district and parts of adjoining districts of Odisha. It is also spoken in the nearby districts of Jashpur of Chhattisgarh and Simdega of Jharkhand.

== Characteristics ==
The Sundargadi variety is influenced by Sambalpuri to the south along with influences from the Sadri and Chhattisgarhi languages due to the geographical location of the Northwestern region of Odisha bordering the adjoining linguistic regions of Jharkhand and Chhattisgarh. The features of the variety are as follows(Sundargadi following Standard Odia):

- Word Final Vowel Deletion (Schwa deletion)

Eg.- In this Genitive case, ଲୋକର (lokara) - ଲୋକର୍ (lokar)

- Some phonetic shifts- 'o' to 'a', 'l' to 'n', medial 'ḍa' to 'ṛa'

Eg.- to me- ମୋତେ (mote) - ମତେ (mate), he had got- ପାଇଲେ (pāile) - ପାଇନେ (pāine), did- କଲି (kali) - କନିଁ (kanĩ), great- ବଡ (ḍa) - ବଡ଼ (baṛa)

- case variations

Dative- 'ki' instead of 'ku', what- କାହିଁକି (kāhĩki)

Locative- 'ra' instead of 're', in answer- ଜବାବର (jabābra), in the forest- ବଣର (baṇara)

Genitive (Pronoun)- your- ତୋର (tora) - ତୋହୋର୍ (tohor)
