= Baleswari Odia =

Odia dialect of India

- Northern Odia
- ବାଲେଶ୍ୱରୀ ଓଡ଼ିଆ
- Kāndaṇā during Odia Hindu Wedding in Baleswari-Odia
- Native to: India
- Region: Odisha (Baleswar, Bhadrak, Mayurbhanj, Kendujhar)
- Ethnicity: Odias
- Language family: Indo-European: Indo-Iranian; Indo-Aryan; Eastern; Odia; Baleswari Odia
- Writing system: Odia

Language codes
- ISO 639-3: –
- Glottolog: nort2660 North Balasore Oriya

Song and storytelling by a Baleswari Odia speaker, recorded in India.

Baleswari Odia (Odia: ବାଲେଶ୍ୱରୀ ଓଡ଼ିଆ), also Northern Odia or North Balasore Odia, is a variety of Odia spoken in the northern regions of Indian state of Odisha. It is spoken in the districts of Balasore, Bhadrak, Mayurbhanj (commonly called Mayurbhanjia) and Kendujhar (commonly called Kendujharia).

It has linguistic variations to standard Odia. While the dialects spoken in these districts vary with regional influences and influences from different local community and tribal language groups, the Baleswari Odia from the northern coastal Balasore region has a distinct accent with some similarity with the nearby Medinipuri dialect of Odia and Bengali. The dialect in Bhadrak district have more similarity with the standard Odia.

== Features ==
Baleswari substitutes କିସ (kisa) for a frequently used word କଣ (kaṇa) meaning 'what' and କେନେ (kene) for କାହିଁକି (kāhĩki) meaning 'why'. Most of the syllables which are pronounced as "o" in Standard Odia are pronounced as "u" in Baleswaria such as ଓଡ଼ିଶା (Odia pronunciation: [oɽiɕaː]) is pronounced as ଉଡ଼ିସା Odia pronunciation: [uɽisaː].

The following is a list of major words in Baleswari:

Grammatical differences
Standard Odia	Baleswari Odia	Meaning	Feature
ହେବି (hebi)	ହେମି (hemi)	shall be	
ହେଲି (heli)	ହେନି (heni)	have been	
ସେଠାକୁ (seṭhāku)	ସେଟିକୁ (seṭiku)	to there	
ମୋର (mora)	ମର (mara)	mine	1p sing Pronoun, oblique, Genitive case
ପରି (pari)	ପିନି (pini)	like	Postposition
ତୋର (tora)	ତର (tara)	your	2p sing Pronoun, oblique, Genitive case
ଦୁହେଁ (duhẽ)	ଦୁୟା (duyā)	both	
ତୃତୀୟ (tr̥tīya)	ତେହଳି (tehaḷi)	third	
କାହିଁକି (kāhĩki)	କେନେ (kene)	Why	Adverb
କେଉଁଠି? (keũṭhi)	କେଠି (keṭhi)	Where?	Adverb
କେଉଁଠାରେ? (keũṭhāre), କେଉଁଠି (keũṭhi)	କେଇଠି (keiṭhi)	Where at/in	Adverb
କଣ (kaṇa)	କିସ (kisa)	What	Adverb
କେତେ (kete)	କାତେ (kāte)	Some	
କୁଆଡ଼େ (kuāṛe) kuāde	କାଡ଼େ (kāṛe) kāde	Where	Adverb
ବାଲେଶ୍ୱରଠାରୁ (baleśwaraṭhāru)	ବାଲେଶ୍ୱରଠୁଁ (baleśwaraṭhũ)	from Baleswar	Locative case

Vowel Harmony — o to u phoneme shift — Nouns. This phonetic feature is also seen in Sambalpuri
Standard Odia	Baleswari Odia	Meaning
ଶୋଷ (śoṣa)	ଶୁଷ (śuṣa)	thirst
ଲୋକ (loka)	ଲୁକ (luka)	person
ଭୋକ (bhoka)	ଭୁକ (bhuka)	hunger
ପୋଲ (pola)	ପୁଲ (pula)	bridge
ଧୋତି (dhoti)	ଧୁତି (dhuti)	dhoti
ଦୋଳା (doḷā)	ଦୁଳା (duḷā)	swing
ଟୋକା (ṭokā)	ଟୁକା (ṭukā)	boy
ଟୋକୀ (ṭokī)	ଟୁକୀ (ṭukī)	girl
ଚୋରି (cori)	ଚୁରି (curi)	theft
ଚୋପା (copā)	ଚୁପା (cupā)	peel
କୋଲପ (kolapa)	କୁଲୁପ (kulupa)	padlock
ଗୋଡ଼ (goṛa) goda	ଗୁଡ଼ (guṛa) guda	leg
ଓଲଟା (olaṭā)	ଉଲଟା (ulaṭā)	upside down
ଓଡ଼ିଶା (oṛiśā)	ଉଡ଼ିଶା (uṛiśā)	Odisha
ଓଡ଼ିଆ (oṛiā)	ଉଡ଼ିଆ (uṛiā)	Odia
ପୋଟଳ (poṭaḷa)	ପୁଟୁଳ (puṭuḷa)	pointed gourd

Vowel Harmony — o to u phoneme shift — Verbs
Standard Odia	Baleswari Odia	Meaning
ଶୋଷିବା (śoṣibā)	ସୁଷିବା (suṣibā)	to suck
ଶୋଇବା (śoibā)	ଶୁଇବା (śuibā)	to sleep
ରୋକିବା (rokibā)	ରୁକିବା (rukibā)	to stop
ଯୋଡ଼ିବା (ẏoṛibā) jodibā	ଯୁଡ଼ିବା (ẏuṛibā) judibā	to attach
ମୋଡ଼ିବା (moṛibā) modibā	ମୁଡ଼ିବା (moṛibā) mudibā	to turn
ପୋଷିବା (poṣibā)	ପୁଷିବା (puṣibā)	bring up
ଢୋକିବା (ḍhokibā)	ଢୁକିବା (ḍhukibā)	to swallow
ଜୋଡ଼ିବା (joṛibā) jodibā	ଜୁଡ଼ିବା (joṛibā) judibā	join
ଓହ୍ଲାଇବା (ohlāibā)	ଉହ୍ଲାଇବା (uhlāibā)	to descend

Baleswari Odia words, verbs and expressions
Standard Odia	Baleswari Odia	Meaning
ଯିବି (jibi)	ଜିମି (jimi)	go
ଲୁଣ (luṇa)	ନୁଣ (nuṇa)	salt
ଲୁଚିବା (lucibā)	ଲୁକିବା (lukibā)	to hide
ଝିଅ (jhia)	ଝିଇ (jhi'i)	daughter
ଫୋଟ୍କା (phuṭakā)	ଫୁଟ୍କା (phuṭkā)	blister
ଆଲୁଅ (ālua)	ଆଲ (āla)	light
ଫୋପାଡ଼ିବା (phopāṛibā) phopādibā	ଫିମ୍ପାଡ଼ିବା (phimpāṛibā) phimpādibā	throw away
ଲୁଚାଇବା (lucāibā)	ନୁଚାଇବା (nucāibā)	to hide
ଖାଇବାକୁ (khāibāku)	ଖାଇତେ (khāite)	going to eat
ଶୋଇବାକୁ (śoibāku)	ସୁଇତେ (suite)	going to sleep
ଲୁଗା (lugā)	ନୁଗା (nugā)	cloth
ଘୁଞ୍ଚାଇବା (ghuñcāibā)	ସର୍କେଇବା (sarkeibā)	to remove
ଘୁଞ୍ଚିବା (ghuñcibā)	ସରିବା (saribā)	to move
ଜାହାଜ (jāhāja)	ବୁଇତ (buita)	ship
ଫେଣା (pheṇā)	ଫେଣେଇ (pheṇei)	foam
ପାଣିଚିଆ (pāṇiciā)	ଫସ୍କା (phaskā)	tasteless
ଲାଗିବା (lāgibā)	ମାଡ଼ିବା (maṛibā) madibā	to appear
ବାଜିବା (bājibbā)	ଭେଟିବା (bheṭibā)	to strike
ପୁସ୍ତକ (pusṭaka)	ପୁଥି (puthi)	book
ତମାଖୁ (tamākhu)	ଦୁକୁତା (dukutā)	tobacco
ସମତଳକରିବା (samataḷakaribā)	ଥଳାଇବା (thaḷāibā)	level up
ପଇଡ଼ (paiḍa)	ଡାବ (ḍāba)	raw coconut
ଚନ୍ଦା (candā)	ଟାକରା (ṭākarā)	bald
ଛାତ୍ରବୃତ୍ତି (chātrabr̥tti)	ଜଳପାନି (jaḷapāni)	stipend
କୁଆପଥର (kuāpathara)	ଘୋଳପଥର (ghoḷapathara)	hailstone
କଙ୍କି (kaṅki)	ଘୂରଘୂରିଆ (ghūrghūriā)	dragonfly
ବିଲମ୍ବ କରିବା (bilamba karibā)	ଗୌଣ କରିବା (gauṇa karibā)	to delay
ଗଉଡ଼ (gauṛa) gauda	ଗୁଆଲା (guālā	milkman
ଶ୍ୱାସରୋଧ (śwāsarodha)	ଗଲାଚାପା (galacapā)	strangulation
ପ୍ରଭାବ (prabhāba)	ଖେଉରି (kheuri)	influence
କୁଞ୍ଚୁକୁଞ୍ଚୁଆହେବା (kuñcukuñcuāhebā)	କୋଙ୍କଡ଼ାଇବା (koṅkaṛaibā) koṅkadaibā	to become curled/crisped
ଓପରଓଳି (oparaoḷi)	ଉତା (utā)	afternoon
ଛୋଟ,ସାନ (choṭa, sāna)	କଟି (kaṭi)	small
କଇଁଛ (kaĩcha)	କଚିମ (kacima)	tortoise
ଫାଟକ (phāṭaka)	ଆଗଡ଼ (āgaṛa) āgada	gate
ଝୁଣ୍ଟି ପଡ଼ିବା (jhuṇṭi paṛibā) jhuṇṭi padibā'	ହୋଚଟ୍ ଖାଇବା (hocaṭ khāibā)	to stumble
ଇଆଡ଼ୁ ସିଆଡ଼ୁ (iāṛu siāṛu) iādu siādu	ହେନ ତେନ (hena tena)	this way or that way
