= Odia language =

Indo-Aryan language

Odia
- Ōṛiā
- ଓଡ଼ିଆ
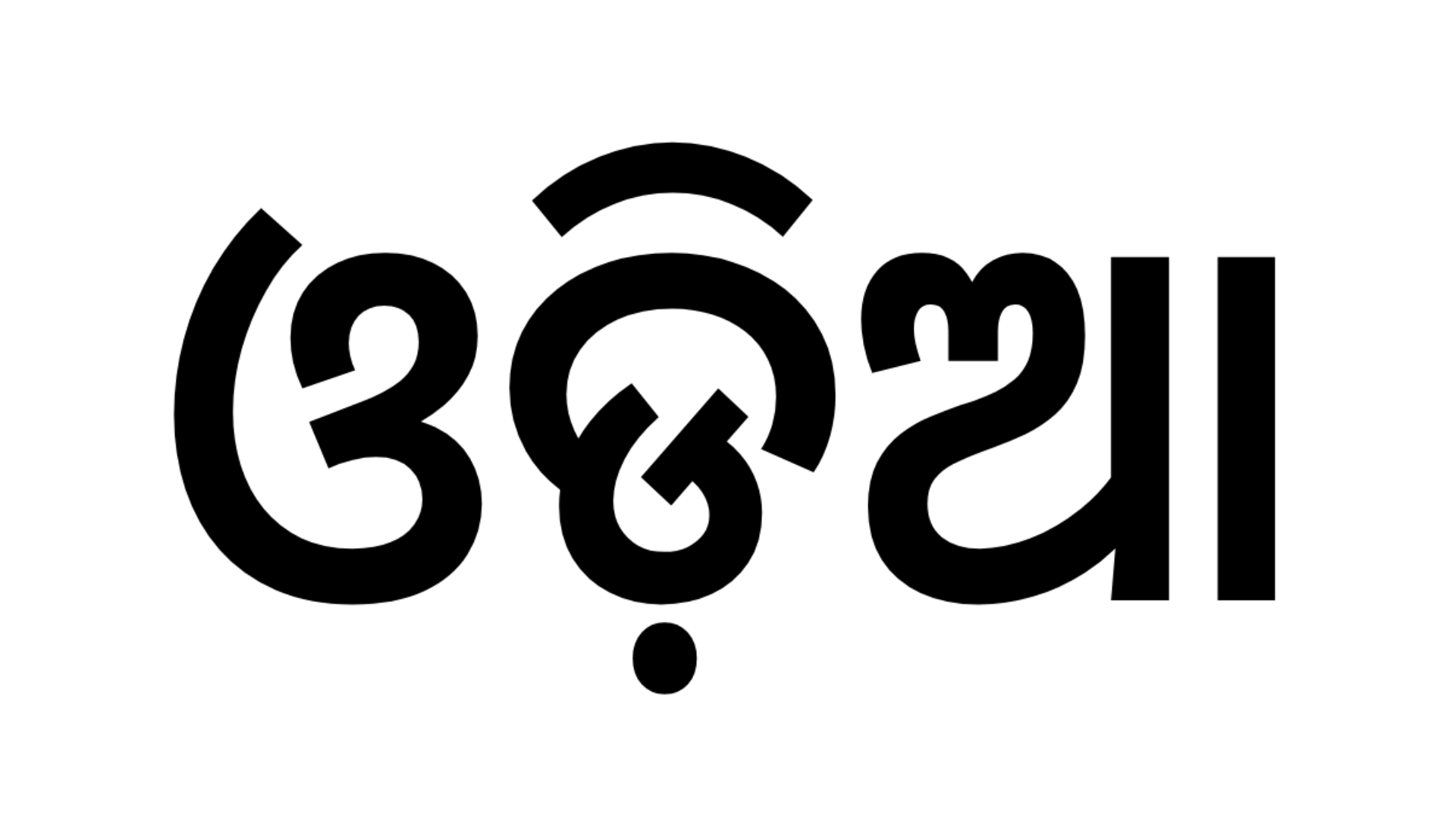
- The word "Oṛiā" in Odia script
- Pronunciation: [oˈɽia] (Odia)
- Native to: India
- Region: Eastern India: Odisha; Parts of Jharkhand, Chhattisgarh, Andhra Pradesh and West Bengal
- Ethnicity: Odias and Tribals of Odisha
- Speakers: L1: 34 million (2011–2019); L2: 3.6 million (2001)
- Language family: Indo-European: Indo-Iranian; Indo-Aryan; Eastern; Odia
- Early forms: Prakrit: Magadhi Prakrit; Odra Prakrit; Old Odia
- Standard forms: Standard Odia
- Dialects: Baleswari Odia (Northern); Kataki Odia (Central); Dhenkanalia (Central); Anugulia (Central); Sambalpuri Odia (Western); Ganjami Odia (Southern); Sundargadi Odia (Northwestern); Desia (South-western); Tribal and Community dialects; Others dialects
- Writing system: Odia script; Kalinga script (historical); Odia Braille

Official status
- Official language in: India; Odisha; Jharkhand (additional); West Bengal (additional)
- Regulated by: Odisha Sahitya Akademi, Government of Odisha

Language codes
- ISO 639-1: or
- ISO 639-2: ori
- ISO 639-3: ori – inclusive code Individual codes: ory – Odia spv – Sambalpuri Odia ort – Adivasi Odia (Kotia) dso – Desia (South-western) (duplicate of [ort])
- Glottolog: macr1269 Macro-Oriya (Odra) oriy1255 Odia
- Odia majority or plurality Significant Odia minority

Odia (ଓଡ଼ିଆ, ISO: Ōṛiā, pronounced [oˈɽia]) or Oriya is a classical Indo-European language of the Indo-Aryan branch spoken in the Indian state of Odisha. It is the official language in Odisha where native speakers make up 82% of the population, and it is also spoken in parts of West Bengal, Jharkhand, Andhra Pradesh and Chhattisgarh. Odia is one of the official languages of India; it is the official language of Odisha and the second official language of Jharkhand. The Odia language has various varieties, including the Baleswari Odia (Northern variety), Kataki, Dhenkanalia, Anugulia (central variety), Ganjami Odia (Southern variety), Sundargadi Odia (Northwestern variety), Sambalpuri Odia (Western variety), Desia Odia (South-western variety) and Tribal Community dialects spoken by the tribal groups in Odisha who adopted the Odia language.

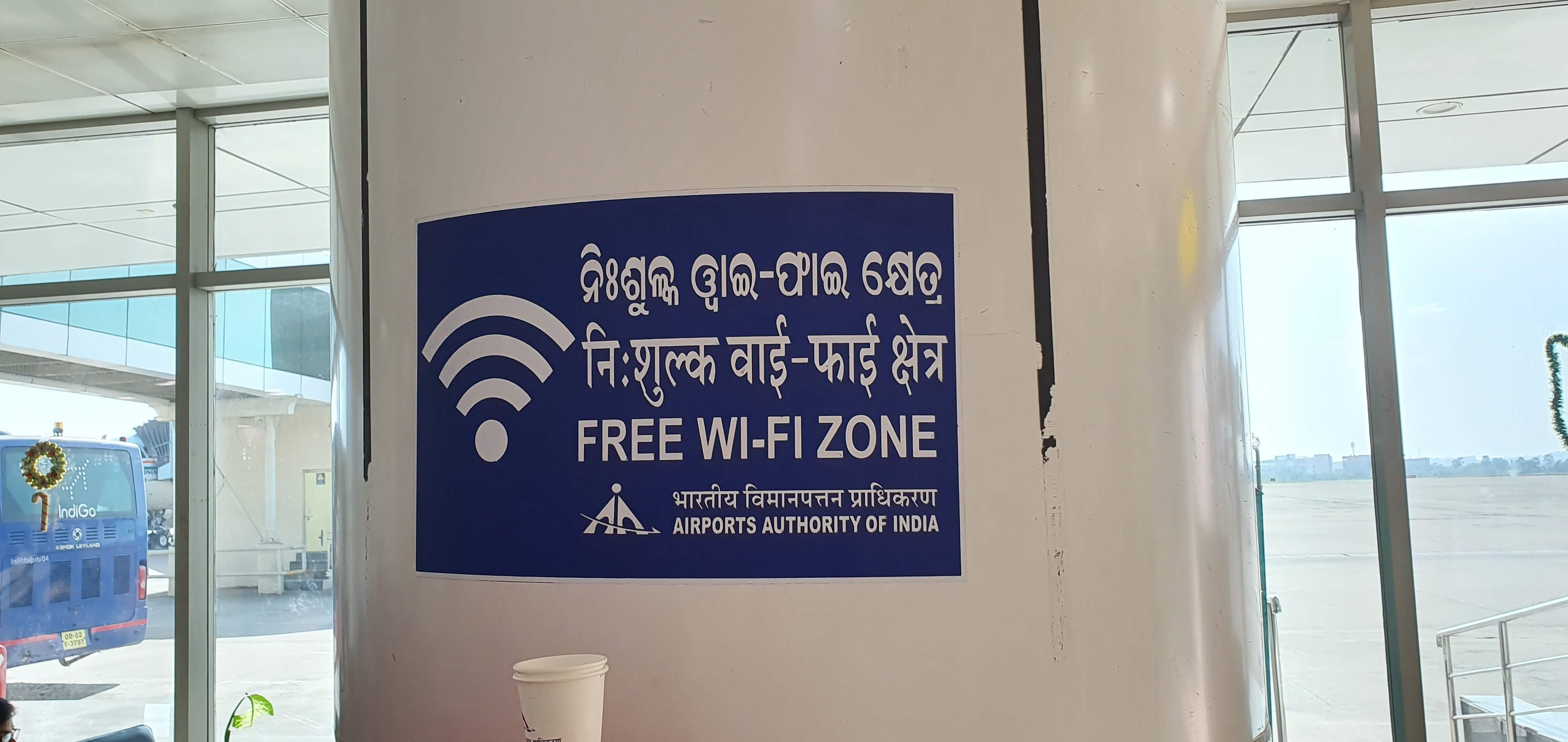
Trilingual signboard at Bhubaneswar Airport having text in Odia, Hindi and English

Odia is the sixth Indian language to be designated a classical language. It traces its linguistic roots to the Eastern Magadhi Prakrit, evolving through stages such as Proto Odia (7th–9th century CE), Old Odia (10th–13th century CE), Middle Odia (14th–17th century CE), and Modern Odia (from the 18th century onward). The language displays a distinct phonological and morphological character shaped by centuries of interaction with tribal and Dravidian tongues. Recognised as a classical language of India, Odia has an unbroken literary tradition, with inscriptions dating back over a thousand years.

== History ==
Odia is an Eastern Indo-Aryan language belonging to the Indo-Aryan language family. It descends from Odra Prakrit which itself evolved from Magadhi Prakrit. The latter was spoken in east India over 1,500 years ago, and is the primary language used in early Jain and Buddhist texts. Odia appears to have had relatively little influence from Persian and Arabic, compared to other major Indo-Aryan languages.

The proto-languages of eastern Magadhan; the split and descent of Proto-Odra (Odra Prakrit), the ancestor of the modern Odia language, from Proto-Magadhan (Magadhi Prakrit)

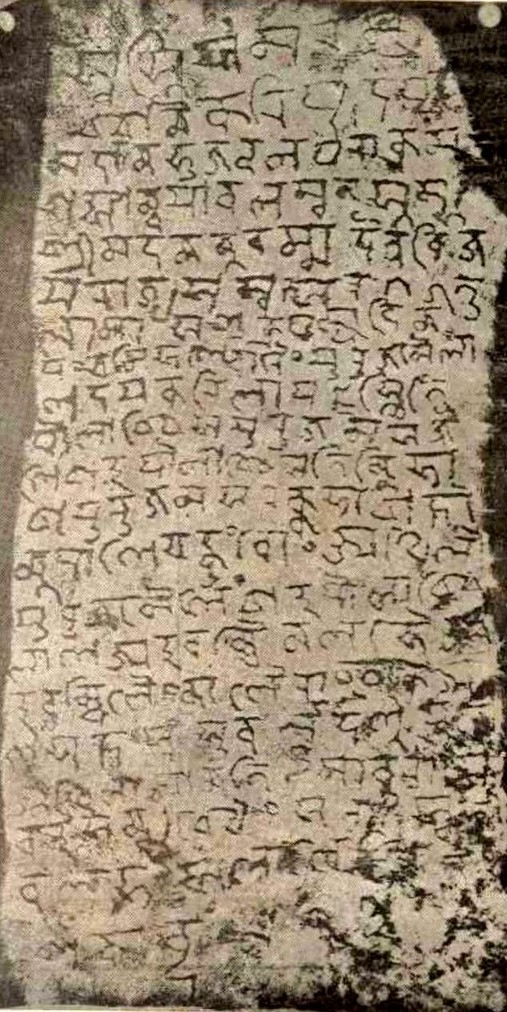
Urajam inscription in Old Odia, royal charter of Eastern Ganga dynasty (1051 CE)

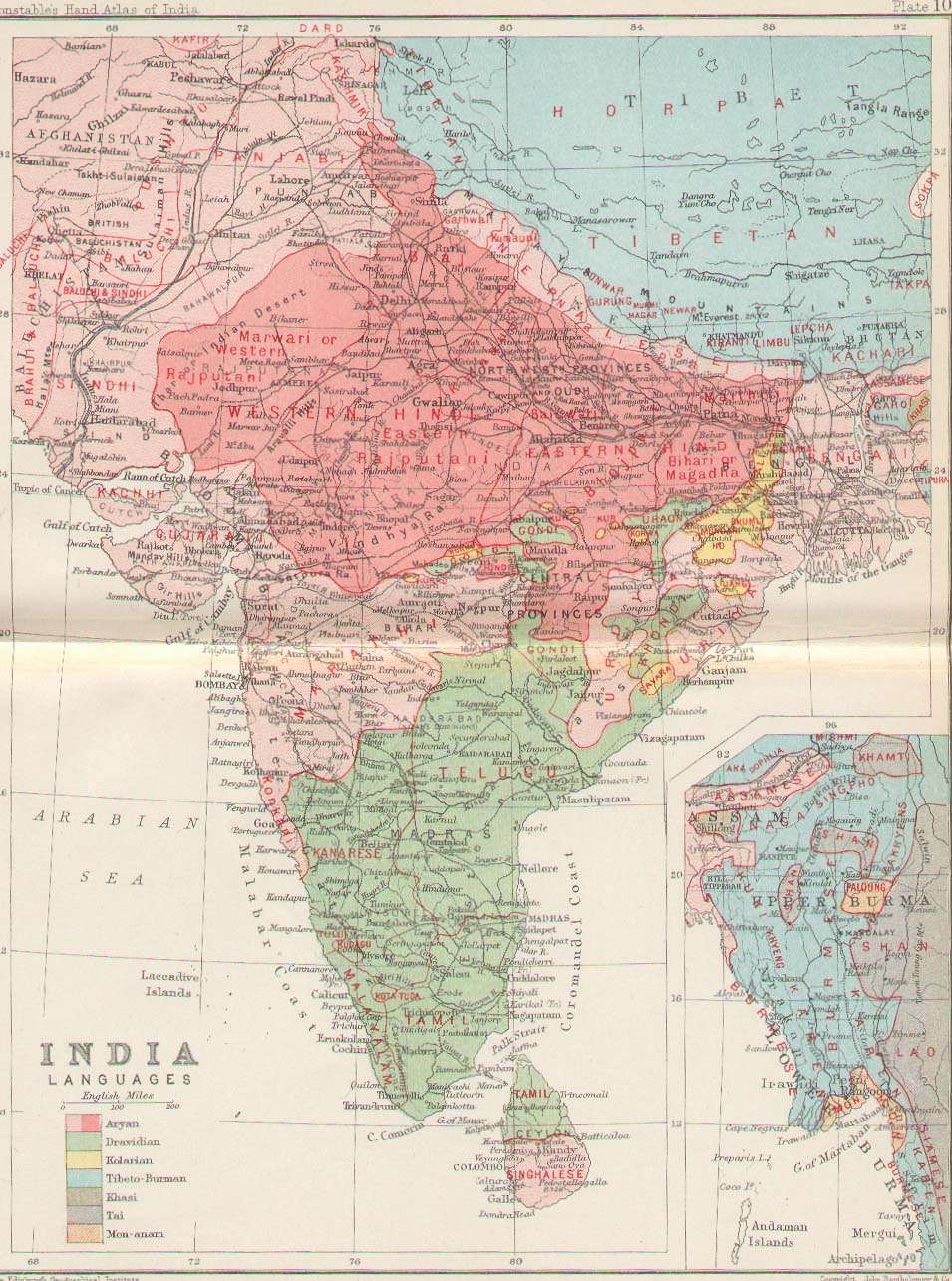
1890s linguistic map of India showing Odia-speaking region

The history of the Odia language is divided into eras:

- Proto-Odia (Odra Prakrit) (10th century and earlier): Inscriptions from 9th century shows the evolution of proto-Odia, i.e. Odra Prakrit or Oriya Prakrit words used along with Sanskrit. The inscriptions are dated to third quarter of 9th century during the reign of early Eastern Gangas.
- Old Odia (10th century till 13th century): Inscriptions from the 10th century onwards provide evidence for the existence of the Old Odia language, with the earliest inscription being the Urajam inscription of the Eastern Gangas written in Old Odia in 1051 CE. Old Odia written in the form of connected lines is found in inscription dated to 1249 CE.
- Early Middle Odia (13th century–15th century): The earliest use of prose can be found in the Madala Panji of the Jagannath Temple at Puri, which dates back to the 12th century. Such works as Sisu Beda, Amarakosa, Gorekha Samhita, Kalasa Chautisa and Saptanga are written in this form of Odia.
- Middle Odia (15th century–17th century): Sarala Das writes the Mahabharata and Bilanka Ramayana. Towards the 15th century, Panchasakha 'five seer poets' namely Balarama Dasa, Jagannatha Dasa, Achyutananda Dasa, Sisu Ananta Dasa and Jasobanta Dasa wrote a number of popular works, including the Odia Bhagabata, Jagamohana Ramayana, Lakshmi Purana, Haribansa, Gobinda Chandra and more. Balarama Dasa, Ananta Dasa and Achyutananda Dasa of Pancha Sakha group hailed from Karana community.
- Late Middle Odia (17th century–Early 19th century): Usabhilasa of Sisu Sankara Dasa, the Rahasya Manjari of Deba Durlabha Dasa and the Rukmini Bibaha of Kartika Dasa were written. Upendra Bhanja took a leading role in this period with his creations Baidehisa Bilasa, Koti Brahmanda Sundari, Labanyabati which emerged as landmarks in Odia Literature. Dinakrushna Dasa's Rasakallola and Abhimanyu Samanta Singhara's Bidagdha Chintamani were prominent latter kabyas. Of the song poets who spearheaded Odissi music, classical music of the state – Upendra Bhanja, Banamali, Kabisurjya Baladeba Ratha, Gopalakrusna were prominent. Bhima Bhoi emerged towards the end of the 19th century.
- Modern Odia (Late 19th century to present): The first Odia magazine, Bodha Dayini was published in Balasore in 1861. During this time many Bengali scholars claimed that Odia was just a dialect of Bengali to exercise of power by cornering government jobs. For instance Pandit Kanti Chandra Bhattacharya, a teacher of Balasore Zilla School, published a little pamphlet named "Odia Ekti Swatantray Bhasha Noi" (Odia not an independent language) where Bhattacharya claimed that Odia was not a separate and original form of language and was a mere corruption of Bengali. He suggested British Government to abolish all Odia Vernacular Schools from Odisha and to alter into Bengali Vernacular Schools. The first Odia newspaper Utkala Deepika, launched in 1866 under editors Gourishankar Ray and Bichitrananda. In 1869 Bhagavati Charan Das started another newspaper, Utkal Subhakari. More Odia newspapers soon followed like Utkal Patra, Utkal Hiteisini from Cuttack, Utkal Darpan and Sambada Vahika from Balasore and Sambalpur Hiteisini from Deogarh. Fakir Mohan Senapati emerged as a prominent Odia fiction writer of this time and Radhanath Ray as a prominent Odia poet. Other prominent Odia writers who helped promote Odia at this time were Madhusudan Das, Madhusudan Rao, Gangadhar Meher, Chintamani Mohanty, Nanda Kishore Bal, Reba Ray, Gopabandhu Das and Nilakantha Das.

== Geographical distribution ==
=== India ===
Distribution of Odia language in the state of India
1. Odisha (92.5%)
2. Chhattisgarh (2.40%)
3. Jharkhand (1.40%)
4. Andhra Pradesh (1.00%)
5. Assam (0.60%)
6. Gujarat (0.50%)
7. West Bengal (0.40%)
8. Maharashtra (0.40%)
9. Other states (0.80%)

According to the 2011 census, there are 37.52 million Odia speakers in India, making up 3.1% of the country's population. Among these, 93% reside in Odisha. Odia is also spoken in neighbouring states such as Chhattisgarh (913,581), Jharkhand (531,077), Andhra Pradesh (361,471), and West Bengal (162,142), as of 2011 Census.

Due to migration as tea garden workers in colonial British India, northeastern states Assam and Tripura have a sizeable Odia-speaking population, particularly in Sonitpur, Tinsukia, Udalguri, Sivasagar, Golaghat, Dibrugarh, Cachar, Nagaon, Karimganj, Karbi Anglong, Jorhat, Lakhimpur, Baksa, Kamrup Metropolitan, Hailakandi district of Assam and West Tripura, Dhalai, North Tripura district of Tripura. Similarly, due to economic migration in modern India, the western states Gujarat and Maharashtra also have a significant Odia speaking population. Additionally, due to economic pursuits, significant numbers of Odia speakers can be found in Indian cities such as Vishakhapatnam, Hyderabad, Pondicherry, Kolkata, Bangalore, Chennai, Goa, Mumbai, Raipur, Jamshedpur, Vadodara, Ahmedabad, New Delhi, Guwahati, Shillong, Pune, Gurgaon, Jammu and Silvassa.

=== Foreign countries ===
The Odia diaspora is sizeable in several countries around the world, bringing the number of Odia speakers worldwide to 50 million. It has a significant presence in eastern countries, such as Thailand and Indonesia, mainly brought by the sadhaba, ancient traders from Odisha who carried the language along with the culture during the old-day trading, and in western countries such as the United States, Canada, Australia and England. The language has also spread to Burma, Malaysia, Fiji, Mauritius, Bangladesh, Sri Lanka and Middle East countries.

=== Odia place names ===
Odia place names are present across Odisha, Northern Andhra, South Bengal, South Jharkhand and Chhattisgarh.

Odia street names usually end with -sahi, -pada, -nagar, -vihar/bihar. Examples include Nua-sahi, Madanmohan-pada, Nehru-nagar, Vani-vihar.

Common Odia place names ending with

-pur – Sambalpur, Berhampur, Salepur, Padampur, Bijepur, Jajpur etc.

-eswar – Maneswar, Baleswar, Bhubaneswar etc.

-put – Pokhariput, Bhejiput, Koraput, Lamataput etc.

-giri – Lalitgiri, G. Udayagiri, Ratnagiri etc.

-khol – Chandikhol, Redhakhol, Khaprakhol etc.

-garh/gada – Bargarh, Sarangarh, Nayagarh, Rayagada, Lanjigarh, Titlagarh, Potagada etc.

-pali- Saraipali, Dunguripali, Barpali etc

-palli – Kamapalli, Jamapalli, Barapalli, kanteipalli, Lanjipalli etc

-pada – Amalapada, Kendrapada, Bhatpada, Baripada etc.

-padar – Ballipadar, Bahadapadar, Jahadapadar etc.

-guda – Khariaguda, Kosamaguda, Semiliguda, Muniguda, Jharsuguda etc.

-patna – Bhawanipatna, Manikapatna, Madhupatna, Mugupatna etc.

-munda – Bangomunda, Bondamunda, Baramunda, Kuarmunda etc.

-kela – Rourkela, Seraikela etc.

-bira – Kolabira, Attabira etc.

-prasad – Durgaprasad, Jagannathprasad, Kalikaprasad etc.

-pani – Kanjipani, Bansapani, Taptapani etc.

-jang – Derjang, Parjang, Kujang etc.

-pentha – Chikitipentha, Mahadeipentha etc.

-bandha – Tumudibandha, Garabandha etc.

-khemundi – Paralakhemundi, Badakhemundi, Sanakhemundi etc.

-bali – Tikabali, Chandbali etc.

-kote – Khallikote, Umerkote, Mardakote, Purunakote etc.

-mal – Paikamal, Kandhamal, Reamal etc

-singha – Jarasingha, Loisingha etc

-handi – Papadahandi, Chandahandi, Kalahandi etc.

== Standardisation and Varieties ==
=== Major varieties ===
- Baleswari (Northern Odia): Spoken in Baleswar, Bhadrak, Mayurbhanj and Kendujhar districts of Odisha. The variant spoken in Baleswar is called Baleswaria.
- Kataki (Central Odia): Spoken in the coastal and central regions consisting of Cuttack, Khordha, Puri, Nayagarh, Jajpur, Jagatsinghpur, Kendrapara, Dhenkanal, Angul and Eastern part of Boudh districts of Odisha with regional variations. The Cuttack variant is known as Katakia.
  - Khurda Odia : Spoken in Khordha, Puri and Nayagarh districts of Odisha.
- Ganjami (Southern Odia): Spoken in Ganjam, Gajapati and parts of Kandhamal districts of Odisha, Srikakulam district of Andhra Pradesh. The variant spoken in Berhampur is also known as "Berhampuria".
- Sundargadi (Northwestern Odia): Spoken in Sundergarh and parts of adjoining districts of Odisha and the districts of Jashpur of Chhattisgarh and Simdega of Jharkhand.
- Sambalpuri (Western Odia): It is the western variety of Odia language with the core variant spoken in Sambalpur, Jharsuguda, Bargarh, Balangir and Subarnapur districts, along with parts of Nuapada and western parts of Boudh districts of Odisha. Also spoken in parts of Raigarh, Mahasamund and Raipur districts of Chhattisgarh. A 2006 survey of the varieties spoken in four villages in Western Odisha found out that Sambalpuri share three-quarters of their basic vocabulary with Standard Odia and has 75%–76% lexical similarity with Standard Odia.
- Desia (Southwestern Odia/Koraputi): Spoken in southwestern districts of Nabarangpur, Rayagada, Koraput, Malkangiri and southern parts of Kalahandi districts of Odisha and in the hilly regions of Vishakhapatnam and, Vizianagaram districts of Andhra Pradesh. A variant spoken in Koraput is also known as Koraputia.

Minor regional varieties

- Singhbhumi Odia: Spoken in parts of East Singhbhum, West Singhbhum and Saraikela-Kharsawan district of Jharkhand.
- Phulbani Odia: spoken in Kandhamal and in parts of Boudh district.
- Kalahandia Odia: Variant of Odia spoken in Kalahandi and Nuapada districts and neighbouring districts of Chhattisgarh.
- Debagadia Odia: It is a variant of Odia spoken in Debagarh District, Redhakhol sub-division of Sambalpur District, Athmallik sub-division of Angul District and Bonai sub-division of Sundargarh District area.

=== Major tribal and community dialects/sociolects ===
- Bodo Parja (Jharia): spoken by the Parang Proja tribe of Koraput and neighbouring districts of Odisha.
- Bhatri: language variety spoken by the Bhottada tribe in Odisha and Chhattisgarh.
- Reli: language variety spoken by the Reli people in the Koraput and Rayagada districts of southern Odisha and bordering districts of Andhra Pradesh.
- Kupia: language variety spoken by Valmiki people of Odisha and Andhra Pradesh, mostly in Koraput, and Visakhapatnam districts.

Minor sociolects

Odia minor varieties include:

- Bhuyan: Tribal variety spoken in Northern Odisha.
- Sounti: Spoken in Northern Odisha.
- Bathudi: Spoken in Northern Odisha.
- Kondhan: Tribal variety spoken in Western Odisha.
- Agharia: Spoken by Agharia community in districts of Western Odisha and Chhattisgarh.
- Bhulia: Spoken by Bhulia community in districts of Western Odisha and Chhattisgarh.
- Matia: Tribal variety spoken in Southern Odisha.

== Phonology ==
Pronunciation of Odia alphabet

Odia has 30 consonant phonemes, 2 semivowel phonemes and 6 vowel phonemes.

Odia vowel phonemes
	Front	Central	Back
High	i		u
Mid	e		o
Low		a	ɔ

Length is not contrastive. The vowel [ɛ] can also be heard as an allophone of /e/, or as an allophone of the coalescence of the sequences /j + a/ or /j + ɔ/. Final vowels are pronounced in the standard language, e.g. Odia [pʰulɔ] contrasts Bengali [pʰul] "flower".

Odia consonant phonemes
		Labial	Alveolar/ Dental	Retroflex	Palatal (-alveolar)	Velar/ Glottal
Nasal		m	n	ɳ		(ŋ)
Stop/ Affricate	voiceless	p	t	ʈ	tʃ	k
Stop/ Affricate	aspirated	pʰ	tʰ	ʈʰ	tʃʰ	kʰ
Stop/ Affricate	voiced	b	d	ɖ	dʒ	ɡ
Stop/ Affricate	breathy	bʱ	dʱ	ɖʱ	dʒʱ	ɡʱ
Fricative			s	(ʂ)	(ʃ~ɕ)	ɦ
Approximant		(w)	l	ɭ	j	
Vibrant			r~ɾ	(ɽ, ɽʱ)		

Odia retains the voiced retroflex lateral approximant [ɭ], among the Eastern Indo-Aryan languages. The velar nasal [ŋ] is given phonemic status in some analyses, as it also occurs as a terminal sound, e.g. ଏବଂ, ēbaṅ /ebɔŋ/. Nasals assimilate for place in nasal–stop clusters. /ɖ ɖʱ/ have the near-allophonic intervocalic flaps [ɽ ɽʱ] in intervocalic position and in final position (but not at morpheme boundaries). Stops are sometimes deaspirated after /s/ or an open syllable /s/+vowel and before another vowel. /ʃ/, /ɕ/ and especially /ʂ/ are preserved in some consonant clusters (eg. କଷ୍ଟ, kaṣṭa /kɔʂʈɔ/). Some speakers distinguish between single and geminate consonants.

== Grammar ==
Odia retains most of the cases of Sanskrit, though the nominative and vocative have merged (both without a separate marker), as have the accusative and dative. There are two grammatical numbers (singular and plural). There is no grammatical gender, and usage of gender is semantic (a bit like in English), i.e. to differentiate male members of a class from female members, that too only in nouns. There are three tenses coded via affixes (i.e., present, past and future), others being expressed via auxiliaries.

== Writing system ==
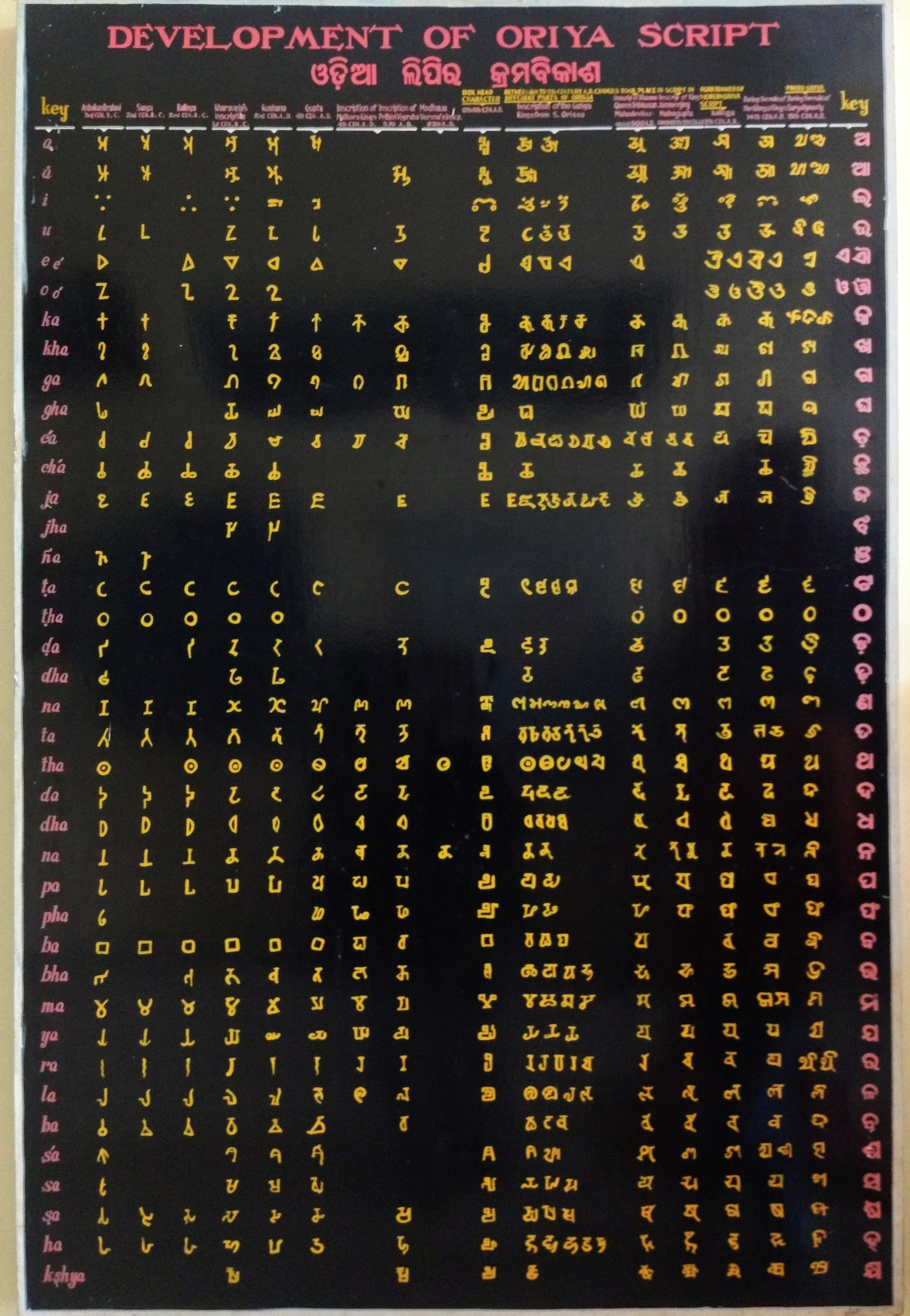
A detailed chart depicting evolution of the Odia script as displayed in a museum at Ratnagiri, Odisha

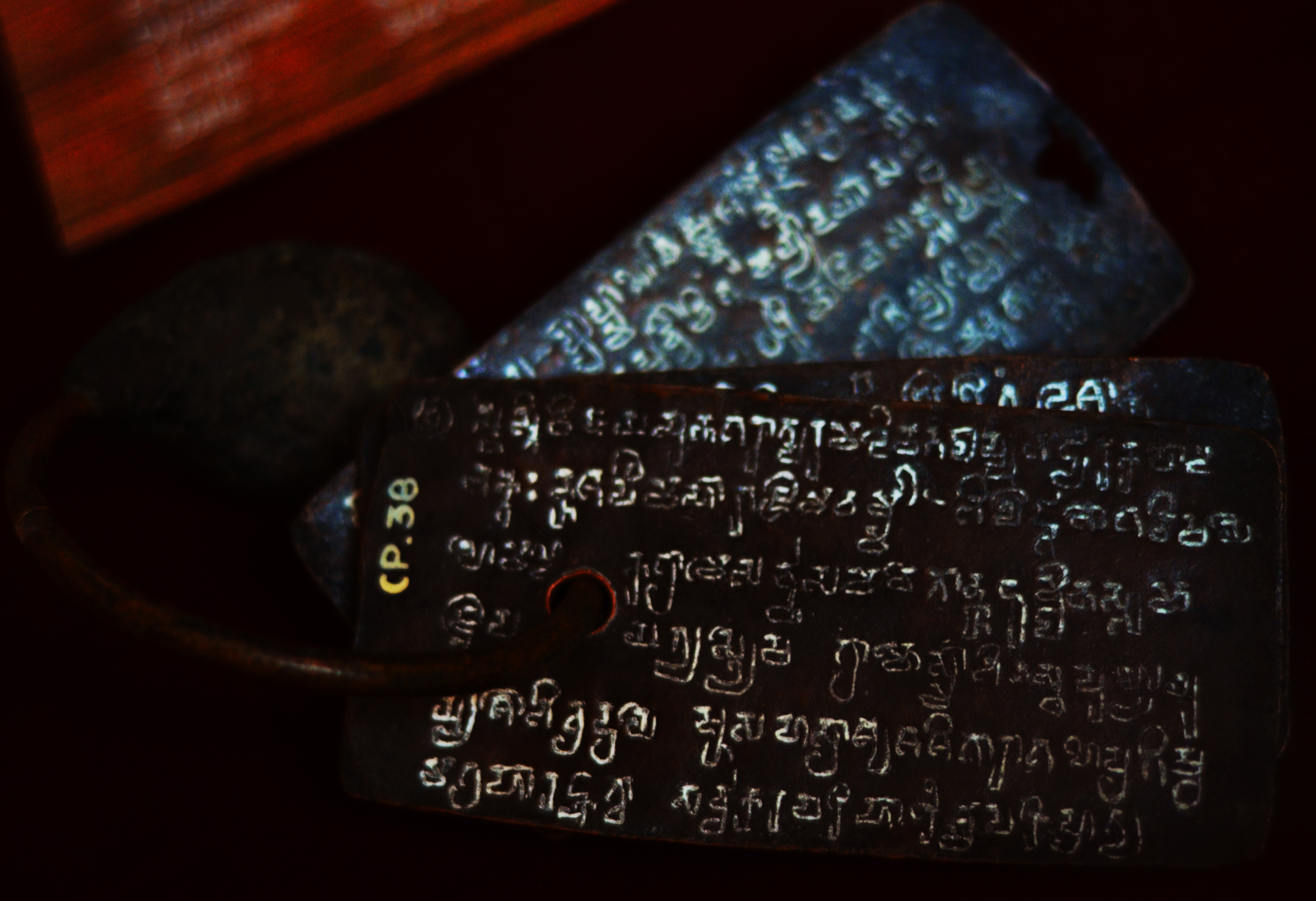
3AD Baranga grant of Umarabana written in Kalinga script

The Odia language uses the Odia script (also known as the Kalinga script). It is a Brahmic script used to write primarily the Odia language and others like Sanskrit and several minor regional languages. The script has developed over nearly 1000 years, with the earliest trace of the script being dated to 1051 AD.

Odia is a syllabic alphabet, or an abugida, wherein all consonants have an inherent vowel. Diacritics (which can appear above, below, before, or after the consonant they belong to) are used to change the form of the inherent vowel. When vowels appear at the beginning of a syllable, they are written as independent letters. Also, when certain consonants occur together, special conjunct symbols are used to combine the essential parts of each consonant symbol.

The curved appearance of the Odia script is a result of the practice of writing on palm leaves, which have a tendency to tear if too many straight lines are used.

Karani Script or Karani Lipi (Odia: କରଣୀ ଲିପି) is a traditional script used primarily in Odisha, India, for administrative and literary purposes during the medieval and early modern periods. Named after the Karana scribes (the traditional writer caste of Odisha), the script was predominantly used in the royal courts and temples, especially for writing on palm leaf manuscripts. It is a cursive form derived from the Odia script, developed to enable faster writing with a stylus or pen. The Karani script is characterised by its flowing, connected style, making it distinct from the formal printed Odia script. Though no longer in widespread use, it remains an important part of Odisha's manuscript heritage and is preserved in temple records, historical documents, and museum collections.

=== Odia script ===
Vowels ସ୍ୱର ବର୍ଣ୍ଣ
ଅ	ଆ	ଇ	ଈ	ଉ	ଊ	ଋ	ୠ	ଌ	ୡ	ଏ	ଐ	ଓ	ଔ

Consonants ବ୍ୟଞ୍ଜନ ବର୍ଣ୍ଣ
କ	ଖ	ଗ	ଘ	ଙ
ଚ	ଛ	ଜ	ଝ	ଞ
ଟ	ଠ	ଡ	ଢ	ଣ
ତ	ଥ	ଦ	ଧ	ନ
ପ	ଫ	ବ	ଭ	ମ
ଯ	ର	ଳ	ୱ	
ଶ	ଷ	ସ	ହ	
ୟ	ଲ	ଡ଼	ଢ଼	କ୍ଷ

Diacritics
ା	ି	ୀ	ୁ	ୂ	ୃ	ୄ	ୢ	ୣ	େ	ୈ	ୋ	ୌ

Signs, Punctuation
ଂ	ଃ	ଁ	୍	଼	।	॥	ଽ	ଓଁ	୰

Numbers ସଂଖ୍ୟା
୦	୧	୨	୩	୪	୫	୬	୭	୮	୯

== Literature ==
Sarahapada was one of the 84 Siddhas who has composed Dohas in (couplets) are compiled in Dohakośa, the 'Treasury of Rhyming Couplets'. Padas (verses) 22, 32, 38 and 39 of Caryagītikośa (or Charyapada) are assigned to him. The script used in the dohas shows close resemblance with the Odia script.

The earliest literature in Odia can be traced to the Charyapadas, composed in the 7th to 9th centuries. Before Sarala Das, the most important works in Odia literature are the Shishu Veda, Saptanga, Amara Kosha, Rudrasudhanidhi, Kesaba Koili, Kalasa Chautisa, etc. In the 14th century, the poet Sarala Das wrote the Sarala Mahabharata, Chandi Purana, and Vilanka Ramayana, in praise of the goddess Durga. Rama-Bibaha, written by Arjuna Dasa, was the first long poem written in the Odia language.

The following era is termed the Panchasakha Age and stretches until the year 1700. Notable religious works of the Panchasakha Age include those of Balarama Dasa, Jagannatha Dasa, Yasovanta, Ananta and Acyutananda. The authors of this period mainly translated, adapted, or imitated Sanskrit literature. Other prominent works of the period include the Usabhilasa of Sisu Sankara Dasa, the Rahasya Manjari of Debadurlabha Dasa and the Rukmini Bibha of Kartika Dasa. A new form of novels in verse evolved during the beginning of the 17th century when Ramachandra Pattanayaka wrote Harabali. Other poets, like Madhusudana, Bhima Dhibara, Sadasiba and Sisu Iswara Dasa composed another form called kavyas (long poems) based on themes from Puranas, with an emphasis on plain, simple language.

However, during the Bhanja Age (also known as the Age of Riti Yuga) beginning with turn of the 18th century, verbally tricky Odia became the order of the day. Verbal jugglery and eroticism characterise the period between 1700 and 1850, particularly in the works of the era's eponymous poet Upendra Bhanja (1670–1720). Bhanja's work inspired many imitators, of which the most notable is Arakshita Das. Family chronicles in prose relating religious festivals and rituals are also characteristic of the period.

The first Odia printing typeset was cast in 1836 by Christian missionaries. Although the handwritten Odia script of the time closely resembled the Bengali and Assamese scripts, the one adopted for the printed typesets was significantly different. Amos Sutton produced an Oriya Bible (1840), Oriya Dictionary (1841–1843) and An Introductory Grammar of Oriya (1844).

Odia has a rich literary heritage dating back to the thirteenth century. Sarala Dasa who lived in the fourteenth century is known as the Vyasa of Odisha. He wrote the Mahabharata into Odia. In fact, the language was initially standardised through a process of translating or transcreating classical Sanskrit texts such as the Mahabharata, Ramayana and the Bhagavad Gita. The translation of the Bhagavatam by Atibadi Jagannatha Dasa was particularly influential on the written form of the language. Another of the Panchasakha, Matta Balarama Dasa transcreated the Ramayana in Odia, titled Jagamohana Ramayana. Odia has had a strong tradition of poetry, especially devotional poetry.

Other eminent Odia poets include Kabi Samrat Upendra Bhanja, Kabisurjya Baladeba Ratha, Banamali Dasa, Dinakrusna Dasa and Gopalakrusna Pattanayaka. Classical Odia literature is inextricably tied to music, and most of it was written for singing, set to traditional Odissi ragas and talas. These compositions form the core of the system of Odissi music, the classical music of the state.

Three great poets and prose writers, Kabibar Radhanath Ray (1849–1908), Fakir Mohan Senapati (1843–1918) and Madhusudan Rao (1853–1912) made Odia their own. They brought in a modern outlook and spirit into Odia literature. Around the same time the modern drama took birth in the works of Rama Sankara Ray beginning with Kanci-Kaveri (1880).

Among the contemporaries of Fakir Mohan, four novelists deserve special mention: Aparna Panda, Mrutyunjay Rath, Ram Chandra Acharya and Brajabandhu Mishra. Aparna Panda's Kalavati and Brajabandhu Mishra's Basanta Malati were both published in 1902, the year in which Chha Mana Atha Guntha came out in the book form.

One of the great writers in the 20th century was Pandit Krushna Chandra Kar (1907–1995) from Cuttack, who wrote many books for children like Pari Raija, Kuhuka Raija, Panchatantra, Adi Jugara Galpa Mala, etc. He was last felicitated by the Sahitya Academy in 1971–72 for his contributions to Odia literature, development of children's fiction, and biographies.

One of the prominent writers of the 20th and 21st centuries was Muralidhar Mallick (1927–2002). His contribution to historical novels is beyond words. He was last felicitated by the Sahitya Academy in the year 1998 for his contributions to Odia literature. His son Khagendranath Mallick (born 1951) is also a writer. His contribution towards poetry, criticism, essays, short stories, and novels is commendable. He was the former President of Utkal Kala Parishad and also former President of Odisha Geeti Kabi Samaj. Presently he is a member of the Executive Committee of Utkal Sahitya Samaj. Another illustrious writer of the 20th century was Chintamani Das. A noted academician, he was written more than 40 books including fiction, short stories, biographies and storybooks for children. Born in 1903 in Sriramachandrapur village under Satyabadi block, Chintamani Das is the only writer who has written biographies on all the five 'Pancha Sakhas' of Satyabadi namely Pandit Gopabandhu Das, Acharya Harihara, Nilakantha Das, Krupasindhu Mishra and Pandit Godabarisha. Having served as the Head of the Odia department of Khallikote College, Berhampur, Chintamani Das was felicitated with the Sahitya Akademi Samman in 1970 for his outstanding contribution to Odia literature in general and Satyabadi Yuga literature in particular. Some of his well-known literary creations are 'Bhala Manisha Hua', 'Manishi Nilakantha', 'Kabi Godabarisha', 'Byasakabi Fakiramohan', 'Usha', 'Barabati'.

20th century writers in Odia include Pallikabi Nanda Kishore Bal, Gangadhar Meher, Chintamani Mahanti and Kuntala Kumari Sabat, besides Niladri Dasa and Gopabandhu Das. The most notable novelists were Umesa Sarakara, Divyasimha Panigrahi, Gopala Chandra Praharaj and Kalindi Charan Panigrahi. Sachi Kanta Rauta Ray is the great introducer of the ultra-modern style in modern Odia poetry. Others who took up this form were Godabarisha Mohapatra, Mayadhar Mansingh, Nityananda Mahapatra and Kunjabihari Dasa. Prabhasa Chandra Satpathi is known for his translations of some western classics apart from Udayanatha Shadangi, Sunanda Kara and Surendranatha Dwivedi. Criticism, essays and history also became major lines of writing in the Odia language. Esteemed writers in this field were Professor Girija Shankar Ray, Pandit Vinayaka Misra, Professor Gauri Kumara Brahma, Jagabandhu Simha and Harekrushna Mahatab. Odia literature mirrors the industrious, peaceful and artistic image of the Odia people who have offered and gifted much to the Indian civilisation in the field of art and literature. Now Writers Manoj Das's creations motivated and inspired people towards a positive lifestyle. Distinguished prose writers of the modern period include Baidyanath Misra, Fakir Mohan Senapati, Madhusudan Das, Godabarisha Mohapatra, Kalindi Charan Panigrahi, Surendra Mohanty, Manoj Das, Kishori Charan Das, Gopinath Mohanty, Rabi Patnaik, Chandrasekhar Rath, Binapani Mohanty, Bhikari Rath, Jagadish Mohanty, Sarojini Sahoo, Yashodhara Mishra, Ramchandra Behera, Padmaja Pal. But it is poetry that makes modern Odia literature a force to reckon with. Poets like Kabibar Radhanath Ray, Sachidananda Routray, Guruprasad Mohanty, Soubhagya Misra, Ramakanta Rath, Sitakanta Mohapatra, Rajendra Kishore Panda, Pratibha Satpathy have made significant contributions towards Indian poetry.

Anita Desai's novella, Translator Translated, from her collection The Art of Disappearance, features a translator of a fictive Odia short story writer. The novella contains a discussion of the perils of translating works composed in regional Indian languages into English.

Four writers in Odia – Gopinath Mohanty, Sachidananda Routray, Sitakant Mahapatra and Pratibha Ray – have been awarded the Jnanpith, an Indian literary award.

== Sample text ==
The following is a sample text in Odia of Article 1 of the Universal Declaration of Human Rights (ମାନବିକ ଅଧିକାରର ସାର୍ବଜନୀନ ଘୋଷଣା):

Odia in the Odia script

ଅନୁଚ୍ଛେଦ ୧: ସମସ୍ତ ମନୁଷ୍ୟ ଜନ୍ମକାଳରୁ ସ୍ୱାଧୀନ ଏବଂ ମର୍ଯ୍ୟାଦା ଓ ଅଧିକାରରେ ସମାନ । ସେମାନଙ୍କଠାରେ ବୁଦ୍ଧି ଓ ବିବେକ ନିହିତ ଅଛି ଏବଂ ସେମାନଙ୍କୁ ପରସ୍ପର ପ୍ରତି ଭ୍ରାତୃତ୍ୱ ମନୋଭାବରେ ବ୍ୟବହାର କରିବା ଉଚିତ୍ ।

Odia in IAST

Anuccheda eka: Samasta manuṣya janmakāḻaru swādhīna ebaṁ marẏyādā o adhikārare samāna. Semānaṅkaṭhāre buddhi o bibeka nihita achi ebaṁ semānaṅku paraspara prati bhrātṛtwa manobhābare byabahāra karibā ucit.

Odia in the IPA

ɔnut͡ːʃʰed̪ɔ ekɔ: sɔmɔst̪ɔ mɔnuʂjɔ d͡ʒɔnmɔkaɭɔɾu swad̪ʱinɔ ebɔŋ mɔɾd͡ʒjad̪a o ɔd̪ʱikaɾɔɾe sɔmanɔ. semanɔŋkɔʈʰaɾe bud̪ːʱi o bibekɔ niɦit̪ɔ ɔt͡ʃʰi ebɔŋ semanɔŋku pɔɾɔspɔɾɔ pɾɔt̪i bʱɾat̪ɾut̪wɔ mɔnobʱabɔɾe bjɔbɔɦaɾɔ kɔɾiba ut͡ʃit̪

Gloss

Article 1: All human beings from birth are free and dignity and rights are equal. Their reason and intelligence endowed with and they towards one another in a brotherhood spirit behaviour to do should.

Translation

Article 1: All human beings are born free and equal in dignity and rights. They are endowed with reason and conscience and should act towards one another in a spirit of brotherhood.

== Software ==
Google introduced the first automated translator for Odia in 2020. Microsoft too incorporated Odia in its automated translator later that year.
